= Ode to a Tree =

- Artist: Le Roy (L. R.) Setziol
- Year: 1977
- Type: Sculpture
- Medium: Alaskan yellow cedar
- Condition: "Treatment needed" (1993)
- Location: Corvallis, Oregon, United States; 44.5642°N 123.28675°W
- Owner: Oregon State University

Ode to a Tree is an outdoor 1977 sculpture by Le Roy (L. R.) Setziol, installed on the Oregon State University campus in Corvallis, Oregon, in the United States.

== Description and history ==
L. R. Setziol's Ode to a Tree (1977) is an Alaskan yellow cedar sculpture installed in the Forest Science Laboratory's courtyard on Jefferson Street, on the Oregon State University campus. The abstract, "tree-like" form measures 20 feet (6.1 m) x 12 feet (3.7 m), 7 inches (18 cm) x 16 feet (4.9 m), 2 inches (5.1 cm). The bottom of one side of the sculpture features a bicycle parking rack. The installation includes a plaque with the inscription:

ROBERT M. ROMANIER / MEMORIAL CHRISTMAS TREE / DEDICATED SEPTEMBER 2, 1980.

The sculpture was surveyed and deemed "treatment needed" by the Smithsonian Institution's "Save Outdoor Sculpture!" program in April 1993. It is part of the Percent for Art Collection and administered by Oregon State University.

== See also ==
- 1977 in art
