= Goose Hollow Inn =

Restaurant in Portland, Oregon, U.S.

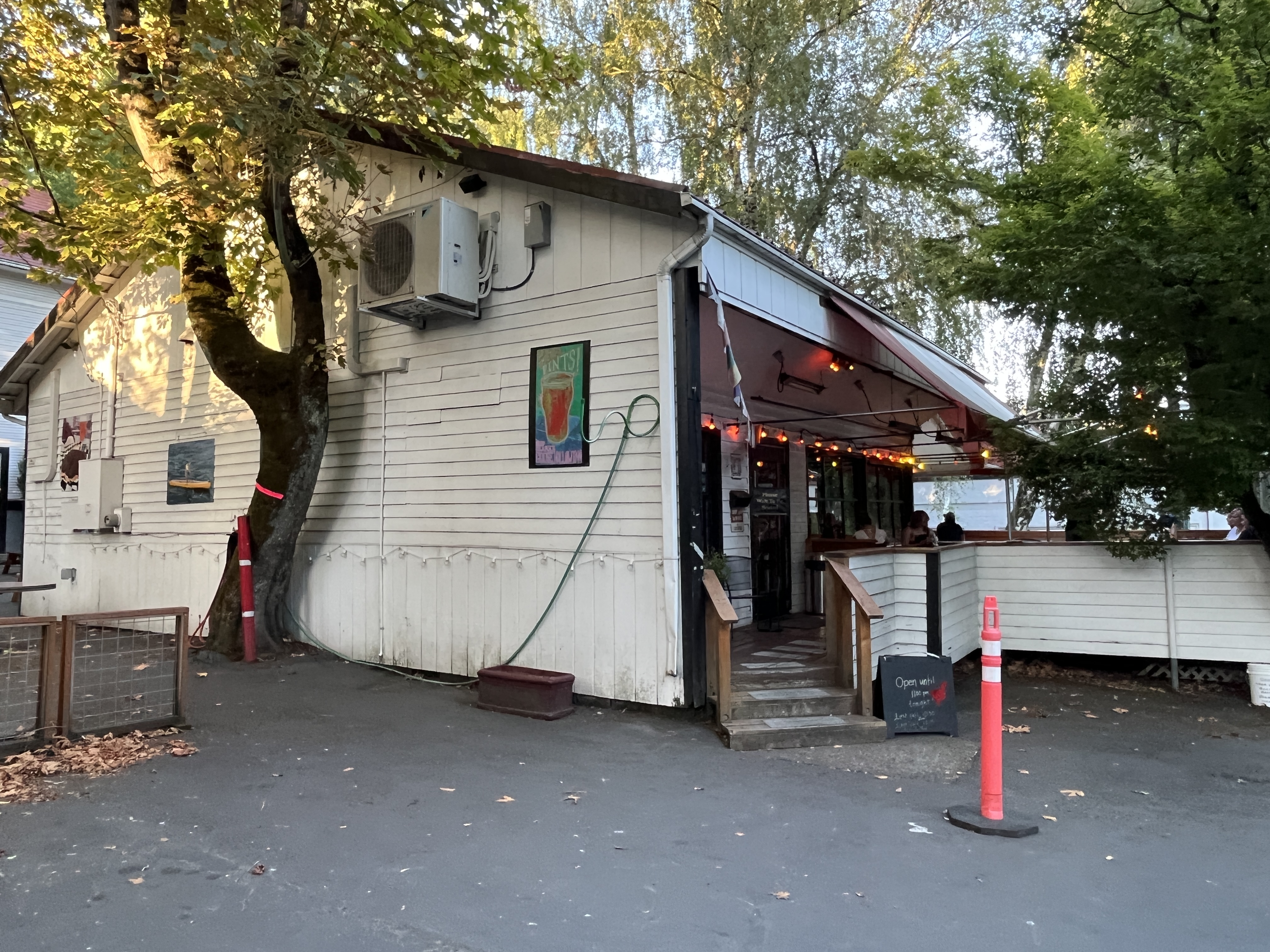
- The restaurant's exterior, 2022
- Interactive map of Goose Hollow Inn

Restaurant information
- Established: 1967
- Location: 1927 Southwest Jefferson Street, Portland, Multnomah, Oregon, 97201, United States
- Coordinates: 45.5184°N 122.6939°W
- Website: www.goosehollowinn.com

The Goose Hollow Inn is a tavern in Portland, Oregon, United States. The business was established in 1967 by Bud Clark, who served as mayor of Portland from 1985 to 1992.

== Description ==
The restaurant Goose Hollow Inn operates in Portland's Goose Hollow neighborhood. The business is best known locally for its Reuben sandwich. The tavern's mission statement, which is printed on the menus, states: "We are dedicated to Quality Draft, Fine Food, Pleasant Music, and Stimulating Company. We are also dedicated to extremes of opinion, hoping that a livable marriage will result. If physical violence is your nature, either develop your verbal ability or leave."

The walls of the interior are covered in artwork, photographs, posters, and old beer advertisements accumulated over the course of the tavern's history. They include a copy of Clark's iconic "Expose Yourself to Art" poster. The Goose Hollow Inn has a single television and, unlike many other taverns in Portland, no video poker machines. The former mayor described the business as his legacy during an interview with Oregon Public Broadcasting. "It's put together well, it still runs, my daughter runs it well,' he said. "And I've met so many friends here."

== History ==
Clark and his wife, Sigrid Fehrenbacher, originally bought the Spatenhaus Tavern in downtown Portland in 1962 for $1,600 and had to borrow money to purchase beer for its grand opening. The Spatenhaus closed and was demolished in 1967 to clear the way for the construction for the Ira Keller Fountain. That same year, Clark bought Ann's Tavern on Southwest 19th Avenue and Jefferson Street, rechristening it as the Goose Hollow Inn.

Clark wrote the tavern's mission statement following a bar fight between two patrons. Former state congressman Stephen Kafoury's experience at the Goose Hollow Inn in the 1970s helped end Oregon's rules which prohibited dancing in taverns. Clark told Kafoury he was not legally allowed to sing or dance on the property. The legislator later successfully managed to change the law.

Budweiser once credited the Goose Hollow Inn with selling more of their beer per square foot than any other tavern in the United States. In 1983, Clark dubbed the company "a tyrant" and vowed to stop purchasing their products following the appearance of several Budweiser employees in a television advertisement advocating against a voter-initiated referendum to create a law requiring deposits on beverage containers.

Fehrenbacher took over operations of the tavern when Clark ran for mayor in 1984 (and became mayor in 1985). Clark returned to manage the Goose Hollow Inn following his departure from politics at the end of 1992. In the years that followed, he continued to be a regular sight at both the tavern and the Fehrenbacher Hof, the coffeehouse next door that is also owned by the Clark family. In 2011, the restaurant hosted a release party for a book about the Goose Hollow neighborhood.

Clark's death on February 1, 2021, was marked by condolences from many of the business's regulars as well as public figures including Congressman Earl Blumenauer and City Commissioner Jo Ann Hardesty. The tavern and the adjacent coffeehouse continue to be owned and operated by the Clark family.

== Reception ==
In 2020, Goose Hollow Inn ranked number 82 on MEDIAmerica's list of the "100 Best Fan-Favorite Destinations in Oregon".
