= 1984 Portland, Oregon, mayoral election =

- May 15, 1984
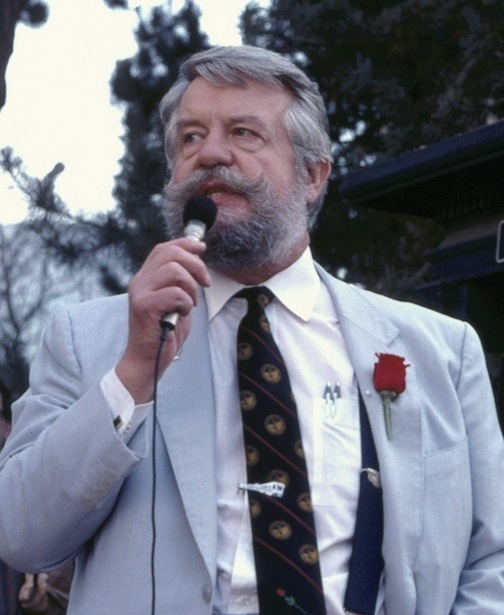

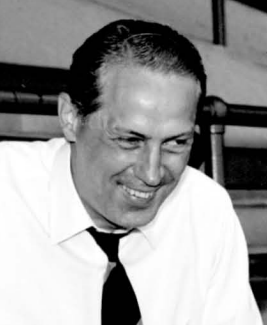
Nominee	Bud Clark	Frank Ivancie
Popular vote	64,073	50,228
Percentage	54.02%	42.35%
Mayor before election
Frank Ivancie
Elected mayor
Bud Clark

On May 15, 1984, an election was held in Portland, Oregon, to elect the mayor. Businessman Bud Clark defeated incumbent mayor Frank Ivancie.

Portland uses a nonpartisan system for local elections, in which all voters are eligible to participate. All candidates are listed on the ballot without any political party affiliation.

All candidates meeting the qualifications competed in a blanket primary election on May 15, 1988. Because Clark received an absolute majority of the vote in the primary election, no run-off election was held.

== Candidates ==
- Norman A. Berberick, engineer
- J. E. (Bud) Clark, owner of Goose Hollow Inn
- Frank Ivancie, incumbent mayor
- Stan Kahn
- Joe Kear
- Jeffrey Joseph James Liddicoat

== Results ==
1984 Portland mayoral election
Party	Candidate	Votes	%
Nonpartisan	Bud Clark	64,073	54.02
Nonpartisan	Frank Ivancie (incumbent)	50,228	42.35
Nonpartisan	Stan Kahn	2,422	2.04
Nonpartisan	Norman A. Berberick	695	0.58
Nonpartisan	Joe Kear	637	0.53
Nonpartisan	Jeffrey Joseph James Liddicoat	425	0.35
Write-in		111	0.09
Total votes		118,591	100
