= Mike Ryerson =

American historian and journalist

- Born: Michael Frederick Ryerson; May 7, 1940; Portland, Oregon, United States
- Died: January 6, 2015 (aged 74); Texas, United States
- Occupations: Newspaper editor, The Northwest Examiner
- Spouse: Lee Dunaway

Michael Frederick Ryerson (May 7, 1940 – January 6, 2015) was an American historian and journalist who is best known for being the photographer of the Expose Yourself to Art poster which portrays Bud Clark, future mayor of Portland, Oregon, flashing a bronze nude sculpture. Ryerson sold over 250,000 posters by 1984, just six years after the poster was created. Profits were used to support the Northwest Examiner newspaper, then called the Northwest Neighbor, which was started by Ryerson and Clark.

Ryerson was a close friend and advisor to Clark and is often credited with being the reason Clark won the mayoral election. Ryerson attended Jefferson High School and graduated in 1958 before joining the United States Navy for two years. He married Lee Dunaway and raised a family primarily in Northwest Portland.

Ryerson is credited with bringing back the term Slabtown. Ryerson also started Mike's History Tours with local historian Tanya March, which still exists as Slabtown Tours.

Ryerson died on January 6, 2015, while visiting family in Texas.
