= 1977 in art =

Events from the year 1977 in art.

== Events ==
- April 19 – Yale Center for British Art gallery, designed by Louis Kahn (died 1974), opens to the public in New Haven, Connecticut, United States.
- May 8–24 – Suzanne Lacy's extended performance piece about rape, Three Weeks in May takes place in Los Angeles.
- September 12 – American poet Robert Lowell dies having suffered a heart attack in the back of a cab in New York City while returning to his ex-wife Elizabeth Hardwick carrying a portrait of his current wife Lady Caroline Blackwood by her first husband Lucian Freud.
- Starr Kempf constructs the first of his "wind sculptures".
- documenta 6 takes place.
- Douglas Crimp curates "Pictures," featuring Jack Goldstein, Cindy Sherman, Sherrie Levine and others, at Artists Space in New York.
- Tehran Museum of Contemporary Art in Iran, designed by Kamran Diba, is inaugurated.

=== Awards ===
- Archibald Prize: Kevin Connor – Robert Klippel

== Exhibitions ==
- Retrospective of Valentine Hugo at the Centre Culturel Thibaud de Champagne, Troyes.
- Retrospective of Frida Kahlo at the Instituto Nacional de Bellas Artes, Mexico City.

== Works ==
- Marina Abramović and Ulay – Expansion in Space
- Walter De Maria – The Lightning Field (land art)
- Audrey Flack - Marilyn (Vanitas)
- Lucian Freud – Naked Man with Rat
- Tina Girouard - "Pinwheel" (performance installation at the New Orleans Museum of Art)
- Gilbert & George – Series of Red Morning works
- David Hockney – My Parents
- Donald Judd – Untitled (Meter Box)
- Nabil Kanso – The Vortices of Wrath (Lebanon 1977)
- Lee Krasner - Future Indicative
- Jacob Lawrence – Self-portrait
- Jacques Lipchitz – Bellerophon Taming Pegasus (sculpture, New York City)
- Kathleen McCullough – Cat in Repose (sculpture, Portland, Oregon)
- Gordon Matta-Clark – Jacob's Ladder
- Ivan Meštrović – Martin Kukučín (sculptures)
- Robert Morris – Williams Mirrors
- Maria Prymachenko - Two-Headed Chicken
- David Shepherd – Tiger in the Sun
- Cindy Sherman – Untitled Film Stills (through 1980)
- C. Talacca – Bust of Simón Bolívar (bronze, Houston, Texas)
- Jean Tinguely – Tinguely Fountain and Carnival Fountain (Fasnachtsbrunnen) (both kinetic sculptures in Basel)
- Don Wilson – Interlocking Forms (sculpture, Portland, Oregon)
- Felix de Weldon – Statue of Ty Cobb (bronze, Royston, Georgia)
- Audrey Flack - World War II (Vanitas)

== Births ==
- 8 February – Yucef Merhi, Venezuelan artist, poet and computer programmer.
- 16 April – Florentijn Hofman, Dutch installation artist.
- 14 May – Emeka Ogboh, Nigerian sound and installation artist.
- 5 October – Hugleikur Dagsson, Icelandic cartoonist
- Michael Dean, English sculptor.
- Gregory Halpern, American photographer.

== Deaths ==
- 27 April – Charles Alston, American artist, muralist, and teacher (b. 1907).
- 27 June – Ivan Tabaković, Serbian painter (b. 1898)
- 3 July – Gertrude Abercrombie, American painter (b. 1909).
- 21 July – Lee Miller, American photographer (b. 1907).
- 22 July –Pan Yuliang, Chinese painter (b. 1899)
- 23 August – Naum Gabo, Russian sculptor (b. 1890).
- 3 September – Gianni Vella, Maltese painter and cartoonist (b. 1885)
- 11 September – Augustus Dunbier, American painter (b. 1888).
- 23 September – John Nash, English painter, illustrator, and engraver (b. 1893).
- 25 September – William McMillan, Scottish sculptor (b. 1887) (victim of assault).
- 20 October – Marie-Thérèse Walter, mistress of Pablo Picasso (b. 1909).
- 4 November – Keith Vaughan, English painter (b. 1912) (suicide).
- 5 November – René Goscinny, French comic book author, editor and humorist (b. 1926).
- 21 December – Seán Keating, Irish romantic-realist painter (b. 1889).
- 31 December – Tore Asplund, Swedish-born American painter (b. 1903).

=== Full date unknown ===
- Philip Lindsey Clark, English sculptor (b. 1889)
- Walter Pritchard, Scottish stained glass artist, muralist and sculptor (b. 1905)

== See also ==
- 1977 in fine arts of the Soviet Union
