= Holon (sculpture) =

Sculpture in Portland, Oregon

- The sculpture in 2015
- Artist: Donald Wilson
- Year: 1978–1979 (re-carved 2003–2004)
- Type: Sculpture
- Medium: White Indiana Limestone (original); Granite (re-carved)
- Dimensions: 1.4 m × 0.91 m × 0.46 m (54 in × 36 in × 18 in)
- Condition: "Treatment needed" (1993)
- Location: Portland, Oregon, United States; 45.51134°N 122.68543°W
- Owner: City of Portland and Multnomah County Public Art Collection courtesy of the Regional Arts & Culture Council

Holon, also known as Hōlon, is an outdoor stone sculpture by Donald Wilson, located in the South Park Blocks in Portland, Oregon, United States. It was originally commissioned in 1978–1979 and re-carved in 2003–2004. It is part of the City of Portland and Multnomah County Public Art Collection courtesy of the Regional Arts & Culture Council, which administers the work.

== Description and history ==
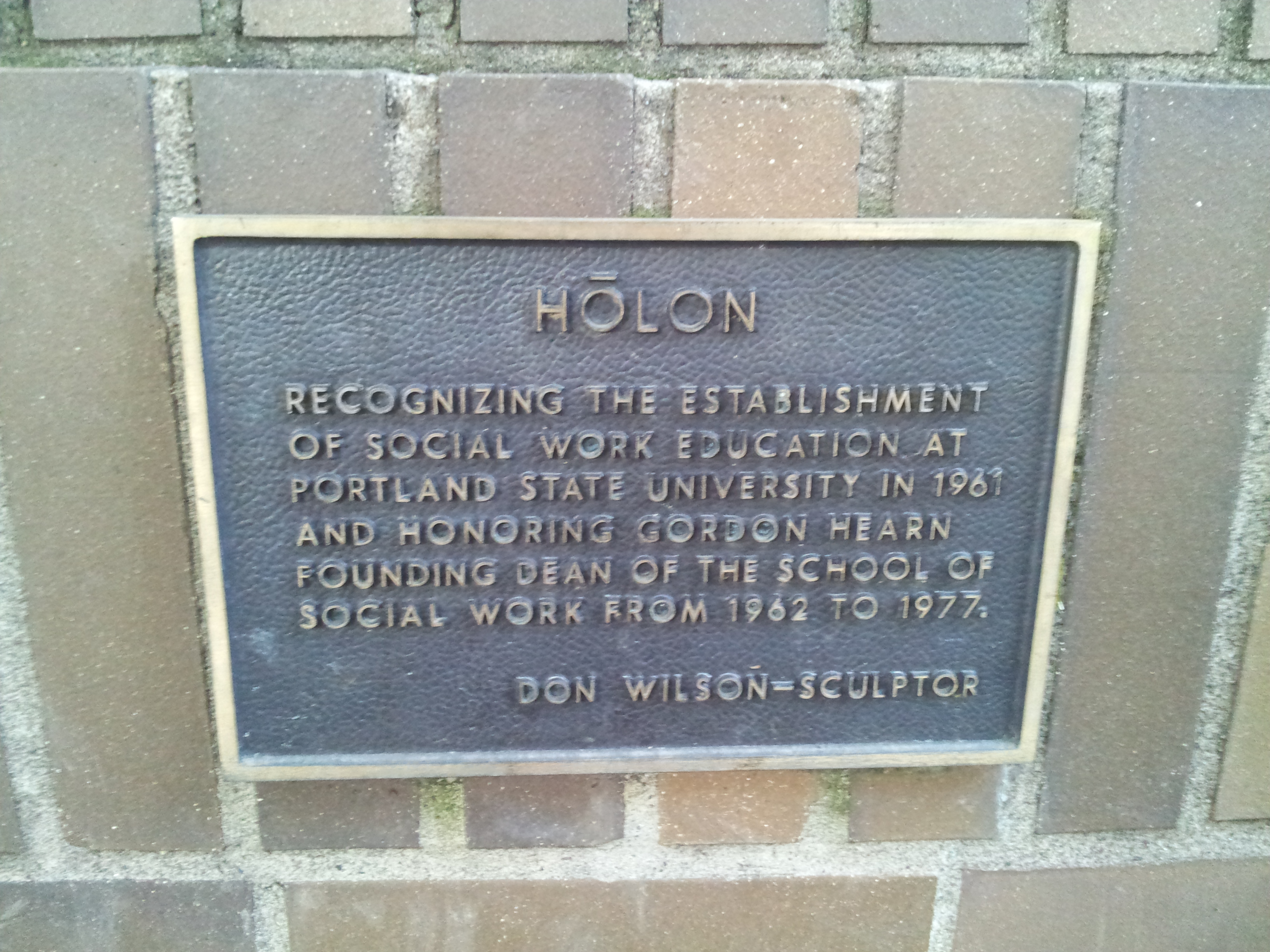
Plaque for the sculpture

Donald Wilson's Holon was originally commissioned in 1978–1979 and dedicated to the late Dr. Gordon Hearn, the first dean of Portland State University's School of Social Work. Its name comes from the Greek holos, which means "whole, entire, complete in all its parts – something that has integrity and identity at the same time as it is a part of a larger system". The sculpture was carved from white Indiana Limestone. It measured approximately 60 inches (1.5 m) x 33 inches (0.84 m) x 12 inches (0.30 m) and rested on a brick base that measured around 30 inches (0.76 m) x 24 inches (0.61 m) x 19.25 inches (0.489 m). When the Smithsonian Institution surveyed the sculpture for its "Save Outdoor Sculpture!" program in April 1993, the organization categorized the piece as abstract, its condition as "treatment needed", and noted that Wilson had removed graffiti previously.

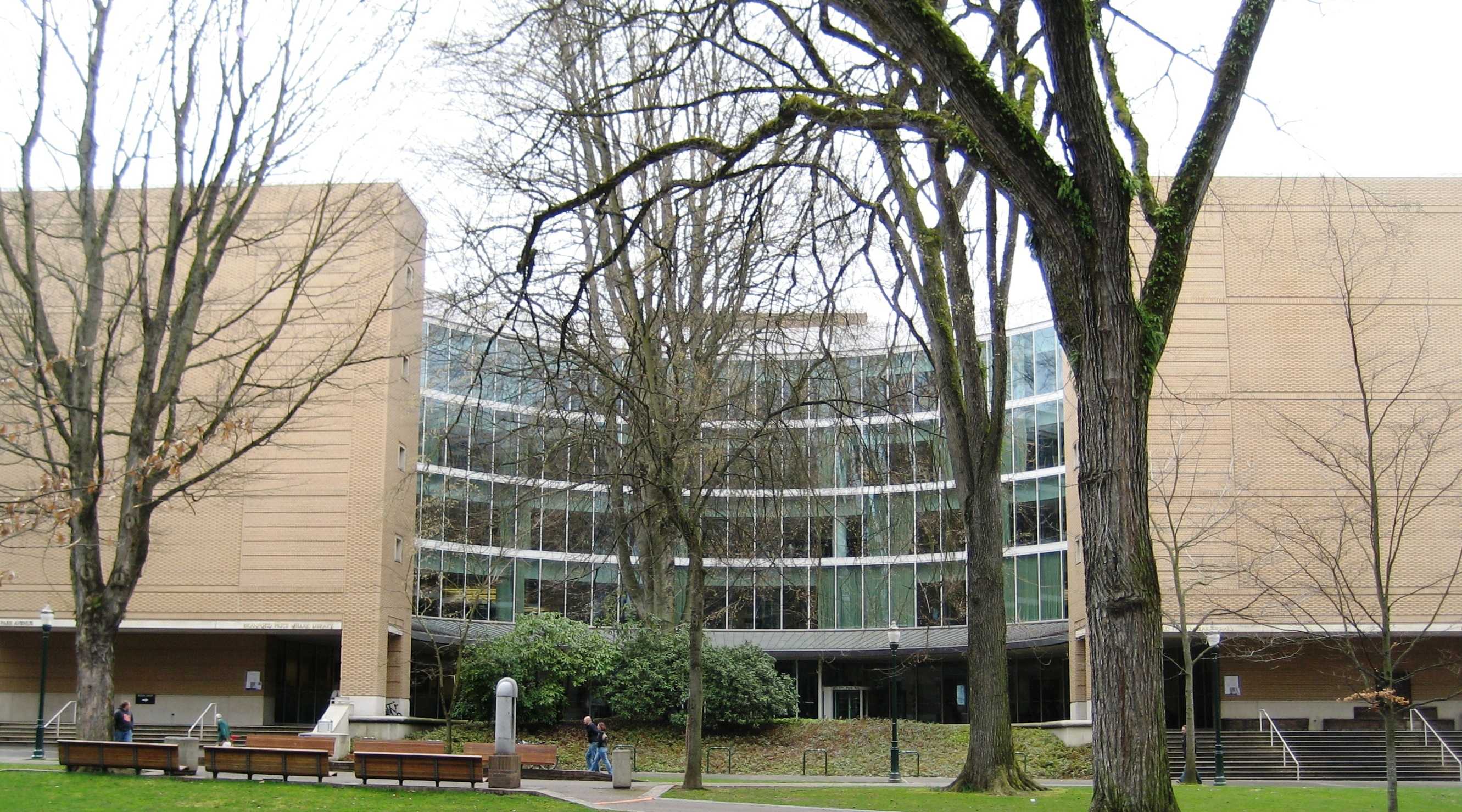
Holon in front of Portland State University's Branford Price Millar Library in 2009

The sculpture was re-carved from granite in 2003–2004 and installed in Portland's South Park Blocks, between Southwest Harrison and Southwest Hall streets in front of the Branford Price Millar Library, in 2004. The Regional Arts & Culture Council, which administers the work, describes it as reflective of the university's "holistic" design. The sculpture measures 54 inches (1.4 m) x 36 inches (0.91 m) x 18 inches (0.46 m). Its base includes a plaque that reads, "HOLON / RECOGNIZING THE ESTABLISHMENT / OF SOCIAL WORK EDUCATION AT / PORTLAND STATE UNIVERSITY IN 1961 / AND HONORING GORDON HEARN / FOUNDING DEAN OF THE SCHOOL OF / SOCIAL WORK FROM 1962–1977." The work is part of the City of Portland and Multnomah County Public Art Collection courtesy of the Regional Arts & Culture Council.

== See also ==
- 1979 in art
- 2004 in art
- Holism
  - Holon (philosophy)
- Interlocking Forms (1977), another Portland sculpture by Wilson
