= Statue of Mother Joseph =

Sculpture in Washington D.C.

Mother Joseph
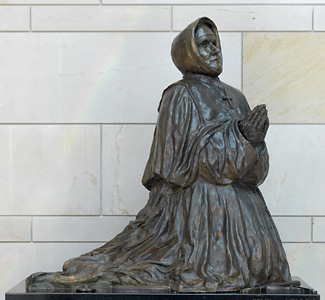
- Artist: Felix de Weldon
- Medium: Bronze sculpture
- Subject: Mother Joseph Pariseau
- Location: Washington, D.C., U.S.

Mother Joseph is a bronze sculpture depicting Mother Joseph Pariseau by Felix de Weldon, installed in the United States Capitol Visitor Center's Emancipation Hall, in Washington, D.C., as part of the National Statuary Hall Collection. The statue was gifted by the U.S. state of Washington in 1980.

== See also ==
- 1980 in art
