= Interlocking Forms =

Sculpture in Portland, Oregon, U.S.

- The sculpture in 2015
- Artist: Donald Wilson
- Year: 1977
- Type: Sculpture
- Medium: Indiana Limestone
- Condition: "Treatment needed" (1993)
- Location: Portland, Oregon, United States; 45.51996°N 122.67701°W

Interlocking Forms is an outdoor 1977 Indiana Limestone sculpture by Donald Wilson, located in downtown Portland, Oregon.

== Description and history ==
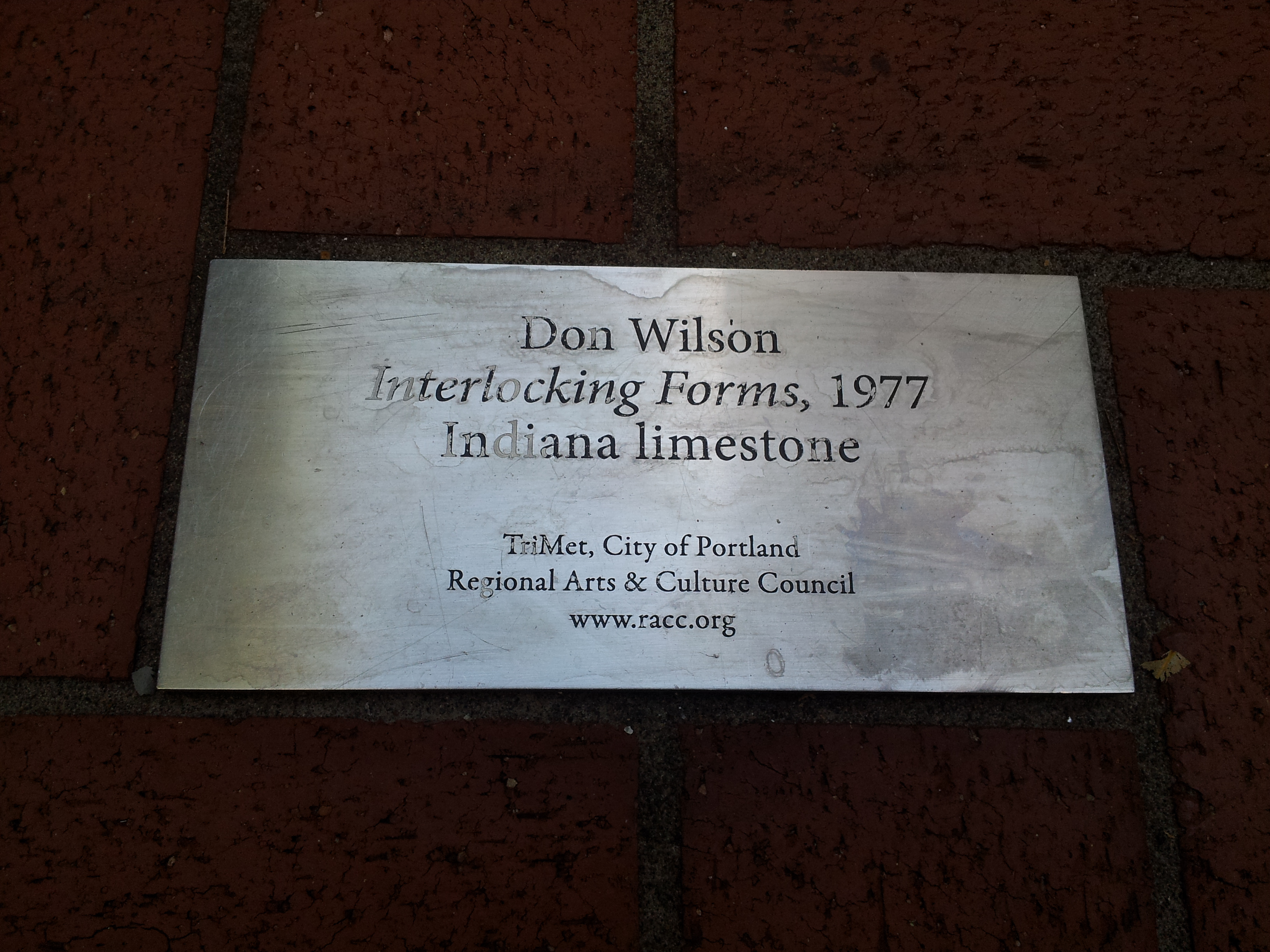
Plaque for the sculpture

Interlocking Forms is an abstract geometric sculpture by Donald Wilson, who intended to create "just a human kind of presence in its relation to human beings in the environment". It is made of Indiana Limestone and measures approximately 60 inches (1.5 m) x 18 feet (5.5 m) x 6 feet (1.8 m). The piece was commissioned by TriMet for $25,000; twenty percent of the funds came from TriMet and eighty percent came from the United States Department of Transportation. It was originally installed in the Transit Mall in 1977, along with ten other sculptures, to make the area "more people oriented and attractive". Its condition was deemed "treatment needed" by the Smithsonian Institution's "Save Outdoor Sculpture!" program in October 1993. In 2008, it was relocated to the intersection of Southwest 5th Avenue and Southwest Washington Street as part of the Portland Mall Revitalization Project.

== See also ==
- 1977 in art
- Holon (1978–1979; re-carved 2003–2004), another Portland sculpture by Wilson
