= Statue of Ty Cobb =

Monumental statue of baseball player Ty Cobb

Coordinates: 34°17′6.1″N 83°7′13.6″W

Ty Cobb statue
- Ty Cobb statue (2019)
- Location: Royston, Georgia, United States
- Designer: Felix de Weldon
- Material: Bronze
- Completion date: 1977
- Dedicated to: Ty Cobb

The Ty Cobb statue is a monumental statue of baseball player Ty Cobb. The statue, completed in 1977, was designed by Felix de Weldon and was located near Atlanta–Fulton County Stadium and later Turner Field in Atlanta, Georgia, United States. Following the Atlanta Braves' departure from Turner Field in 2017, the statue was relocated to Cobb's hometown of Royston, Georgia.

== History ==
Ty Cobb was born in Banks County, Georgia in 1886. As a professional American baseball player, he played for the Detroit Tigers from 1905 to 1926. He was inducted into the National Baseball Hall of Fame and Museum in 1936 and became a philanthropist later in life before dying in Atlanta in 1961. In 1977, Citizens & Southern National Bank president Mills Lane commissioned the sculptor Felix de Weldon to create a statue honoring Cobb. It was completed later that year and placed near Atlanta–Fulton County Stadium, later moving to Turner Field in 1997. At Turner Field, the statue was placed in Monument Grove, a park near the ticket window that included monuments to other baseball players, such as Hank Aaron and Phil Niekro.

In September 2015, as the Atlanta Braves were preparing to move from Turner Field to SunTrust Park, WXIA-TV reported that the statue of Cobb was not included in the list of items the Braves intended to bring with them to the new stadium. It was the only statue the Braves were not planning to relocate with them. The Braves stated that the reason for this was that the statue was owned by the Atlanta–Fulton County Recreation Authority and not the team. However, several sources alleged that the decision was due in part to Cobb's reputation, particularly with regards to race. While both the Recreation Authority and Georgia State University initially claimed the statue as their own, the statue was ultimately gifted to the Cobb's hometown of Royston, Georgia, where it was dedicated on May 21, 2017, in front of the Royston Public Library. In December, a large folk art painting of the statue's rededication was unveiled at the Ty Cobb Museum, also located in Royston.

== See also ==
- 1977 in art
