= Patrick Cudahy Memorial =

Artwork by Felix de Weldon

Coordinates: 42°57′33.2″N 87°50′55.2″W

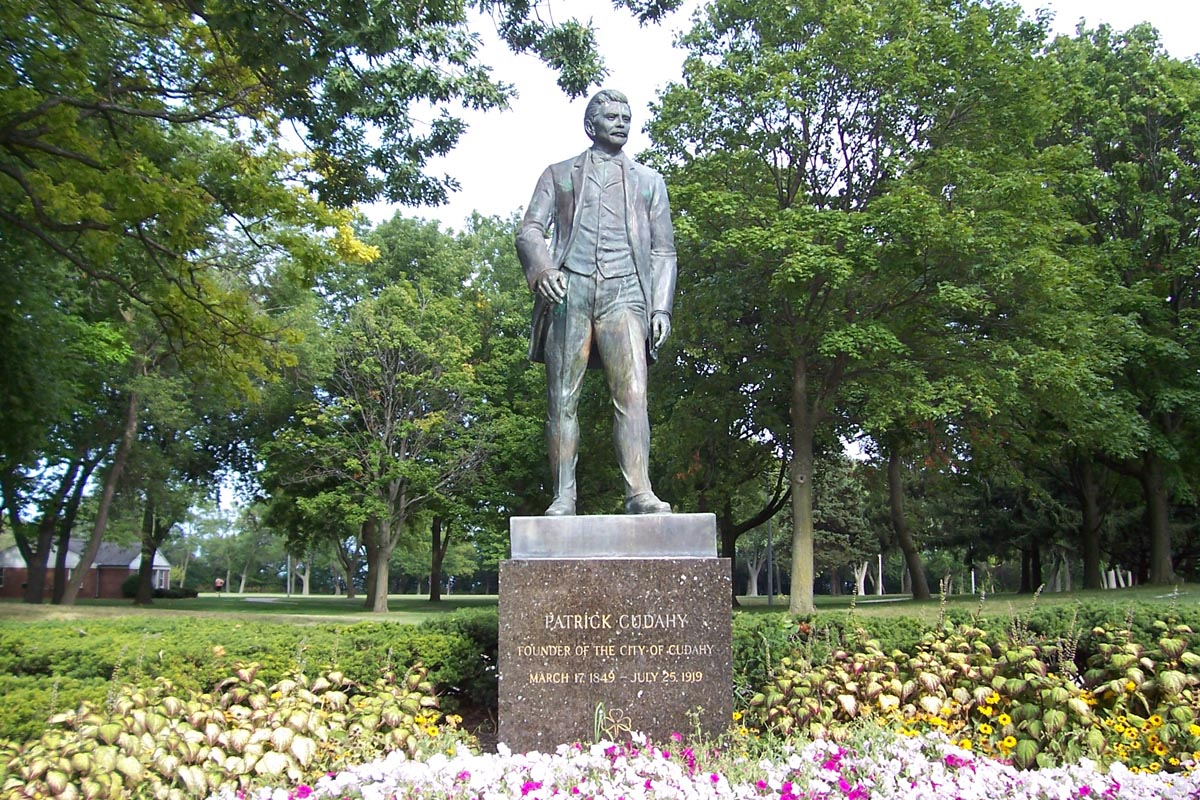
- Artist: Felix de Weldon
- Year: 1965
- Type: bronze
- Dimensions: 270 cm × 110 cm × 110 cm (108 in × 43 in × 43 in)
- Location: Milwaukee, Wisconsin
- Owner: Milwaukee County Parks Department

The Patrick Cudahy Memorial is a public art work by American artist Felix de Weldon, located in Sheridan Park in Cudahy, Wisconsin. The bronze sculpture depicts industrialist Patrick Cudahy standing and wearing a business suit. The inscription reads:
PATRICK CUDAHY
FOUNDER OF THE CITY OF CUDAHY
MARCH 17 1849 - JULY 25, 1919 (shamrock)
(Inscribed on side of base :)
Lover of shrubs, flowers, trees
(Inscribed on side of base:)
Founder of the City of Cudahy
