= Kvinneakt =

Statue in Portland, Oregon, U.S.

Coordinates: 45.5193°N 122.67835°W

- Nude Woman (English)
- Kvinneakt in front of MAX Light Rail tracks in 2012
- Artist: Norman J. Taylor
- Year: 1973–1975
- Type: Sculpture
- Medium: Bronze
- Dimensions: 180 cm × 97 cm × 64 cm (71 in × 38 in × 25 in)
- Location: Portland, Oregon
- Owner: City of Portland and Multnomah County Public Art Collection courtesy of the Regional Arts & Culture Council

Kvinneakt ("female nude" in Norwegian) is an abstract bronze sculpture located on the Transit Mall of downtown Portland, Oregon. Designed and created by Norman J. Taylor between 1973 and 1975, the work was funded by TriMet and the United States Department of Transportation and was installed on the Transit Mall in 1977. The following year Kvinneakt appeared in the "Expose Yourself to Art" poster which featured future Mayor of Portland Bud Clark flashing the sculpture. It remained in place until November 2006 when it was removed temporarily during renovation of the Transit Mall and the installation of the MAX Light Rail on the mall.

Originally located on Fifth Avenue, the sculpture was reinstalled on the mall in 2009 at a different location, on SW Sixth Avenue between Alder and Morrison, where it remains. According to TriMet, Kvinneakt is one of 40 public art sculptures in the Transit Mall's art collection. The sculpture is part of the City of Portland and Multnomah County Public Art Collection courtesy of the Regional Arts & Culture Council and is administered by the City of Portland Metropolitan Arts Commission.

== History ==
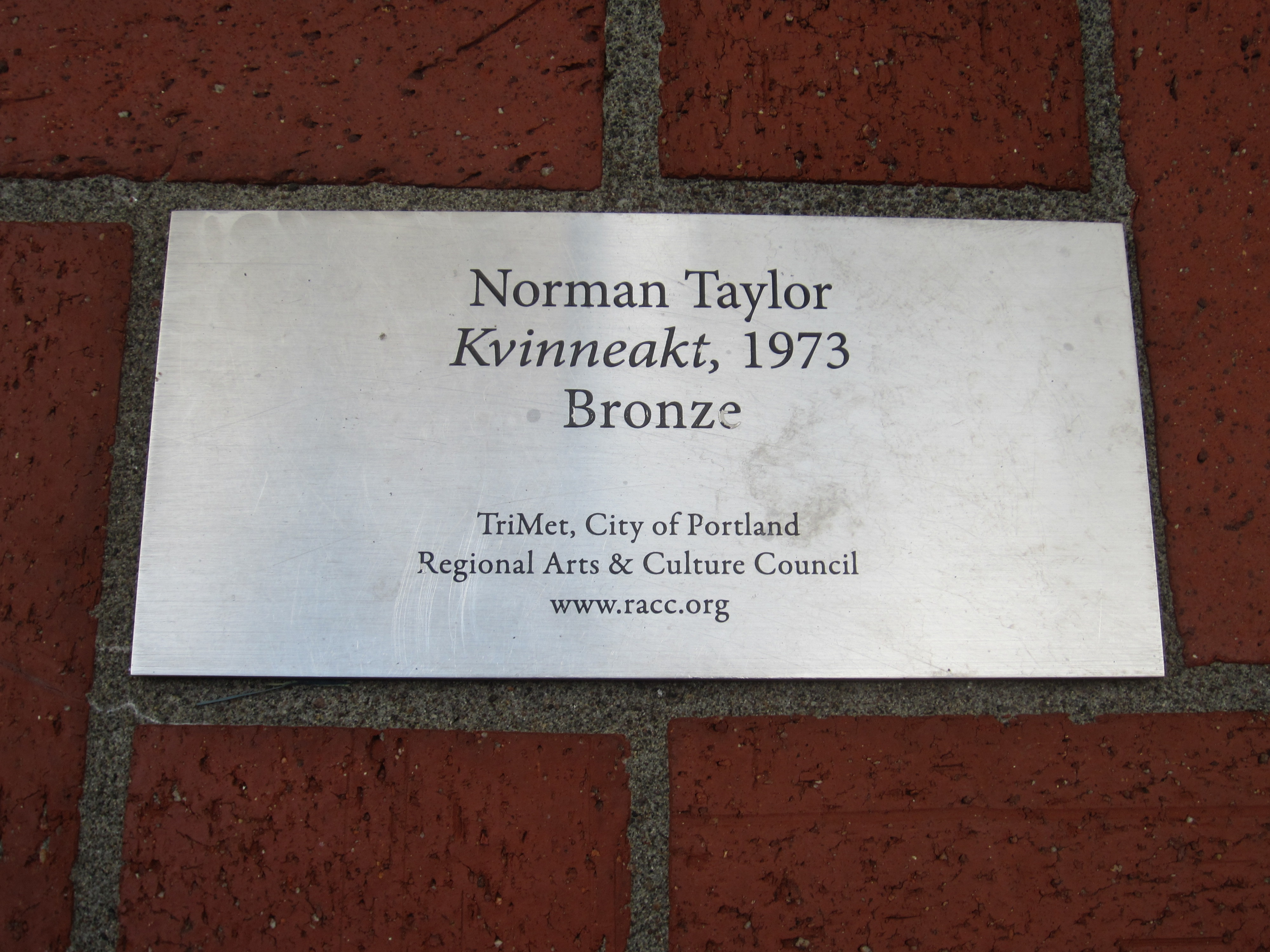
Plaque for Kvinneakt

Kvinneakt was designed and created by Norman J. Taylor, a Seattle-based artist and professor of sculpture at the University of Washington, between 1973 and 1975. The piece is an abstract bronze sculpture depicting a full-length nude woman measuring 71" x 38" x 25". Kvinneakt was one of 11 sculptures selected for the Portland Transit Mall from more than 500 entries entered in a juried competition. The works were purchased through a budget of $250,000; Kvinneakt was commissioned at a cost of $6,500. Funding sources for the project included Tri-Met (20 percent) and the United States Department of Transportation (80 percent). Of the 11 sculptures, only Kvinneakt and Kathleen McCullough's (née Conchuratt) Cat in Repose were considered "figurative". Claiming his intention was not to be vulgar, Taylor said: "It's about grace and motion and a certain beauty and pride in the human figure. That may be sensual, but that's far different from sex." According to the Regional Arts & Culture Council, Taylor intended the piece to be "confrontational"; he admitted, "the worst reaction you could give my work is no reaction."

Kvinneakt was installed on the newly built Transit Mall in 1977. The bronze sculpture was sited on SW Fifth Avenue near Washington Street (between Washington and Stark). In 1978, Kvinneakt appeared on the "Expose Yourself to Art" poster, which featured future Portland Mayor Bud Clark flashing the nude woman.

In 1981, about 30 minutes before the start of April Fools' Day, three men attempted to steal the 250-pound (110 kg) statue, breaking it free from its pedestal and dragging it towards a waiting car before being spotted by a city worker and fleeing the scene. Damage from the incident included a broken right index finger and other cracks. Repairs cost $3,000 and were undertaken by Norman Taylor, who also strengthened the sculpture's body and its connections to its base. Kvinneakt was reinstalled at Fifth Avenue and Washington six months later, in October 1981.

The sculpture has served as a stop on walking tours of the city, including the Metropolitan Arts Commission's 1987 Portland Public Art walking tour and the 2003 Public Art Conference's walking tour of downtown. On November 7, 2006, Kvinneakt was temporarily removed for renovation of the Transit Mall and installation of the MAX Light Rail along the mall. Its removal was supervised by staff of the Regional Arts & Culture Council. During this time Kvinneakt and other removed works were cleaned and refurbished. In September 2009, the statue was re-sited on SW Sixth Avenue between Alder and Morrison. Representatives from the Regional Arts & Culture Council and the TriMet Public Art Program conducted the unveiling. According to the former organization's public art manager, the sculpture will likely remain in its current location for as long as 30 years.

There have been other instances when Kvinneakt was used to make a statement or act as a prop. On April Fools' Day, 1982, the Portland Rainmakers gathered around the sculpture, issued a proclamation condemning nudity, "even in statues, for viewing by the general public", and left the statue covered with a "size 42-plus", lacy bra. In 1984 the statue was vandalized with the painted text "Jesus Saves". In January 1985, on the day Bud Clark took the oath of office as Mayor of Portland, Kvinneakt was draped anonymously with a sash reading "Congratulations". In 2007 Tom Burkleaux, founder of New Deal Vodka, posted an image of the sculpture on the company's website with the woman's nipples airbrushed out, protesting censorship after the Alcohol and Tobacco Tax and Trade Bureau deemed the website "offensive". In 2012, Century of Action, a project of the Oregon Women's History Consortium, used the sculpture to promote women's suffrage by placing a "Votes for Women" sash across her chest as part of the organization's "Sash Project".

In October 2024, a satirical statue of Donald Trump called In Honor of a Lifetime of Sexual Assault by an unknown artist was installed beside Kvinneakt.

== Reception ==
Kvinneakt is often referred to as the most notorious of the sculptures installed in the Transit Mall during the 1970s. In addition to being somewhat controversial because it is a nude, the sculpture has also received mixed reviews as a work of art. In 1981, Taylor recalled that following the sculpture's first installation one man told him that "he ought to be ashamed of himself." In 1985, Jeff Kuechle of The Oregonian listed the work as one of the city's "worst sculptures". In the article, Claire Kelly, director of Portland State University's art and architecture program said, "She's more than simplistic, she's absurd. It's not a piece that belongs on public display." In contrast, Monk Magazine described the sculpture as "the best-looking girl in Portland" with "her stunning eyes and voluptuous figure". According to the magazine, Portland is the only city in the United States with a "flasher statue". The sculpture was included in Kate Chynoweth's 2003 book, The Best Places to Kiss in the Northwest: A Romantic Travel Guide, as one of Portland's "romantic highlights".

== See also ==
- Depictions of nudity
