= Martin Kukučín (sculpture) =

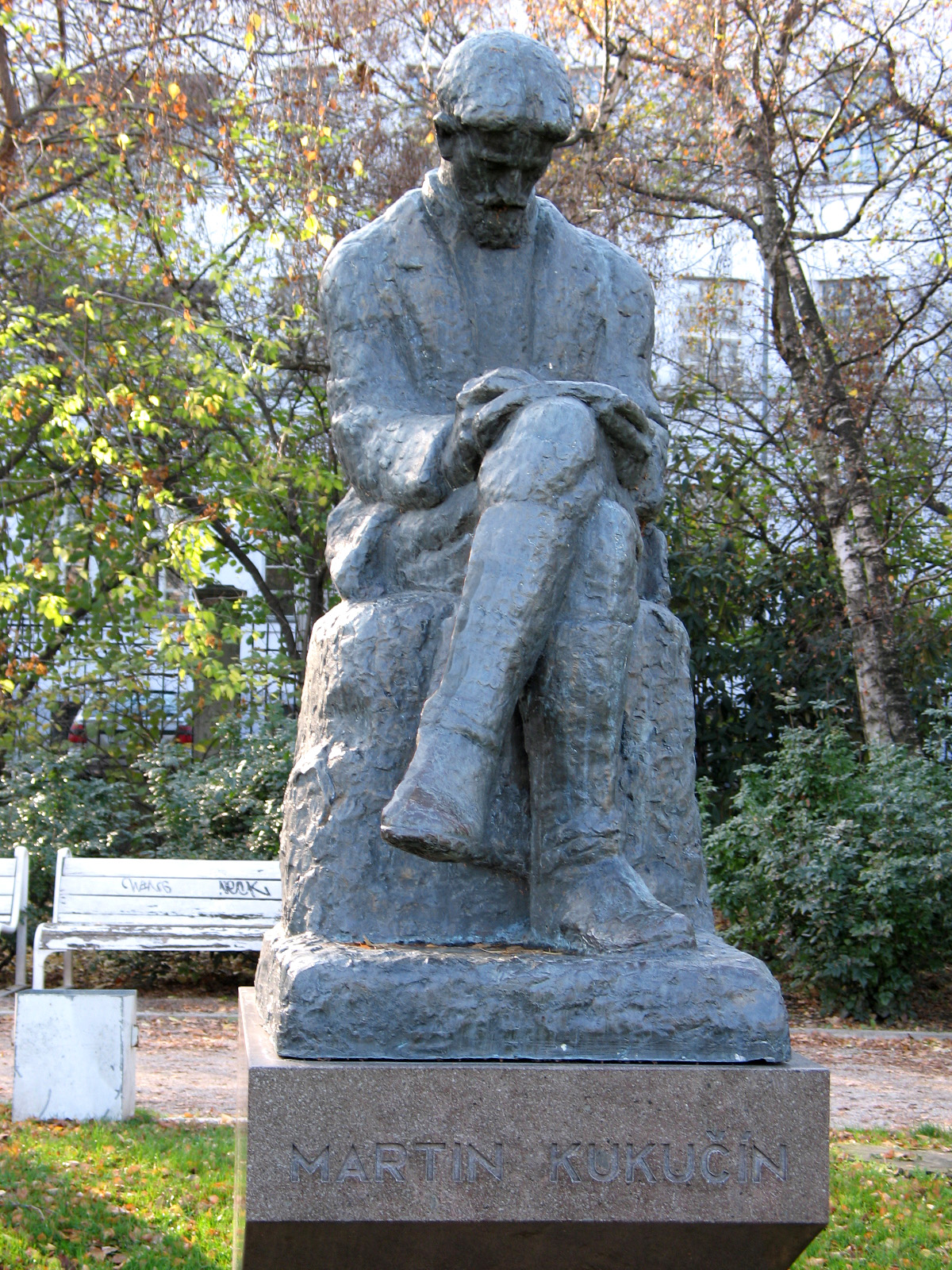
- The sculpture in Bratislava in 2008
- Artist: Ivan Meštrović
- Type: Sculpture
- Medium: Bronze
- Subject: Martin Kukučín
- Condition: Corvallis: "Treatment needed" (1993)
- Location: Bratislava, Slovakia; Corvallis, Oregon, United States

The Martin Kukučín statue is a sculpture of the Slovak writer of the same name by Ivan Meštrović. Copies exist in Bratislava, Slovakia and on the Oregon State University campus in Corvallis, Oregon, in the United States. The statue depicts Kukučín seated with his legs crossed, wearing a suit and boots. He holds an open book in his hands, on his lap.

== Bratislava, Slovakia ==
The Martin Kukučín statue in Bratislava is in the Medic Garden (Medická záhrada) in Old Town, near the Ondrejský Cemetery. (48°08′58.1″N 17°07′09.3″E)

== Oregon State University ==
The bronze Martin Kukučín statue on the Oregon State University campus in Corvallis, Oregon, dated 1977, is installed on the west side of The Valley Library (44°33.905′N 123°16.598′W). It measures 6.5 feet (2.0 m) tall, 36 inches (0.91 m) wide, and 63 inches (1.6 m) long. It rests on a concrete base that is approximately 13 inches (0.33 m) tall and has a 9-foot (2.7 m) diameter. The installation includes a plaque with the inscription:

MARTIN KUKUCIN 1860-1928 / AUTHOR AND PHYSICIAN / BY / IVAN MESTROVIC 1883-1962 / SCULPTOR.

The work was surveyed and deemed "treatment needed" by Smithsonian Institution's "Save Outdoor Sculpture!"program in April 1993.

== See also ==
- 1977 in art
