= Martin Kukučín =

Slovak prose writer, dramatist and publicist

Martin Kukučín

Martin Kukučín (real name Matej Bencúr, 17 May 1860, Jasenová, – 21 May 1928, Pakrac) was a Slovak prose writer, dramatist and publicist. He was the most notable representative of Slovak literary realism, and is considered one of the founders of modern Slovak prose.

== Biography ==
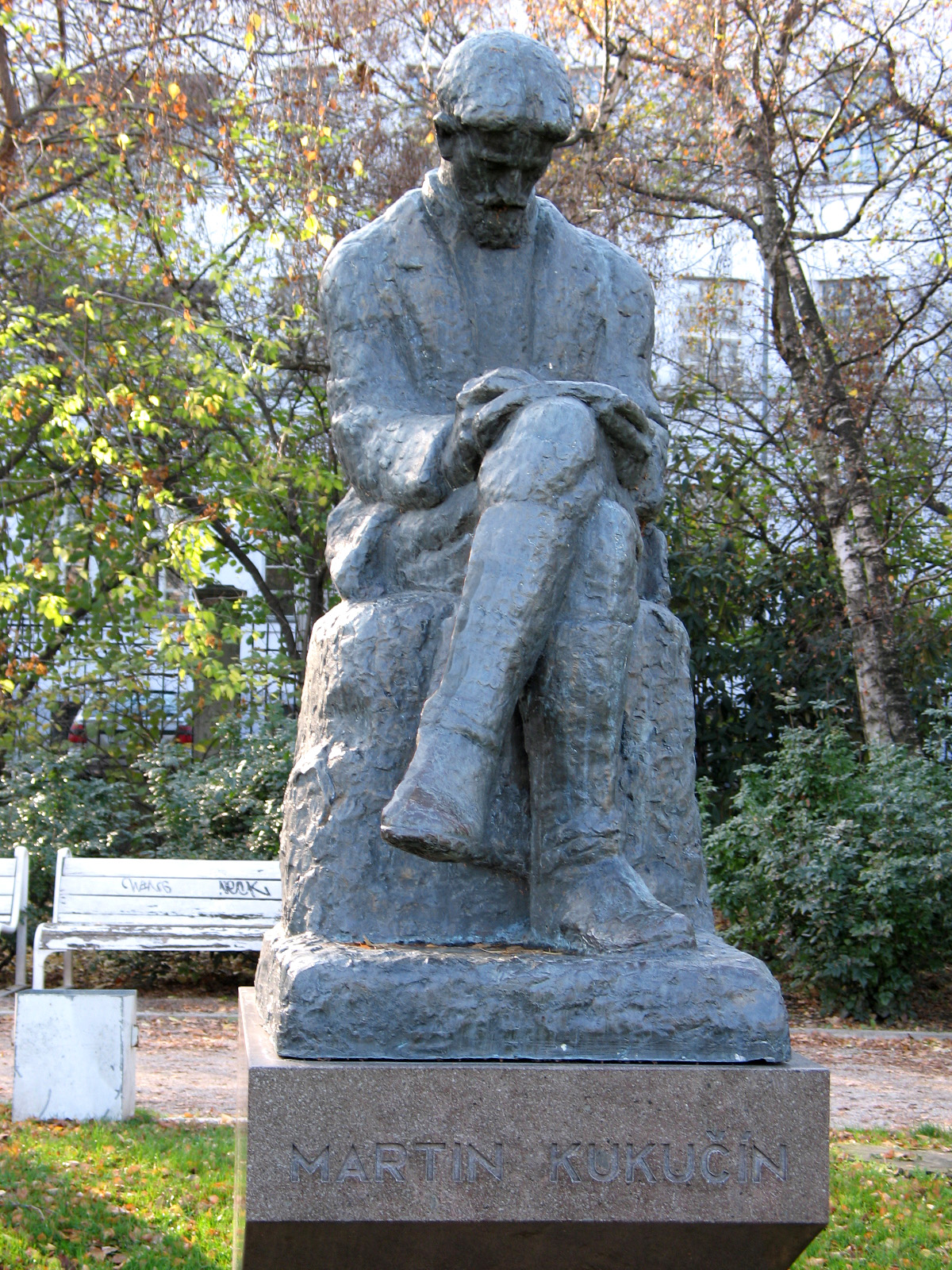
Martin Kukučín statue in Medical garden in Bratislava

He was born into a family of freemen, or soltys, the son of Ján Bencúr Juriš and his wife Zuzana, née Pašková, and had two brothers and one sister. He was educated at the Slovak 'gymnasium' in Revúca, Martin, Banská Bystrica, Kežmarok, and finished his education in Sopron. Although he wished to study theology in Bratislava, due to the anti-Slovak atmosphere prevailing at that time, he chose to study medicine in Prague instead.

After graduating and completing his internship in Bratislava, Innsbruck and Vienna, he attempted without success to find employment in Slovakia. Instead in 1893 he began to work as a doctor in the village of Selca on the island of Brač in Croatia, where he was also an active member of the cultural society Hrvatski Sastanak. In 1904, he became one of its directors. In 1896–97, he tried unsuccessfully to return to Slovakia.

In 1904, he married Perica Didolić, with whom he left in 1908 for South America, where they settled in Punta Arenas, Chile, where there was a large community of Croatian émigrés. During 1922–24, he lived again in Slovakia (Czechoslovakia at that time), then moved to Croatia in 1924–25, briefly returning to Chile in 1925 to resolve property disputes. In 1926, he finally settled in Lipik, a spa town in Croatia, where he died in 1928. Temporarily buried in Zagreb, he was interred in the National Cemetery in Martin in October 1928.

On May 17, 2010, Google Doodle commemorated Martin Kukucin's 150th birthday.

== Works ==
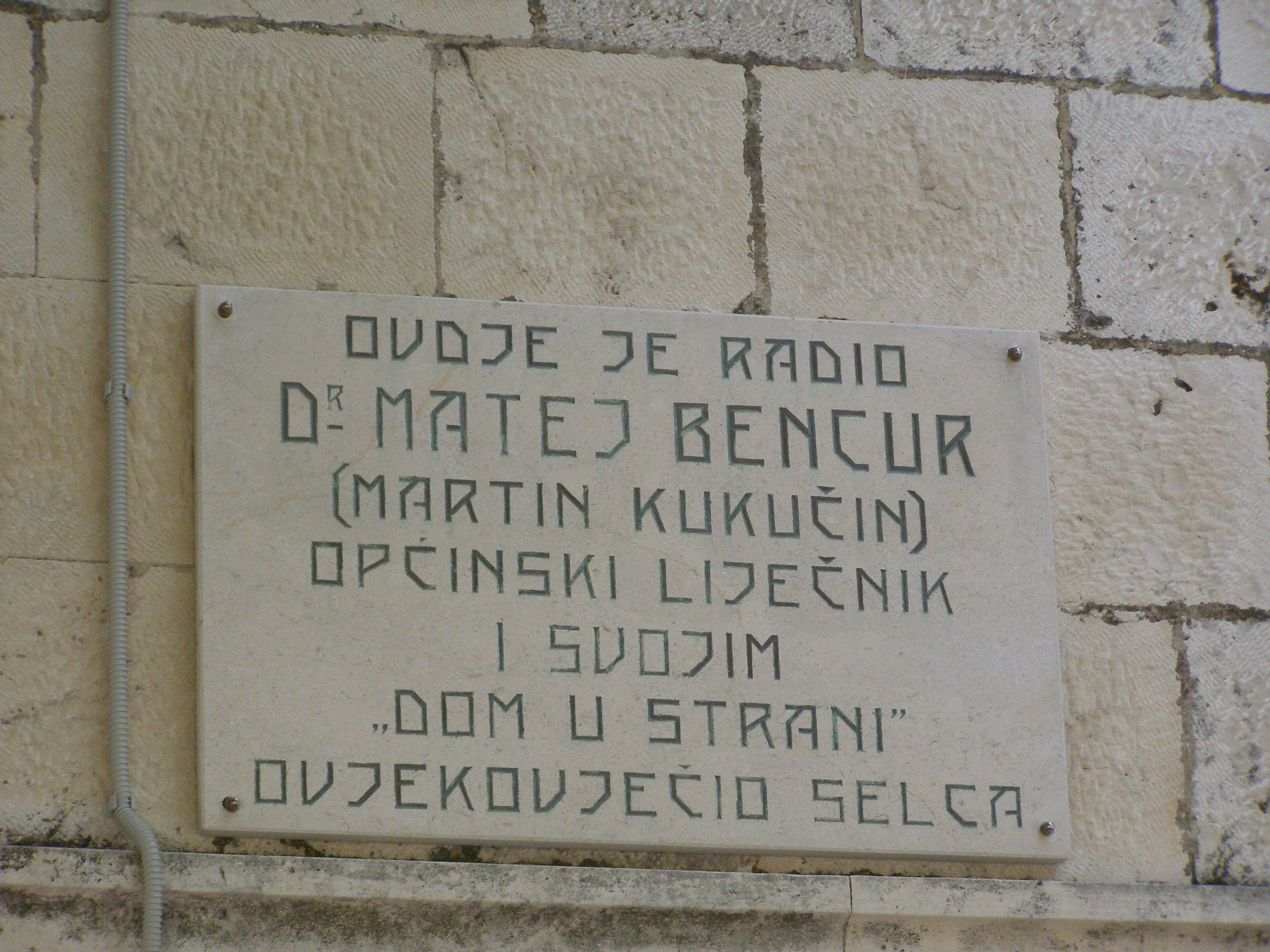
Commemorative plaque in Selca, Croatia

=== Prose ===
- 1883 - Na hradskej ceste
- 1885 - Rysavá jalovica
- 1886 - Neprebudený
- 1890 - Keď báčik z Chocholova umrie
- 1891 - Na podkonickom bále
- 1892 - Koniec a začiatok
- 1892 - Dve cesty
- 1893 - Dies Irae
- 1898 - V Dalmácii a Čiernej Hore, travelogue
- 1899 - Hody
- 1911 / 1912 - Dom v stráni, novel set in Brač
- 1922 - Črty z ciest. Prechádzky po Patagónii, travelogue
- 1922 - Mladé letá, memoirs about his student years
- 1926 - Mať volá, novel about Croatian emigrants in Chile
- 1929 - Bohumil Valizlosť Zábor, historical novel
- 1929 - Lukáš Blahosej Krasoň, historical novel
- 1930 - Košútky. Klbká. Rozmarínový mládnik.
- Čas tratí - čas platí
- Máje, poviedka
- Pán majster Obšíval
- Na jarmok
- Na Ondreja,
- Hajtman, poviedka
- Obecné trampoty
- Z teplého hniezda
- Veľkou lyžicou
- Panský hájnik
- O Michale
- Na svitaní
- Ako sa kopú poklady
- Pozor na čižmy
- Sviatočné dumy
- Tri roje cez deň
- Svadba
- Parník
- Štedrý deň

=== Drama ===
- 1907 - Komasácia
- 1922 - Bacuchovie dvor
- 1924 - Obeta

== See also ==
- Martin Kukučín (sculpture)
