= Statue of Dennis Chávez =

Statue in the United States Capitol

Dennis Chávez
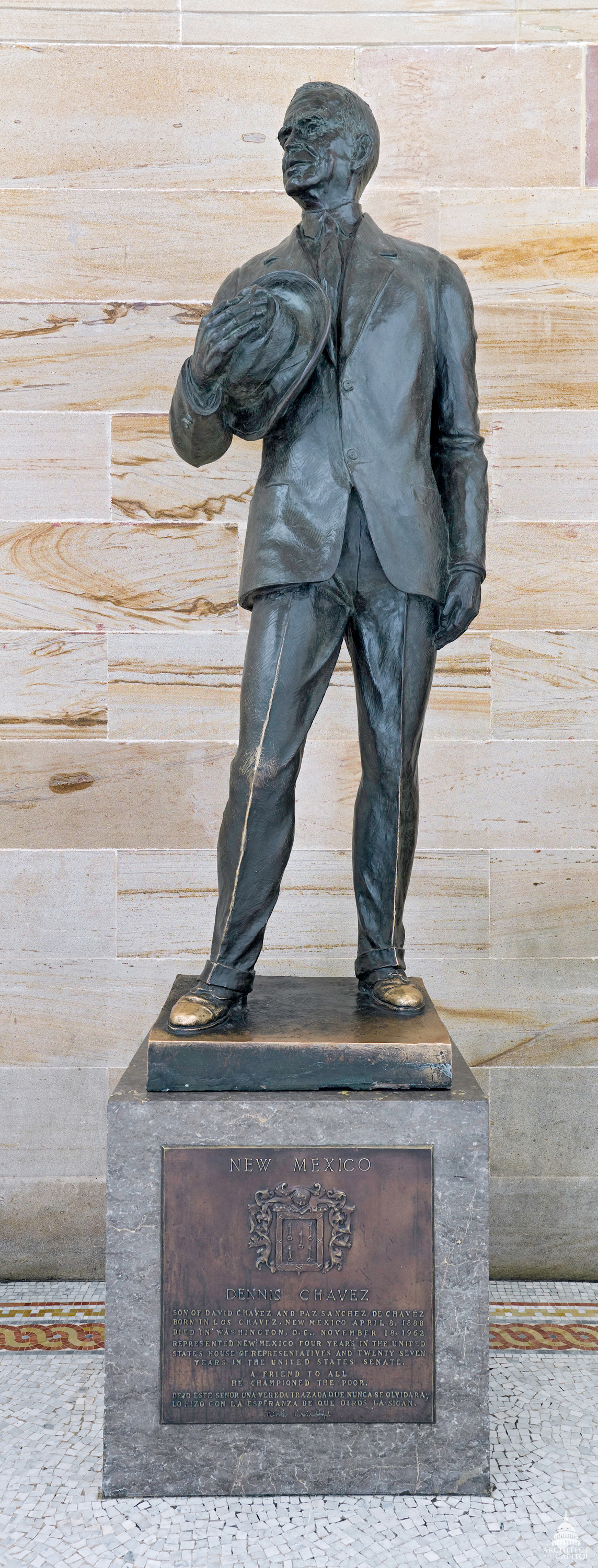
- The sculpture in the United States Capitol, 2011
- Artist: Felix de Weldon
- Medium: Bronze sculpture
- Subject: Dennis Chávez
- Location: Washington, D.C., United States

Dennis Chávez is a bronze sculpture depicting the politician of the same name by Felix de Weldon, installed in the United States Capitol in 1966, in Washington D.C., as part of the National Statuary Hall Collection. It is one of two statues donated by the state of New Mexico.

The statue is one of three that De Weldon has had placed in the Collection.
