= Joseph Pariseau =

Religious sister and pioneer

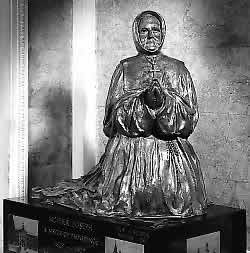
- Statue of Mother Joseph in the National Statuary Hall Collection
- Born: Esther Pariseau; April 16, 1823; Saint-Elzéar, Quebec, Canada
- Died: January 19, 1902 (aged 78); Vancouver, Washington, U.S.

Joseph Parisseau, religious name Joseph of the Sacred Heart, SP (born Esther Pariseau; 16 April 1823 – 19 January 1902) was a Canadian religious sister who led a group of members from her congregation to the Pacific Northwest of the United States. There, under her leadership, they established a network of schools and healthcare to service the American settlers in that new and remote part of the country. She was a member of the Sisters of Providence (Montreal).

During her ministry, she became the first female architect in British Columbia. For her contributions to the development of that region, she was honored by the State of Washington as one of the two people allowed to represent it in the National Statuary Hall Collection in Washington, D.C.

== Life ==
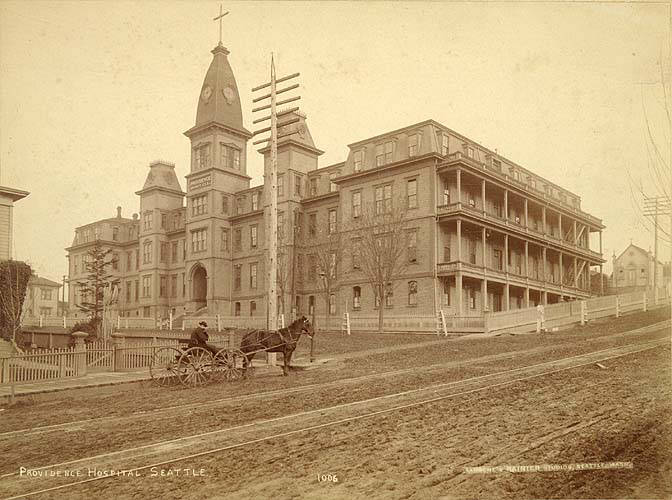
Providence Hospital (built 1882–1883; destroyed 1911), Fifth and Madison in Seattle, Washington

She was born Esther Pariseau in Saint-Elzéar, three miles (4.8 km) from Saint-Martin, Laval, Quebec, Canada. In 1843, at the age of 20, she entered a convent of the newly founded Sisters of Charity of Providence (now Sisters of Providence) in Montreal. At that time, her father, a carriagemaker who had accompanied her, is said to have remarked to the Mother Superior, "I bring you my daughter, Esther, who wishes to dedicate herself to the religious life. She can read, write, figure accurately, sew, cook, spin and do all manner of housework. She can even do carpentering, handling a hammer and saw as well as her father. She can also plan for others and she succeeds in anything she undertakes. I assure you, Madame, that she will make a good Superior some day." She took the name Sister Joseph in honor of her father.

In 1856, Augustin-Magloire Blanchet, the bishop of the new Diocese of Nesqually (now the Archdiocese of Seattle), approached the Sisters of Providence in Montreal, seeking their assistance for his diocese in the Pacific Northwest Territories of the United States. Mother Joseph was chosen to lead four companions as missionaries to that region. Accompanied by the bishop, they spent over a month traveling from Montreal arriving on the 8 December of that year. They traveled to New York by train and to Panama by ship. They crossed the Isthmus of Panama by the Panama Canal Railway and then went to Oregon aboard the steamboat Brother Jonathon. They arrived only to find that the Vicar General had expected them to settle elsewhere and had not made arrangements for their housing. Their first days were spent sleeping in the attic of the bishop's small home.

Within a few months, the Sisters had made their home in Vancouver, Washington. A small cabin served as both their convent and first school, which opened 14 April 1857. They accepted into their care several orphans and an elderly man who was homeless. Bishop Blanchet gave them two acres on the St. James Mission Claim, and on this land a small group of multi-purpose buildings sprang up. The sisters named their new home Providence of the Holy Angels. Over the next few years, it housed the convent, novitiate, and infirmary, an orphanage for both boys and girls, a boarding and day school, rooms for the elderly and insane and the first St. Joseph Hospital. The sisters also cared for the clergy of St. James Cathedral, as well as visiting the poor and sick in their homes.

The diocese became involved in a long dispute over ownership of the St. James Mission Claim, so it was not to become the sSisters' permanent mission site. Instead, Mother Joseph purchased property away from the disputed area and protected the Sisters' interests through incorporation as the Sisters of Charity of the House of Providence in the Territory of Washington on 28 January 1859. It remains one of Washington State's oldest corporations and the parent corporation for Providence Health & Services.

In the early 1870s, Mother Joseph began planning a permanent home for Providence of the Holy Angels on the property she had purchased earlier in Vancouver. She designed and supervised construction of Providence Academy, bounded by Tenth and Twelfth, "C" and Reserve Streets. The local Hidden Brick Company supplied the bricks for the four-story structure. The sisters and their orphans and boarders moved into the Academy on 7 September 1874, before the interior was finished. Mother Joseph supervised construction of a large addition in 1891, but otherwise the exterior of the building remains much as it was built. A stickler for detail, Mother Joseph often inspected foundations, rafters and bounced on planks to ensure their support.

As architect and artist, she was responsible for designing some of the buildings and supervising their construction. She undertook aggressive fundraising tours, braving the mountains and wilderness on horseback. Each of her "begging tours" into mining camps lasted several months and raised between $2,000 and $5,000 toward the realization of her goal. A brief timeline of what buildings Mother Joseph was involved in building; 1856 Providence Academy, Vancouver, Wash. 1858 St. Joseph Hospital, Vancouver. 1863 Providence St. Joseph (school), Steilacoom, Wash. 1864 St. Vincent Academy Walla Walla, Wash. (“Mother Joseph of the Sacred Heart, Sister of Providence.” The First American Women Architects, by Sarah Allaback, University of Illinois Press, 2008, pp. 153–156.)

The tours were not without danger from highwaymen either. She almost lost all of her proceeds from a recent tour in 1866 when she and her stage stopped suddenly by armed men and robbed at gunpoint. She reported to have put up a convincing ruse, telling the highwayman, "There is nothing in there that you would want." The tours took her far from Vancouver even unto the interior of Idaho and Montana, being plump with money from the many mines located there. Later her compatriots from Ohio would establish Indian Mission Schools in Montana. Mother Joseph effectively supported their multiple institutions while her superiors in Montreal did not have an abundance of resources to support them, a testament to her tenacity and dedication to the service of others.

Mother Joseph died of a brain tumor on 19 January 1902, at Providence Academy in Vancouver, Washington and is buried in nearby Mother Joseph Cemetery. While she left a legacy of humanitarian service, it is not true (as has been widely reported) that the American Institute of Architects declared Mother Joseph "The First Architect of the Pacific Northwest." However, she did plan and build some of the region's first permanent institutions of learning and medical care.

== Homage ==
In 1980, the state of Washington recognized her many talents and contributions by naming her as one of the state's two representatives to the U.S. Capitol's National Statuary Hall Collection. A bronze statue of Mother Joseph, created by Felix W. de Weldon, was given to the collection of the Statuary Hall in the U.S. Capitol. The campaign to add Mother Joseph to the US Statuary hall met great opposition in 1977 and almost stopped. However, February 4, 1977, saw the first hearing of the proposed statue at Washington D.C. House Bill No. 574 successfully passed along with the Senate version of the bill Senate Bill No. 2431. Ultimately, Felix de Weldon received the commission by the Mother Joseph Foundation to create the statue. Many who viewed the statue thought it should have included hammer and nails instead of praying hands. The statue successfully reveals her desire and piousness to serve those in need.

Additionally, the State of Washington celebrates her birthday as an official state holiday. Governor Gary Locke signed SB 5734 into law on April 16, 1999. SB 5734 also established September 4 as Marcus Whitman Day.

She was also inducted into the National Cowgirl Hall of Fame.

== Legacy ==
Mother Joseph was responsible for the completion of eleven hospitals, seven academies, five schools for Native American children, and two orphanages throughout an area that now encompasses Washington, northern Oregon, Idaho, and Montana. Today the Province of Mother Joseph, which covers the Sisters of Providence of that region, honors her faith and pioneering spirit.

Providence Academy continued in operation until 1966, when, with enrollment and the number of teaching sisters declining and the school in need of remodeling, the sisters decided to close the academy and to sell their property in Vancouver. The building lay vacant for several years before it was purchased in 1969 by Robert Hidden, grandson of Lowell Hidden, founder of Hidden Brick Company, which had supplied the bricks for its construction. The facility operates as offices, shops, restaurant, a Montessori school and a wedding chapel. The building is on the National Register of Historic Places. The Hidden Family sold the property to the Vancouver National Historic Reserve Trust in January 2015. The Trust will continue its current use while restoring the site. In 2018, the Historic Trust announced plans to develop a low-modernist mixed-use development on the Providence Academy site, next to the historical building. This plan has been met with controversy.

== See also ==
- Women in architecture
- Carla, Blank; Tania Martin (2014). Storming the old boys' citadel : two pioneer women architects of nineteenth century North America. Montreal: Baraka Books. ISBN 9781771860321. OCLC 899568373.
- McCrosson, Mary of the Blessed Sacrament (1957). The Bell and the River. Palo Alto, California: Pacific Books.
