= Felix de Weldon =

Austrian-American sculptor (1907–2003)

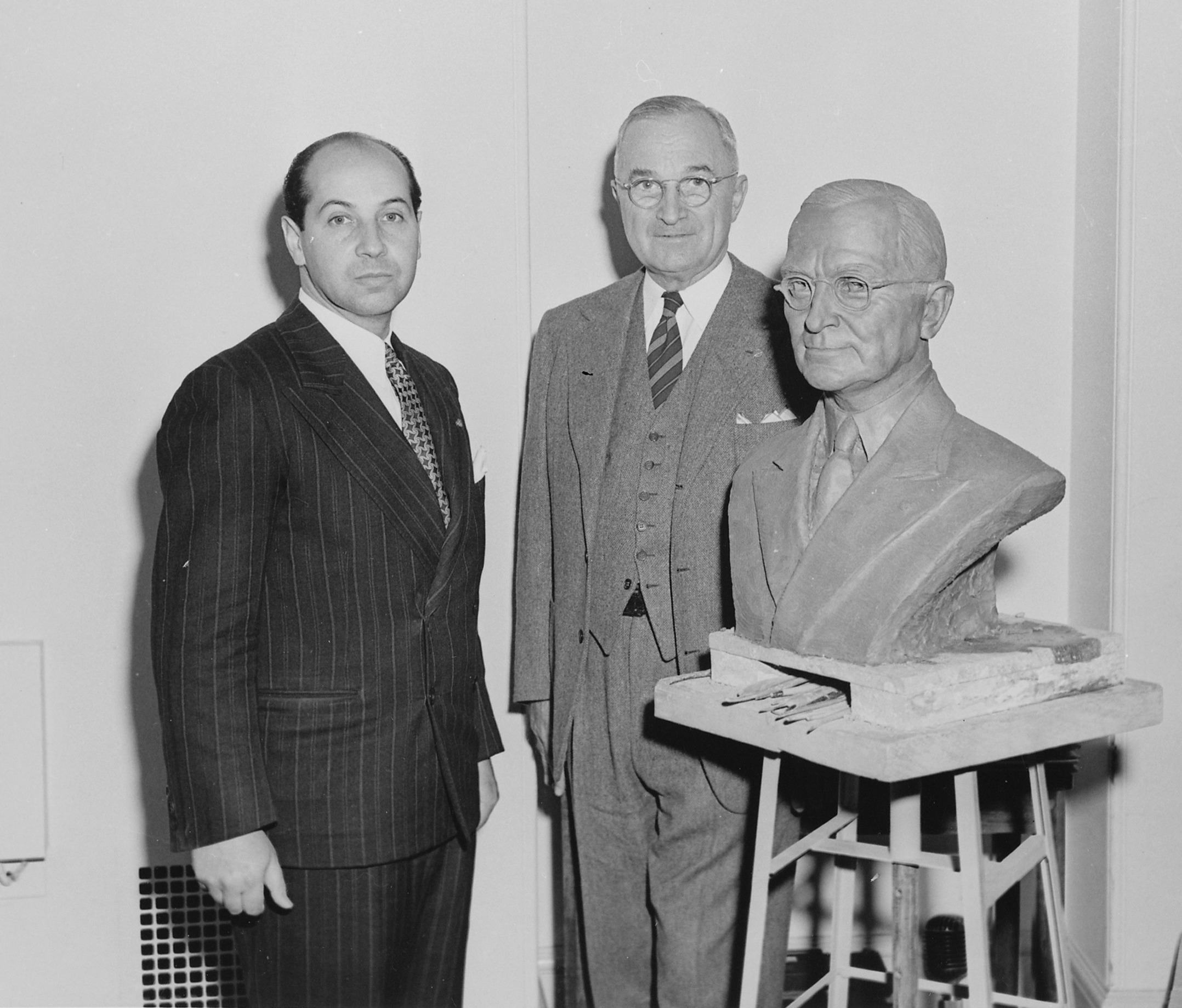
- De Weldon with President Harry S. Truman in 1949
- Born: Felix Weihs de Weldon; April 12, 1907; Vienna, Austria-Hungary
- Died: June 3, 2003 (aged 96); Washington, D.C., U.S.
- Resting place: Arlington National Cemetery
- Education: Marchetti College (AB); University of Vienna (MA, MS, PhD)
- Occupation: Sculptor
- Children: 2

Felix Weihs de Weldon (April 12, 1907 – June 3, 2003) was an Austrian-American sculptor. His most famous pieces include the United States Marine Corps War Memorial (Iwo Jima Memorial, 1954) in the Arlington National Cemetery, Virginia, US, and the Malaysian National Monument (1966) in Kuala Lumpur.

== Biography ==
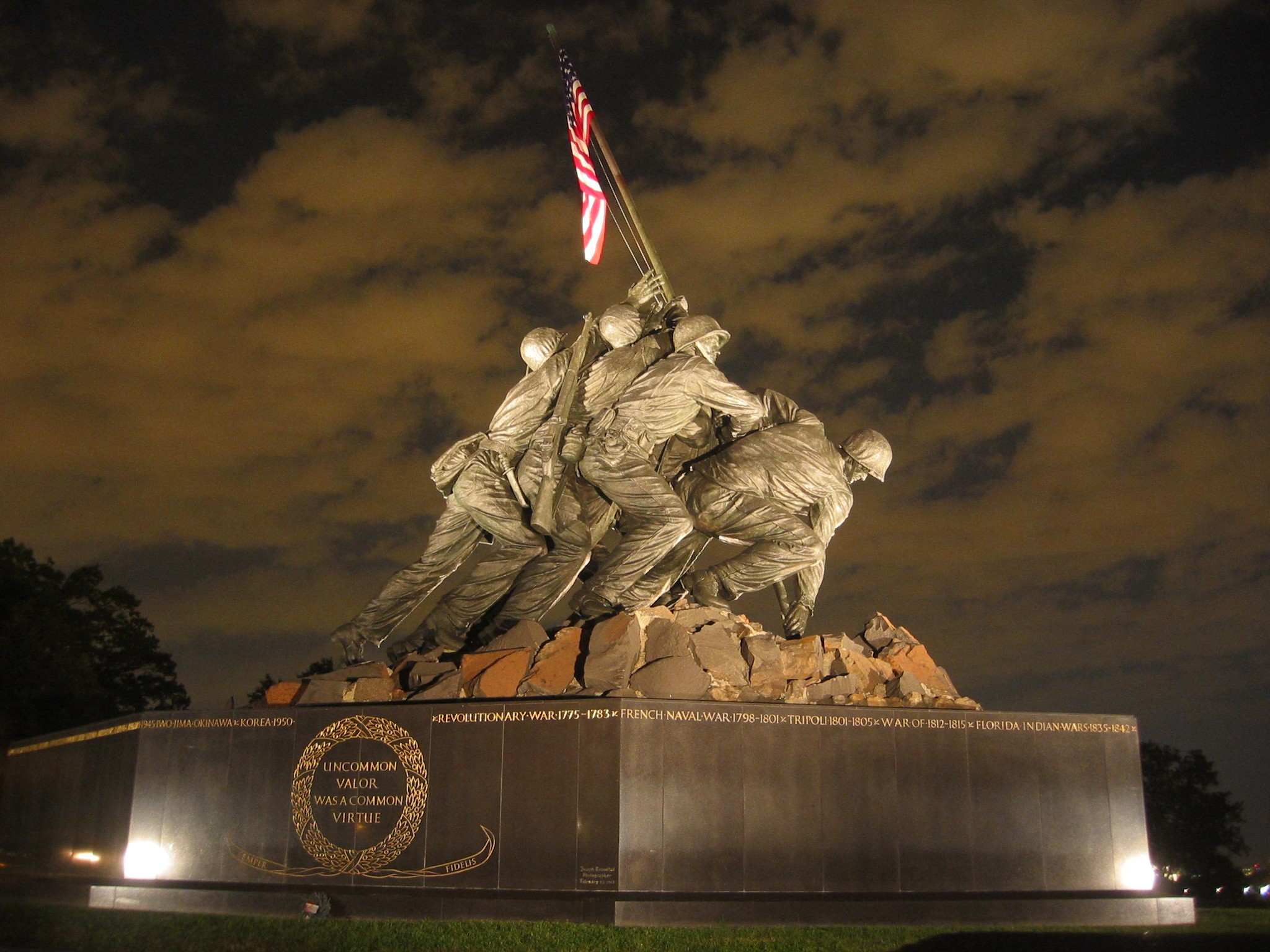
U.S. Marine Corps War Memorial at night

Felix de Weldon was born in Vienna, Austria-Hungary, on April 12, 1907. He received his early education at St. Egichin's Grammar School. In 1925, he earned an AB from Marchetti College, a preparatory college. From the University of Vienna's Academy of Creative Arts and School of Architecture, he earned his M.A. and M.S. degrees in 1927 and his PhD in 1929.

De Weldon first received notice as a sculptor at the age of 17, with his statue of Austrian educator and diplomat Professor Ludo Hartman. In the 1920s, he joined artist's communes in France, Italy and Spain. De Weldon eventually moved to London, where he gained a number of commissions, among them a portrait sculpture of George V.

A consequential trip to Canada to sculpt Prime Minister Mackenzie King brought De Weldon to North America. He settled in the United States in 1937. De Weldon enlisted in the United States Navy during World War II and was discharged with the rank of Painter Second Class (PTR 2). He became a United States citizen in 1945.

In 1950, President Harry Truman appointed de Weldon to the U.S. Commission of Fine Arts. In 1956, he was re-appointed by President Dwight Eisenhower, and again in 1961 by President John F. Kennedy. In 1959, he received an honorary knighthood for his service to the British Crown.

In 1951, De Weldon acquired the historic Beacon Rock estate in Newport, Rhode Island, where he lived until 1996 when he lost the property and most of his assets to financial hardship.

De Weldon was a long time Member of the Arts Club of Washington.

Felix de Weldon died on June 3, 2003, at the age of 96, in Washington, D.C., and was buried in Arlington National Cemetery. de Weldon was survived by two sons, including actor Daniel de Weldon. Daniel is collaborating with Barry Krost Management on a biopic of his father's life.

== Work ==
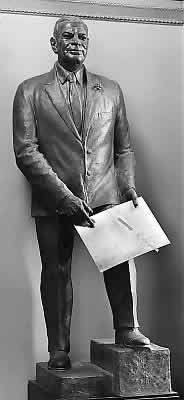
Bronze of Senator Bob Bartlett in the National Statuary Hall

Approximately 1,200 de Weldon sculptures are located in seven countries. (A de Weldon monument of Richard Byrd is on McMurdo Sound, in Antarctica).

At the conclusion of the war in 1945, the Congress of the United States commissioned de Weldon to construct the statue for the Marine Corps War Memorial (called Iwo Jima Memorial) in the realist tradition, based upon the famous photograph of Joe Rosenthal, of the Associated Press agency, taken on February 23, 1945. De Weldon made sculptures from life of three (on June 23, 2016, John Bradley was not believed to be in the photo) of the six servicemen raising the replacement United States flag on Mount Suribachi, on Iwo Jima. The other three flag-raisers who were killed in action (on June 23, 2016, Harold Schultz was identified as a flag-raiser in the photo and was not KIA) later on the island were sculpted from photographs. De Weldon took nine years to make the memorial which was dedicated on November 10, 1954, and was assisted by hundreds of other sculptors. The result is the 100-ton bronze statue which is on display in Arlington, Virginia.

De Weldon also contributed in creating Malaysia's Tugu Negara (National Monument) when the country's first Prime Minister, Tunku Abdul Rahman saw the Marine Corps War Memorial statue in his visit to America in October 1960 and personally met him for favour to design the monument. De Weldon was later conferred with the title Tan Sri, the Malaysian equivalent of a high-ranking knighthood.

== Images ==
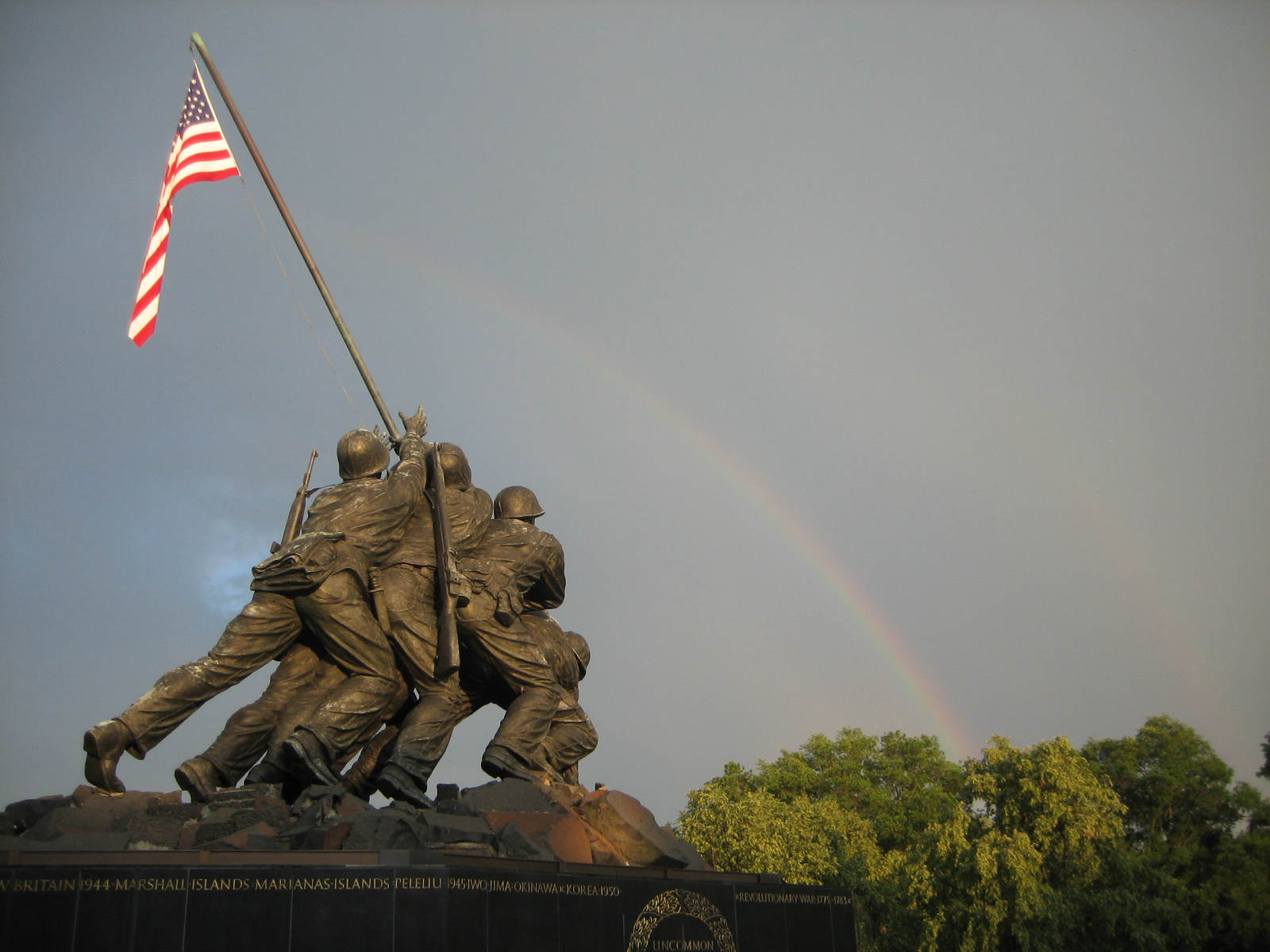
Iwo Jima Memorial - Arlington, Virginia

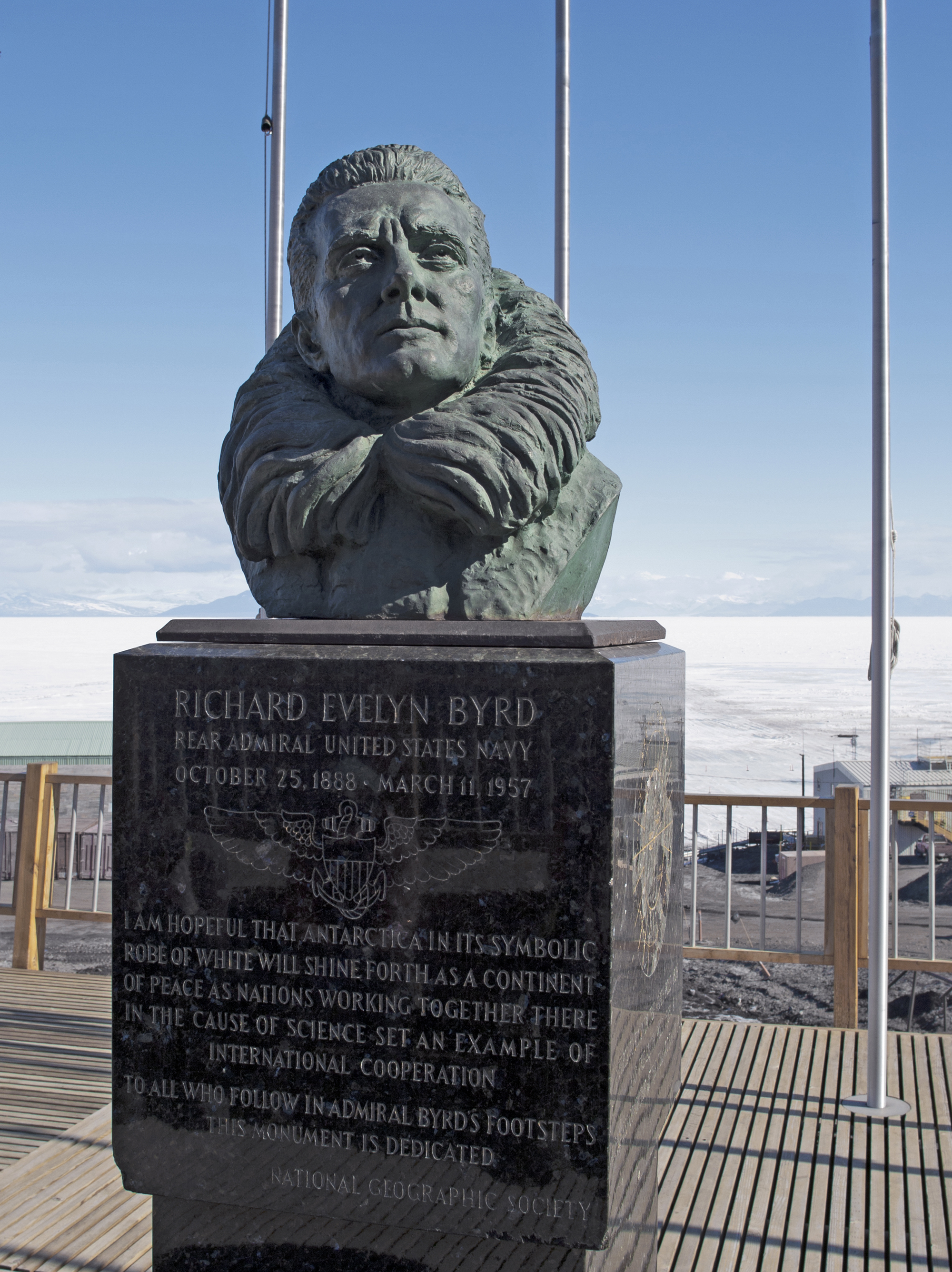
Richard Evelyn Byrd memorial, McMurdo Station. (Copy of same in Arlington Cemetery)

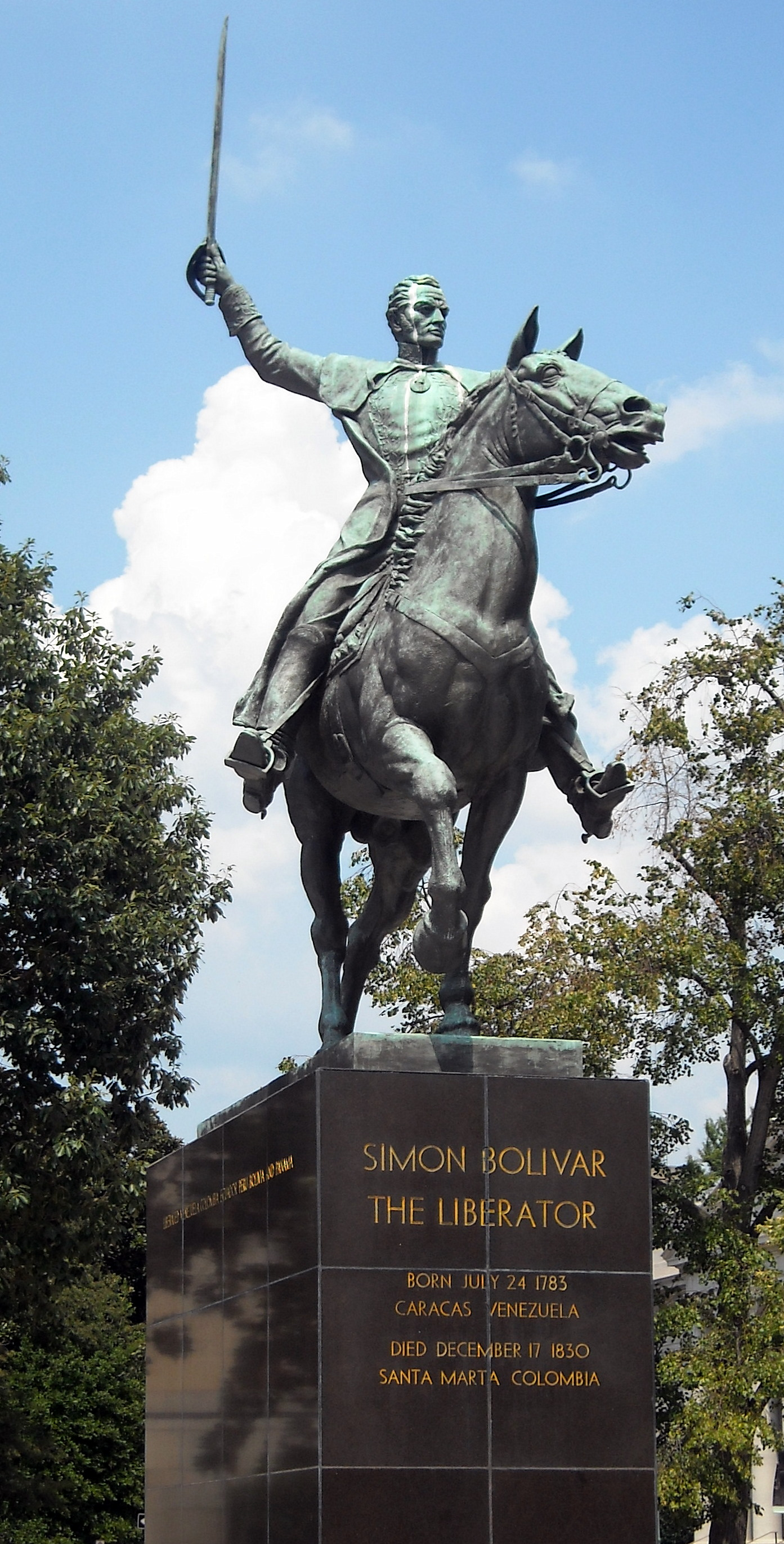
Simon Bolivar equestrian statue, Washington, DC

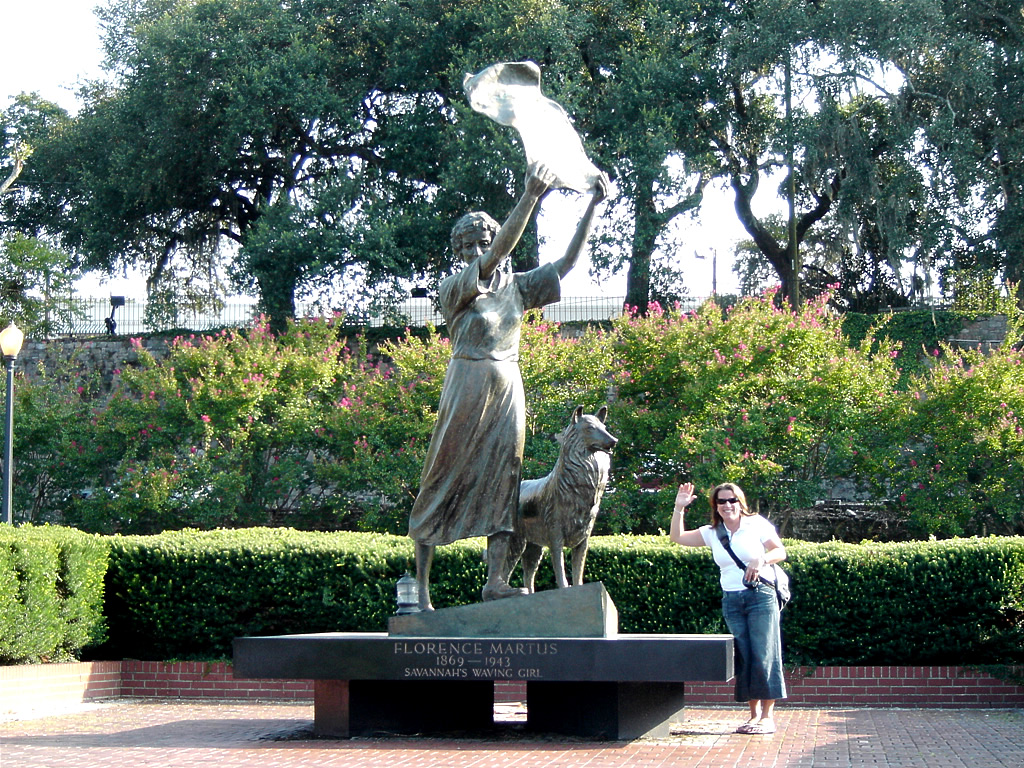
Florence Martus memorial, Savannah, GA.

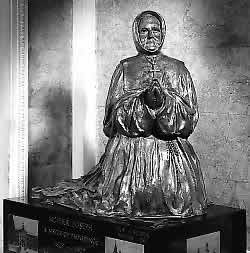
Mother Joseph statue, Statuary Hall, Washington, DC

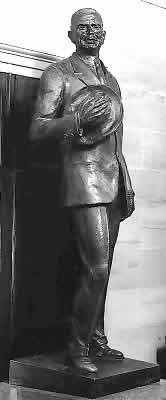
Dennis Chavez statue, Statuary Hall, Washington, DC

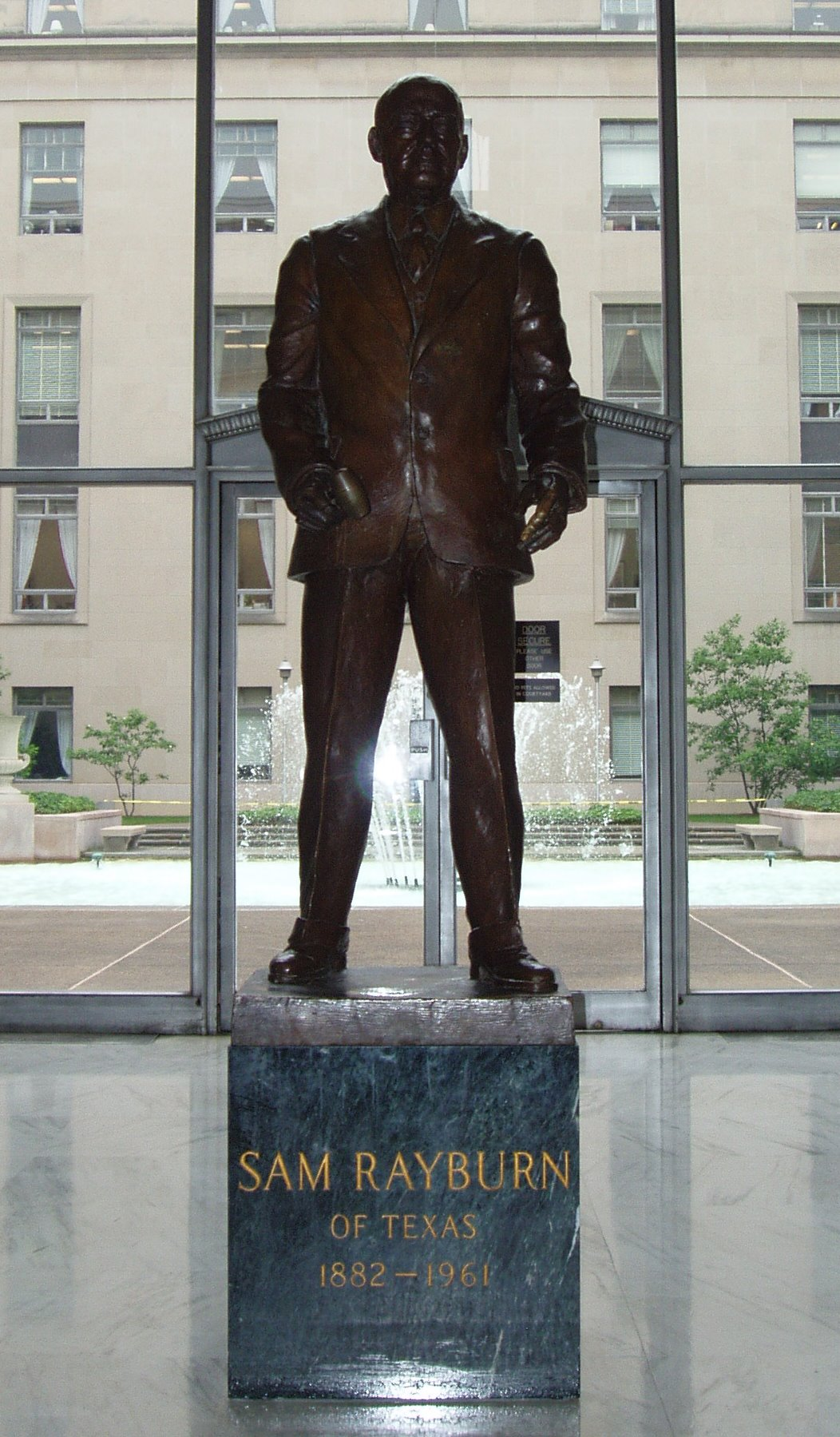
Sam Rayburn Statue, Rayburn Office Building, Washington DC.

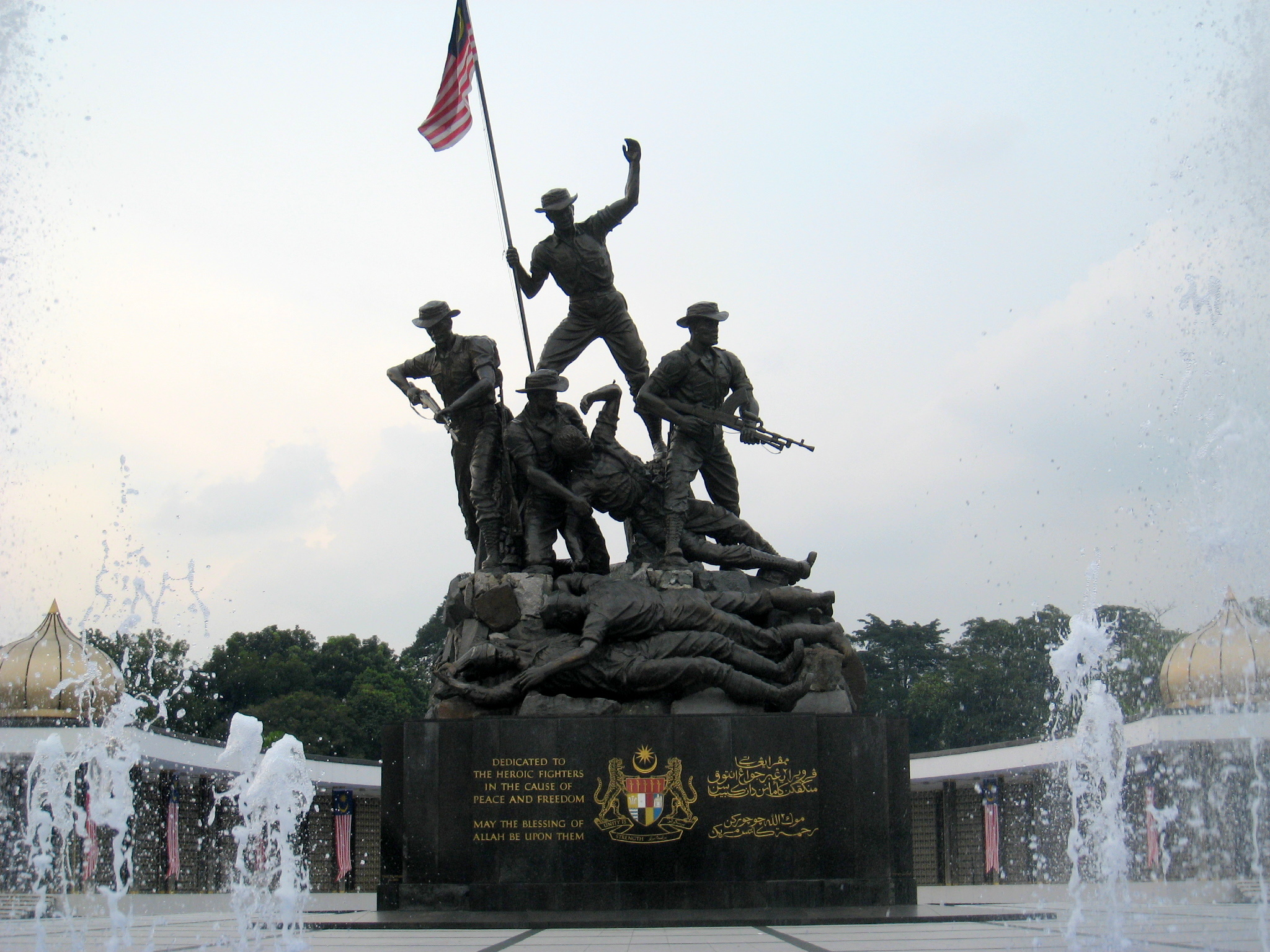
The Tugu Negara (National Monument), Kuala Lumpur, Malaysia

Tunku Abdul Rahman statue, Parliament of Malaysia, Kuala Lumpur, Malaysia

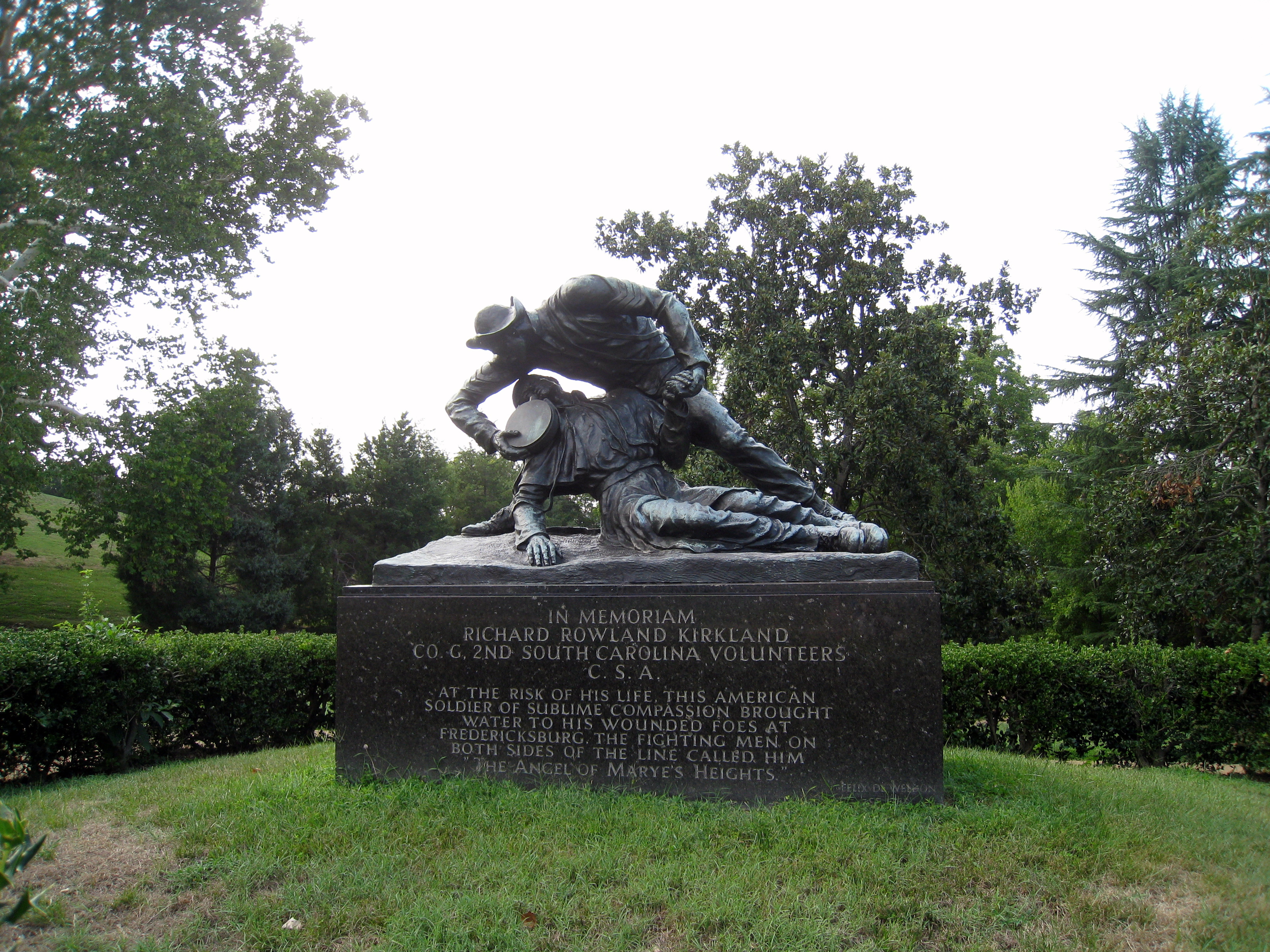
Kirkland Monument, Fredericksburg, Virginia

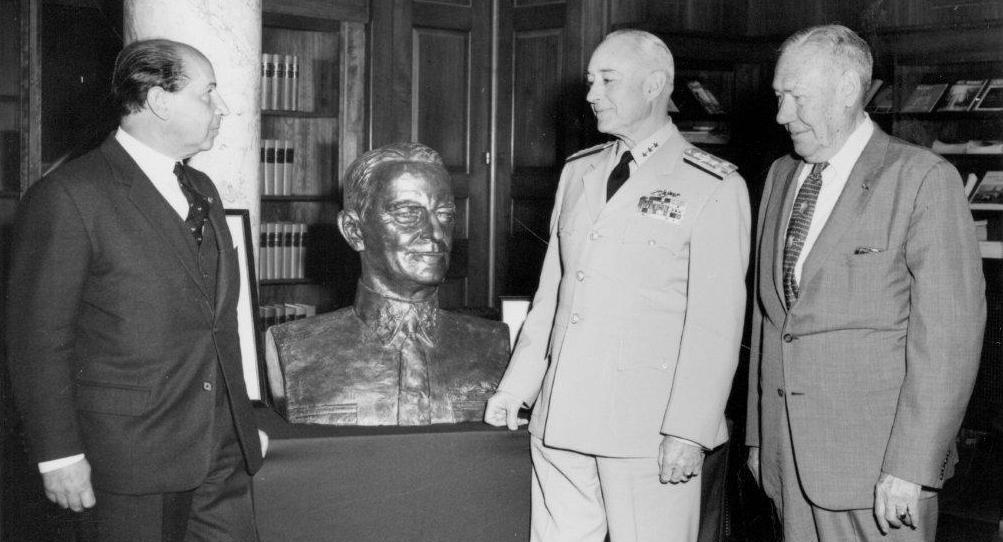
De Weldon (left) presents his bust of U.S. Navy Admiral of the Fleet Chester W. Nimitz to the Naval War College on 5 June 1964. President of the Naval War College Vice Admiral Bernard L. Austin (center) and retired U.S. Marine Corps Lieutenant General Keller E. Rockey look on.

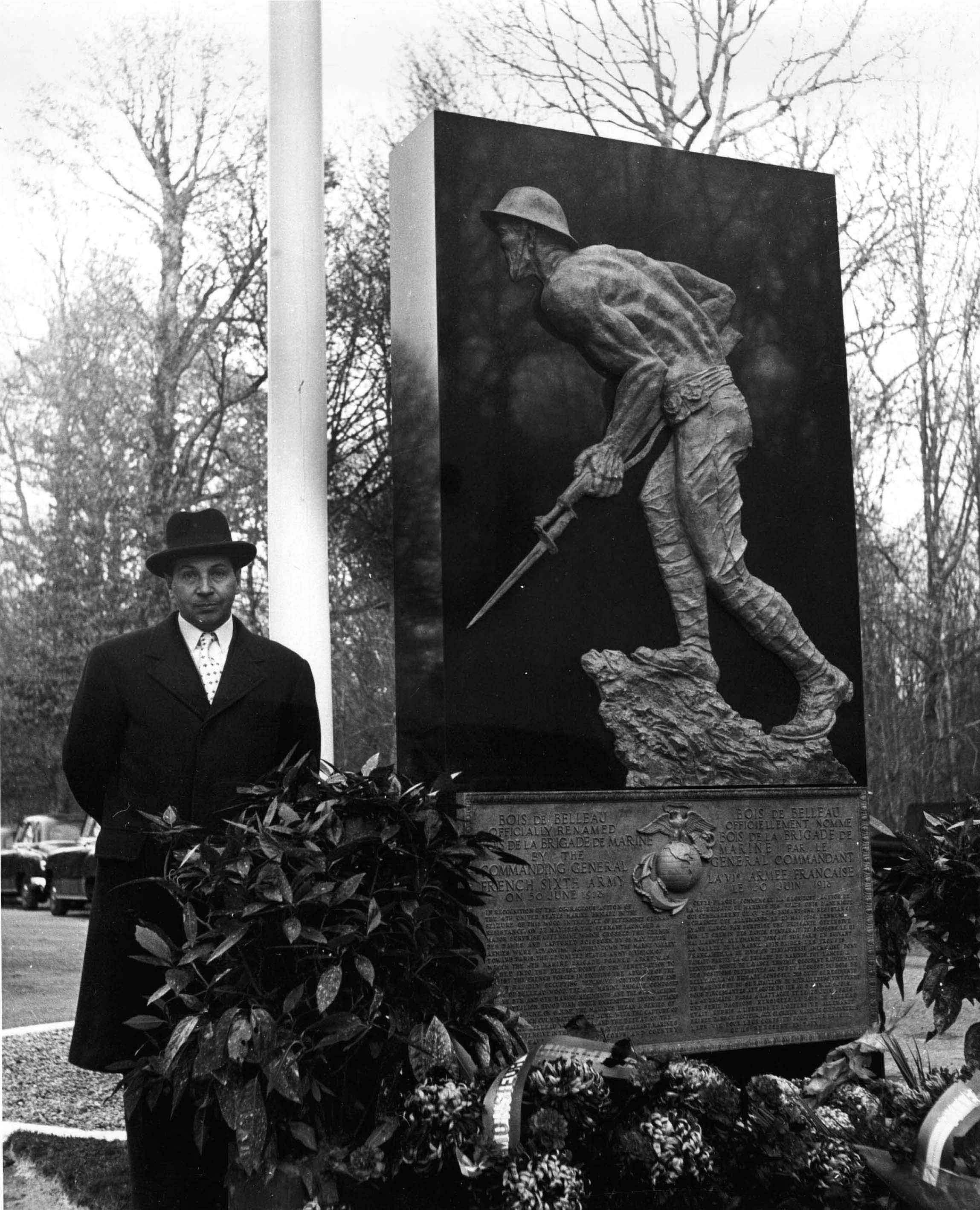
Felix de Weldon at the Marine Memorial dedication at Belleau Wood.

== Partial list of public sculpture ==
- 1935 – King George V, National Portrait Gallery, London, UK
- 1936 – King Edward VIII coronation bust, London, UK
- 1936 – King George VI coronation bust, London, UK
- 1938 – Prime Minister Mackenzie King – Parliament Hill, Ottawa, Canada
- 1938 – Agnes Campbell Macphail – Parliament Hill, Ottawa, Canada
- 1938 – Senator Cairine Wilson – Parliament Hill, Ottawa, Canada
- 1944 - [life-size crucifix] St. Nicholas Chapel, Naval Air Station Patuxent River, Maryland
- 1945 – George Washington, United States Embassy, Canberra, Australia
- 1948 – Simon Bolivar Monument, Bolivar, West Virginia
- 1948 – President Harry S. Truman bust – Truman Library, Independence, Missouri
- 1949 – George Bannerman Dealey statue, Dealey Plaza, Dallas, Texas
- 1949 – Fleet Admiral Chester W. Nimitz, U.S. Naval Academy, Annapolis, Maryland
- 1949 – Secretary of the United States Senate Leslie Biffle, Main Post Office, Piggott, Arkansas
- 1949 – John Steelman, University of Arkansas, Fayetteville, Arkansas
- 1954 – Raising of the Flag on Mount Suribachi, Iwo Jima Memorial, Rosslyn, Virginia (original model 1946)
- 1954 – John Marshall bust, College of William and Mary, Williamsburg, Virginia
- 1954 – Sir William Blackstone bust, College of William and Mary, Williamsburg, Virginia
- 1954 – George Wythe bust, College of William and Mary, Williamsburg, Virginia
- 1955 – Marine Monument ("Iron Mike"), Aisne-Marne American Cemetery and Memorial, Belleau Wood, France
- 1959 – Equestrian Statue of Simon Bolivar, Washington, DC
- 1959 – American Red Cross Memorial, American Red Cross Headquarters, Washington, DC
- 1961 – Simon Bolivar Monument, Bedford Square, Baltimore, Maryland
- 1961 – Rear Admiral Richard Evelyn Byrd, Arlington National Cemetery, Arlington, Virginia
- 1961 – Rear Admiral Richard Evelyn Byrd, McMurdo Station, Antarctica
- 1961 – St. Stephen the Martyr, Church of St. Stephen Martyr, Washington, DC
- 1963 – President John F. Kennedy, John F. Kennedy Library, Boston, Massachusetts
- 1963 – Harry S. Truman Monument, Athens, Greece
- 1964 – Sam Rayburn, Speaker of the House, Rayburn House Office Building, Washington, DC
- 1964 – Patrick Cudahy Memorial, Cudahy, Wisconsin
- 1965 – Minute Man Statue – National Guard Monument, Washington, DC
- 1965 – Richard Rowland Kirkland Monument, Fredericksburg and Spotsylvania National Military Park, Fredericksburg, Virginia
- 1966 – Walter Reed Sculpture, Walter Reed Army Medical Center, Washington, DC
- 1966 – Abraham Lincoln statue, Chapultepec Park, Mexico City
- 1966 – National Monument for Malaysia, Kuala Lumpur, Malaysia
- 1968 – Sam Rayburn, Speaker of the House, LBJ Library, Austin, Texas
- 1968 – Sergeant York, Tennessee State Capitol, Nashville, Tennessee
- 1971 – Prime Minister Tunku Abdul Rahman, Parliament of Malaysia, Kuala Lumpur, Malaysia
- 1971 – Senator Bob Bartlett, Statuary Hall, U.S. Capitol, Washington, DC
- 1972 – Senator Dennis Chavez, Statuary Hall, U.S. Capitol, Washington, DC
- 1973 – General George Rogers Clark, Louisville, Kentucky
- 1973 – Seabees Memorial, Arlington National Cemetery, Washington, DC
- 1973 – Benjamin Franklin, Louisville Public Library, Louisville, Kentucky
- 1974 – Centennial Statue ("Astronaut Statue"), Eastern Kentucky University, Richmond, Kentucky
- 1974 – Florence Martus statue ("Waving Girl"), Morrell Park, Savannah, Georgia
- 1976 – Torch of Freedom, Veterans of Foreign Wars Headquarters, Washington, DC
- 1976 – Admiral Ben Moreell "Father of the Seabees", Naval Base Ventura County
- 1976 – Archbishop John Carroll (bishop), Prince George's County Court House, Upper Marlboro, Maryland
- 1977 – Statue of Ty Cobb, Royston Public Library, Royston, Georgia
- 1980 – Mother Joseph, Statuary Hall, U.S. Capitol, Washington, DC
- 1981 – Mother Joseph Statue, City Hall, Vancouver, Washington
- 1982 – General Lemuel C. Shepherd, Jr., USMC, Virginia Military Institute, Lexington, Virginia
- 1985 – William G. Leftwich, Jr., Lieutenant Colonel, USMC, Quantico, Virginia
- 1990 – President James Monroe statue, Fredericksburg, Virginia
- 1990 – Anchors Aweigh Sculpture, Intrepid Sea-Air-Space Museum, New York, New York
- 1995 – Elvis Presley statue, Graceland, Memphis, Tennessee
