= Bud Clark (politician) =

American politician and businessman (1931–2022)

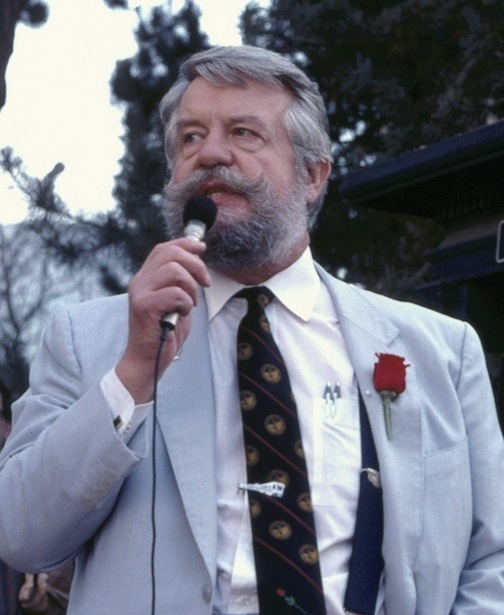
- Clark in 1988

48th Mayor of Portland
- In office January 3, 1985 – December 31, 1992
- Preceded by: Frank Ivancie
- Succeeded by: Vera Katz

Personal details
- Born: John Elwood Clark Jr. December 19, 1931 Nampa, Idaho, U.S.
- Died: February 1, 2022 (aged 90) Portland, Oregon, U.S.
- Party: Democratic
- Spouse: Sigrid Fehrenbacher (m. 1964; died 2000)
- Children: 3
- Profession: Restaurateur, politician
- Military career
- Allegiance: United States
- Branch: United States Marine Corps
- Service years: 1950–1954
- Conflicts: Korean War

John Elwood "Bud" Clark Jr. (December 19, 1931 – February 1, 2022) was an American businessman and politician who served as the 48th mayor of Portland, Oregon, from 1985 to 1992. A left-leaning populist with little political experience before his mayoral bid, he was one of Portland's most colorful political figures.

== Early life ==
Clark was born in Nampa, Idaho, on December 19, 1931. His family moved to La Grande, Oregon, and then to Portland when he was 6 years old. He graduated from Lincoln High School in 1949 and attended college at Vanport College for a year (now Portland State University) and Oregon State University for a quarter, before enlisting in the Marines. He volunteered for combat in Korea three times but was denied and remained at Camp Pendleton for his entire tenure. After the Marines, he attended college at Vanport College (now Portland State University), Oregon State University, and Reed College where he dropped out in his junior year. In 1967, he opened the Goose Hollow Inn tavern in the Goose Hollow neighborhood of Portland. At that time, the neighborhood name was falling into disuse and Clark is now credited with keeping the Goose Hollow neighborhood identity alive.

Clark was the raincoat-wearing model for a 1978 poster titled "Expose Yourself to Art", photographed by his friend Mike Ryerson, in which he appeared to expose himself to a nude female public statue, Kvinneakt, in downtown Portland.

== Mayor of Portland ==
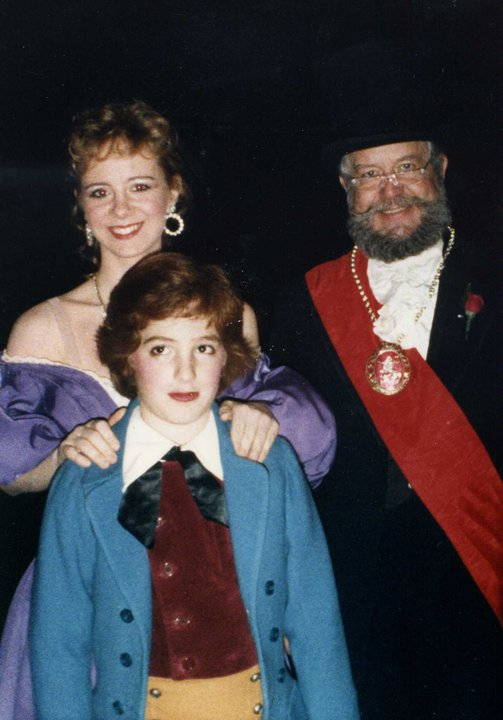
Bud Clark (right) after a performance of The Nutcracker with Oregon Ballet Theatre at Keller Auditorium, 1985.

In 1984, Clark ran for mayor when no other candidate would come forward to challenge Frank Ivancie. He won in the primary, on May 15, 1984, with 54.7% of the vote. Under Portland's rules for municipal elections, Clark's winning more than 50 percent of the vote in the primary meant that there would be no runoff election in the fall, and his name was the only name on the ballot in the November general election. In view of this, he was already being referred to as "mayor-elect" well before November, but was "officially" elected mayor on November 6, 1984. His term began on January 2, 1985. As mayor, he was recognized for his eccentricities. He commuted to work by bicycle, and was known for his distinctive cry of "Whoop, Whoop!" His distinctive style led to an appearance on The Tonight Show with Johnny Carson in October 1984.

In office, Clark found that Ivancie had reduced the city's reserves and budget. As mayor, Clark created the nationally recognized 12-Point Homeless Plan, supported the growth of mass transit, including the MAX Light Rail line to Gresham, Oregon, aided downtown development, and initiated and led the campaign to build the Oregon Convention Center.

Clark sanctioned The Mayor's Ball, an annual charity event featuring independent musicians from all over the Pacific Northwest. The Mayor's Ball ended after the election of Vera Katz. A spokesperson for then-Mayor Tom Potter, said that the event cost Clark's office $45,000 and also admitted that it also pulled in nearly $80,000.

Mayor Clark with Commissioner (city council member) Margaret Strachan in 1986

Clark was re-elected in 1988 after defeating 11 candidates in the primary and beating former Chief of Police Ron Still in the general.

Due to $71,650 in campaign debt (mostly to U.S. Bank with a $52,000 lien against his personal home) from his 1988 campaign, Clark needed to raise money in 1991. A $100-per-plate fundraising event ended up significantly undersold, and the "Oregon Political Party" fundraiser in the South Park Blocks actually lost money.

Clark retired from politics and resumed his career as a tavern owner. In 2011, he wrote the foreword to Portland's Goose Hollow, a book about the neighborhood's history.

== Personal life and death ==
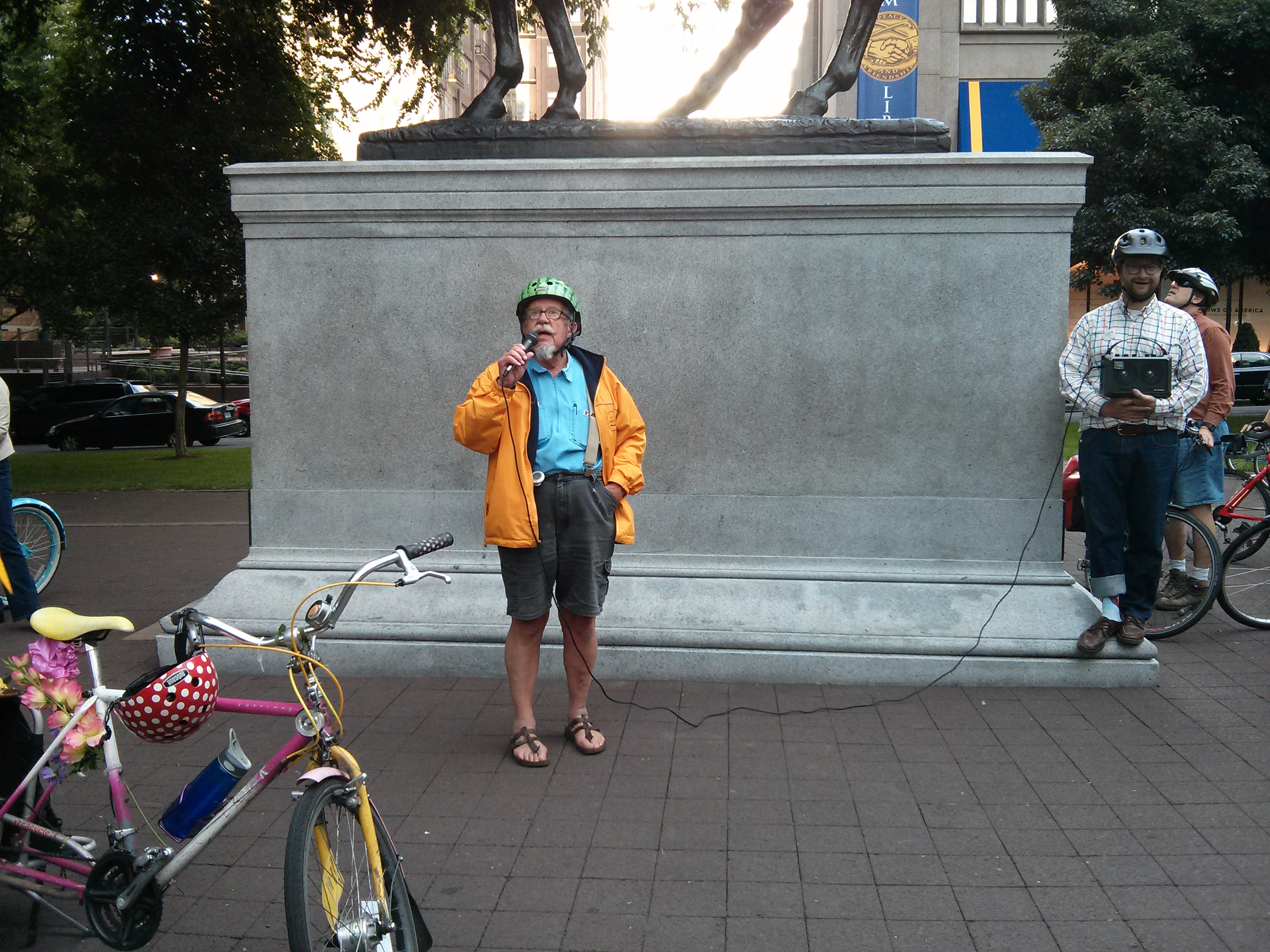
Clark speaking in front of the Theodore Roosevelt, Rough Rider equestrian statue in 2013

Clark married Sigrid Fehrenbacher in 1964 and they had three children. Fehrenbacher died in 2000.

Clark had a namesake in the Bud Clark Commons, "apartments for people experiencing chronic homelessness" located in Old Town and completed in 2011.

Clark died from congestive heart failure on February 1, 2022, in Portland, at the age of 90. He was interred at River View Cemetery, in a natural burial.

== See also ==
- List of Reed College people

Preceded by Frank Ivancie	Mayor of Portland, Oregon; 1985–1993	Succeeded by Vera Katz
