= Expose Yourself to Art =

Poster of a man flashing a sculpture

The poster

"Expose Yourself to Art" was the name of a poster which featured Bud Clark, future mayor of Portland, Oregon, seen flashing a bronze nude sculpture. The poster, and Clark himself—at the time a bar owner in Goose Hollow—became widely known.

== Poster ==
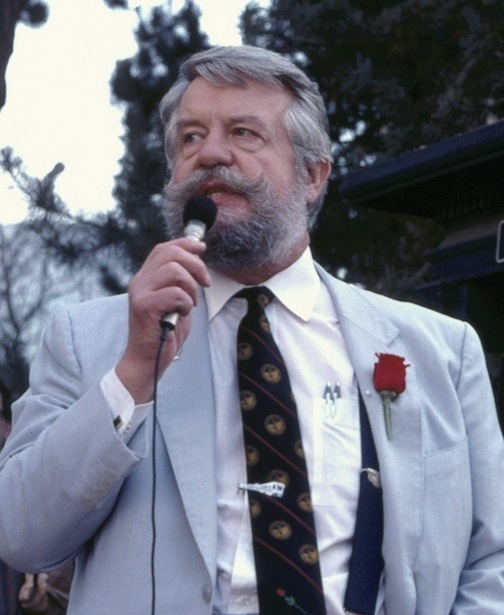
Bud Clark, who later became mayor of Portland, Oregon, was pictured in the poster flashing Kvinneakt.

The "Expose Yourself to Art" poster showed Bud Clark apparently flashing an artwork, titled Kvinneakt, Norman J. Taylor's bronze sculpture of a nude woman. Clark appeared to be wearing only a raincoat, but it was later revealed that he was wearing shorts and a T-shirt under his raincoat.

The photo was taken by Mike Ryerson in 1978, then a staff member of The Northwest Neighbor. Ryerson and Clark originally intended to create a poster for the Venereal Disease Action Council until a reader submitted the caption "expose yourself to art". With $500 (equivalent to $2,500 in 2025), Ryerson printed 800 posters, which he sold for one dollar each (equivalent to $4.94 in 2025) from a booth at Waterfront Park. By 1984, the year Clark was elected mayor, Ryerson had sold more than 250,000 posters, with profits supporting The Northwest Neighbor.

Ryerson later sold rights to the poster to Mike Beard, owner of Errol Graphics. In 2010, Clark sold the coat he wore in the poster, among other household items, by secret bid. It was announced at Clark's memorial service on May 15, 2022 that Thomas Lauderdale, of Pink Martini, was the owner of the coat and that he was donating it to a new permanent exhibit of Portland History at the Oregon Historical Society museum. Lauderdale displayed the coat ceremoniously on stage.

=== Reaction ===
Prior to Clark's later bid for the office of mayor, he was chiefly known outside of his neighborhood of Goose Hollow for his appearance on the controversial poster. In 1984, six years after the poster's publication, Clark, running as a political outsider, began a long-shot campaign for Portland mayor against incumbent Frank Ivancie. Ivancie cited Clark's appearance on the poster as proof that he was not a serious candidate, and that his only claim to fame was "exposing himself to a downtown statue." Clark handily defeated Ivancie and served two terms as mayor. Following the election, Clark sold autographed copies of the poster to eliminate his campaign debt.

The poster has been referred to historically as being part of an arts advocacy campaign. As of 2013, the image's photographer, Mike Ryerson, had retired from the Northwest Examiner (successor paper to The Northwest Neighbor), and became noted as an oral historian who led walking tours of Northwest Portland in the neighborhoods where he and Clark documented, lived, and worked for most of their lives. Ryerson died on January 6, 2015.

== Legacy ==
The slogan and poster have been parodied on several occasions. In 2011, Willamette Week published the article "Expose Yourself to Bikes", which included a cover image of a woman wearing an orange coat "flashing" a bike. Clark owned a sweatshirt that read "Expose yourself to retirement".

In 2015, Portland Mayor Charlie Hales declared May 7, 2015 as "Expose Yourself to Art Day."

== See also ==
- Culture of Portland, Oregon
- Depictions of nudity
- Regional Arts & Culture Council, the agency that oversees arts activity in the Portland metropolitan area and administers Kvinneakt
