= Cat in Repose =

Sculpture in Portland, Oregon, U.S.

Coordinates: 45°31′09.1″N 122°40′38.27″W

- The sculpture in front of MAX Light Rail tracks in 2009
- Artist: Kathleen McCullough
- Year: 1977
- Type: Stone sculpture
- Medium: Indiana Limestone
- Location: Portland, Oregon, U.S.
- Owner: City of Portland and Multnomah County Public Art Collection courtesy of the Regional Arts & Culture Council

Cat in Repose, also known as Seated Cat, is a stone sculpture composed of Indiana Limestone, located on the Transit Mall of downtown Portland, Oregon, United States. Designed and created by Kathleen McCullough in 1977, the sculpture is currently installed near the intersection of Southwest Fifth Avenue and Southwest Morrison Street. Cat in Repose is part of the City of Portland and Multnomah County Public Art Collection courtesy of the Regional Arts & Culture Council.

== Description ==
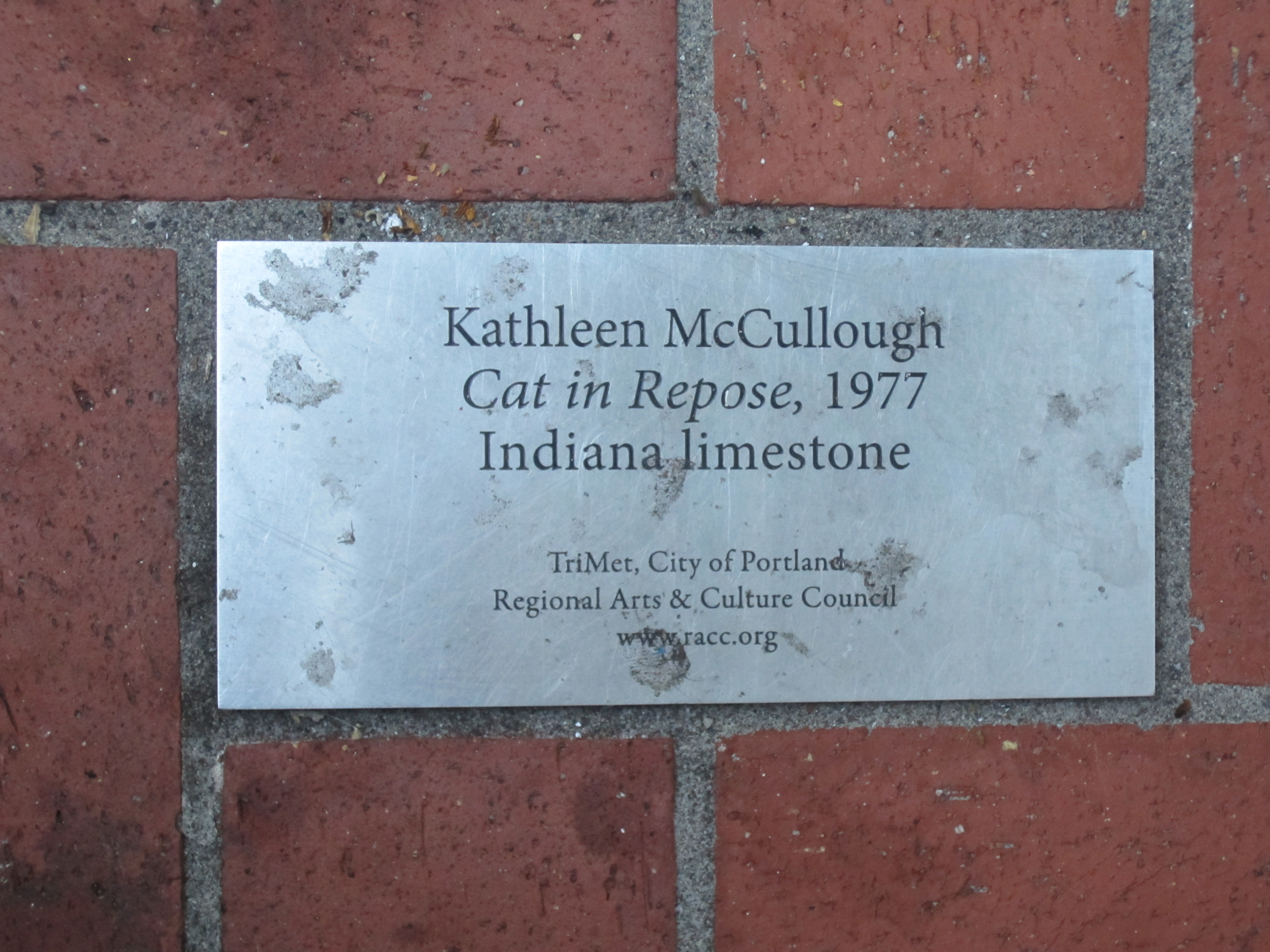
The sculpture's plaque

Cat in Repose is a stone sculpture composed of Indiana Limestone, created by Kathleen McCullough in 1977. McCullough also sculpted Limestone Lion (1983), a similar stone work donated by CitiCorp to the Lincoln Park Zoo in memory of A. Rush Watkins, the Chicago businessman who helped establish the Lincoln Park Zoological Society and later served as its president. Both works, depicting reclining felines, are considered interactive art for providing surfaces on which to lean or climb.

The sculpture measures 36 by 53 inches (0.91 m × 1.35 m). According to the Regional Arts & Culture Council, the sculpture is "one of the most celebrated sculptures along the Portland Transit Mall and is especially dear to children".

== See also ==
- 1977 in art
- Cats in the United States
- Cultural depictions of cats
