= Starr Kempf =

American artist (1917–1995)

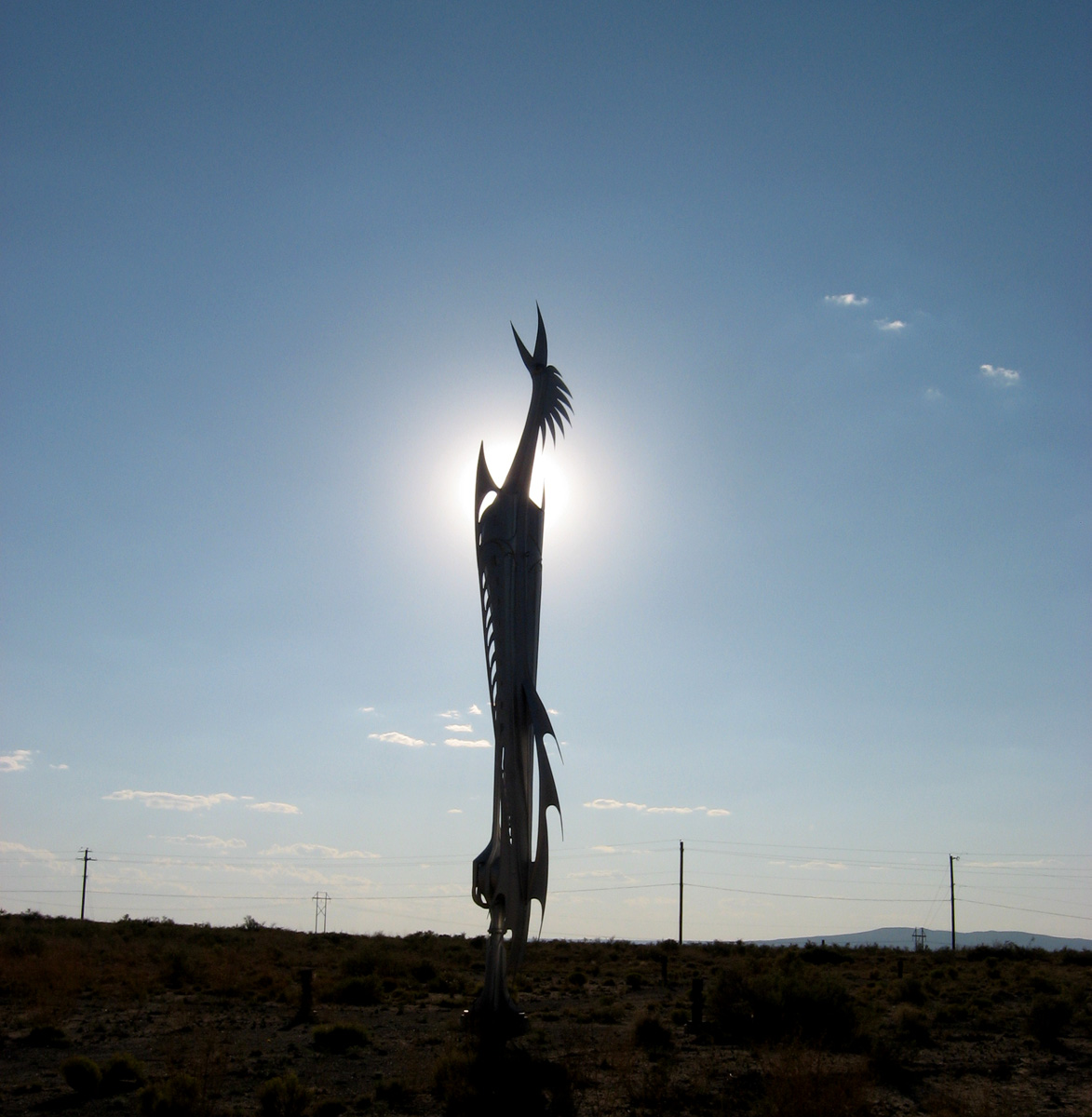
Sunrise Serenade

Starr Gideon Kempf (August 13, 1917 in Bluffton, Ohio – April 7, 1995 in Colorado Springs, Colorado) was an American sculptor, architect, and artist best known for his graceful steel wind kinetic sculptures.

== Personal life ==
Starr Kempf was raised on a small farm in Ohio, near the Swiss Mennonite community of Bluffton. His family, including his father and seven uncles, were blacksmiths and carpenters, from whom he learned craftsmanship and engineering at an early age.

He attended the Cleveland Institute of Art on a scholarship, where he received high marks for his paintings and drawings. After graduating, he served in the United States Air Force during World War II. He married recent German immigrant Hedwig Roelen in 1942, who was a nurse at Glockner Penrose Hospital in Colorado Springs. In 1948, they purchased the property of their future home in Cheyenne Canyon, where Starr designed and built a house and art studio. They had three children.

Kempf had been injured several times and experienced chronic pain. He was a heavy drinker and had "temper tantrums", once shooting one of his sculptures.

== Artwork ==
Starr began to work in bronze sculpture in 1955, which he sold to collectors around the United States.

As of 1977, his vision had blossomed into the creation of elaborate steel wind sculptures, each of which took him up to three years to construct. His kinetic wind sculptures were designed to exhibit graceful movement and interaction with the wind, with a few powering spotlights to showcase his pieces and one that triggered music as it rotated. His work often took the form of birds or weather vanes. His monumental sculptures often stood more than fifty feet in height. He never sold any of his monumentals.

At the time of his death, there were 10 or 12 significant sculptures displayed outside his home. He designed them for their original sites, and hoped that the city or the University of Colorado Colorado Springs would turn his home into a museum after his death. However, no contract was signed before he died.

== Death and legacy ==
Starr Kempf was diagnosed with heart disease in 1994. He died on April 7, 1995, at the age of 77. The cause of death was suicide.

After his death, his youngest daughter, Lottie Kempf, tried to turn the property into a for-profit art museum, called the Starr Kempf Sculpture Garden and Gallery, bringing in tour buses full of paying visitors. This led to conflicts with neighbors and the city over excessive traffic, placement of sculptures too close to the property lines, and related nuisances in the residential neighborhood. Lottie Kempf subscribed to pseudolegal ideas and declared that their home was exempt from city laws and zoning ordinances, which prohibited commercial businesses in the neighborhood and sculptures above a certain height. At one point, she filed a pro se lawsuit alleging that her nephew and the city council were the "agents of principal Kofi Annan" (the secretary general of the United Nations at the time). In 1999, the city sued to prevent further commercial activities. The lawsuit and subsequent media coverage resulted in hate mail and harassment of the neighbors. In 2003, the dispute was resolved with an order to remove eight of Kempf's sculptures, and the family began the removal process, over Lottie's objections. By 2024, all but four had been removed.

Three of the monumental kinetic sculptures were moved to a public park, Creekwalk, in nearby Cheyenne Canyon. Three others – "Sunrise Serenade," "Metronome" and "Space Needle" – have been loaned to the University of Colorado Colorado Springs' Ent Center for the Arts until 2034, and a pendulum-based one was installed at Plaza of the Rockies in downtown Colorado Springs.

The family organized an exhibition of his bronze works in 2007.

Kempf's work was honored in 2024 with an exhibition by dozens of artists in the Pikes Peak region, called "We Are The Sky".
