= Goose Hollow, Portland, Oregon =

Goose Hollow
- Neighborhood
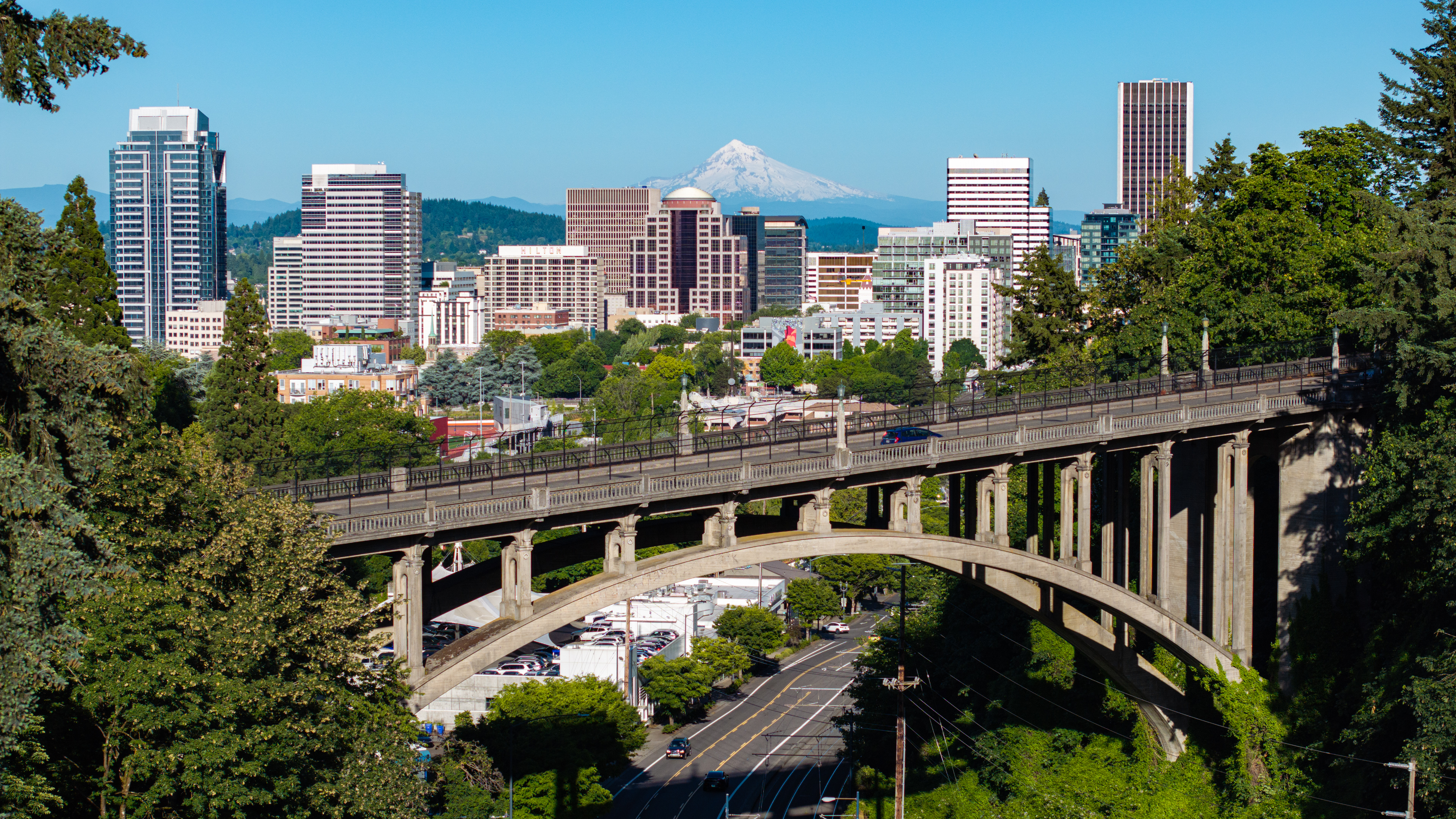
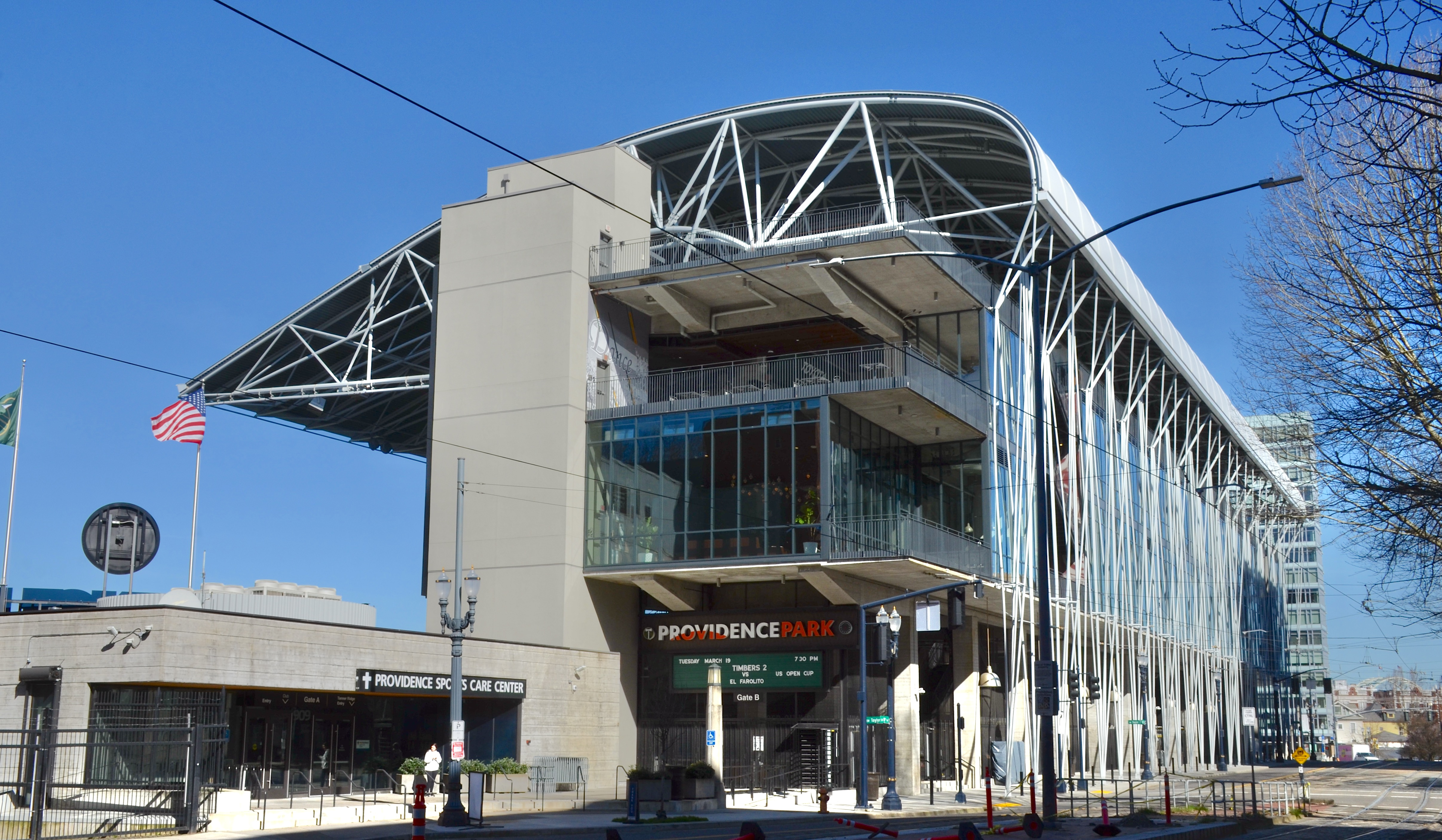
- Vista Bridge Providence Park Goose Hollow Inn Goose Hollow/SW Jefferson St station
- Interactive map of Goose Hollow
- Coordinates: 45°31′11″N 122°41′35″W
- Country: United States
- State: Oregon
- City: Portland

Government
  - Association: Goose Hollow Foothills League
  - Coalition: District Four Coalition

Area
  - Total: 0.45 sq mi (1.17 km^{2})

Population (2000)
  - Total: 5,433
  - Density: 12,000/sq mi (4,640/km^{2})

Housing
  - No. of households: 3792
  - Occupancy rate: 91% occupied
  - Owner-occupied: 540 households (14%)
  - Renting: 3252 households (86%)
  - Avg. household size: 1.43 persons

Goose Hollow is a neighborhood in southwest Portland, Oregon. It acquired its distinctive name through early residents' practice of letting their geese run free in Tanner Creek Gulch and near the wooded ravine in the Tualatin Mountains known as the Tanner Creek Canyon. Tanner Creek Gulch was a 20-block-long, 50-foot-deep (15 m) gulch (or hollow) that started around SW 17th and Jefferson and carried the waters of Tanner Creek into Couch Lake (now the site of Old Town/Chinatown and the Pearl District). Over a century ago, Tanner Creek was buried 50 feet (15 m) underground (where it still drains the West Hills), and the Tanner Creek Gulch was filled in. The only remaining part of the hollow is the ravine, Tanner Creek Canyon, carved out by Tanner Creek through which The Sunset Highway carrying US-26 passes and which the Vista Bridge spans, also called the Vista Viaduct.

The historically important Canyon Road connects to Jefferson Street underneath the Vista Bridge and was also called "The Great Plank Road." Canyon Road passed through Tanner Creek Canyon, which is how the road acquired its name. However, in the 1960s the section of Canyon Road that passes through the canyon was elevated (infilled with excavated dirt from Interstate 405's construction) and is now just a section of Highway 26. The Goose Hollow name had gone out of common usage for several decades until former mayor Bud Clark named his pub The Goose Hollow Inn in 1967 in an effort to "rekindle civic regard for the neighborhood." Clark resided in the Goose Hollow neighborhood.

== History ==
Although the city of Portland was first incorporated in 1851, the first home in Goose Hollow was built six years prior by Daniel Lownsdale in 1845. His land claim covered the North end of Goose Hollow including much of what is now King's Hill and Washington Park. Lownsdale operated a Leather Tanning where the Multnomah Athletic Club and Providence Park currently sit. This was believed to be the first tannery West of the Rockies and North of Mexico.

The name Goose Hollow was first used by The Oregonian in 1879.

== Location ==
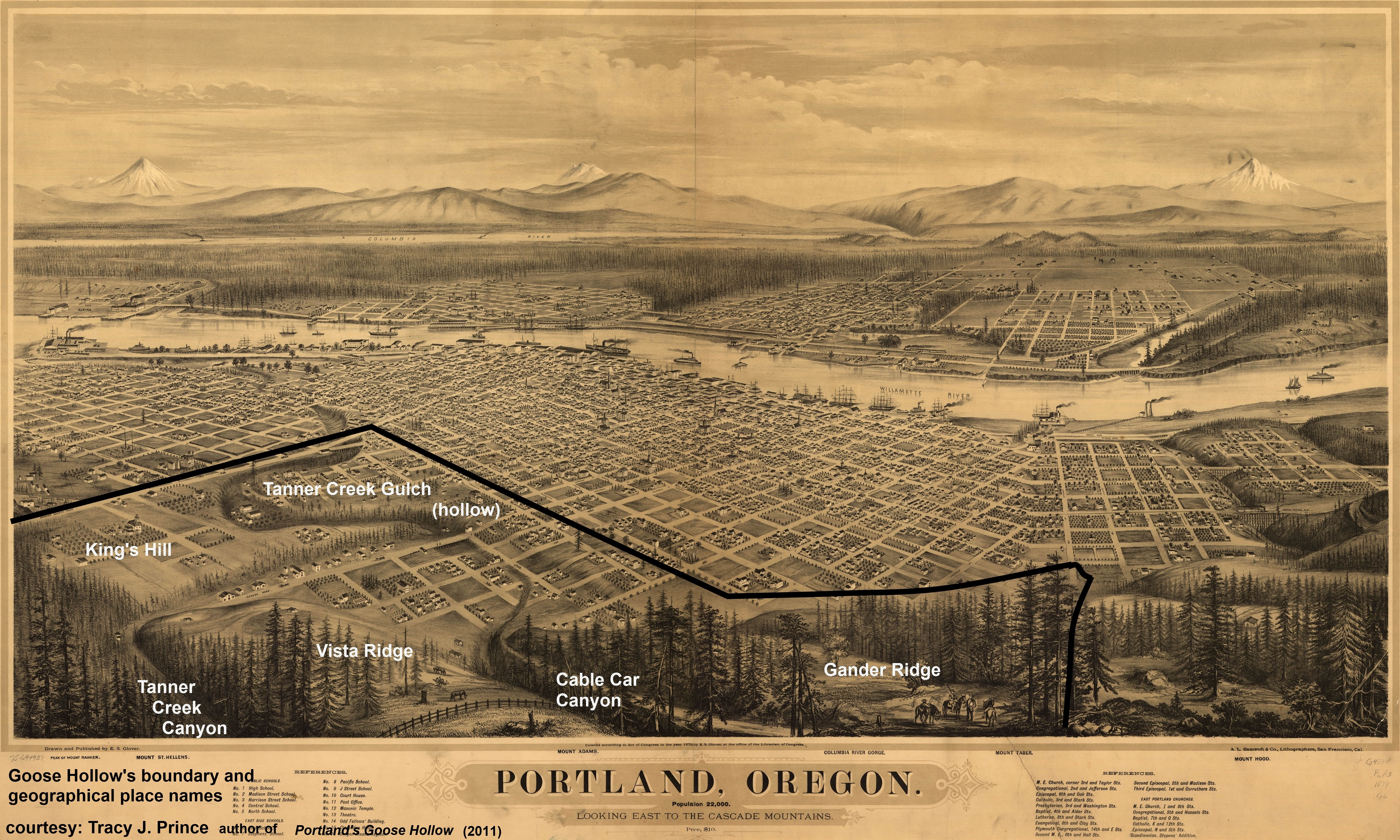
Goose Hollow's contemporary boundary and place names overlaid onto 1879 map

Goose Hollow is adjacent to Downtown Portland, Arlington Heights, the Pearl District, the Hillside neighborhood, Northwest District and Washington Park. Providence Park, the Multnomah Athletic Club, and Lincoln High School, the oldest high school in the Pacific Northwest, are located in Goose Hollow.

Areas included within the Goose Hollow neighborhood are King's Hill, Vista Ridge, Gander Ridge, and the adjacent flats near the path of Tanner Creek. King's Hill is separated from Vista Ridge by the Tanner Creek Canyon spanned by the Vista Bridge. Vista Ridge (where the Vista Ridge Tunnels are located) is separated from Gander Ridge by Cable Car Canyon. From 1890 to 1905 a steep and enormous trestle bridge passed through this canyon, carrying cable cars up to Portland Heights. The neighborhood boundaries range (north/south) from Burnside Street to the low slopes of the West Hills (officially known as the Tualatin Mountains) and (east/west) from I-405 to Washington Park.

== Transit and points of interest ==
The Red and Blue lines of the MAX Light Rail system travels through the neighborhood, stopping at Providence Park and Goose Hollow/SW Jefferson St stations with service extending to Portland International Airport, Hillsboro, and Gresham, Oregon. Goose Hollow is served by the TriMet's 6, 15, 19, 20, 24, 26, 51, 55, and 63 bus routes.

Goose Hollow is also served by two major freeways: Interstate 405, which divides it from Downtown Portland, and U.S. Route 26, which passes under and through part of the neighborhood through the Vista Ridge Tunnels.

Portland's only co-operative apartment, the Vista Park, was built in 1959. At the time of construction it was the only co-operative apartment complex in the state of Oregon

The Goose Hollow Inn, a tavern on SW Jefferson, opened in 1967 was owned by former mayor Bud Clark.

The Simpsons creator Matt Groening etched Bart Simpson into the East Sidewalk of SW 18th avenue in 1996 during construction of the now defunct Kings Hill/SW Salmon St station.

== Buildings ==
- Artists Repertory Theatre - 1515 SW Morrison St
- Civic Tower - 1926 West Burnside St.
- KGW - 1501 SW Jefferson St.
- Multnomah Athletic Club - 1849 SW Salmon St.
- Press Blocks - 898 SW 17th St.
- Providence_Park - 1844 SW Morrison St.

== National Register of Historic Places ==
- Bronaugh Apartments
- Brown Apartments
- Charles J. and Elsa Schnabel House
- Commodore Hotel
- David Campbell Memorial
- David T. and Nan Wood Honeyman House
- Dr. Noble Wiley Jones House
- Durham-Jacobs House
- Envoy Apartment Building
- Francis R. Chown House
- Gaston-Strong House
- Grace Kern House
- H.C. Wortman House
- Jacob Kamm House
- John Eben Young House
- King's Hill Historic District
- Levi Hexter House
- Mallory Hotel
- Neighbors of Woodcraft Building
- Portland Garden Club
- Rosamond Coursen and Walter R. Reed House
- Samuel W. King House
- Stratton-Cornelius House
- The Town Club
- W. R. Mackenzie House
- William and Annie MacMaster House
- Zion Lutheran Church

== Notable residents ==
Notable residents of Goose Hollow have included: Daniel H. Lownsdale, Charles Erskine Scott Wood, Congresswoman Nan Wood Honeyman, Erskine Wood, Dr. Marie Equi, John Reed, Abigail Scott Duniway, Julius Meier, Dr. Lendon Smith, Pietro Belluschi, Matt Groening, Minor White, Milton Wilson, Chuck Palahniuk, former Mayor Bud Clark, Ken Shores, George Johanson, and Jean M. Auel.

== In popular culture ==
A 1981 documentary film titled "the Hollow & the Hill" by Elizabeth Bunker and Mike McLeod was made to showcase the neighborhood. Through a grant from the city of Portland, the documentary was digitized in 2024.

The 1996 film Foxfire, the interior hallway scenes and a frog dissection scene were shot on site at Lincoln High School. The opening scenes for the 2004 film What the Bleep Do We Know!? were filmed in Goose Hollow and included views of the Vista Bridge and the Goose Hollow/SW Jefferson St MAX station. In 2010, the title shot for Portlandia was photographed from Goose Hollow's Vista Bridge.

To celebrate the 100 year anniversary of the Mulnomah Civic Center (now named Providence Park), the Portland Timbers, donned kits with a design paying homage to the venue. The Timbers have played home games at Providence Park since 1956. On September 5th, 2026, the Timbers hosted a Goose Hollow themed night celebrating the neighborhood in which they play. Plush Goose keychains wearing a green Portland Timbers scarf (named "Civic") were given away to the first 10,000 attendees and a limited edition run of Goose Hollow t-shirts, hoodies and scarfs were sold.

== Festivities ==
Beginning in 2017, the Goose Hollow Foothills league has hosted an annual free to attend festival titled "Goose Hollow Days". The multi weekend events take place in the months of August, September and October and celebrates the neighborhood. Activies include picnics at Providence Park, street fairs, neighborhood walks, concert performances and raffles. In 2026, Goose Hollow Days celebrated the 100 year anniversary of the Vista Bridge with a dog walk and festivities.
