= Francis R. Chown House =

Historic building in Portland, Oregon, U.S.

- U.S. National Register of Historic Places
- U.S. Historic district – Contributing property
- Portland Historic Landmark
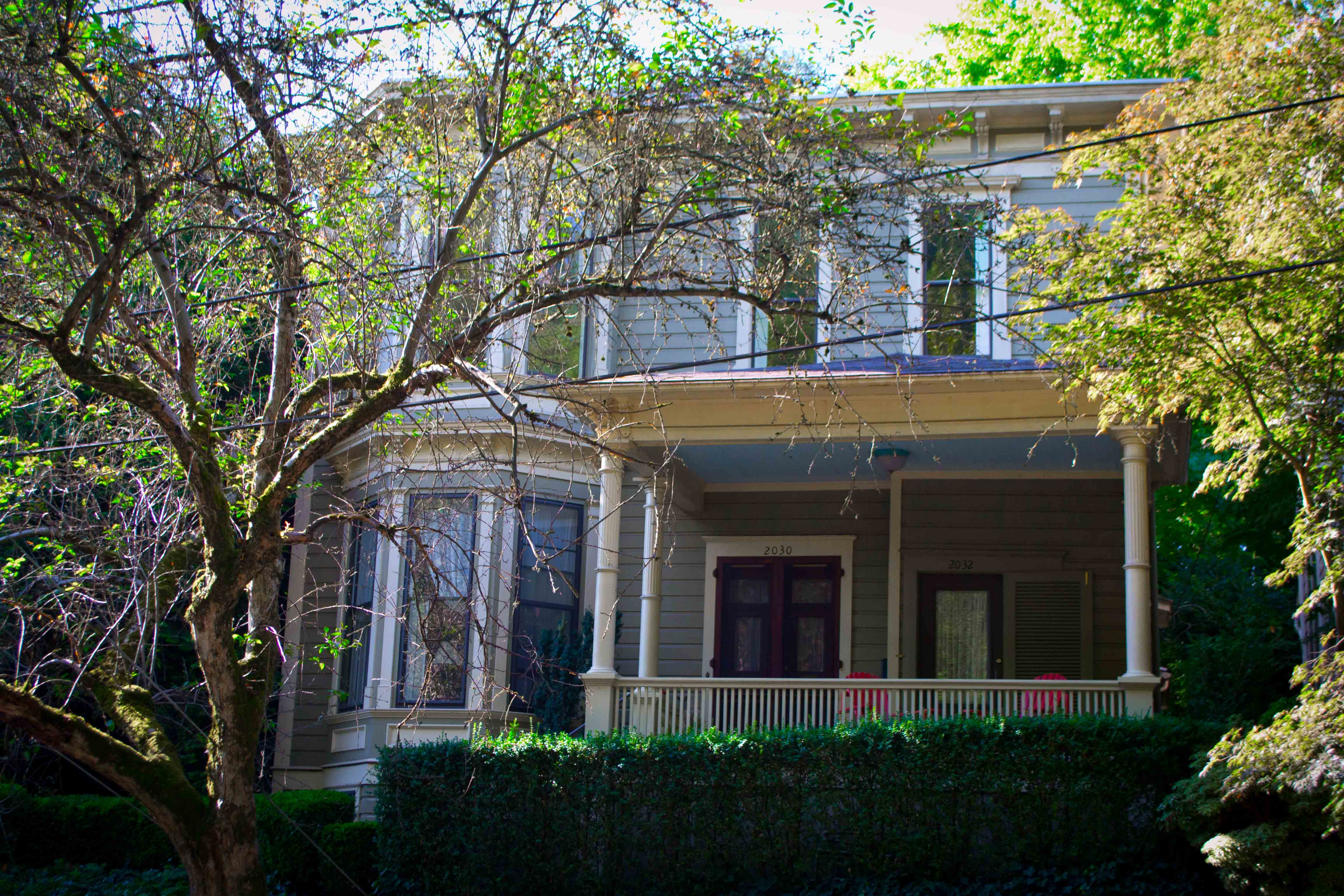
- The Chown House in 2012.

- Location within Portland, Oregon Location within Oregon Location within the United States
- Location: 2030–2032 SW Main Street; Portland, Oregon
- Coordinates: 45°31′12″N 122°41′41″W
- Area: 0.1 acres (0.040 ha)
- Built: 1882
- Architect: Otto K. Kleeman
- Architectural style: Italianate, High Victorian Italianate
- Part of: King's Hill Historic District (ID91000039)
- NRHP reference No.: 90000296
- Added to NRHP: February 23, 1990

The Francis R. Chown House is a house located in southwest Portland, Oregon. It is individually listed on the National Register of Historic Places and is also a contributing property of the King's Hill Historic District. It is located in the Goose Hollow neighborhood.

== See also ==
- National Register of Historic Places listings in Southwest Portland, Oregon
