= Kings Hill/SW Salmon St station =

Former light rail station in Portland, Oregon, U.S.

Kings Hill/SW Salmon St
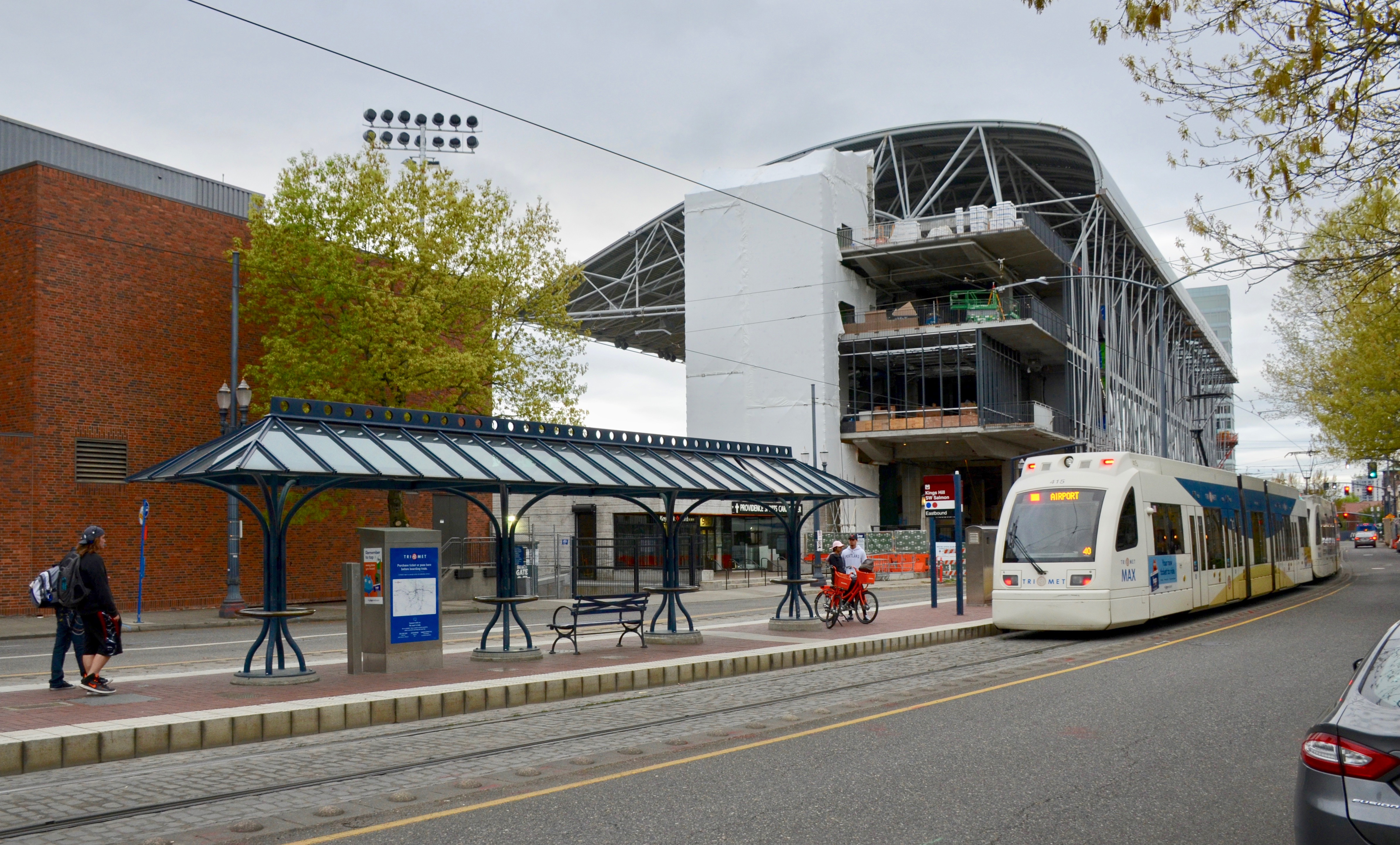
- Viewed from the south in 2019 with the Multnomah Athletic Club and Providence Park in background

General information
- Location: Southwest 18th Avenue and Salmon Street; Portland, Oregon, U.S.
- Coordinates: 45°31′13″N 122°41′28″W
- System: Former MAX Light Rail station
- Owner: TriMet
- Platforms: 1 island platform
- Tracks: 2

Construction
- Accessible: yes

History
- Opened: August 31, 1997
- Closed: March 1, 2020
Former services
Preceding station	TriMet	Following station
Goose Hollow/SW Jefferson St toward Hatfield Government Center	Blue Line 1997–2020	Providence Park toward Cleveland Ave
Goose Hollow/SW Jefferson St toward Hillsboro Airport/Fairgrounds	Red Line 2003–2020	Providence Park toward Portland Airport
Location

Kings Hill/Southwest Salmon Street is a former light rail station in Portland, Oregon, United States, which was served by the Blue and Red lines of TriMet's MAX Light Rail. The station was situated within the Goose Hollow neighborhood. Its incorrectly punctuated name refers to the hillside to the west of the station, which has historically been referred to as King's Hill. A section of King's Hill, which contains many historic buildings, qualified for inclusion within the King's Hill Historic District, the easternmost boundary of which is at SW 21st Avenue.

== Description and history ==
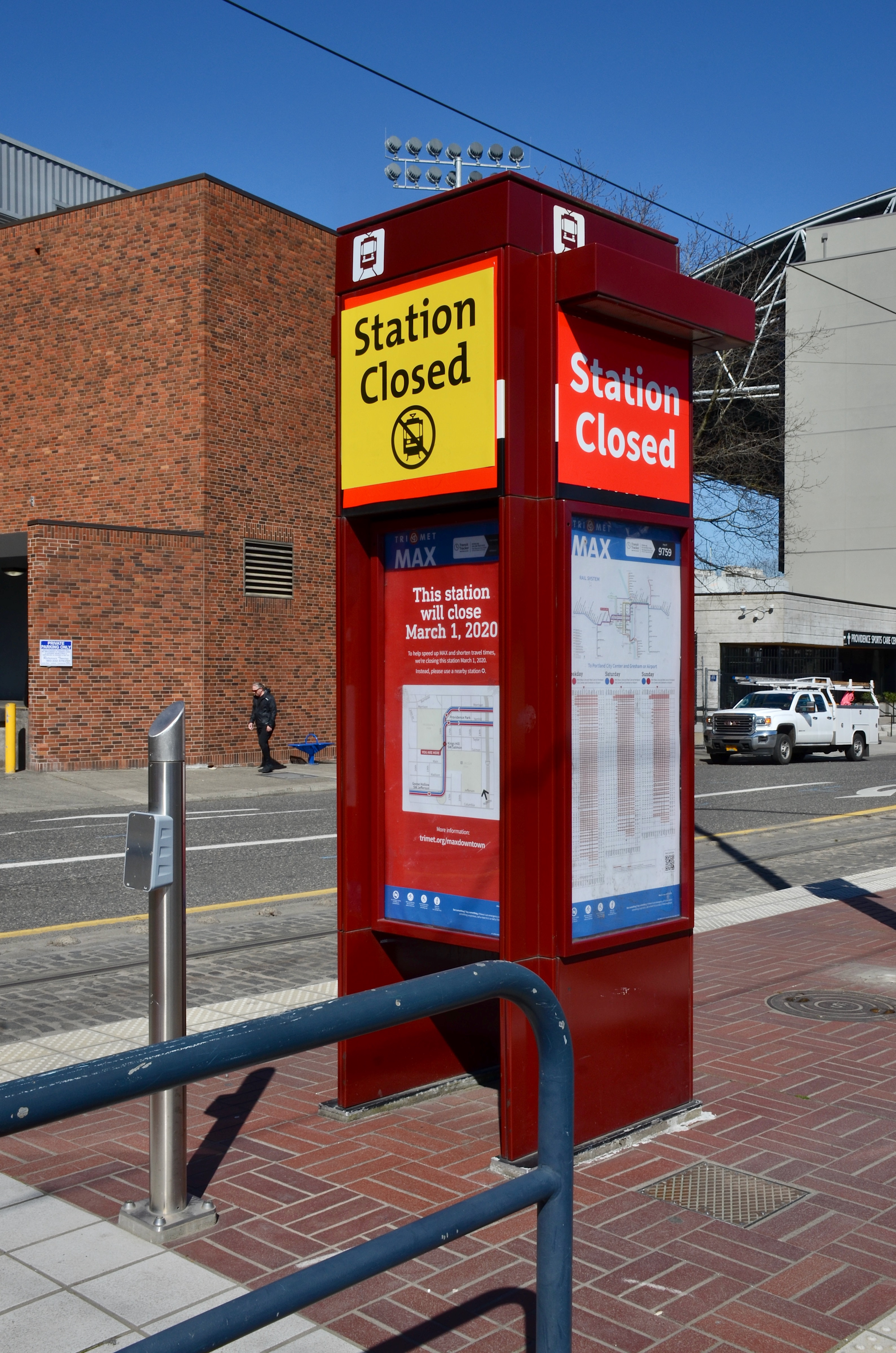
An information pylon at the station in March 2020, with signs indicating that it is now closed

The station was located in the center of SW 18th Avenue and had a single platform between the tracks. The platforms were accessed from the left-hand side of the train.

Despite the Providence Park eastbound station being only two blocks away, the station was added at the request of the neighborhood. It provided service to Lincoln High School and the Multnomah Athletic Club. Though one of the least-used downtown MAX stations, in 2006 a new condominium development nearby was expected to boost ridership.

On March 1, 2020, TriMet closed the station, alongside the stations at Pioneer Place mall, as part of a pilot program to improve MAX journey times through Downtown Portland. While the station was supposed to be closed for only a year, it has remained closed since.

=== Public art ===
Artwork around the station recalls Tanner Creek, which was buried and infilled early in Portland's history, and a bronze goose paying tribute to the Goose Hollow neighborhood. The Simpsons creator Matt Groening etched Bart Simpson into the east sidewalk of SW 18th Avenue in 1996 during the construction of this station. The City of Portland has opted to leave the sidewalk intact. SW 18th Avenue runs behind Lincoln High School, where Groening graduated in 1972.

== Bus line connections ==
When this station was in operation, it was served by the following bus lines:

- 15-Belmont/NW 23rd Ave
- 51-Vista
- 63-Washington Park
