= Canyon Road =

Street connecting Portland with Beaverton, Oregon, United States

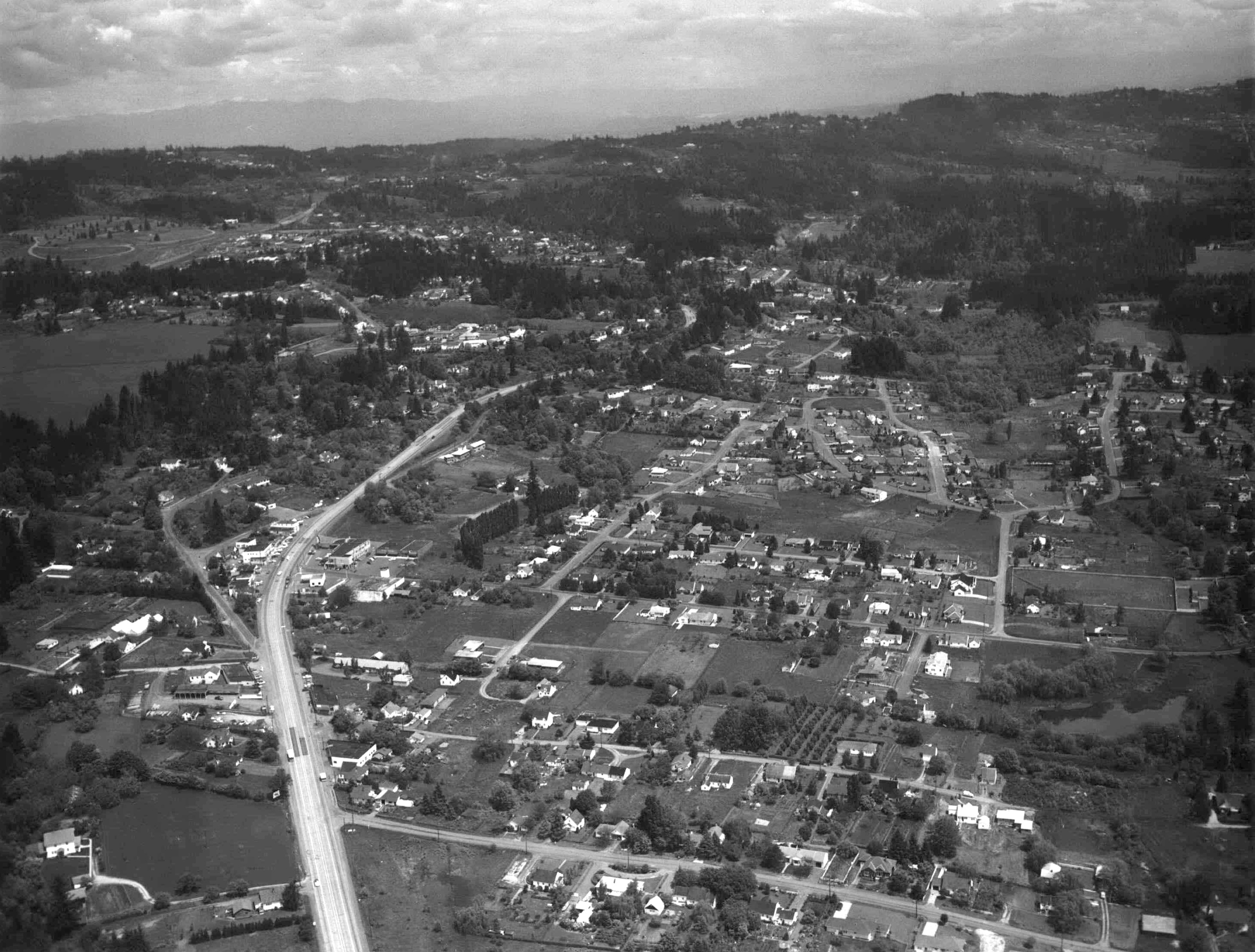
An early aerial photo of Canyon Road in West Slope, Oregon, near the city of Beaverton.

Canyon Road (formerly known as Great Plank Road) is a 6.5 mi (10.5 km) major road and partial state highway, which serves as a connector between Beaverton and Portland, Oregon, United States. It was the first major road constructed between the Tualatin Valley and Portland, and has contributed significantly to Portland becoming the area's major deep water port, and subsequent early growth of the city. The total modern length is 6.5 miles (10.5 km), and 2.7 miles (4.3 km) of the route is coterminous with U.S. Route 26. In addition, the segment of the road signed as Oregon Route 8 under the name Canyon Road spans for 3.8 miles (6.1 km). There is an additional, small portion of a driveway in the Oregon Zoo parking lot that is also named Canyon Road; this is a continuation of a local suburban street named Canyon Court.

== The Great Plank Road ==
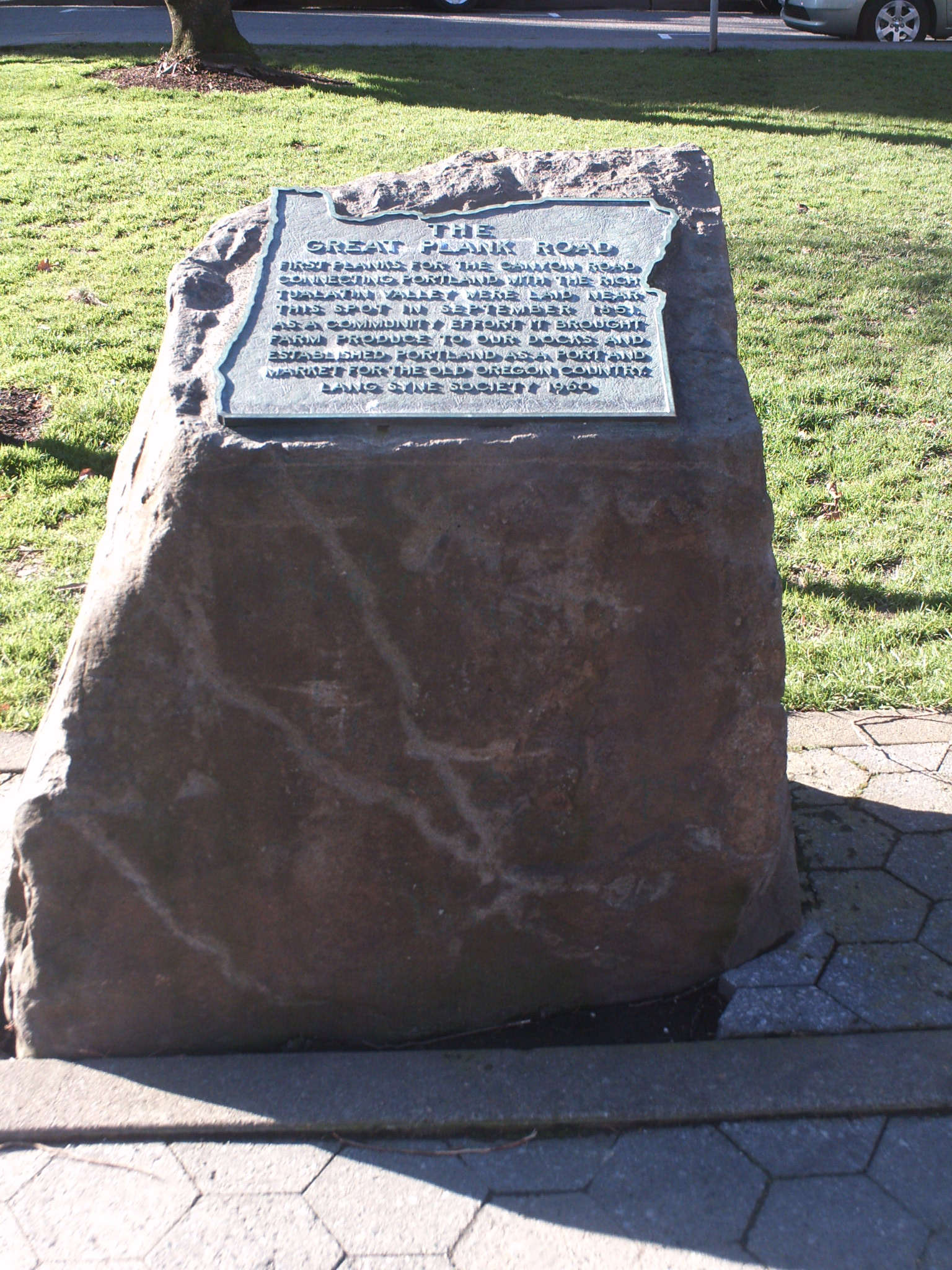
Plaque commemorating The Great Plank Road

By 1851, a dirt road, which was often muddy, ran between Portland and the Tualatin Valley—starting on Jefferson Street at the Willamette River then passing through Tanner Creek Canyon that cuts through the Tualatin Mountains. A plank road was suggested by Portland entrepreneur and proprietor Daniel H. Lownsdale as a means to transport abundant Tualatin Valley farm produce and grains to California Gold Rush-inflated markets in San Francisco, California. Col. William Williams Chapman, another proprietor, expended time and expense providing the basics for fledgling Portland in an effort to counter competition by other upstart towns and Hudson's Bay Company. He founded The Oregonian, enlarged Portland's platt, improving the city's streets, and ushered construction of Canyon Road. Others already invested in the city contributed to help make Portland the prime seaport of the region, including persuading others to join them, removing river obstructions, and importing goods from Asia and beyond.

The Portland & Valley Plank Road Company was chartered in January 1851 by the territorial government. Editor of the Weekly Oregonian newspaper, Thomas J. Dryer, immediately invested $500 and promoted the project. Stephen Coffin and William W. Chapman pledged $3,000, with Daniel H. Lownsdale pledging $2,000. Ultimately over $35,000 was pledged but not all was paid, with Coffin, Chapman and Lownsdale likely to have not paid in full.

Coffin gave the contract to a sawmill owned by himself and Simeon Reed, and the first plank was laid on September 27, 1851, leading to a large celebration. By November 1851, less than $3,000 in pledges had been collected, while $11,000 had been spent. The road had progressed fewer than three miles. The route, however, was excavated, following the canyon of Tanner Creek on the east side of the Tualatin Mountains.

By spring of 1852, just over $6,000 had been collected and $14,000 spent, leading to the replacement of management and directors. The project remained incomplete for three years until Supreme Court Justice Cyrus Olney required subscribers to pay at least 80% of the pledged amount. Back wages were still owed by December 1855, leading Olney to demand full payment from subscribers and for county sheriffs to find delinquent subscribers.

On January 25, 1856, the territorial government hired a new company to complete the road, and the city's merchant leaders (including William S. Ladd and Josiah Failing) raised $75,000 for the new Portland and Tualatin Plains Plank Road Company, finishing the road by the end of 1856. The road, though never completely planked, was favored by farmers of Polk, Yamhill, and Washington counties since it saved between three and ten miles (16 km) travel to the next nearest ports at St. Johns and St. Helens, but on a rough muddy road through deep woods. Harvey W. Scott said this new toll road was still difficult for travel and the entrance was "almost inaccessible", but the road was finished.

Part of Highway 26 now passes through Tanner Creek Canyon—the canyon near the Oregon Zoo as the highway approaches Portland's Goose Hollow neighborhood via the Vista Ridge Tunnels. However, Tanner Creek Canyon was originally a much deeper and narrower ravine. In the early twentieth century, when Tanner Creek was buried as it passes through Tanner Creek Canyon, the canyon was enlarged and infilled to raise Canyon Road. Then, in the 1960s when I-405 was being constructed, the excavated dirt was trucked into the canyon to further expand and fill Tanner Creek Canyon.

This is the commencement of an era of commercial prosperity which will continue to increase until the iron horse takes the place of the plank road.

— Mr. Tilford, orator at Canyon Road's laying of first plank.

In August 2015, remnants of the Great Plank Road were unearthed during a road widening project in Beaverton. The pieces weren't salvageable.

== Walker Road ==
In addition to the route through Beaverton, Canyon Road also referred to the road now known as Walker Road.

== Route ==
The historic route is almost completely paved over by modern roads. Beginning at Goose Hollow near where the Vista Bridge is now (45.51925°N 122.697973°W), Jefferson Street transitions into Canyon Road, both in street signs and modern maps. It went up the canyon behind the Vista Ridge Tunnels where the Sunset Highway—also known as U.S. Route 26—goes over Sylvan hill. Heading into Beaverton, the road took one of several routes into the city. Its route before 1883 is lost, but was presumably shared with the Portland-Lafayette Road, a predecessor road. Between 1883 and 1889, Canyon Road followed the alignment of today's Canyon Drive. Between 1889 and 1927, it followed the road now known as Canyon Lane. After 1927, it followed the modern Canyon Road. Two blocks west of Cedar Hills Boulevard, at the junction with Hocken Road (45.488163°N 122.812858°W), the contemporary road name changes to Tualatin Valley Highway ("TV Highway", though the original Plank Road continued farther west. The road continues down Farmington Road afterwards.

Approaching Hillsboro, the road begins to follow the rail line. The road then diverts south along the road now known as Witch Hazel Road, joining with the Hillsboro and Linn City Road. The road ultimately ends at Baseline Street in hillsboro.

A plaque to commemorate the road was placed in the South Park Blocks by the Lang Syne Society in 1991.

== See also ==
- List of streets in Portland, Oregon
