= Migration Brewing =

Brewery based in the U.S. state of Oregon

- Logo

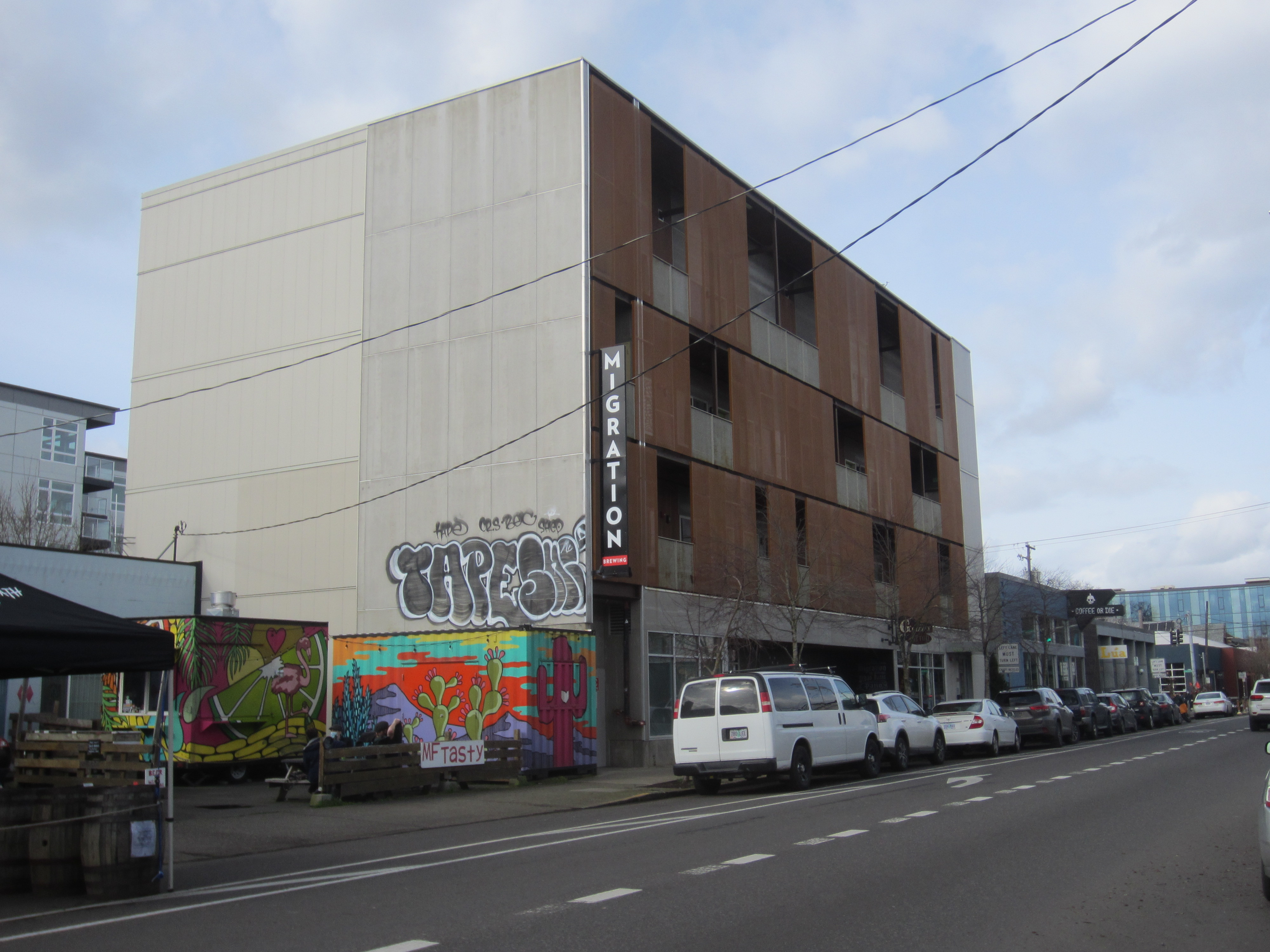
- Location: Portland, Oregon, United States
- Opened: 2021

Migration Brewing is a brewery based in the U.S. state of Oregon.

== Locations ==
The original pub opened on Glisan Street in northeast Portland. The company opened a location in north Portland in 2021.

Migration's taproom known as Rooftop at Canvas started as a pop-up in 2020 and opened permanently in 2021. The taproom is housed on the ninth floor on the Canvas building in the Press Blocks mixed-use development.

Migration has a production facility in Gresham.

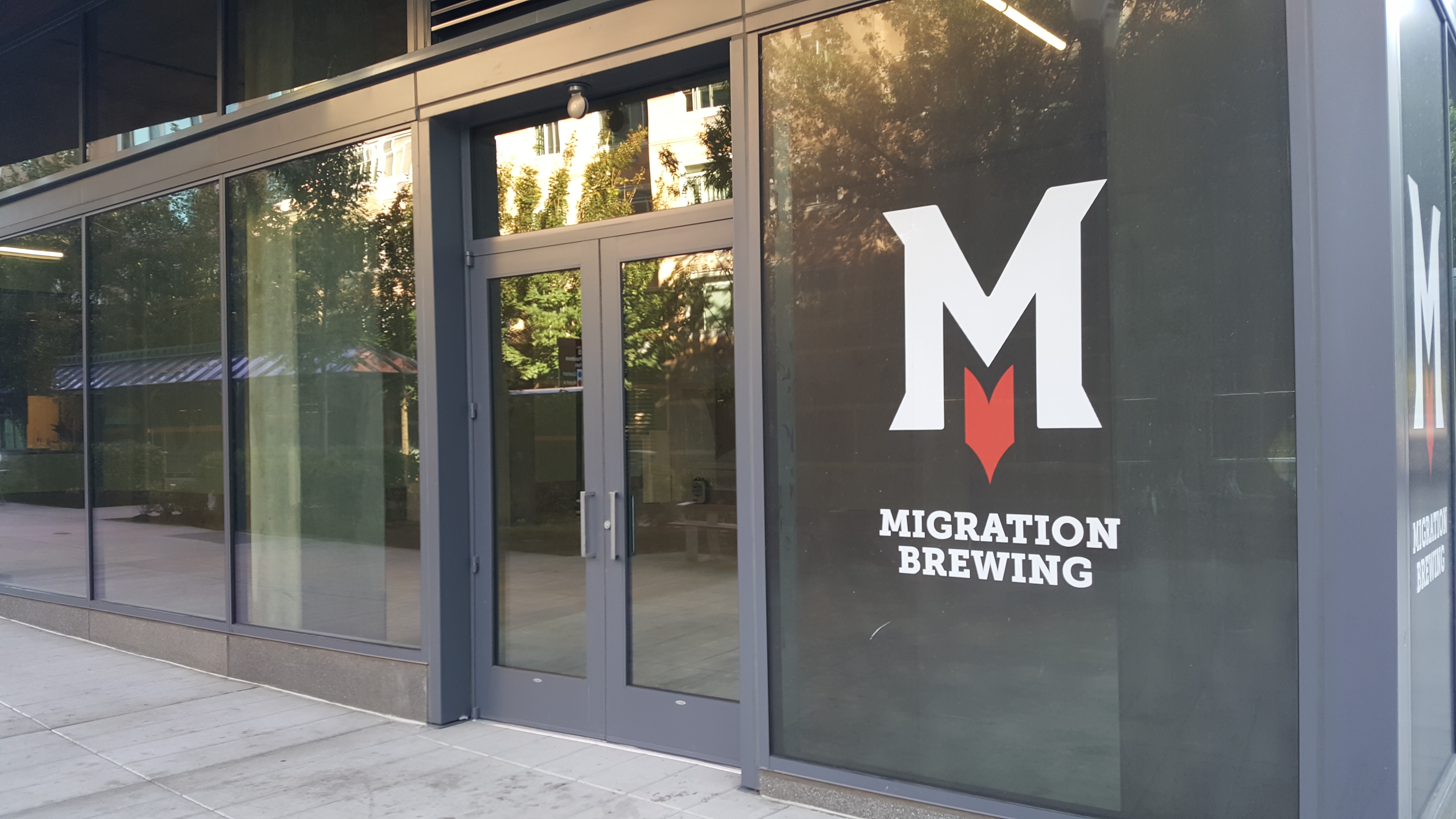
Sign for Migration Brewing at the Press Blocks, 2021
