= Vista Bridge =

Bridge in Portland, Oregon, U.S.

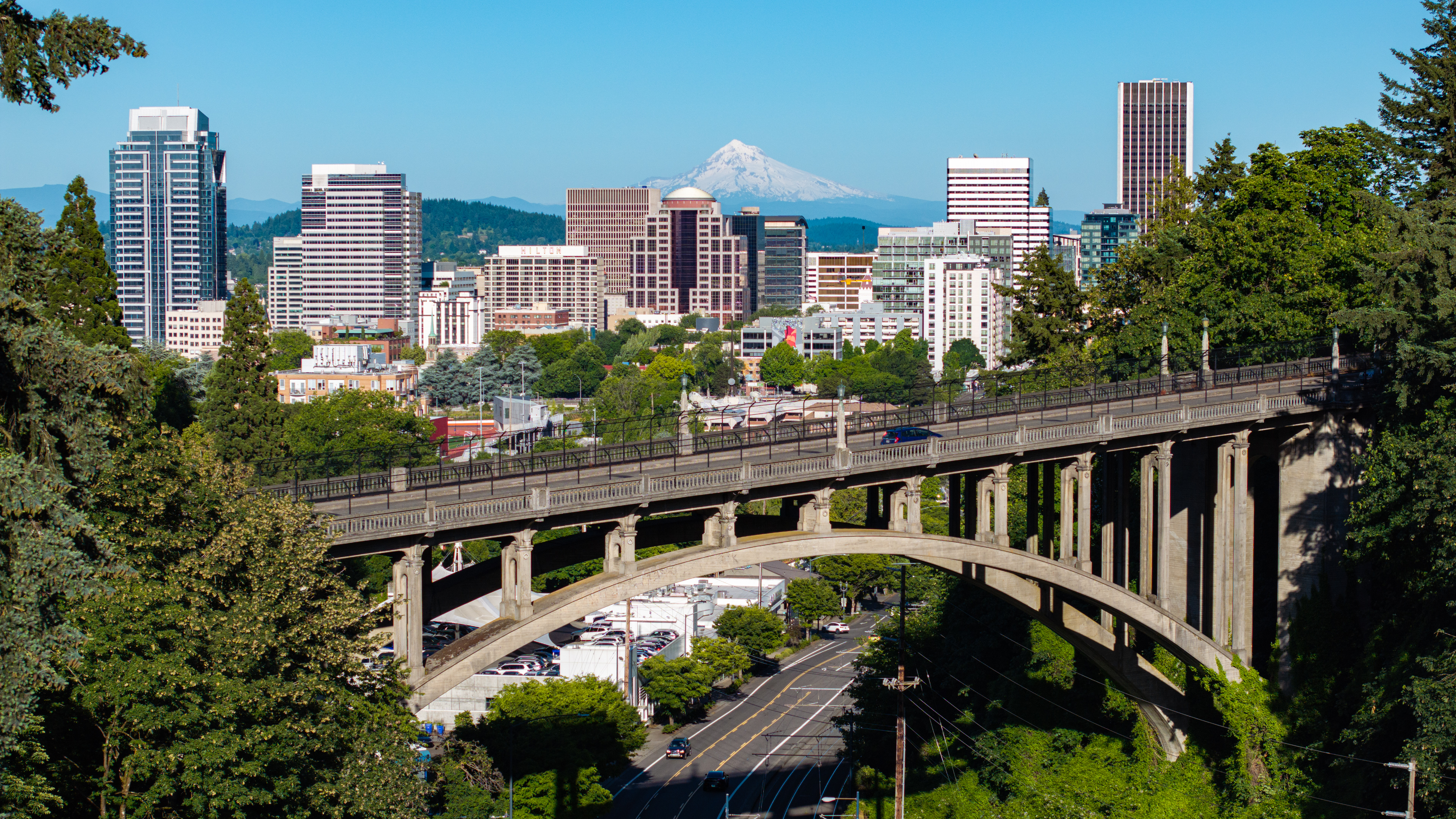
- Viewed from Jefferson Street, towards downtown
- Coordinates: 45°31′09″N 122°41′52″W
- Carries: Vista Avenue and pedestrians
- Crosses: MAX Light Rail line and Jefferson Street/Canyon Road
- Locale: Portland, Oregon
- Maintained by: Multnomah County

Characteristics
- Total length: 248 ft (76 m)
- Height: 120 ft (37 m)

History
- Opened: 1926
- Vista Avenue Viaduct
- U.S. National Register of Historic Places
- Portland Historic Landmark
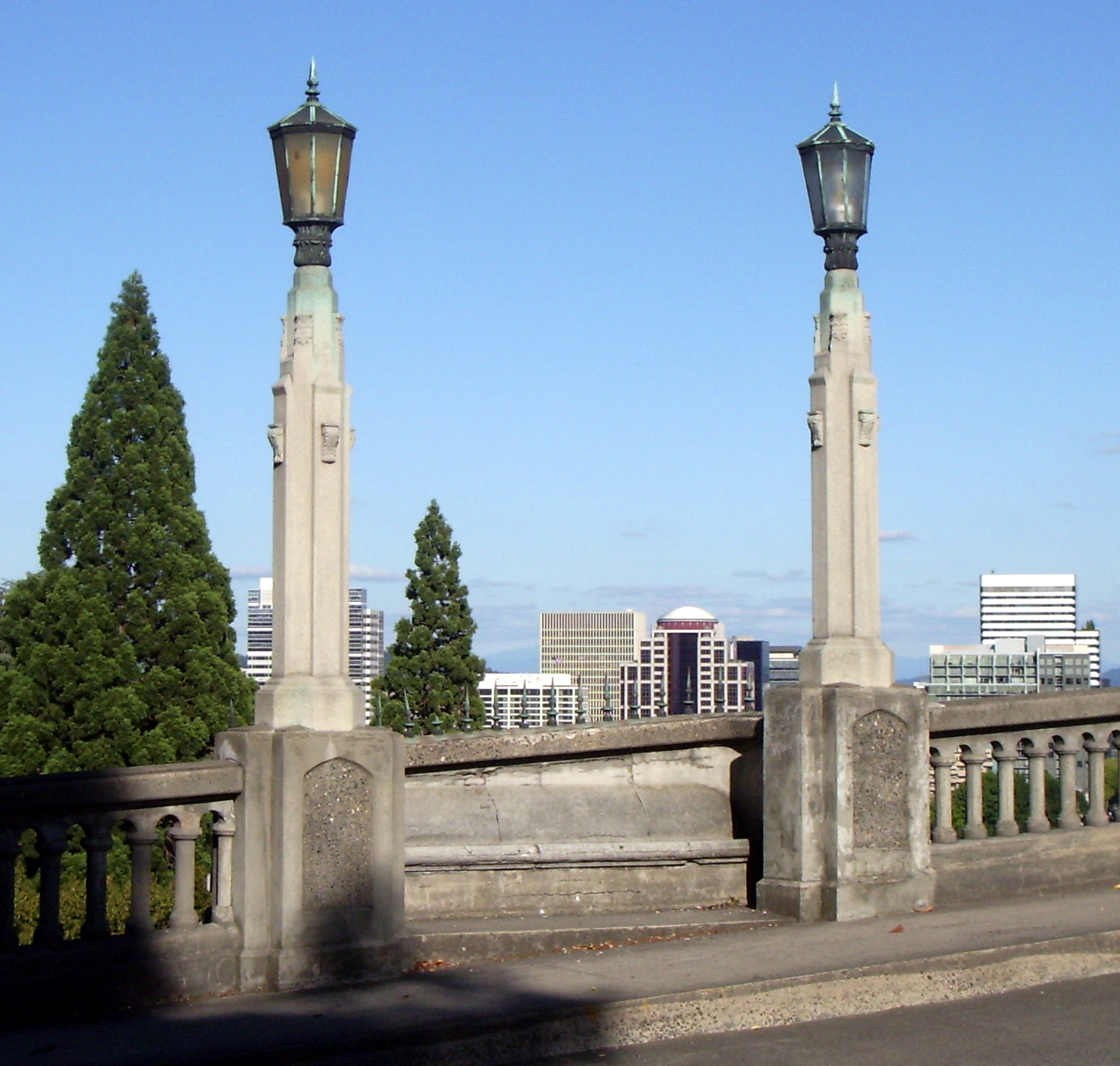
- Detail of light standards and benches mid-span, and view of downtown and east Portland

- Location within Portland, Oregon
- Location: 1200 SW Vista Avenue; Portland, Oregon
- Coordinates: 45°31′09″N 122°41′52″W
- Built: 1926
- NRHP reference No.: 84003093
- Added to NRHP: April 26, 1984

The Vista Bridge (officially, Vista Avenue Viaduct) is an arch bridge for vehicles and pedestrians located in Portland, Oregon, United States. It connects the areas of King's Hill and Vista Ridge (the entire southern hillside is also referred to as Portland Heights) which are both in the Goose Hollow neighborhood. The MAX Light Rail line and Jefferson Street/Canyon Road travel under the bridge, and Vista Avenue crosses the bridge.

== History and description ==
The ravine the Vista Bridge passes over was carved out by Tanner Creek and is referred to as the Tanner Creek Canyon (the source of the name for Canyon Road), which was called "The Great Plank Road". Tanner Creek was diverted underground beginning in the 1870s with work completed in the early 1900s. The creek still runs underground beneath the Vista Bridge, although it now drains the surrounding hillside via storm drains and a culvert to the Willamette River.

The bridge has four pedestrian balconies, or "refuge bays" (extensions outward from the sidewalk), holding concrete benches, two on each side. The 248-foot-long (76 m) structure was designed by architect Fred T. Fowler. It is of a rib-reinforced concrete deck arch design. Completed in 1926, it was added to the National Register of Historic Places, as the Vista Avenue Viaduct, on April 26, 1984.

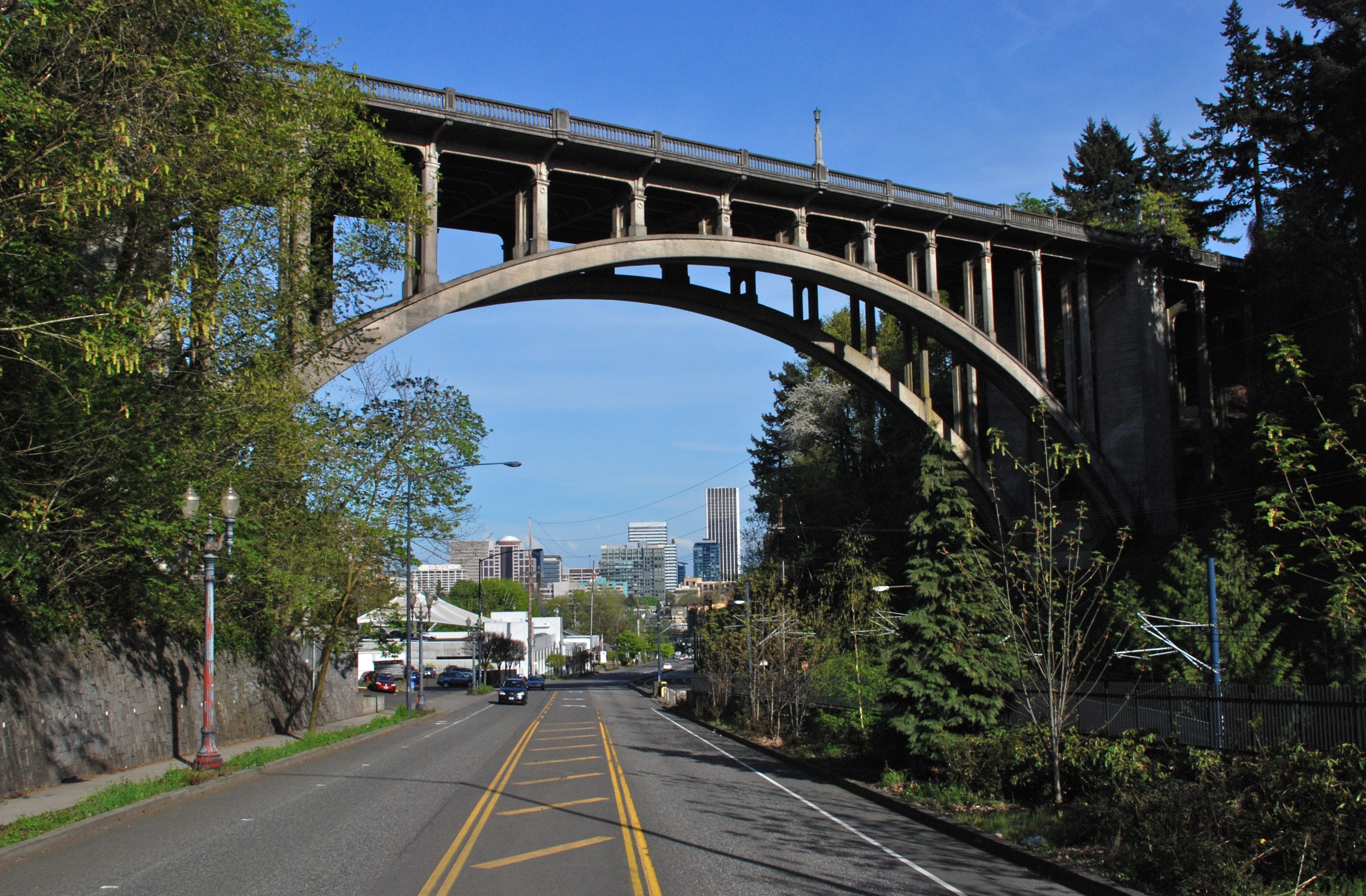
Vista bridge in 2012

The Ford Street Bridge, a previous bridge on this site, was built in 1903 as part of a streetcar route to Council Crest, the highest point in Portland, at 1,070 feet (330 m). Council Crest was the site of the "Big Tree Observatory" (built for the 1905 Lewis & Clark Exposition) and a popular amusement park and dance hall that operated from 1907 to 1929. Streetcars crossed the current bridge until 1950, when service on the Council Crest line (and the only other two then-remaining urban streetcar lines) was abandoned, but the disused tracks remained in place on the bridge for another four decades, until a renovation of the bridge deck.

In 1991, several bungee jumps were filmed here for an Oregon Lottery advertisement. Opening scenes for the 2004 film What the Bleep Do We Know!? were filmed in Goose Hollow and included views of the Vista Bridge and the Goose Hollow/SW Jefferson St MAX station. In 2010, the title shot for Portlandia was photographed from the Vista Bridge.

=== Usage for suicide ===
The bridge has been a popular place for jumpers, with the first incident possibly occurring five years after its 1926 opening, earning it the nickname "Suicide Bridge". From 2004 through 2011, 13 people died by suicide by jumping. In July 2013, following three fatal jumps in six months, Portland City Commissioner Steve Novick approved an emergency request by the Portland Transportation Bureau to erect temporary suicide barriers. Because of its status on the National Register of Historic Places the bridge's barrier had to be approved by the Preservation Society under the National Historic Preservation Act and by the State Historic Preservation Office and any federal and state agencies that provide funding. Following the erection of a suicide barrier in the fall of 2013, as a result of protest on the behalf of local residents, a would-be jumper managed to get around the barrier but was talked down by police; in January 2014, a 14-year-old boy shot and killed himself on the bridge, tumbling onto the adjacent embankment.

== See also ==
- List of bridges on the National Register of Historic Places in Oregon
- Viaduct
