= Levi Hexter House =

Historic building in Portland, Oregon, U.S.

- U.S. National Register of Historic Places
- U.S. Historic district – Contributing property
- Portland Historic Landmark
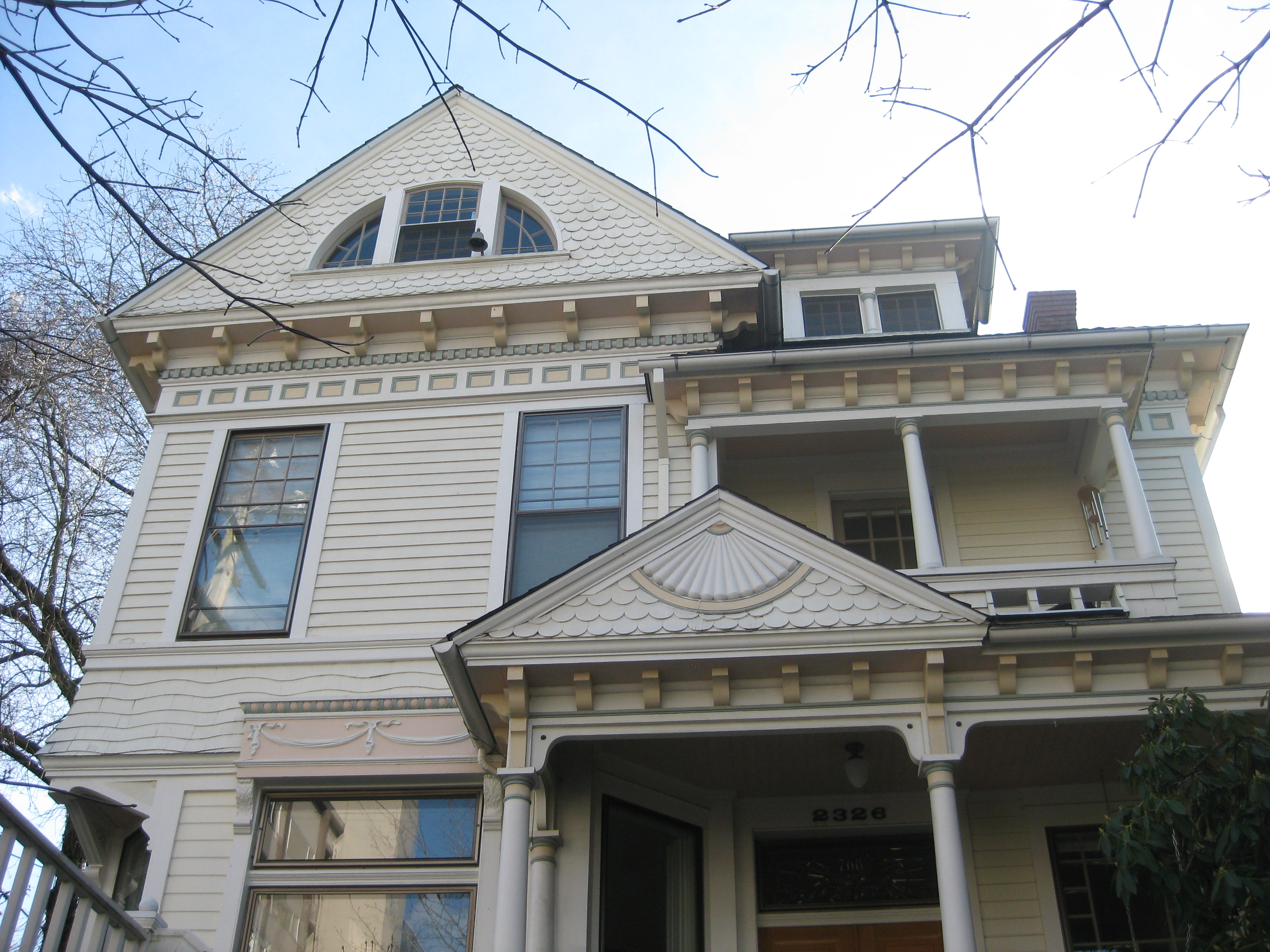

- Location within Portland, Oregon
- Location: 2326 SW Park Place; Portland, Oregon
- Coordinates: 45°31′16″N 122°41′56″W
- Built: 1892–1893
- Architectural style: Queen Anne
- Part of: King's Hill Historic District (ID91000039)
- NRHP reference No.: 80003367
- Added to NRHP: February 12, 1980

The Levi Hexter House is a historic house located in southwest Portland, Oregon, United States that is listed on the National Register of Historic Places. It is located within the King's Hill Historic District.

The house was built in 1892–1893 by Levi Hexter (1836–1897), a prominent Jewish businessman who founded the Hexter, May & Co. hardware store with Levi May. May helped found the Temple Beth Israel synagogue. Levi and Laura (née May) Hexter had two sons and three daughters who lived in the house (one son had died previous to the house's construction). After Laura Hexter's death in 1917, the house became a boarding house; and there are also unverified claims that the house was the site of bootlegging during Prohibition of the 1920s. Starting in the 1960s, it went through a complete restoration by owner Robert Perron, a prominent Portland landscape architect responsible for the landscape designs of Terry Schrunk Plaza, the Portland Art Museum and Keller Auditorium.

== See also ==
- National Register of Historic Places listings in Southwest Portland, Oregon
