= Samuel W. King House =

Historic building in Portland, Oregon, U.S.

- U.S. National Register of Historic Places
- U.S. Historic district – Contributing property
- Portland Historic Landmark
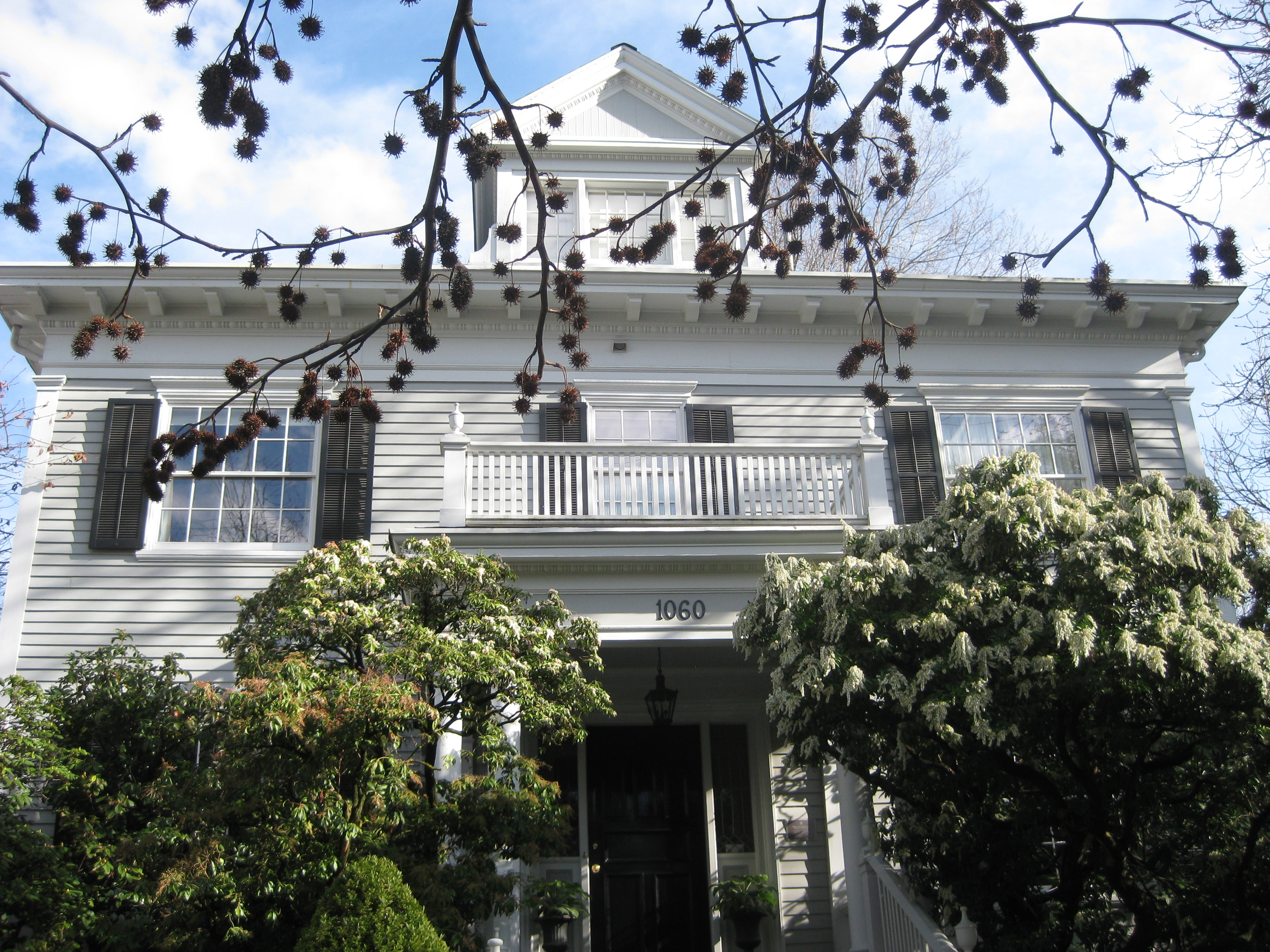
- The King House in 2010.

- Location within Portland, Oregon
- Location: 1060 SW King Avenue; Portland, Oregon
- Coordinates: 45°31′13″N 122°41′43″W
- Area: less than one acre
- Built: 1898
- Architectural style: Colonial Revival
- Part of: King's Hill Historic District (ID91000039)
- NRHP reference No.: 87001471
- Added to NRHP: September 8, 1987

The Samuel W. King House is a house located in southwest Portland, Oregon listed on the National Register of Historic Places.

== See also ==
- National Register of Historic Places listings in Southwest Portland, Oregon
