= Providence Park station =

Light rail station in Portland, Oregon

Providence Park
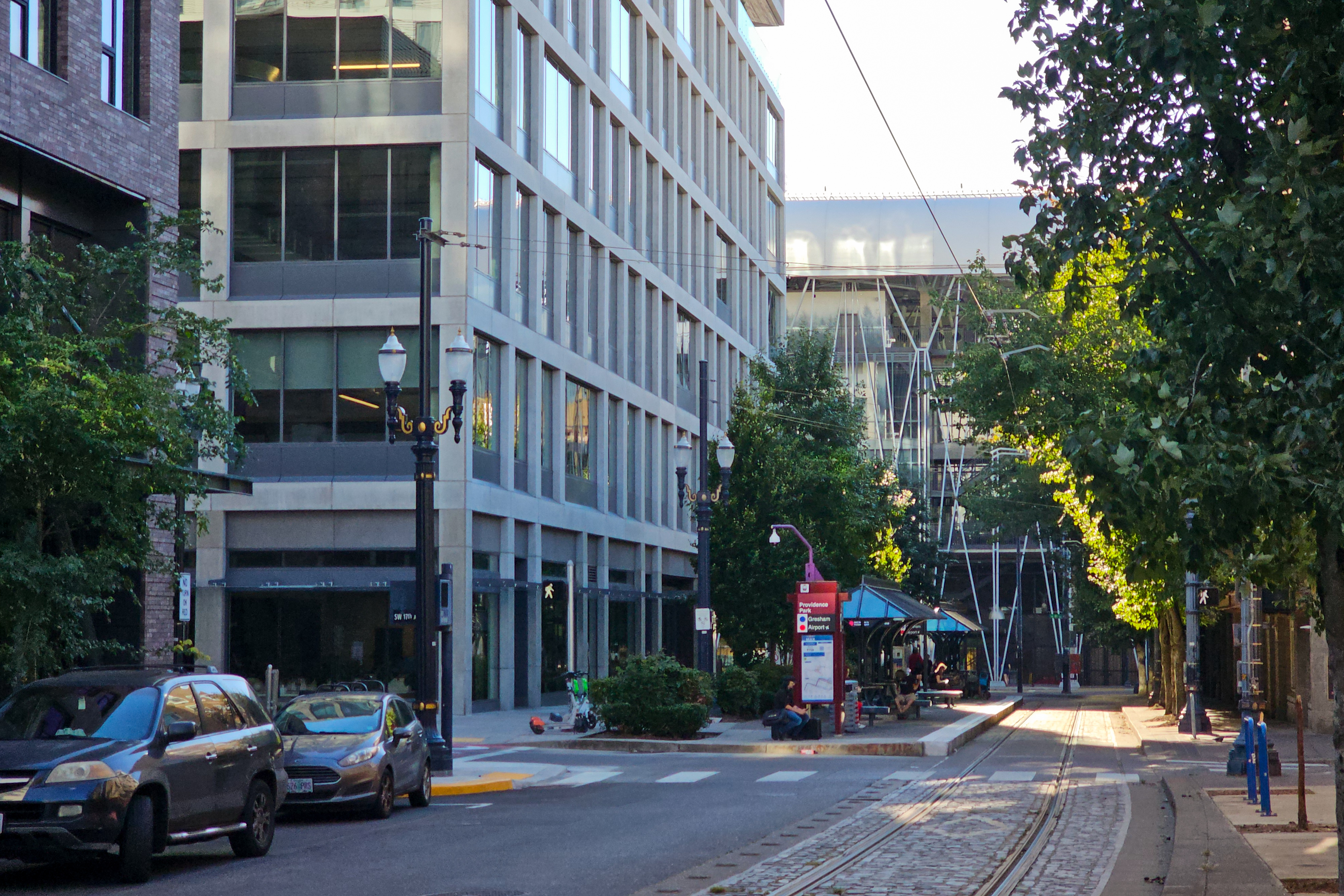
- The eastbound platform shown in 2026

General information
- Location: SW 18th and Morrison (westbound); SW 17th and Yamhill (eastbound); Goose Hollow, Portland OR; USA
- Coordinates: 45°31′18.5″N 122°41′23″W
- Owner: TriMet
- Platforms: Side platforms
- Tracks: 3

Construction
- Cycle facilities: Lockers
- Accessible: yes

History
- Opened: August 31, 1997
- Former names: Civic Stadium station (1997–2001); PGE Park station (2001–2011); Jeld-Wen Field station (2011–2014)

Services
| Preceding station | TriMet | Following station |
|---|---|---|
| Goose Hollow/SW Jefferson St toward Hatfield Government Center | Blue Line | Galleria/SW 10th Ave One-way operation |
| Goose Hollow/SW Jefferson St toward Hatfield Government Center | Blue Line | Library/SW 9th Ave toward Cleveland Ave |
| Goose Hollow/SW Jefferson St toward Hillsboro Airport/Fairgrounds | Red Line | Galleria/SW 10th Ave One-way operation |
| Goose Hollow/SW Jefferson St toward Hillsboro Airport/Fairgrounds | Red Line | Library/SW 9th Ave toward Portland Airport |
Former services
| Preceding station | TriMet | Following station |
|---|---|---|
| Kings Hill/Southwest Salmon Street (closed) toward Hatfield Government Center | Blue Line | Galleria/SW 10th Ave One-way operation |
| Kings Hill/Southwest Salmon Street (closed) toward Hatfield Government Center | Blue Line | Library/SW 9th Ave toward Cleveland Ave |
| Kings Hill/Southwest Salmon Street (closed) toward Hillsboro Airport/Fairgrounds | Red Line | Galleria/SW 10th Ave One-way operation |
| Kings Hill/Southwest Salmon Street (closed) toward Hillsboro Airport/Fairgrounds | Red Line | Library/SW 9th Ave toward Portland Airport |
Location

Providence Park is a light rail station on the MAX Blue and Red lines located in the Goose Hollow neighborhood of Portland, Oregon. It is named after the adjacent stadium, Providence Park. The station primarily serves Providence Park and residential areas around West Burnside Street. The station, consisting of separate eastbound and westbound platforms built into city sidewalks between SW 17th and SW 18th Avenues on SW Yamhill and SW Morrison Streets, opened on August 31, 1997.

Originally named Civic Stadium, it was renamed to PGE Park in 2001, Jeld-Wen Field in 2011, and to its present name in 2014. All of the renamings were the results of changes in the name of the stadium.

== Station details ==
Tracks split just outside the station on SW 18th Ave. into eastbound tracks on SW Yamhill St. and westbound tracks on SW Morrison St. This split results in a transit mall east to SW 1st Ave.

The Morrison platform is at an angle to the street grid and has a regular side platform which fronts a small public plaza. There is also a second platform and storage track used for special events. The Yamhill Street platform takes the entire block from 17th to 18th. A large apartment complex occupies the space between the platforms.

=== Public art ===
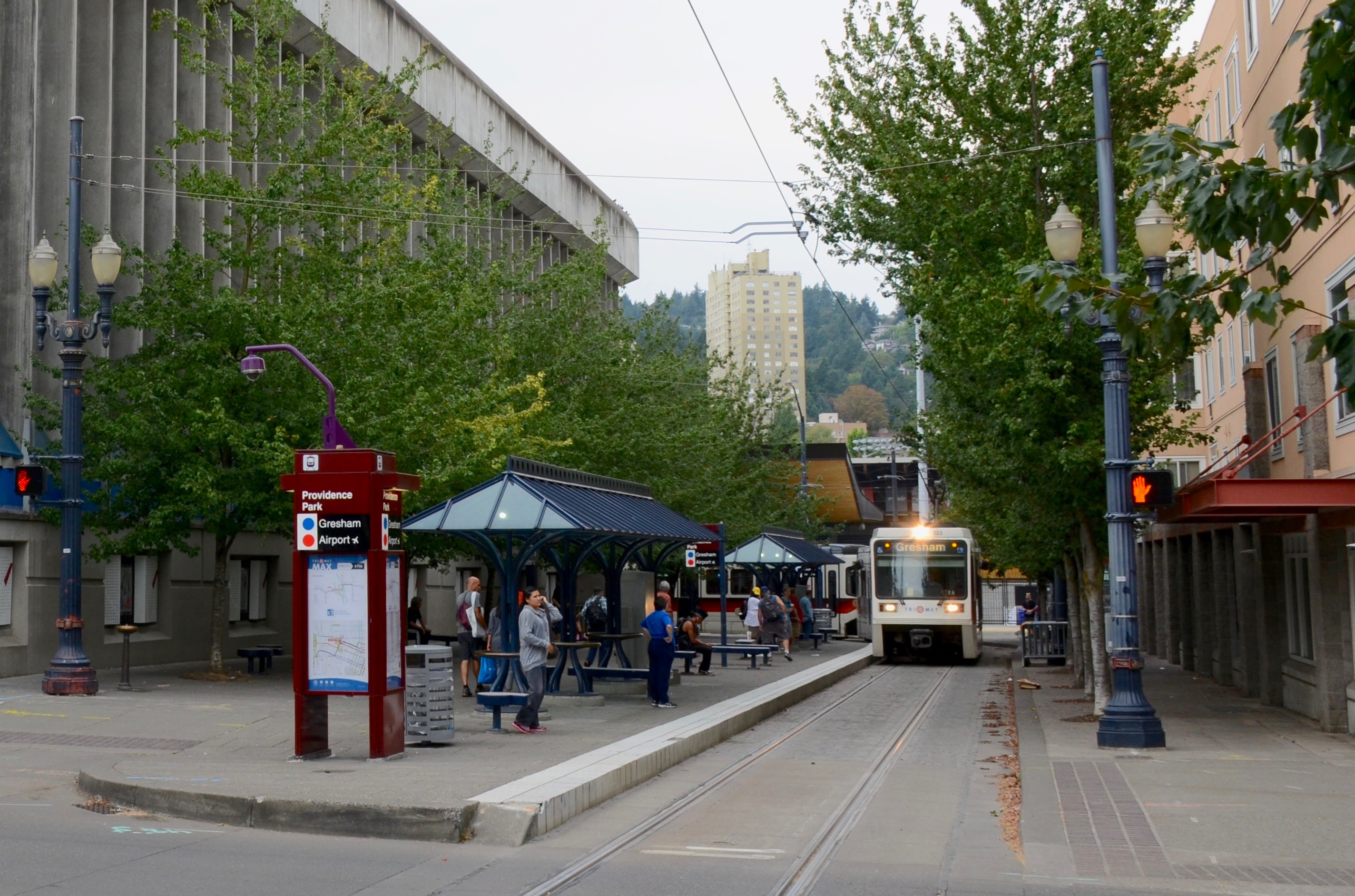
The station's eastbound platform, shown in 2015, is located on Yamhill Street and is separate from the westbound platform. One building of the former Oregonian printing plant is at left.

The station's southern platform (used by eastbound trains), on Yamhill Street, was located directly adjacent to the longtime printing plant of the city's major newspaper, The Oregonian, until the plant's closure in 2015 and demolition in 2018. As a reflection of this, TriMet chose "communication" as the theme for the public art at this station – known as Civic Stadium station at the time of its opening, in 1997 – "celebrating the importance of communication to the vitality of our city".

The Yamhill platform features unique seating shaped like punctuation marks. The nearby westbound platform features small bronze pedestals in the shapes of a "stump, capital and soapbox, suggest[ing] podiums for impromptu oratories". A utility building is adorned with stainless-steel panels etched with poems by writer Robert Sullivan on the history of the region and "great moments in Oregon free-speech history", Oregonian architecture critic Randy Gragg wrote in a 1998 review.

== Bus line connections ==
This station is served by the following bus lines:

- 15-Belmont/NW 23rd
- 18-Hillside
- 24-Fremont/NW 18th
- 26-Thurman/NW 18th
- 51-Vista/Sunset Blvd
- 63-Washington Park

The line 20-Burnside/Stark also stops two blocks north of the station on West Burnside Street at NW 19th Avenue (westbound) and NW 18th Avenue (eastbound).
