= Stephen Coffin =

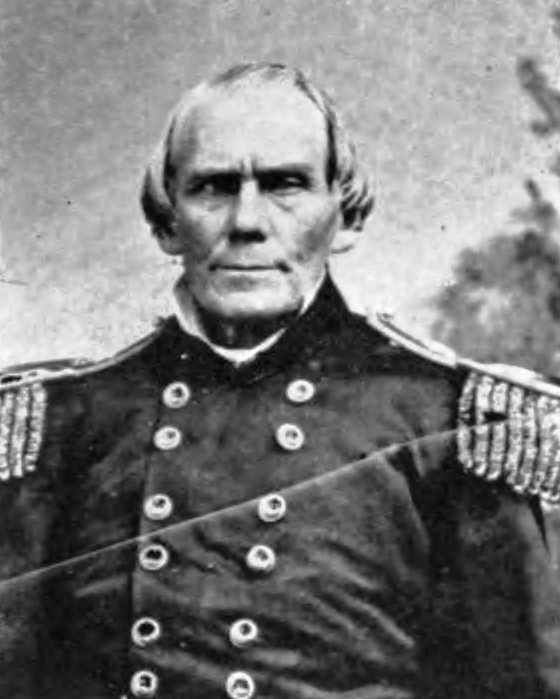
- Stephen Coffin
- Born: 1807; Maine
- Died: March 16, 1882; Dayton, Oregon
- Spouse: Lucina Coffin

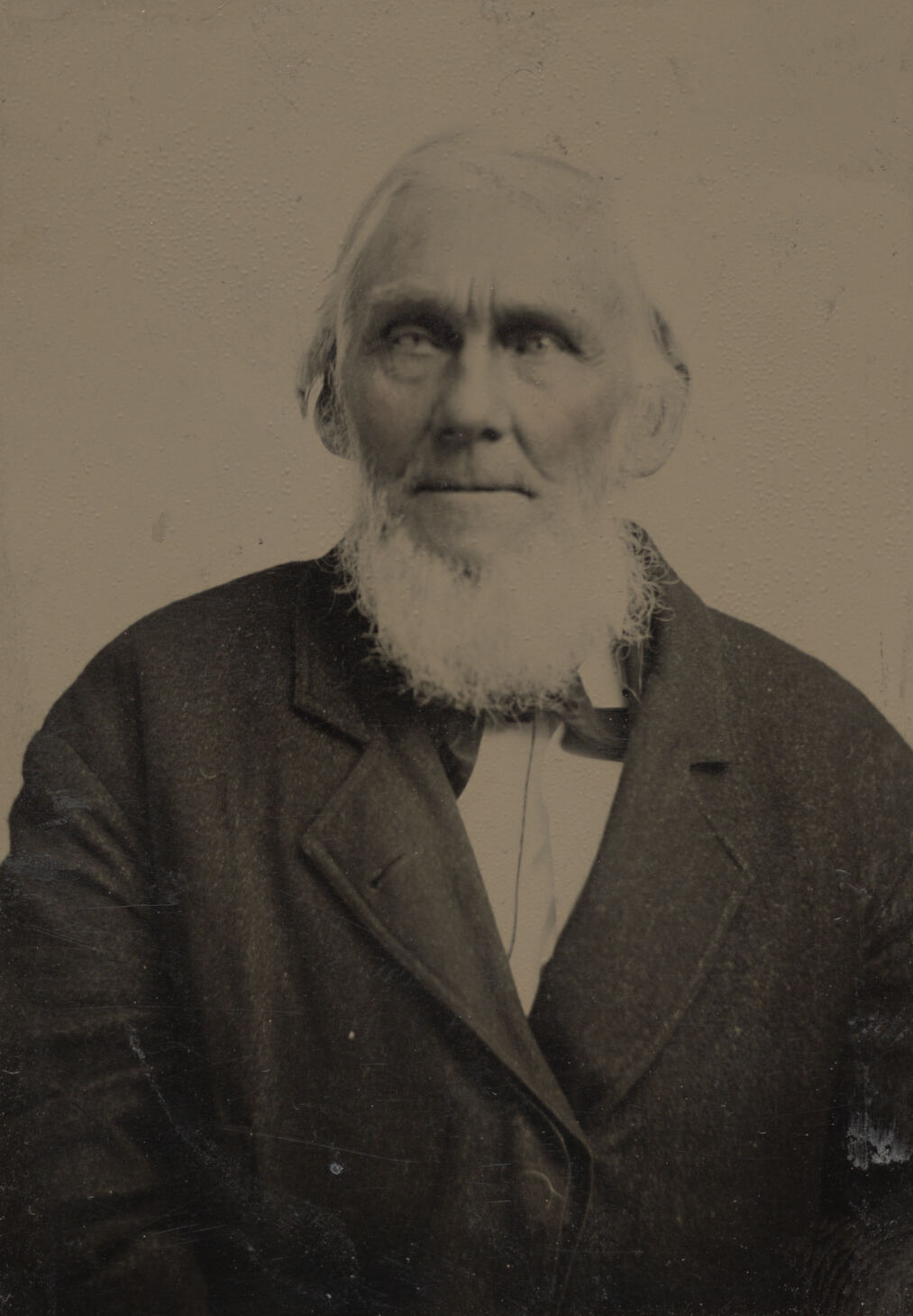
Stephen Coffin - 1847 (cropped)

Stephen Coffin (1807 – 1882) was an investor, promoter, builder, and militia officer in mid-19th century Portland in the U.S. state of Oregon. Born in Maine, he moved to Oregon City in 1847, and in 1849 he bought a half-interest in the original Portland townsite.

Coffin's interests included the Tualatin Plank Road between Portland and the Tualatin Valley, the Oregon Iron Company, an eastern Oregon sawmill, bridge-building, and other investments and projects. In 1856, he and a neighbor, Finice Caruthers, established the Pioneer Water Works to supply drinking water to Portland. In that same year, he helped found the Oregon Republican Party and was elected to the Portland city council a year later. His interests in transportation extended beyond roads and bridges to investments in the People's Transportation Company, which controlled shipping on the upper Willamette River in the 1860s, and the Oregon Central Railroad.

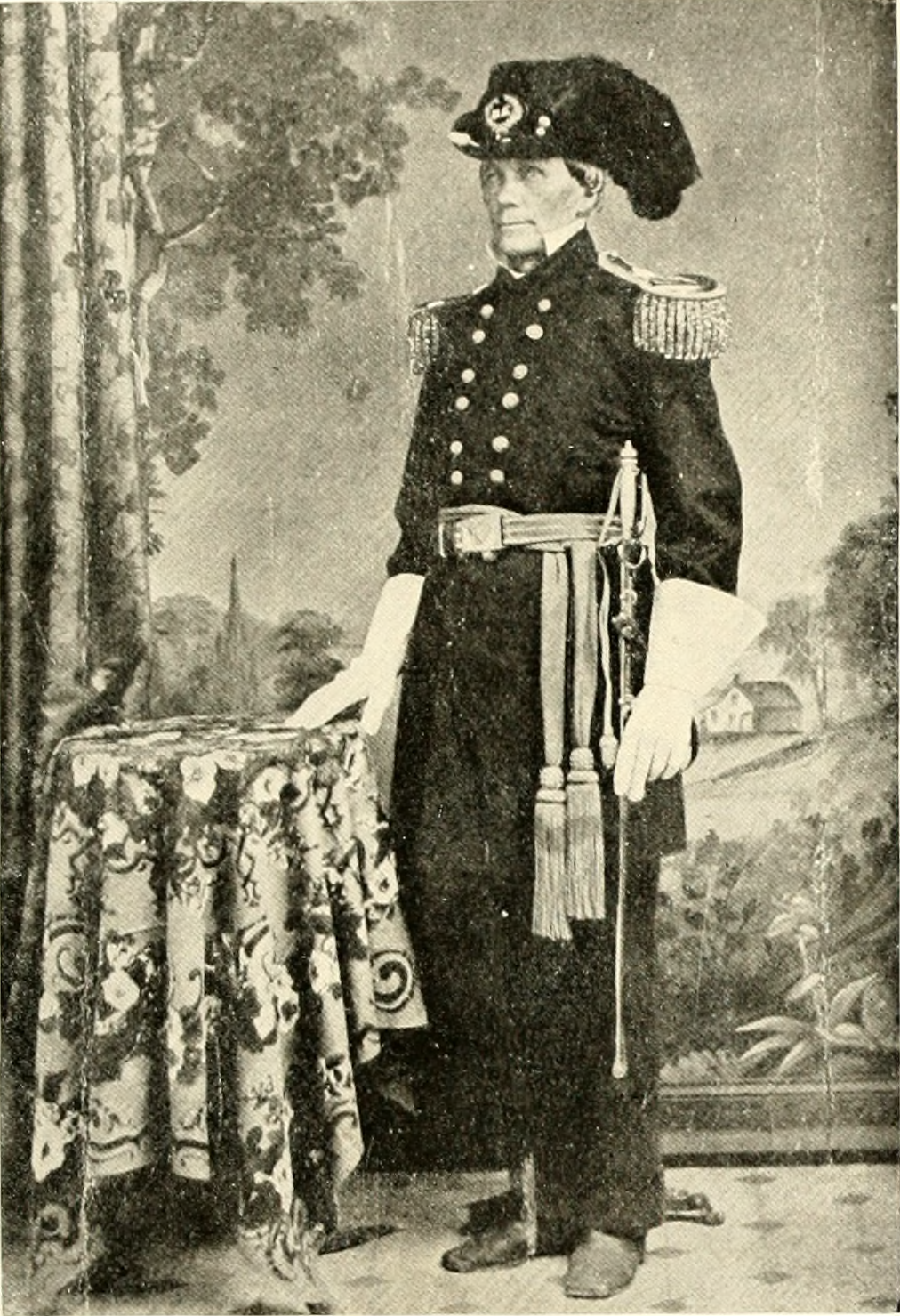

In 1863, after Coffin provided a steamboat for sending troops up the Columbia River to fight in the Yakima War, Oregon Governor Addison Gibbs made him a brigadier general in the state militia.

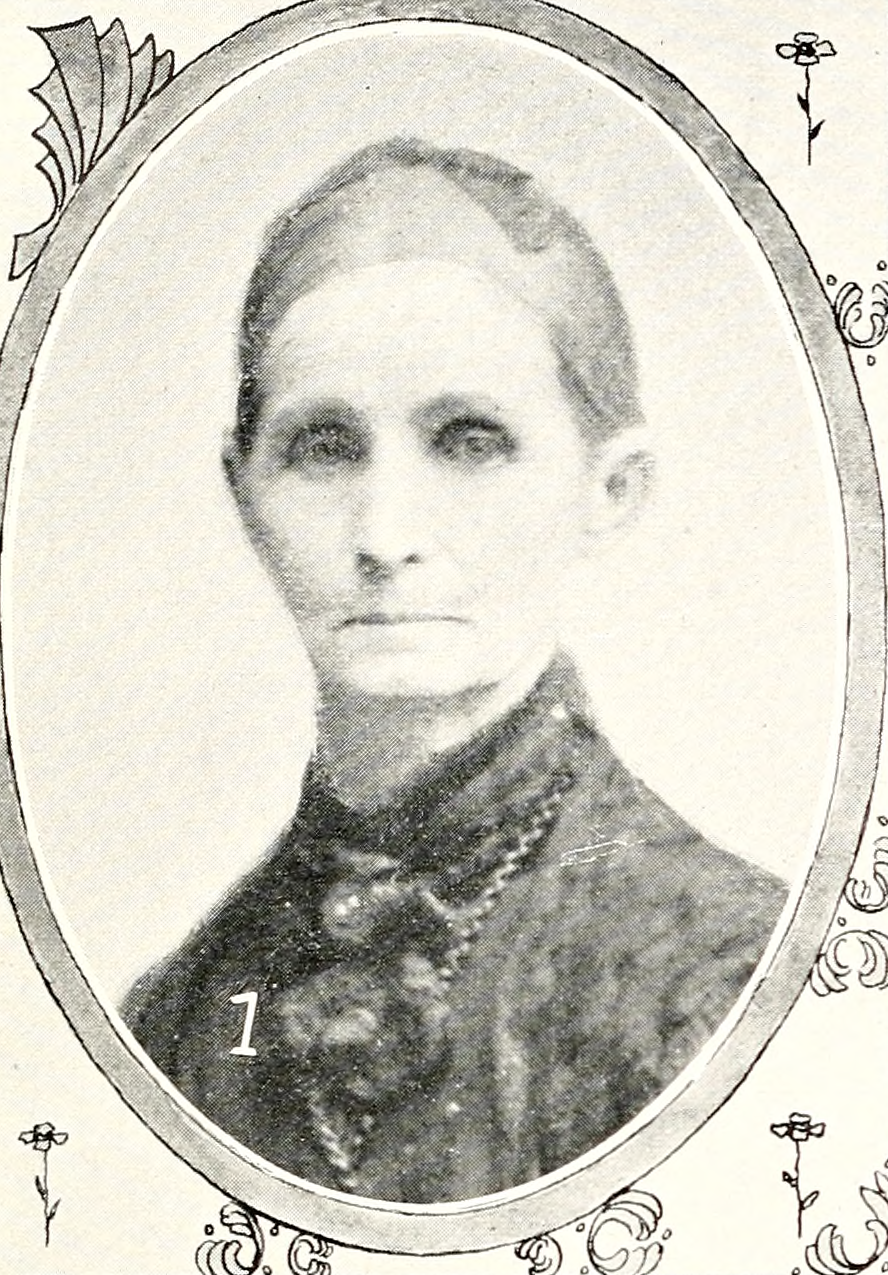
Stephen's wife Lucina lived into her nineties. This portrait was published in Gaston's Portland, Oregon, Its History and Builders, vol. 1.

Coffin donated land to Portland's Methodist Episcopal Church for construction of a boys academy and a girls seminary. He and his wife also donated land to the public in 1871, including seven park blocks and several acres along the river at Jefferson Street for a public levee.

Coffin died in Dayton, Oregon, on March 16, 1882.
