= Portland Garden Club =

Historic building in Portland, Oregon, U.S.

- U.S. National Register of Historic Places
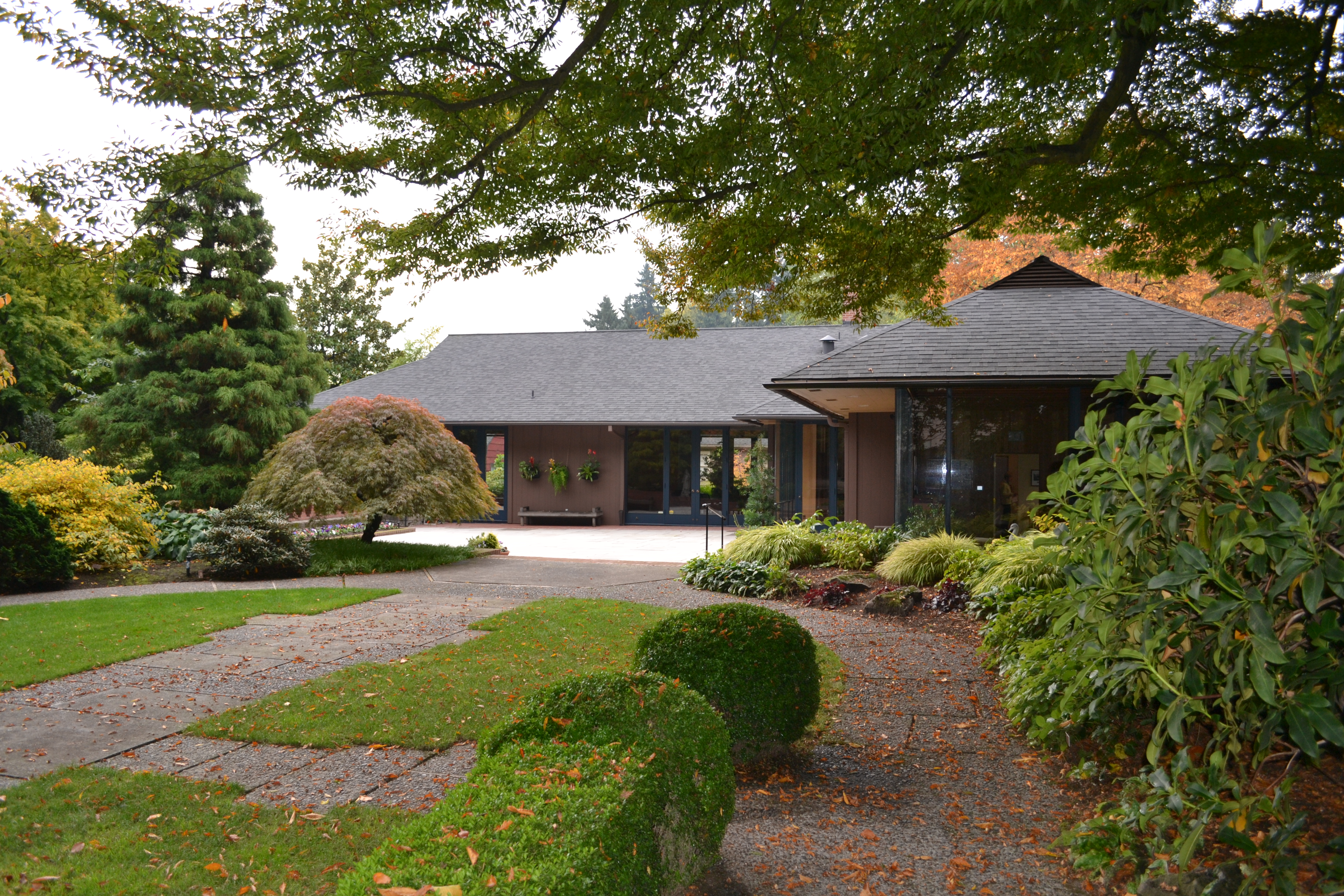
- The Portland Garden Club in 2011.

- Location within Portland, Oregon Location within Oregon Location within the United States
- Location: 1132 SW Vista Avenue; Portland, Oregon
- Coordinates: 45°31′12″N 122°41′52″W
- Built: 1954
- Architect: John W. Storrs
- Architectural style: Modern Movement
- Part of: King's Hill Historic District (Note: Although the Portland Garden Club is located within the boundaries of the King's Hill Historic District, it was listed as a noncontributing resource in the historic district when King's Hill was listed on the National Register in 1991. The Garden Club was not added to the National Register until 14 years later.) (ID91000039)
- NRHP reference No.: 05001151
- Added to NRHP: October 7, 2005

The Portland Garden Club is a historic building located in Portland, Oregon, United States. It was listed on the National Register of Historic Places in 2005.

== See also ==
- National Register of Historic Places listings in Southwest Portland, Oregon
