= Goose Hollow/SW Jefferson St station =

Light rail station in Portland, Oregon, U.S.

Goose Hollow/ SW Jefferson St
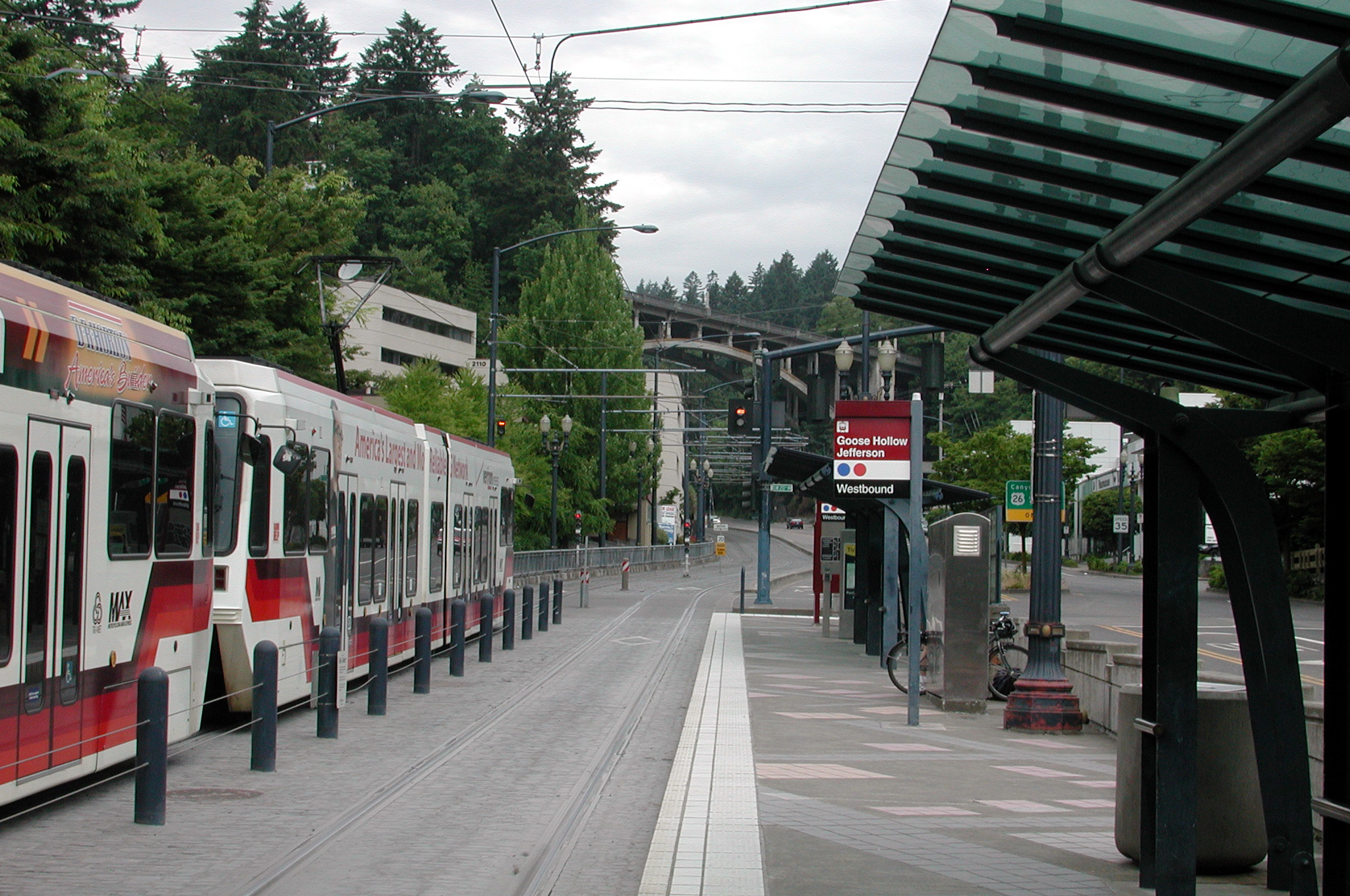
- Looking west toward the Vista Bridge, which is served by Line 51.

General information
- Location: SW 18th Ave & Jefferson St; Portland, Oregon; US
- Coordinates: 45°31′06″N 122°41′34″W
- Owner: TriMet
- Platforms: 2 side platforms
- Tracks: 2
- Connections: TriMet: 6, 19, others nearby

Construction
- Accessible: yes

History
- Opened: September 12, 1998

Services
Preceding station	TriMet	Following station
Washington Park toward Hatfield Government Center	Blue Line	Providence Park toward Cleveland Ave
Washington Park toward Hillsboro Airport/Fairgrounds	Red Line	Providence Park toward Portland Airport
Former services
Preceding station	TriMet	Following station
Washington Park toward Hatfield Government Center	Blue Line 1998–2020	Kings Hill/Southwest Salmon Street (closed) toward Cleveland Ave
Washington Park toward Hillsboro Airport/Fairgrounds	Red Line 2001–2020	Kings Hill/Southwest Salmon Street (closed) toward Portland Airport
Location

Goose Hollow/Southwest Jefferson Street is a light rail station on the MAX Blue and Red Lines in the Goose Hollow neighborhood of Portland, Oregon. It is the third stop westbound on the Westside MAX alignment and makes several cameo appearances in the movie What the Bleep Do We Know!? as the stop where Marlee Matlin's character boards the train to get into town.

== Location ==
Goose Hollow/SW Jefferson Street station is located in the Goose Hollow neighborhood of western Portland. Specifically, it is located on the southern side of SW Jefferson Street, across from the Goose Hollow Inn formerly owned by the late Bud Clark, former mayor of Portland. To the east of the station, the tracks curve through Collins Circle, a roundabout at the junction of SW Jefferson and SW 18th Streets. Trains turn north onto 18th as they move eastbound; to the west, the tracks pass under the Vista Avenue viaduct (more commonly referred to as the Vista Bridge) and into the Robertson Tunnel under Portland's West Hills.

== Station layout ==
The station uses a simple side platform layout with two tracks running between them. Access to the platforms is via the street with ramps on either end of each platform. There is also a crossing for pedestrians to change platforms.

== Bus connections ==
This station at Collins Circle is served by the following bus lines:

- 6 – Martin Luther King Jr Blvd
- 19 – Glisan/Canyon Rd
- Others nearby, as well as night MAX buses
