= Stratton–Cornelius House =

Historic building in Portland, Oregon, U.S.

- U.S. National Register of Historic Places
- U.S. Historic district – Contributing property
- Portland Historic Landmark
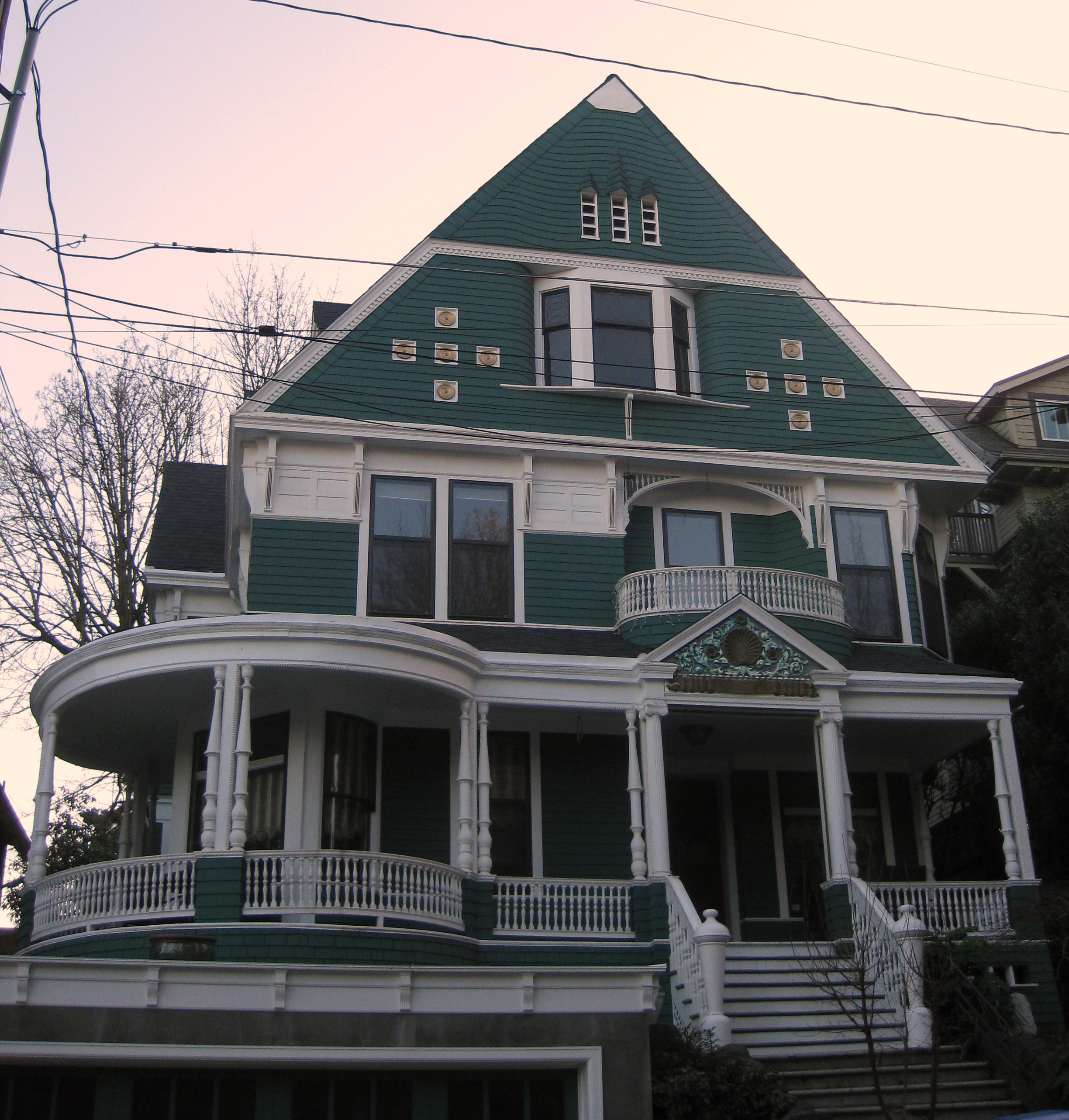
- The Stratton–Cornelius House in 2010

- Location within Portland, Oregon
- Location: 2182 SW Yamhill Street; Portland, Oregon
- Coordinates: 45°31′20″N 122°41′47″W
- Built: 1891
- Architectural style: Queen Anne
- Part of: King's Hill Historic District (ID91000039)
- NRHP reference No.: 78002322
- Added to NRHP: March 8, 1978

The Stratton–Cornelius House is a historic house, located in Portland, Oregon, United States. It is listed on the National Register of Historic Places, and is also listed as a contributing resource in the National Register-listed King's Hill Historic District.
