= William and Annie MacMaster House =

Historic building in Portland, Oregon, U.S.

- U.S. National Register of Historic Places
- U.S. Historic district – Contributing property
- Portland Historic Landmark
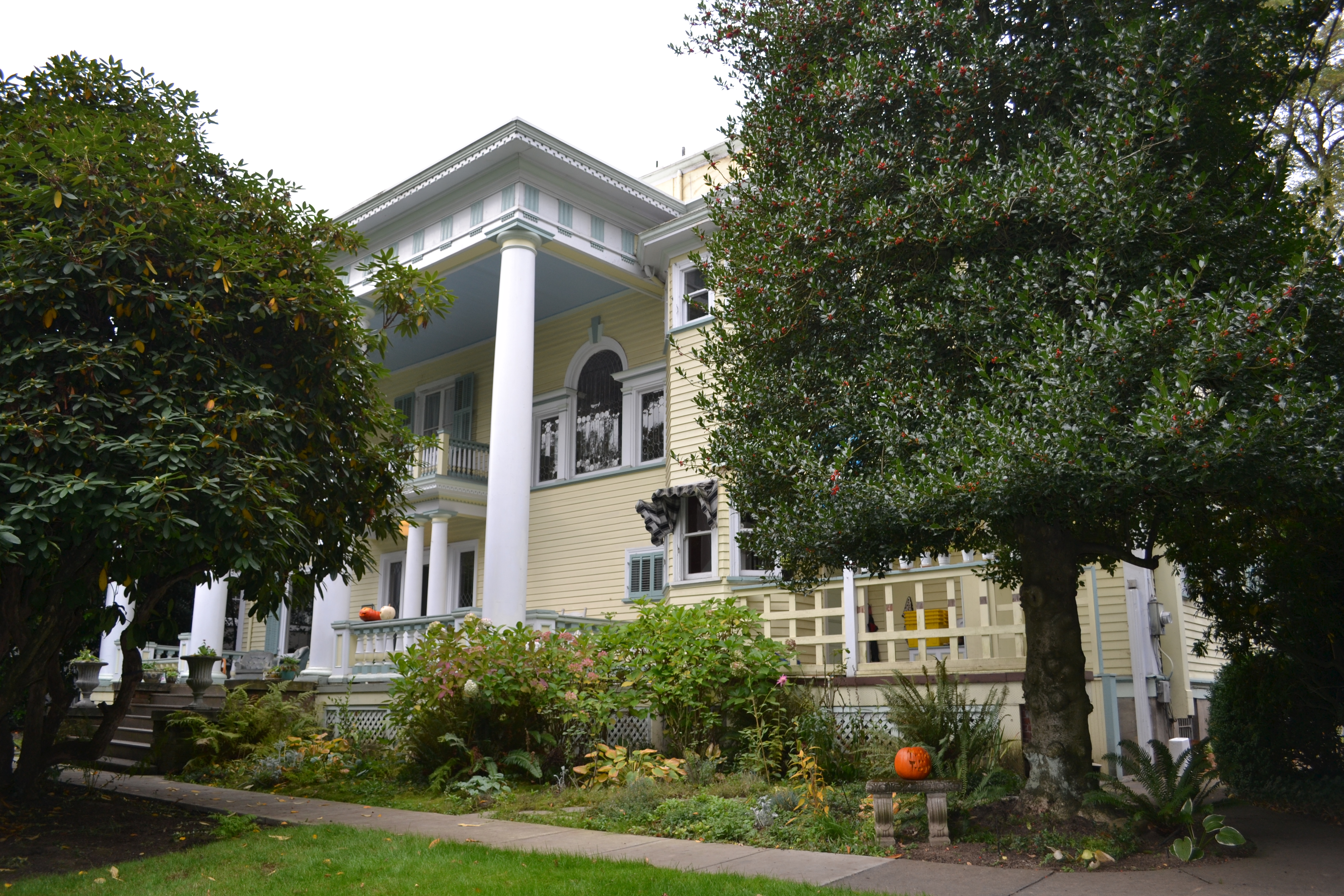
- The MacMaster House in 2011.

- Location within Portland, Oregon
- Location: 1041 SW Vista Avenue; Portland, Oregon
- Coordinates: 45°31′13″N 122°41′43″W
- Area: 0.3 acres (0.12 ha)
- Built: 1895
- Architect: Whidden & Lewis
- Architectural style: Colonial Revival
- Part of: King's Hill Historic District (ID91000039)
- NRHP reference No.: 89001862
- Added to NRHP: October 30, 1989

The William and Annie MacMaster House is a house located in southwest Portland, Oregon listed on the National Register of Historic Places.

== See also ==
- National Register of Historic Places listings in Southwest Portland, Oregon
