= Envoy Apartment Building =

Historic building in Portland, Oregon, U.S.

- U.S. National Register of Historic Places
- U.S. Historic district – Contributing property
- Portland Historic Landmark
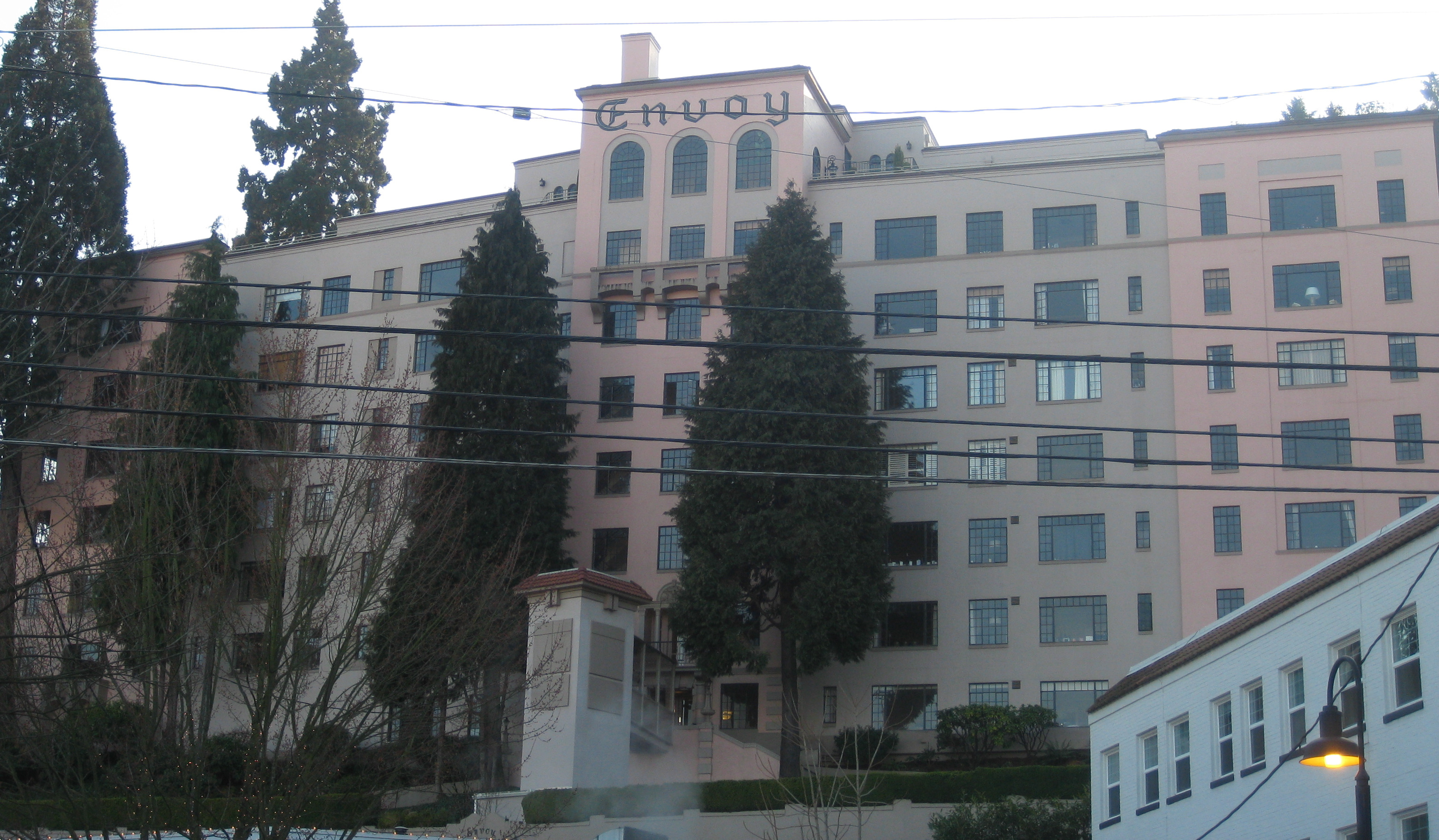
- The Envoy Apartment Building in 2010.

- Location within Portland, Oregon Location within Oregon Location within the United States
- Location: 2336 SW Osage Street; Portland, Oregon
- Coordinates: 45°31′23″N 122°42′00″W
- Built: 1929
- Architect: Carl L. Linde
- Architectural style: Late 19th And 20th Century Revivals, Mediterranean
- Part of: King's Hill Historic District (ID91000039)
- NRHP reference No.: 88000093
- Added to NRHP: March 3, 1988

The Envoy Apartment Building is a building located in southwest Portland, Oregon listed on the National Register of Historic Places. The building was originally apartments but was converted into condominiums in 2004.

== See also ==
- National Register of Historic Places listings in Southwest Portland, Oregon
