= Durham–Jacobs House =

Historic building in Portland, Oregon, U.S.

- U.S. National Register of Historic Places
- U.S. Historic district – Contributing property
- Portland Historic Landmark
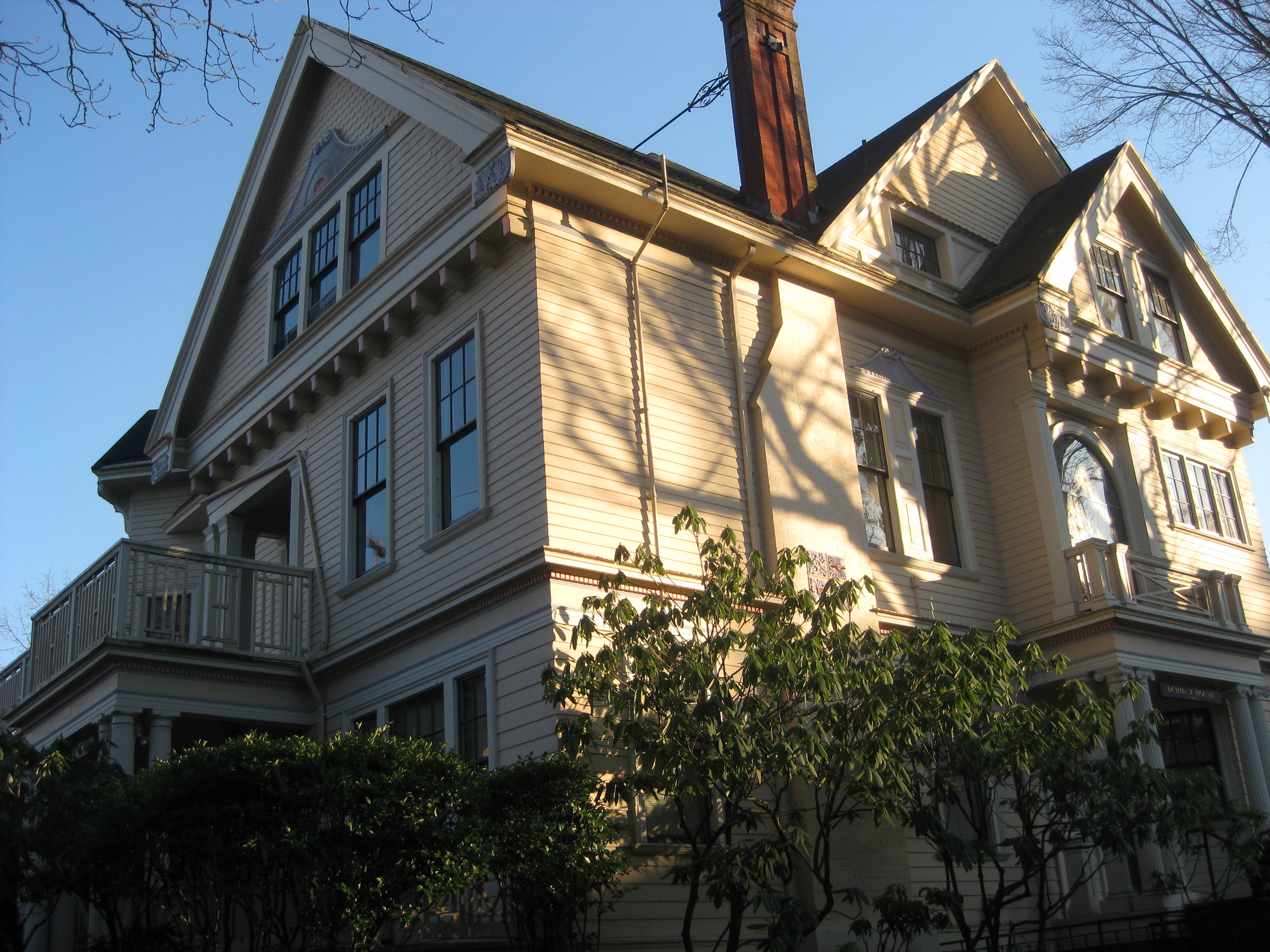
- Durham–Jacobs House in 2010

- Location within Portland, Oregon
- Location: 2138 SW Salmon Street; Portland, Oregon
- Coordinates: 45°31′15″N 122°41′43″W
- Built: 1890
- Architectural style: Queen Anne
- Part of: King's Hill Historic District (ID91000039)
- NRHP reference No.: 87000307
- Added to NRHP: March 6, 1987

The Durham–Jacobs House is a house located in southwest Portland, Oregon listed on the National Register of Historic Places.

== See also ==
- National Register of Historic Places listings in Southwest Portland, Oregon
