= Tanner Creek =

- Location of the mouth of Tanner Creek in Oregon
- Etymology: After a tannery built along the creek by Daniel Lownsdale in 1845.

Location
- Country: United States
- State: Oregon
- County, city: Multnomah County, Portland

Physical characteristics
- Source
  - location: Tualatin Mountains (West Hills)
  - coordinates: 45°30′32″N 122°43′55″W
- Mouth: Couch Lake (Willamette River)
  - location: Oregon
  - coordinates: 45°31′09″N 122°40′54″W

Tanner Creek is a small tributary of the Willamette River in Portland in the U.S. state of Oregon. Named after a tannery owned by one of the city's founders, it begins in what is now the Sylvan–Highlands neighborhood in the Tualatin Mountains (West Hills) west of downtown. In the 19th century the creek flowed on the surface, running northeast across the city, past what later became Providence Park and into a shallow lake (Couch Lake) and wetlands in what became the Pearl District, bordering the river.

Late in the century, the city began re-routing Tanner Creek and other West Hills streams into combined sewers and filling their former channels and basins to make flat land for homes and businesses. In the 21st century, Tanner Creek is nearly invisible, flowing through a conduit (but not a combined sewer) that empties into the Willamette at Outfall 11, near the Broadway Bridge. Structures along the former course of the creek include Vista Bridge and Tanner Springs Park as well as Providence Park.

== Names ==
Daniel Lownsdale, an early Portland settler and one of Portland's founders, built a tannery along the creek in 1845. The creek was named for the tannery.

Canyon Road, important to Portland's early development, was built along Tanner Creek canyon. First opened in 1849, the road connected Portland to the Tualatin Valley. Lownsdale was the surveyor on an improved version, a plank road, two years later, which began near the future site of the Portland Art Museum.

Couch Lake was named for John H. Couch, another early settler and one of the city's founders. Couch built a home on the west side of the lake.

== On the surface ==
The creek's headwaters lie in what is now the Sylvan–Highlands neighborhood in the Tualatin Mountains (West Hills) west of downtown. The creek flowed down the canyon that now accommodates Southwest Jefferson Street and Canyon Road (U.S. Highway 26). Its course continued across the site of the later Civic Stadium (Providence Park) and down a ravine. The ravine or gulch was up to 50 feet (15 m) deep in places and as wide in places as several city blocks. Vista Bridge in the Goose Hollow neighborhood crosses a remnant of the Tanner Creek gulch. Pavement markers near Providence Park indicate the creek's former course in that vicinity.

The creek emptied into Couch Lake, near today's Union Station. The lake, which no longer exists, was up to 15 feet (4.6 m) deep and covered 22 city blocks. In 1888, after the Northern Pacific Terminal Company bought the lake, it began filling it with sand and ship ballast.

== Underground ==
Between 1887 and 1891, the City of Portland built a Tanner Creek combined sewer to carry the creek as well as storm runoff and sewage from the West Hills and its homes to the river. Constructed in three stages, the sewer, about 6 feet (1.8 m) in diameter, was at that time "one of the largest trunk sewers ever built by the city." In 1904, the sewer collapsed near the Multnomah Athletic Club and flooded property downhill. Investigation of the subsequent sewer reconstruction and repair led to a scandal during the administration of Mayor George Henry Williams and to the firing of the city engineer and chief deputy city engineer on grounds "that they had a part in a general conspiracy to slight the work." The Tanner Creek trunk sewer ran from Southwest Taylor Street to the river near the intersection of Front Avenue and Pettygrove Street.

== 21st century ==
Tanner Springs Park, at Northwest 10th Avenue and Marshall Street, commemorates the creek. Opened on land acquired in 2003, it is an "urban waterscape" built on fill that rises 20 feet (6 m) higher than the former lake surface. Although early plans included bringing the creek back to the surface, the wetlands in the park are not connected to Tanner Creek but depend mostly on recycled rainwater.

In 2006, the city completed a pipeline that removed Tanner Creek from the combined sewer system and carried the creek water directly into the Willamette. This was part of a much larger project designed to keep sewage from entering the river during storms. The outfall into the river is about a quarter-mile downstream of the Broadway Bridge and 11.4 miles (18.3 km) upstream of the Willamette's confluence with the Columbia River.

== See also ==
- List of rivers of Oregon
- West Side CSO Tunnel

== Works cited ==
- McArthur, Lewis A.; McArthur, Lewis L. (2003) [1928]. Oregon Geographic Names (7th ed.). Portland: Oregon Historical Society Press. ISBN 0-87595-277-1.
