= Press Blocks =

Mixed-use development in Portland, Oregon, U.S.

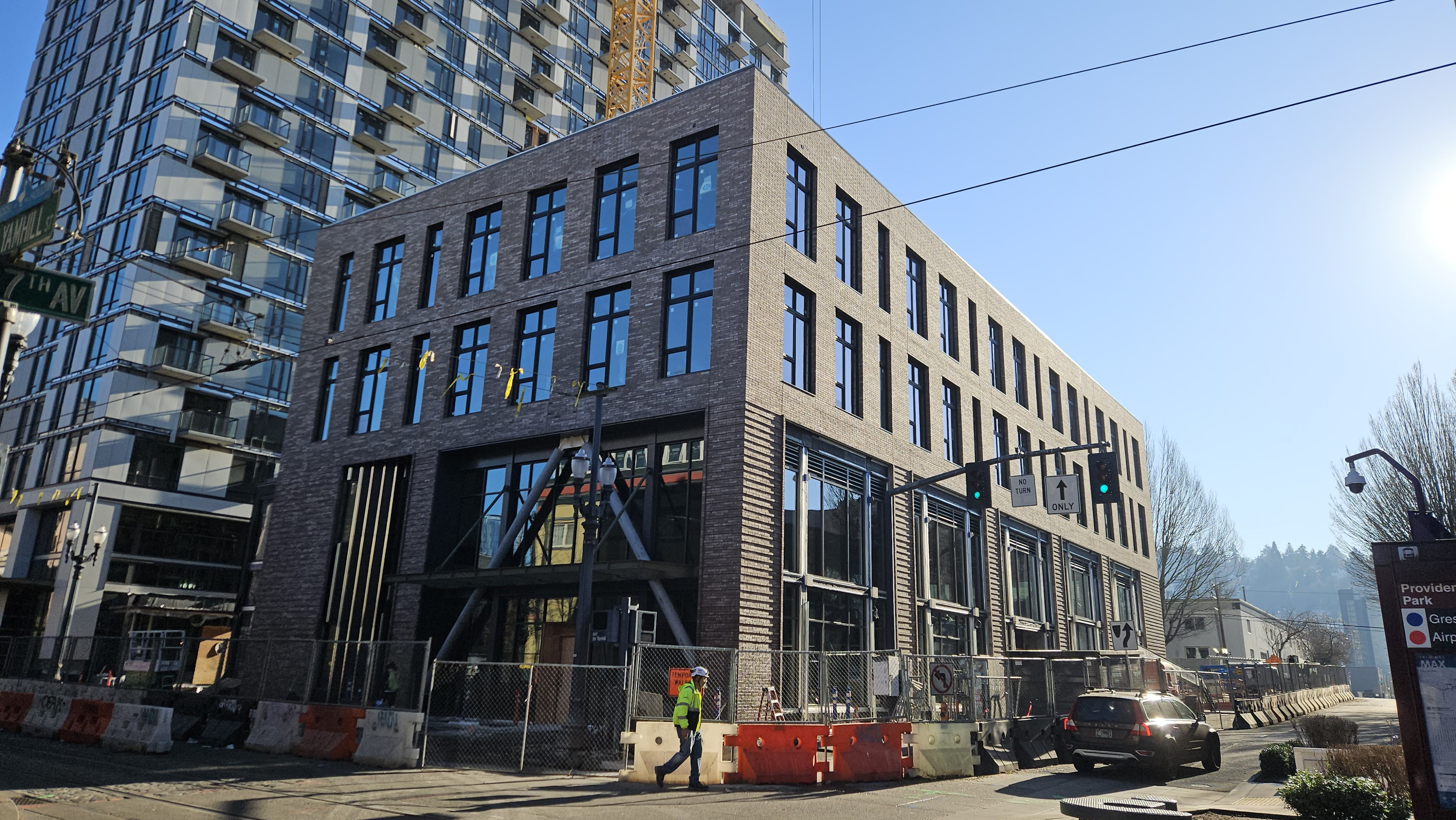
- Interactive map of the Press Blocks area

General information
- Status: Topped-out
- Location: Portland, Oregon, United States
- Coordinates: 45.520839°N 122.689703°W

The Press Blocks is a three-building, mixed-use development planned for Portland, Oregon's Goose Hollow neighborhood, in the United States. The $20 million purchase by Urban Renaissance Group and Security Properties closed in February 2017. Prior to construction of the new buildings, multiple buildings will be demolished, including one that formerly housed The Oregonian's printing press. The newspaper's parent company, Advance Publications, sold the property.

In March 2017, the Portland Design Commission rejected plans for the development, which had to be revised and resubmitted for approval.
