= Daniel H. Lownsdale =

American politician

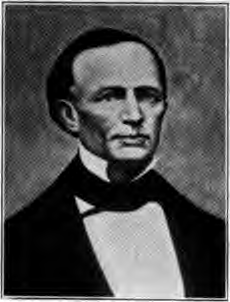
- Daniel Lownsdale

Legislator in the Provisional Government of Oregon
- In office 1846–1846
- Constituency: Tuality District

Personal details
- Born: 1803
- Died: 1862 (aged 58–59) Oregon
- Resting place: Lone Fir Cemetery, Portland, OR
- Occupation: Legislator, tanner

Daniel Lownsdale (1803–1862) was one of the founders of Portland, Oregon, United States.

Coming from Kentucky sometime before 1845, Lownsdale established the first tannery near the current location of Providence Park just west of downtown Portland. Tanner Creek, which flowed by the site during the mid-19th century, was named after the tannery. The creek was eventually rerouted to flow in pipes underground. In 2005 Tanner Springs Park was named for this creek.

Lownsdale served as a member of the Provisional Legislature of Oregon in 1846. Lownsdale purchased the land that would become downtown Portland on September 22, 1848. He resurveyed Portland, keeping the small blocks (200 feet per side, 64 feet streets), and adding the contiguous park blocks.

He became involved with a land dispute involving the authority of the laws from the Provisional Government with Josiah Lamberson Parrish. Lownsdale would defend the matter in court in a case that would progress through the Oregon Supreme Court and to the United States Supreme Court in Lownsdale v. Parrish, 62 U.S. 290 (1858).

His daughter Ruth Lownsdale married businessman and politician Eugene Semple.

Lownsdale is buried in the Lone Fir Cemetery in Portland. Lownsdale Square is named after him.
