= King's Hill Historic District =

Historic district in Portland, Oregon, U.S.

- U.S. National Register of Historic Places
- U.S. Historic district
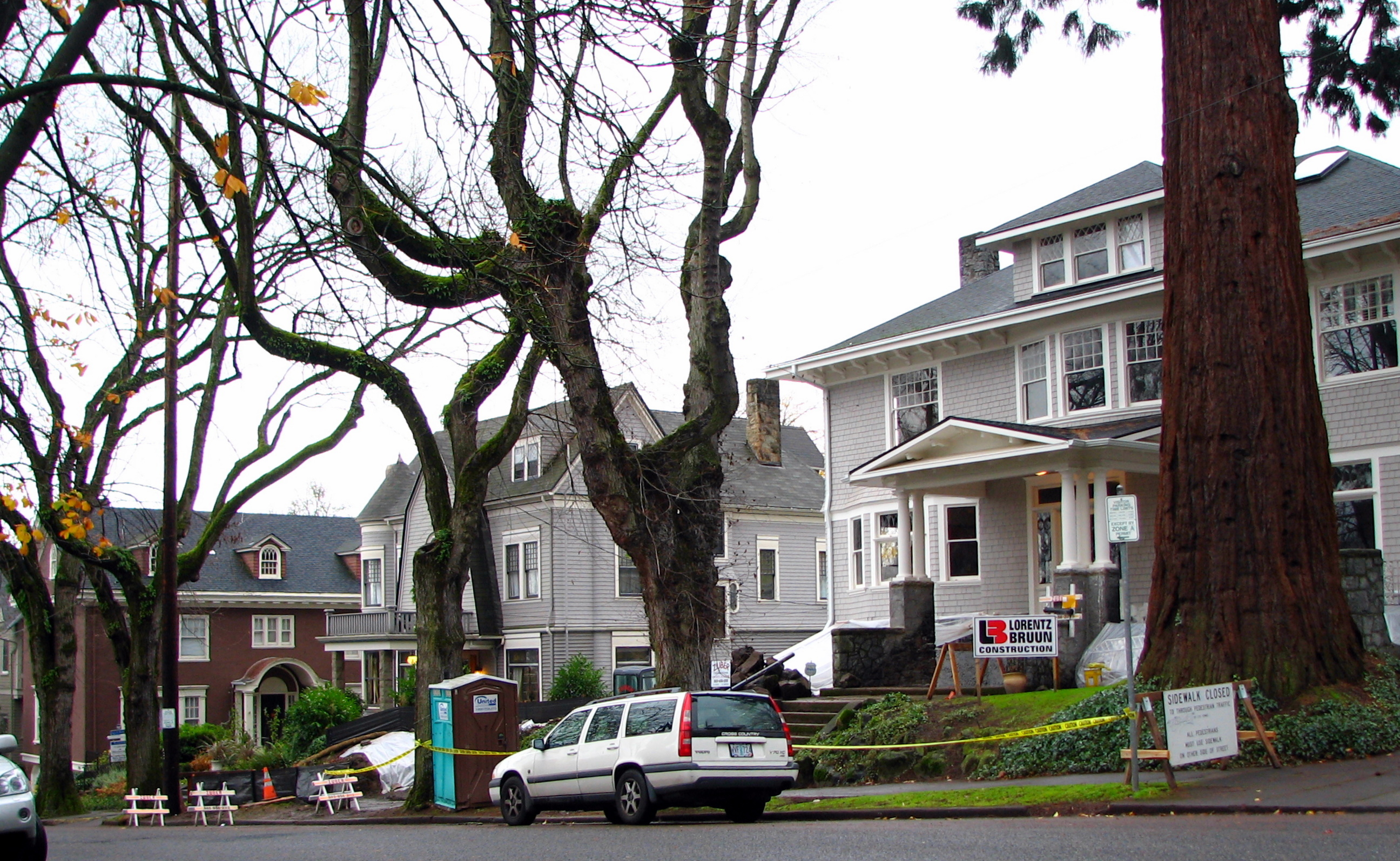
- Houses along SW Main Street in the historic district in 2009. From left to right: Williams Residence (1908), Blyth Residence (1901), Hoyt Residence (1904).

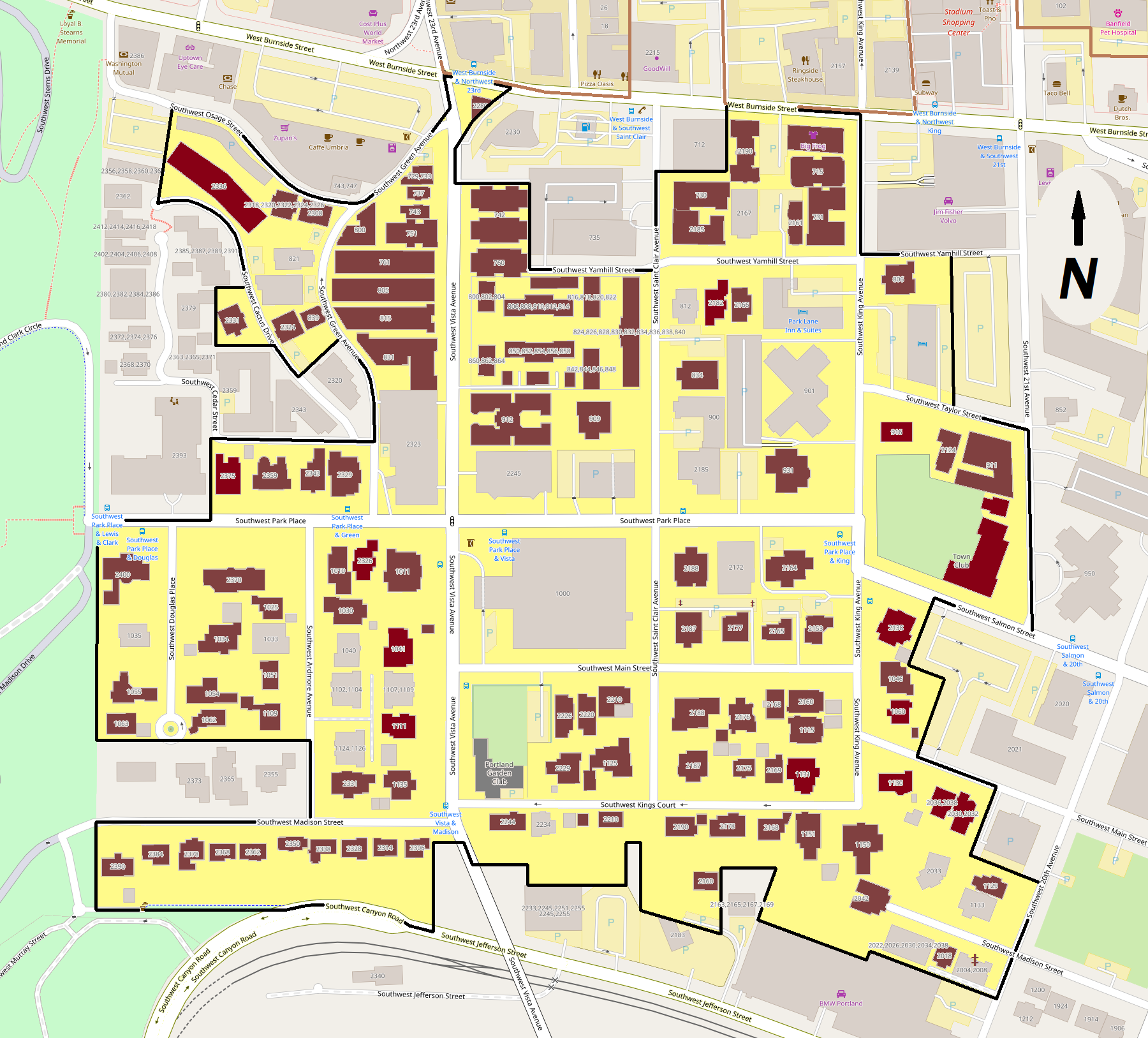
- Location: Portland, Oregon, roughly bounded by W Burnside Street, SW Canyon Road, SW 21st Avenue, and Washington Park
- Coordinates: 45°31′17″N 122°41′51″W
- Area: 43 acres (17 ha)
- Architect: Multiple
- Architectural style: Late 19th and Early 20th Century American Movements, Late 19th and 20th Century Revivals, Late Victorian
- NRHP reference No.: 91000039
- Added to NRHP: February 19, 1991

King's Hill Historic District, located in southwest Portland, Oregon, is listed on the National Register of Historic Places.

== See also ==
- Kings Hill / Southwest Salmon - station on the MAX Light Rail system
- National Register of Historic Places listings in Southwest Portland, Oregon
- Goose Hollow, Portland, Oregon
