= U.S. Route 28 =

Former numbered United States highway

U.S. Highway 28
- US 28 highlighted in red

Route information
- Maintained by Oregon State Highway Department
- Length: 462 mi (744 km)
- Existed: 1926–February 1, 1952

Major junctions
- West end: US 99 in Eugene
- US 20 in Sisters; US 97 in Redmond; US 395 from Mount Vernon to John Day
- East end: US 30 in Ontario

Location
- Country: United States
- State: Oregon

Highway system
- United States Numbered Highway System; List; Special; Divided; Oregon Highways; Interstate; US; State; Named; Scenic
← US 27	US	→ US 29
← OR 27	OR	→ US 30

U.S. Route 28 (US 28) was an east–west United States Numbered Highway that was located completely in the U.S. state of Oregon. It connected US 99 in Eugene with US 30 in Ontario. It existed from 1926 to 1952.

== History ==
In 1937, US 28 was truncated from Florence to Eugene, which then became its western terminus. US 28 was replaced with US 26 when US 26 was extended from Wyoming to the Pacific Ocean in 1952. The portion of US 28 from Ontario to Prineville became US 26. That highway then continued in a northwesterly direction to Portland and Astoria. From Prineville to Eugene, US 28 became US 126, now known as Oregon Route 126 (OR 126).

== Route description ==
US 28 began at US 99 in Eugene before continuing to Sisters and Redmond, where the route met US 97. Continuing east, the highway traveled concurrently with US 395 between Mount Vernon and John Day.

At the intersection with OR 126, the old designation of US 28 follows US 26 and picks up the Ochoco Highway No. 41, which also follows OR 126 west to US 97 in Redmond. The Ochoco Highway ends at OR 19 near Dayville, from which US 28 followed the John Day Highway No. 5 through John Day to US 20 in Vale. The remainder of US 28 in Oregon overlapped US 20 on the Central Oregon Highway No. 7 to the Idaho state line.

== Major intersections ==
County	Location	mi	km	Destinations	Notes
Lane	Eugene	0	0.0	US 99	Western terminus
Deschutes	Sisters	91	146	US 20	
Deschutes	Redmond	111	179	US 97	
Crook	Prineville	130	210	OR 27	
Wheeler	Mitchell	183	295	OR 207 north	
Grant		215	346	OR 19 north	
Grant	Mount Vernon	245	394	US 395 north	West end of US 395 concurrency
Grant	John Day	253	407	US 395 south	East end of US 395 concurrency
Baker		303	488	OR 7 east	
Malheur	Vale	371	597	US 20 west	West end of US 20 concurrency
Malheur	Ontario	387	623	US 20 east	Eastern terminus; east end of US 20 concurrency
1.000 mi = 1.609 km; 1.000 km = 0.621 mi: Concurrency terminus
