= Clyde Holliday State Recreation Site =

State park in Grant County, Oregon, US

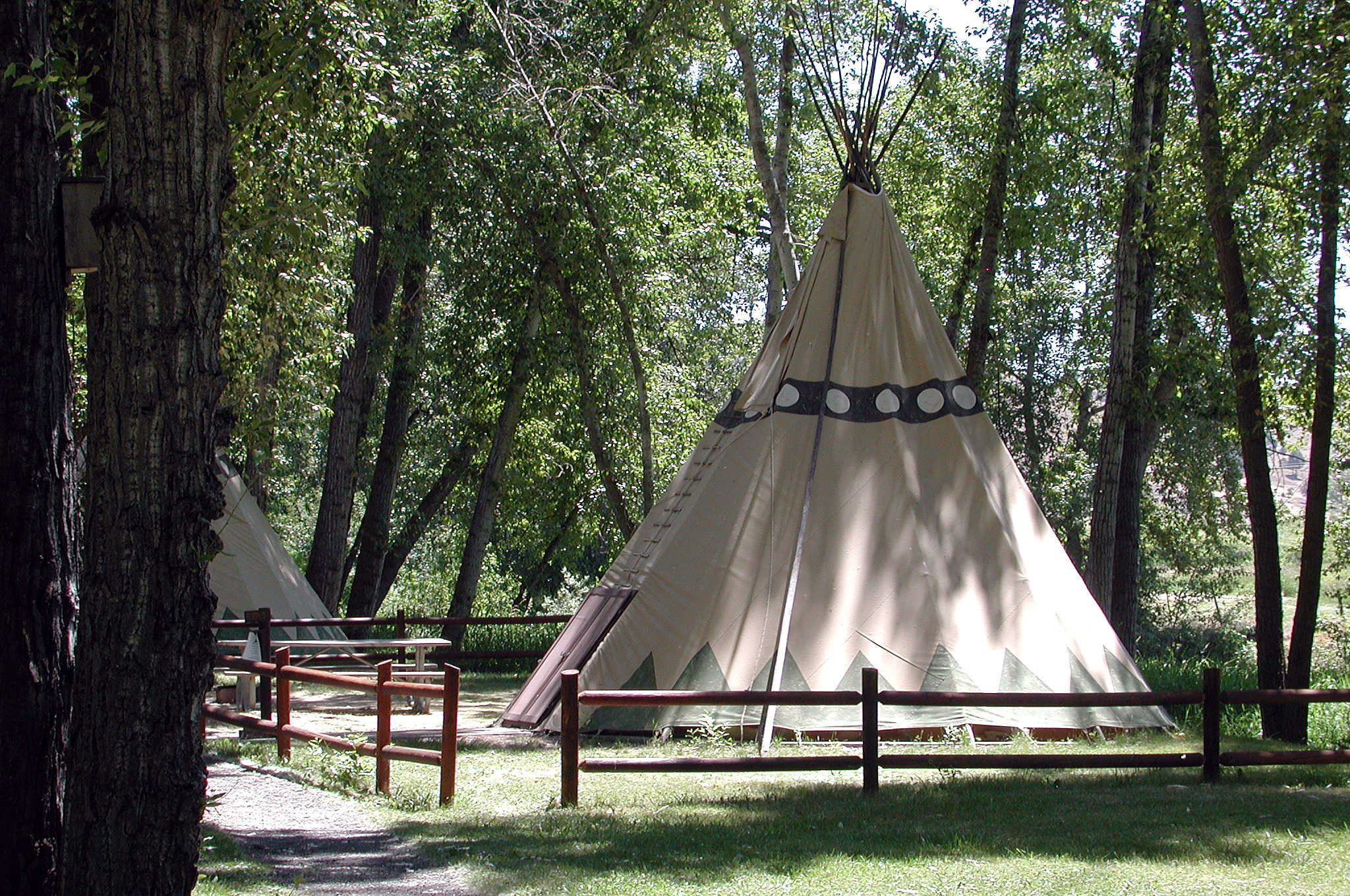

- Location within Oregon
- Interactive map of Clyde Holliday State Recreation Site
- Location: Grant County, Oregon, United States
- Coordinates: 44°24′59″N 119°05′18″W
- Area: 20 acres (8.1 ha)
- Elevation: 2,874 ft (876 m)
- Operator: Oregon Parks and Recreation Department
- Website: Clyde Holliday State Recreation Site

The Clyde Holliday State Recreation Site, part of the system of state parks managed by the Oregon Parks and Recreation Department, offers seasonal camping opportunities in a wooded tract along the John Day River near Mount Vernon. The park lies between U.S. Route 26 and the river and is 8 miles (13 km) west of the city of John Day.

Camping opportunities between March 1 and November 30 at the park include tenting, primitive camping, tepees, and recreational vehicles (RVs). Electric hookups, hot showers, flush toilets, and an RV dump station are available. Activities at the park include wildlife watching, fishing, horseshoes, picnics, music, and interpretive programs at an outdoor amphitheater.

== See also ==
- List of Oregon state parks
