= Oregon Highway 14 =

Oregon Highway 14 may refer to:

- For the former OR 14, see Oregon Route 14.
- For the unsigned Highway 14, see Crooked River Highway.
- For the former unsigned Highway 14, see Shaniko-Mitchell Highway.

== See also ==
- Oregon Highway 140
- Oregon Highway 141
