= Rose City Freeway =

The Rose City Freeway, also known as the Fremont Freeway, was a proposed freeway alignment through the Northeast sector of Portland, Oregon. The freeway's path would have begun at the I-5/I-405 interchange near the Fremont Bridge's east approach. From the elevated stack interchange, it would transition to grade, moving roughly northeast to Prescott Street. To establish a northern cross-town freeway belt, a second section of freeway was to follow NE Prescott Street east to I-205. Although functionally the same freeway, this section was going to be named the Prescott Freeway.

A successful freeway revolt surrounding the controversial St. Helens Freeway (I-505) and Mount Hood Freeway in the late 1970s impacted all Portland area freeway plans.

== Remnants ==
The present north I-405/I-5 interchange is actually an incomplete full stack interchange. A short section of freeway was built past the interchange which transitioned to grade. Ramp stubs exist which would have connected both northbound and southbound I-5 to the eastbound Rose City Freeway. Also the NB I-5 to SB I-405 ramp was built with enough clearance to allow installation of the extra ramps needed to make a full connection to the planned freeway. All of this was built along with the Fremont Bridge, which opened in 1973.

The unfinished freeway structure now serves as the Kerby Avenue exit on the Fremont Bridge's lower deck. Although removing the structure was once considered, nearby Legacy Emanuel Hospital lobbied to connect it to the surface street grid in order to have emergency access from the Fremont Bridge.

== See also ==
- Rose City Transit
