= U.S. Route 26 =

Numbered U.S. Highway in the United States

U.S. Route 26
- US 26 highlighted in red

Route information
- Length: 1,479 mi (2,380 km)
- Existed: 1926–present

Major junctions
- West end: US 101 near Seaside, OR
- I-5 at Portland, OR; I-84 at Boise, ID; I-15 at Idaho Falls, ID; I-25 at Casper, WY
- East end: I-80 / N-61 at Ogallala, NE

Location
- Country: United States
- States: Oregon, Idaho, Wyoming, Nebraska

Highway system
- United States Numbered Highway System; List; Special; Divided
← US 25	→ US 27

U.S. Highway 26 (US 26) is an east–west United States Numbered Highway that runs from Seaside, Oregon, to Ogallala, Nebraska. When the U.S. Numbered Highway System was first defined, it was limited to Nebraska and Wyoming; by the 1950s, it continued into Idaho and Oregon. The highway's eastern terminus is in Ogallala at an intersection with Interstate 80 (I-80). Its western terminus is south of Seaside at an intersection with US 101. Prior to 2004, the route's last 20 miles (32 km) were cosigned with US 101 from the highways' junction south of Seaside north to Astoria where its intersection with US 30 was also US 30's western terminus. Long segments of the highway follow the historic Oregon Trail. At its peak, immediately before the establishment of the Interstate Highway System, US 26 was 1,557 miles (2,506 km) in length and terminated in Astoria.

== Route description ==
Lengths
	mi	km
OR	472	760
ID	403	649
WY	475	764
NE	151	243
Total	1,479	2,380

=== Oregon ===
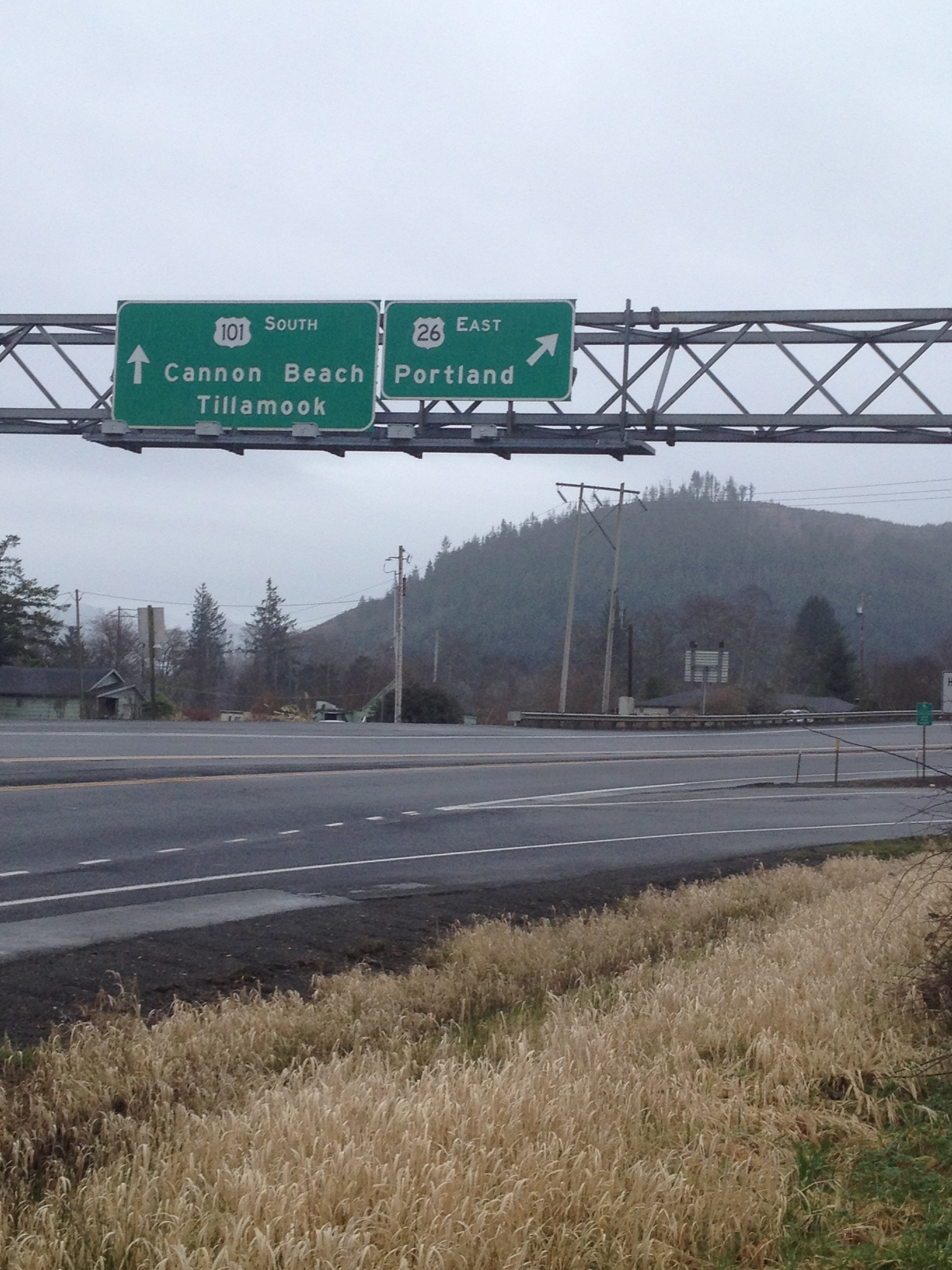
Start of US 26 in Oregon

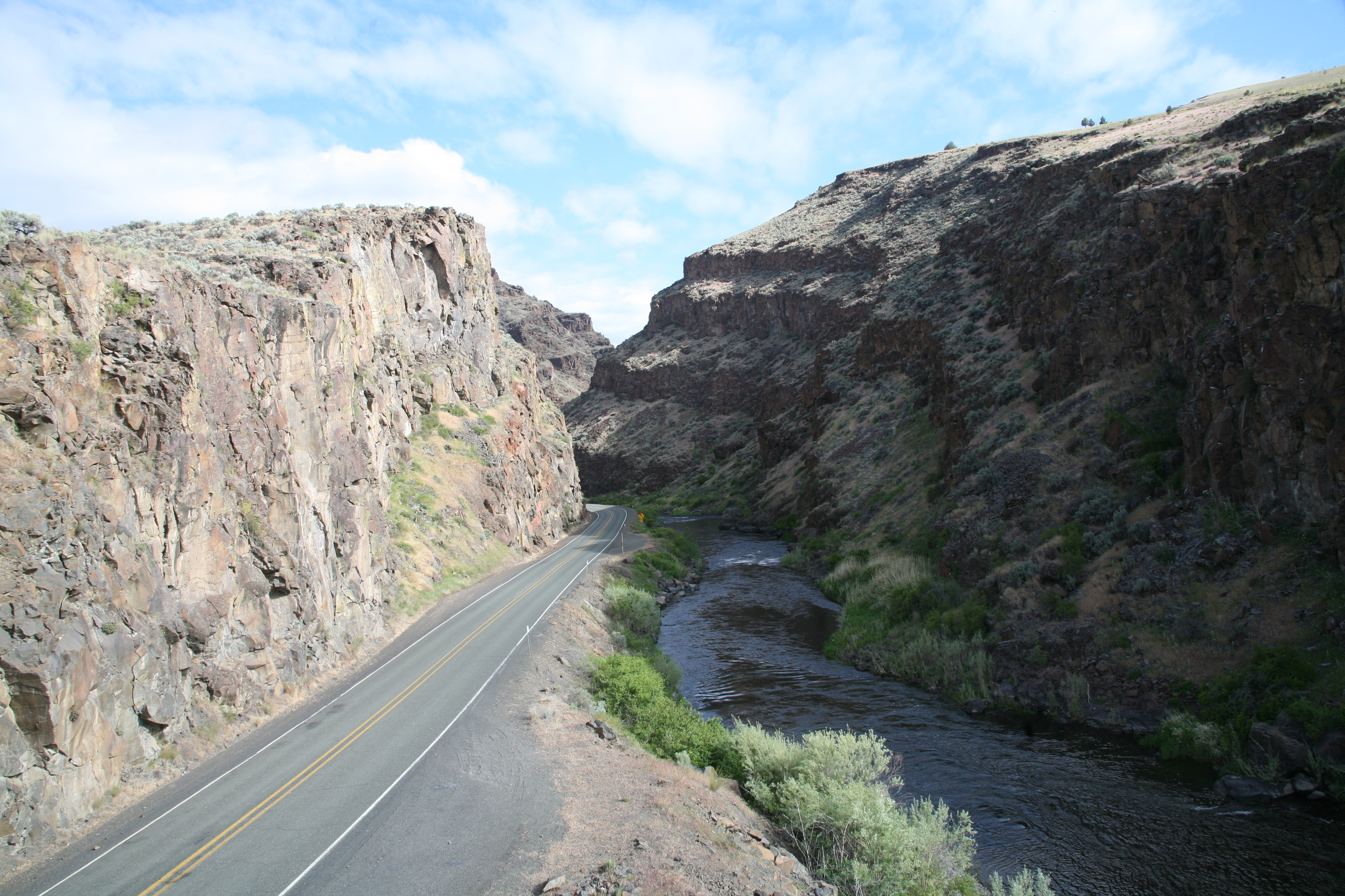
US 26 at the entrance to Picture Gorge in Eastern Oregon. The John Day River is to the right of the roadway.

Starting at a junction with US 101 near Seaside, US 26 heads southeast through the Coast Range to Portland. In the western Portland area, US 26 is a freeway known as the Sunset Highway. After passing through the Vista Ridge Tunnels, heading into Downtown Portland, it intersects with I-405 and runs along the Interstate southbound for about a half-mile (0.80 km) before exiting onto surface streets at the waterfront, meeting Oregon Route 43 (OR 43) at Macadam Avenue before crossing I-5. After crossing the Willamette River and meeting at an incomplete interchange with OR 99E, US 26 then heads east on Powell Boulevard where it crosses I-205 and continues east to Sandy on what is known as the Mount Hood Highway No. 26, a four-lane divided highway that was supposed to be the Mount Hood Freeway, which was never built just south of Division Street.

After passing through Sandy, US 26 (known there as the Mount Hood Highway) continues on toward Government Camp and Bennett Pass, where it eventually meets up with OR 35. The Mount Hood Highway continues north along OR 35, while US 26 heads southeast toward Madras, where it intersects with US 97. It then continues southeast to Prineville, where it meets OR 126 and heads east through John Day where it meets US 20 in Vale. The remainder of US 26 follows US 20 to the Idaho state line.

=== Idaho ===
From the Oregon state line, US 26 continues to follow US 20 to Boise, with short concurrencies with US 95 near Parma and I-84 at Caldwell. At Boise, US 26/US 20 merges with I-84 for about 40 miles (64 km) until Mountain Home, where US 20 splits from US 26/I-84. About 41 miles (66 km) later in Bliss, US 26 splits from I-84, joining US 93 at Shoshone with the concurrent routes joining US 20 at Carey. US 20/US 26/US 93 skirt the north edge of Craters of the Moon National Monument and Preserve and then through Arco where US 93 splits north. Near Idaho National Laboratory, US 26 again splits from US 20 to the southeast, proceeding to Blackfoot, where US 26 joins I-15 for about 20 miles (32 km) before splitting just south of Idaho Falls toward Alpine, Wyoming.

=== Wyoming ===
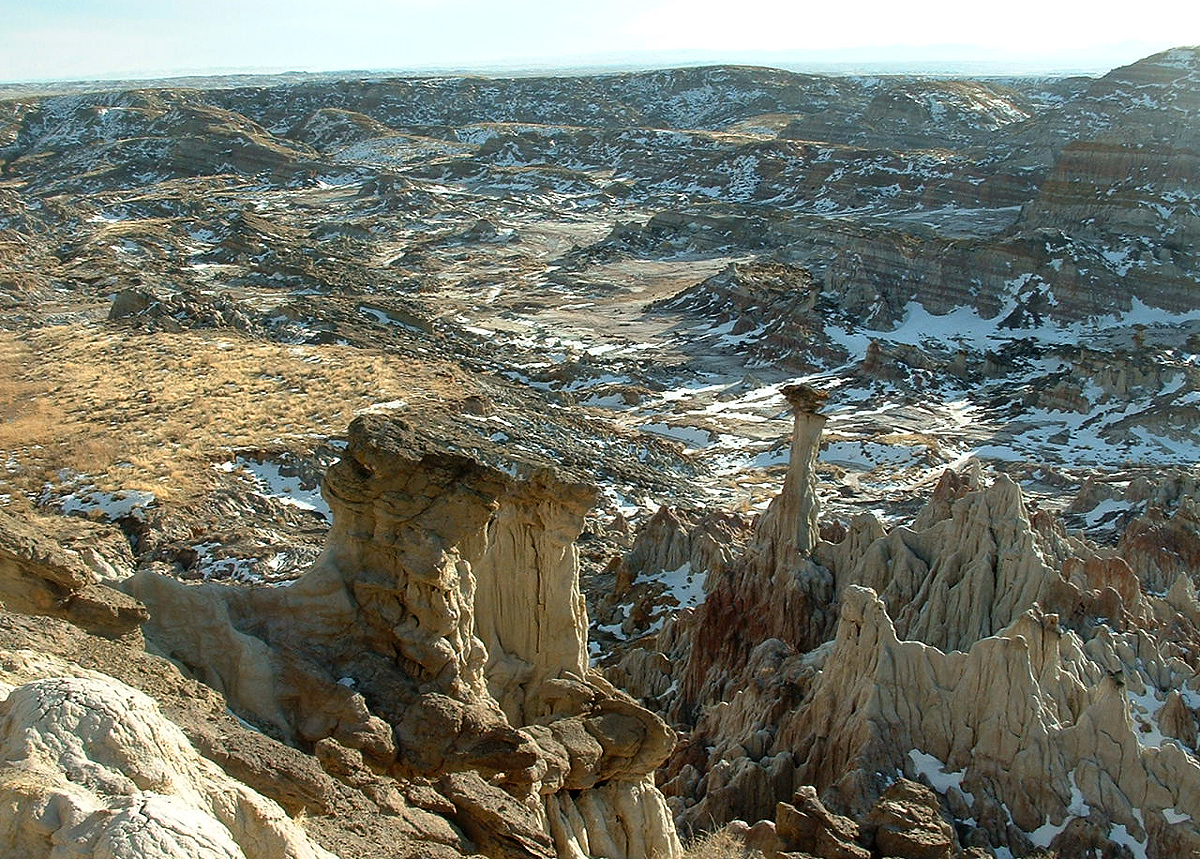
US 20/US 26 at the entrance to Hell's Half Acre (Wyoming)

From Alpine, US 26 is cosigned with US 89 east and north to Hoback Junction, then cosigned with US 89, US 189, and US 191 to Jackson. US 189 ends in Jackson, and the other three highways continue their concurrency through Grand Teton National Park up to Moran. At "Glacier View Turnout", a view of Teton Glacier, on the north of Grand Teton, can be seen. At Moran, US 26 turns east, concurrent with US 287. Crossing the Continental Divide at Togwotee Pass, US 26 passes through Dubois, the end of the Wyoming Centennial Scenic Byway, and at Diversion Dam Junction, US 26 and US 287 separate; US 26 continues southeast to Riverton, then northeast to Shoshoni. From Shoshoni to Casper, US 26 is cosigned with US 20. US 20/US 26 has a bypass north of Casper, the eastern half of which is concurrent with I-25 and US 87. US 20/US 26/US 87 parallels I-25 from Casper to Glenrock; east of Glenrock, US 26 (along with US 20 and US 87) is cosigned on I-25. US 26 follows I-25 to Dwyer Junction, where it turns east to continue along the Old Oregon Trail. US 26 passes through Guernsey, Fort Laramie, Lingle, and Torrington before entering Nebraska. US 85 is concurrent with US 26 between Lingle and Torrington.

=== Nebraska ===
US 26 runs southeastward parallel to the North Platte River. The largest city US 26 runs through in Nebraska is Scottsbluff, which is just 22 miles (35 km) from the Wyoming border. US 26 also goes past Chimney Rock National Historic Site. US 26 intersects with US 385 in Bridgeport and then continues to its eastern terminus in Ogallala, Nebraska at I-80. All told, there are 150.79 miles (242.67 km) of US 26 in the state of Nebraska.

== History ==
Between 1952 and 2003, US 26 ran concurrently with 101 from Seaside, Oregon up to Astoria, where it abruptly ended at the Astoria-Megler bridge. In 2003, this concurrency was truncated and US 26 now began just south of Seaside.

U.S. Highway 320
- Location: Shoshoni–Riverton, Wyoming
- Existed: 1926–1938

U.S. Highway 320 (US 320) was part of the initial 1926 system, connecting US 20 in Shoshoni with US 87W in Riverton, Wyoming. It became Wyoming Highway 320 (WYO 320) in 1938, which was extended southwest to Lander in 1940 when US 287 (which had replaced US 87W) was realigned. The original part of US 320/WYO 320 became part of an extension of US 26 in 1950, and the rest of WYO 320 became part of WYO 789 in 1954.

== Major intersections ==
Oregon
US 101 south of Seaside
I-405 in Portland. The highways travel concurrently through the city.
I-205 in Portland
US 97 in Madras. The highways travel concurrently through the city.
US 395 in Mount Vernon. The highways travel concurrently to John Day.
US 20 in Vale. The highways travel concurrently to Mountain Home.
Idaho
US 95 north-northwest of Parma. The highways travel concurrently to southeast of Parma.
I-84 / US 30 north of Caldwell. The highways travel concurrently to Caldwell.
I-184 in Boise. The highways travel concurrently through the city.
I-84 / US 30 in Boise. I-84/US 26 travel concurrently to Bliss. US 26/US 30 travel concurrently to west-northwest of Bliss.
US 93 in Shoshone. The highways travel concurrently to Arco.
US 20 in Carey. The highways travel concurrently to northwest of Atomic City.
I-15 in Blackfoot. The highways travel concurrently to Idaho Falls.
US 91 in Idaho Falls
Wyoming
US 89 on the Alpine Northwest–Alpine Northeast line. The highways travel concurrently to Moran.
US 189 / US 191 in Hoback Junction. US 26/US 189 travel concurrently to Jackson. US 26/US 191 travel concurrently to Moran.
US 287 in Moran. The highways travel concurrently to west-northwest of Morton.
US 20 in Shoshoni. The highways travel concurrently to Orin.
I-25 / US 87 on the Casper–Hartrandt city line. I-25/US 26 travel concurrently into Casper proper. US 26/US 87 travel concurrently to west-southwest of Dwyer.
I-25 southeast of Glenrock. The highways travel concurrently to west-southwest of Dwyer.
US 18 in Orin
US 85 in Lingle. The highways travel concurrently to Torrington.
Nebraska
US 385 in Bridgeport. The highways travel concurrently to Northport.
US 30 west of Ogallala. The highways travel concurrently to Ogallala.
I-80 in Ogallala. The roadway continues as N-61.

== See also ==
- List of United States Numbered Highways
- U.S. Route 126

Browse numbered routes
← SH-25	ID	→ SH-27
← N-25A	NE	→ N-27
← OR 22	OR	→ OR 27
← I-25	WY	→ WYO 26
