= Sunset Highway =

Sunset Highway may refer to:

- Sunset Highway (Oregon), the westernmost portion of U.S. Highway 26 in Oregon
- Sunset Highway (Washington), a.k.a. Primary State Highway 2
