= U.S. Route 26 in Oregon =

Section of U.S. Highway in Oregon, United States

U.S. Highway 26
- US 26 highlighted in red

Route information
- Maintained by ODOT
- Length: 471.56 mi (758.90 km)

Major junctions
- West end: US 101 near Seaside
- OR 217 in Beaverton I-405 in Portland; I-5 in Portland; I-205 in Portland; US 97 in Madras; OR 126 in Prineville; US 395 in John Day US 20 in Vale
- East end: US 20 / US 26 at the Idaho state line

Location
- Country: United States
- State: Oregon
- Counties: Clatsop, Tillamook, Columbia, Washington, Multnomah, Clackamas, Wasco, Jefferson, Crook, Wheeler, Grant, Baker, Malheur

Highway system
- United States Numbered Highway System; List; Special; Divided; Oregon Highways; Interstate; US; State; Named; Scenic
← OR 22	→ OR 27

U.S. Route 26 (US 26) is a major cross-state United States Numbered Highway with its western terminus in the U.S. state of Oregon, connecting US 101 on the Oregon Coast near Seaside with the Idaho state line east of Nyssa. Local highway names include the Sunset Highway No. 47, Mount Hood Highway No. 26, and John Day Highway No. 5 before continuing into Idaho and beyond.

== Route description ==
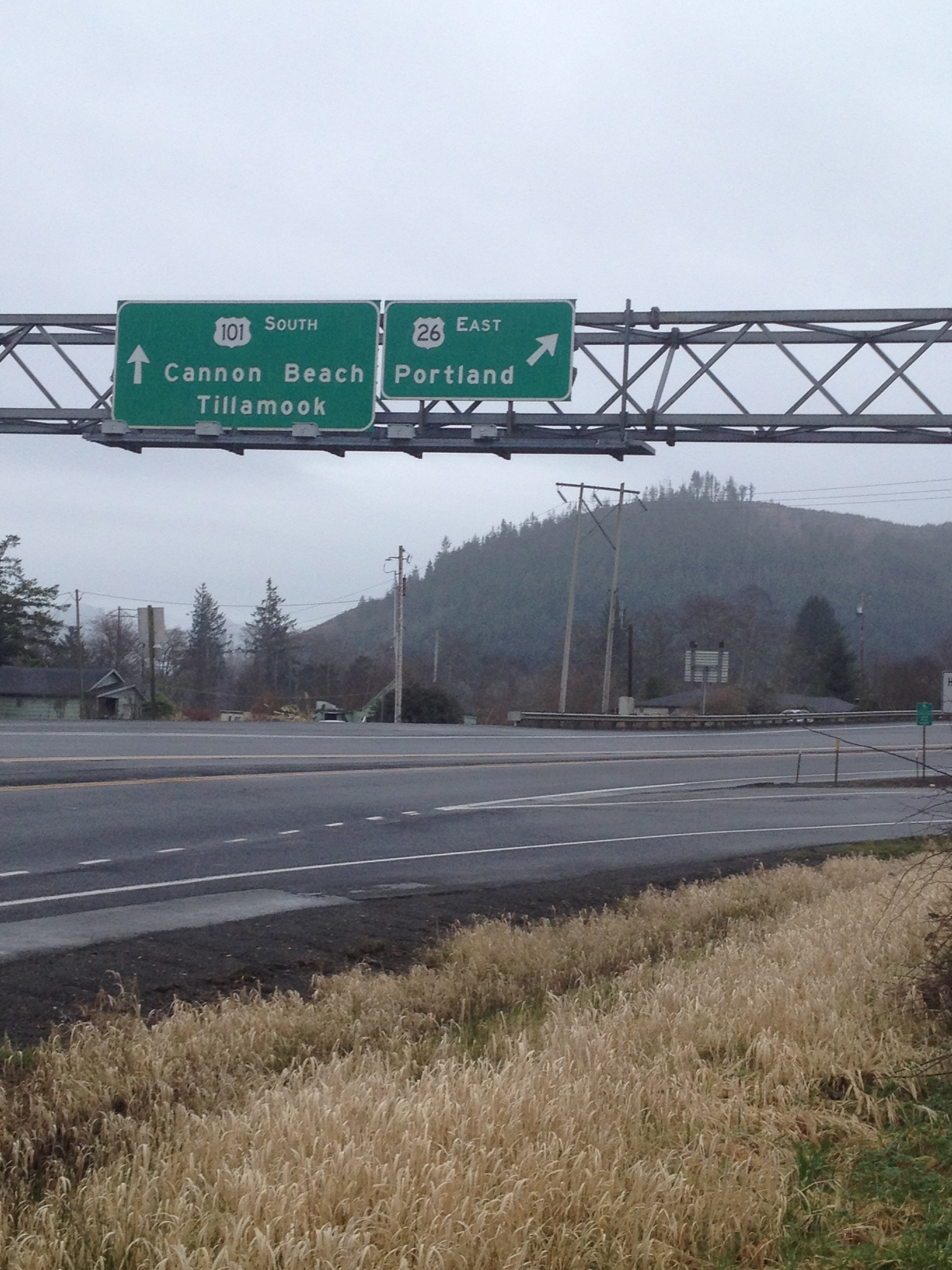
Start of US 26 in Oregon near Seaside

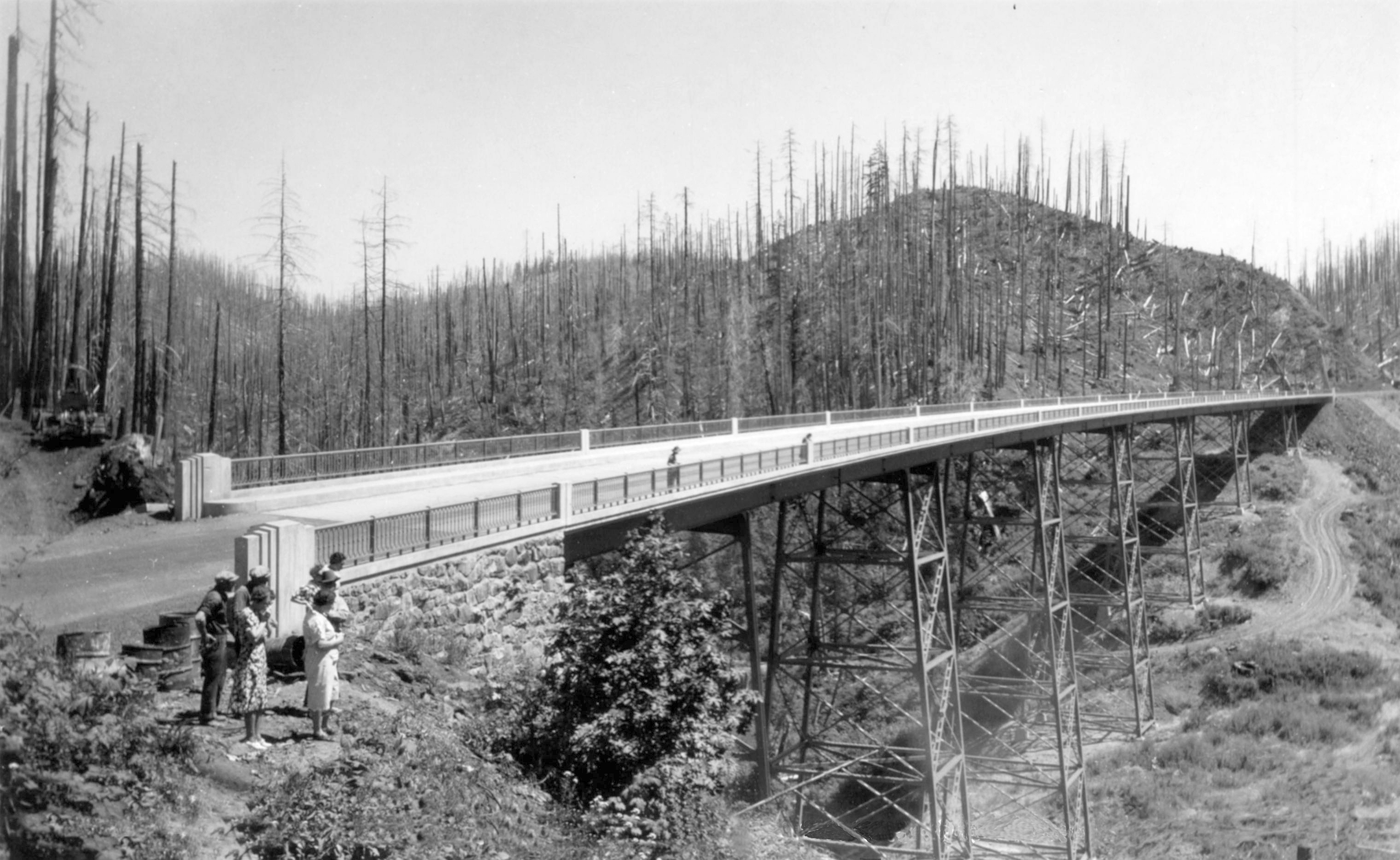
Quartz Creek Bridge in Clatsop County, 1944

The western terminus of the highway (and of US 26) is at an interchange with US 101 between Seaside and Cannon Beach. The highway heads east from there through the Oregon Coast Range, providing access to Saddle Mountain and passing through the valleys of the Necanicum and Nehalem rivers. It then crosses over the Oregon Coast Range, where it passes through the Dennis L. Edwards Tunnel, descending into the Tualatin Valley, into the community of Banks.

East of Banks, the highway merges with Oregon Route 6 (OR 6) and becomes a freeway, which passes through the high-tech regions of Washington County. The freeway enters the Portland metropolitan area in the northeast corner of Hillsboro, then passes through the northern part of the city of Beaverton and the communities of Cedar Hills and Cedar Mill near the intersection with the northern terminus of OR 217. Also at this point, MAX Light Rail is adjacent on the north side of the highway for nearly two miles (3.2 km) until it submerges into the Robertson Tunnel.

The highway enters the Portland city limits near the Sylvan-Highlands neighborhood, where it is also joined by OR 8; east of here, the highway descends a steep grade through a canyon which penetrates Portland's Tualatin Mountains; this stretch of the Sunset is coincident with Canyon Road. The highway skirts the southern edge of Portland's Washington Park, providing access to the Oregon Zoo and other attractions. At the bottom of the grade, the highway passes through the Vista Ridge Tunnels into Downtown Portland. Immediately east of the tunnel is an interchange with Interstate 405 (I-405); this interchange is the end of the Sunset Highway.

The Sunset Highway between the Sylvan-Highlands exit and the western portal of the Vista Ridge Tunnels

In Portland, the route overlaps I-405 (Stadium Freeway No. 61) for a short distance before exiting onto city streets, including Arthur Street, to reach the Ross Island Bridge. US 26 leaves the bridge, which is at the beginning of the Mount Hood Highway No. 26, and follows Powell Boulevard, a surface street, to Gresham.

An expressway begins near Gresham and carries US 26 southeast to near Sandy. From Sandy to near Government Camp and Bennett Pass, where US 26 intersects OR 35, it closely follows the historic Barlow Road through the Mount Hood Corridor, and is part of the Mount Hood Scenic Byway. The Mount Hood Highway branches off to the north along OR 35, and the Warm Springs Highway No. 53 carries US 26 southeast through Wapinitia Pass (where it crosses the Pacific Crest Trail), Blue Box Pass, the Warm Springs Indian Reservation, and Agency Plains to Madras. After a short overlap with US 97 (The Dalles-California Highway No. 4), the short Madras-Prineville Highway No. 360 continues southeast to a junction with OR 126 in Prineville.

At that junction, US 26 picks up the Ochoco Highway No. 41, which also follows OR 126 west to US 97 in Redmond. The Ochoco Highway ends at OR 19 near Dayville, from which US 26 follows the John Day Highway No. 5 through John Day to US 20 in Vale. The remainder of US 26 in Oregon overlaps US 20 on the Central Oregon Highway No. 7 to the Idaho state line.

== History ==
=== Before US 26 ===
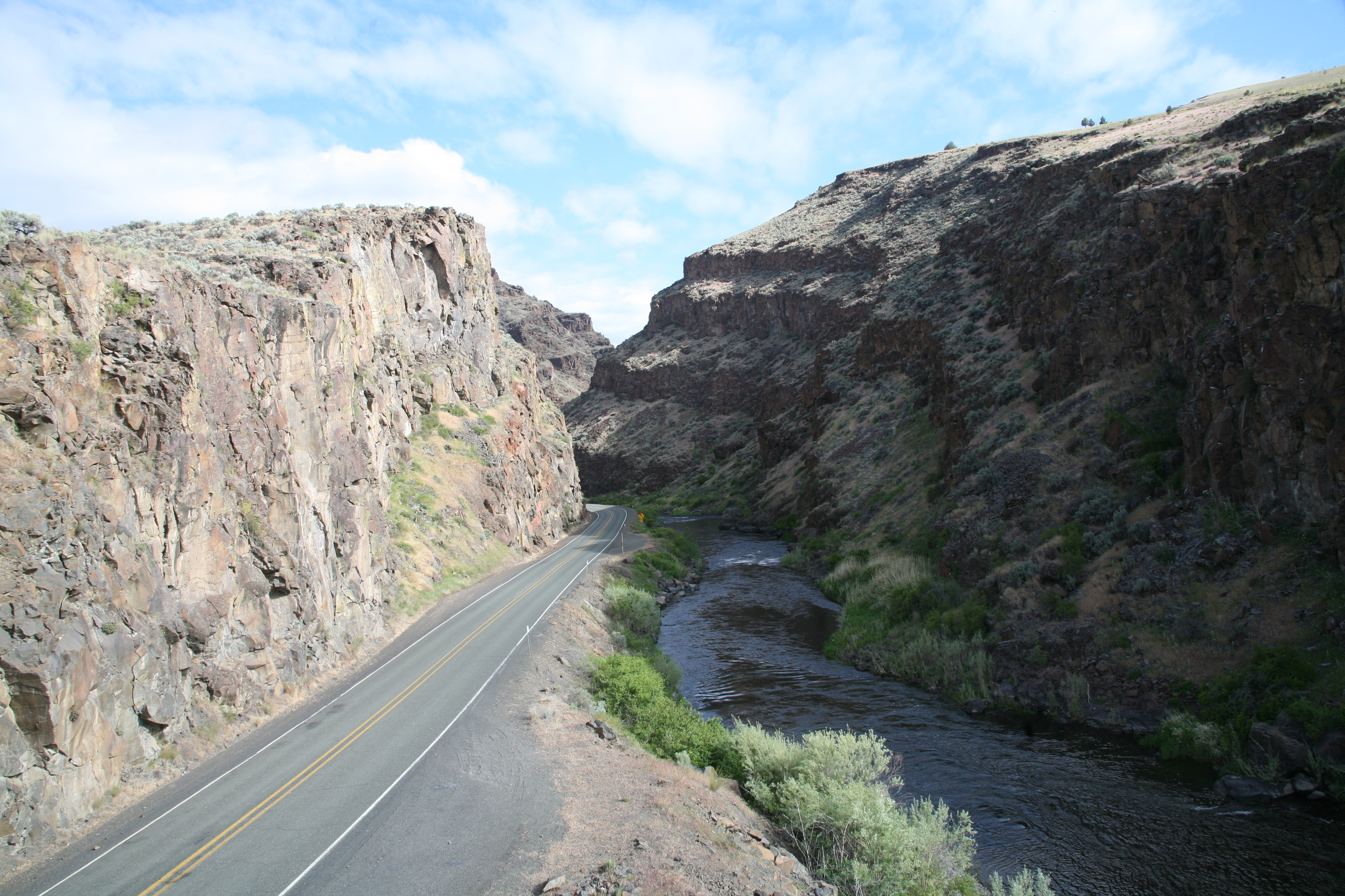
Picture Gorge in eastern Oregon, with US 26 at left and the John Day River at right

An ancient trail passed through the section of the Warm Springs Indian Reservation as part of an extensive Indian trade network linking peoples of the northern Great Basin and Columbia Plateau to those living west of the Cascade Range. Obsidian, bear grass, and slaves were transported over these trails to major trading locations along the Columbia River in exchange for dried salmon, smelt, sturgeon, and decorative sea shells. The long established route was later used by Peter Skene Ogden's fur trapping expeditions in 1825 and 1826. Fur trader Nathaniel Jarvis Wyeth was here in the 1830s. Captain John C. Frémont followed this route on his 1843 explorations for the U.S. and Lieutenant Henry Larcom Abbot headed a Pacific Railroad survey party along it in 1855.

The Sunset Highway portion, then also known as Oregon Route 2, was under construction by January 1933. Both the Works Progress Administration and Civilian Conservation Corps participated in the construction during the Great Depression. Portions of highway officially opened to the public on September 19, 1941. In 1949, the highway was completed.

The highway was originally named the Wolf Creek Highway after a nearby creek of the same name. The Oregon State Highway Commission renamed it the Sunset Highway at their January 17, 1946, meeting by a unanimous vote. The name is drawn from both the nickname and insignia of the 41st Infantry Division, which was largely drawn from Oregon, and because the highway leads towards the setting sun. The highway was rededicated in honor of the 41st Infantry Division in 1995.

=== As US Route 26 ===
In 1952, US 26 would be expanded to the coast. To achieve this, parts of US 28, all of Oregon Route 2 and Oregon Route 50, and part of Oregon Route 27 would become parts of the new US 26 Route. The remaining parts of US 28 would become US 126.

In the 1960s, Powell Boulevard in Portland was proposed as the corridor of the Mount Hood Freeway, which would have replaced US 26. It was cancelled in 1974 following a protests and local opposition. A few ramp stubs from I-5 on the Marquam Bridge were built to prepare for the new freeway and remained in place until the 2010s. The state and county government later considered moving US 26 to Division Street between I-205 and Gresham to improve freeway access. The cancelled freeway included plans to bypass Sandy, which were later revived in the 2000s and 2010s to address congestion issues in the area.

US 26 formerly terminated at a junction with US 30 in Astoria, sharing an alignment with US 101 north of Cannon Beach. The highway was truncated by the American Association of State Highway and Transportation Officials in 2005 following a request from the Oregon Department of Transportation (ODOT). Prior to 2005, US 26 ran through Downtown Portland on the one-way couplet of Market and Clay streets, which carried the Sunset Highway to its end at Naito Parkway (Pacific Highway West No. 1W), turning south there to reach the Ross Island Bridge.

In 2020, US 26 was designated POW/MIA Memorial Highway by the state legislature following a request from the Bend Heroes Foundation and Oregon Veterans Motorcycle Association.

== Major intersections ==
Milepoints are as reported by ODOT and do not necessarily reflect current mileage. Z indicates overlapping mileage due to construction longer than established route, and – indicates negative mileage behind established beginning point. Segments that are locally maintained may be omitted. For routes traversing multiple named state highways, each milepoint is preceded by the corresponding state highway number.

County	Location	Milepoint	Exit	Destinations	Notes
Clatsop	Cannon Beach Junction	47 -0.10		US 101 – Seaside, Astoria, Cannon Beach, Tillamook	Interchange; Western terminus
Clatsop	Necanicum Junction	47 9.42		OR 53 – Wheeler, Tillamook	
Clatsop	Jewell Junction	47 21.78		OR 103 north – Mist, Jewell	Interchange
Tillamook	No major junctions				
Washington	No major junctions				
Columbia	No major junctions				
Washington		47 40.91	Dennis L. Edwards Tunnel		
Washington	Staleys Junction	47 45.51		OR 47 north – Vernonia, Clatskanie	West end of OR 47 overlap
Washington	Davies Junction	47 49.47		OR 47 south – Banks, Forest Grove	Interchange; east end of OR 47 overlap
Washington	Tillamook Junction	47 53.33		OR 6 – Banks, Tillamook	Interchange; no westbound entrance
Washington		47 53.62	West end of freeway		
Washington		47 55.19	55	Dersham Road – Mountaindale	
Washington	North Plains	47 57.16	57	Glencoe Road – North Plains	
Washington		47 58.74	59	Jackson School Road	
Washington	Hillsboro	47 61.06	61	Helvetia Road, Brookwood Parkway	
Washington	Hillsboro	47 62.46	62	Cornelius Pass Road – Cornelius Pass, West Union	Signed as exits 62A (south) and 62B (north) westbound
Washington	Hillsboro	47 64.29	64	185th Avenue – PCC-Rock Creek	
Washington	Beaverton	47 65.67– 64.91	65	Bethany Boulevard, Cornell Road	
Washington	Beaverton	47 67.14	67	Murray Boulevard	
Washington	Beaverton	47 68.34	68	Cedar Hills Boulevard – Beaverton	
Washington	Beaverton	47 69.19	69A	OR 217 south to I-5 south – Beaverton, Tigard, Salem	
Washington	Beaverton	47 69.21	69B	Park Way, Barnes Road	
Washington	Beaverton	47 70.83	71A	OR 8 (Canyon Road)	Westbound exit and eastbound entrance
Multnomah	Portland	47 71.30	71B	Sylvan	Signed as exit 71 eastbound
Multnomah	Portland	47 72.18	72	Oregon Zoo, World Forestry Center	
Multnomah	Portland	47 73.39	73	Jefferson Street – Providence Park	Eastbound exit and westbound entrance, formerly signed as Canyon Road
Multnomah	Portland	47 73.53	Vista Ridge Tunnels		
Multnomah	Portland	47 73.75	74	Market Street – Portland City Center	Eastbound exit and westbound entrance
Multnomah	Portland	47 74.05 61 1.41		I-405 north to I-5 north / US 30 – St. Helens, Seattle	West end of I-405 overlap, exit 1D
Multnomah	Portland	61 1.39		12th Avenue	Westbound exit and eastbound entrance
Multnomah	Portland	61 1.29 (city street)		I-405 south to I-5 south / I-84 east / US 30 – The Dalles, Salem, Portland Airport	East end of I-405 overlap, exit 1C; eastbound exit & westbound entrance
Multnomah	Portland		East end of freeway		
Multnomah	Portland			Broadway Drive – Council Crest	No access from US 26 west
Multnomah	Portland			6th Avenue, Terwilliger Boulevard – Portland City Center, Keller Auditorium, Oregon Health & Science University, University and V.A. Hospitals	
Multnomah	Portland	(city street) 26 0.01		Naito Parkway (Pacific Highway West north)	Interchange; westbound exit and eastbound entrance
Multnomah	Portland	26 0.18		OR 10 west (Barbur Boulevard)	Interchange
Multnomah	Portland	26 0.45		OR 43 south (Macadam Avenue) to I-5 south – Lake Oswego, Salem	Interchange
Multnomah	Portland	26 0.76	Ross Island Bridge over the Willamette River		
Multnomah	Portland	26 1.01		OR 99E – Milwaukie, Oregon City	Interchange; eastbound exit to OR 99E north is via 17th Avenue south
Multnomah	Portland	26 1.60		17th Avenue south	Interchange; eastbound exit and westbound entrance
Multnomah	Portland	26 1.76		17th Avenue north	Westbound exit only
Multnomah	Portland	26 5.04		OR 213 (82nd Avenue)	
Multnomah	Portland	26 5.74		I-205 / Division Street – Seattle, Salem	I-205 exit 19.
Multnomah	Gresham	26 14.18		To I-84 / Burnside Road, Powell Valley Road	
Clackamas		26 19.54		OR 212 – Boring, Oregon City	Interchange
Clackamas	Sandy	26 24.40		OR 211 – Estacada, Molalla	
Clackamas		26 54.23		Timberline Lodge National Historic Landmark (OR 173)	
Clackamas		26 57.45 53 57.45		OR 35 north – Hood River	Interchange
Wasco		53 71.27		OR 216 – Bear Springs Ranger Station, Maupin, The Dalles	
Jefferson	Madras	53 117.71 4 92.08		US 97 north – The Dalles, Biggs	West end of US 97 overlap
Jefferson	Madras	4 92.46		D Street (OR 361) – Metolius, The Cove Palisades State Park	
Jefferson		4 97.29 360 0.09		US 97 south – Redmond, Bend	East end of US 97 overlap
Crook	Prineville	360 26.28 41 18.16		OR 126 west – Redmond, Bend	
Crook	Prineville	41 18.75		OR 27 – Bowman Dam	
Crook	Prineville	41 19.75		Prineville Reservoir, Paulina (OR 380)	
Wheeler	Mitchell	41 65.94		OR 207 – Spray, Service Creek, Fossil	
Grant		41 98.36 5 124.17		OR 19 north – Kimberly, Spray	
Grant	Mount Vernon	5 154.03		US 395 north – Long Creek, Pendleton	West end of US 395 overlap
Grant	John Day	5 162.29		US 395 south – Canyon City, Burns	East end of US 395 overlap
Grant	Austin Junction	5 190.67		OR 7 – Sumpter, Baker City	
Baker		5 210.54		OR 245 – Hereford, Baker City	
Malheur		5 223.22	Eldorado Pass		
Malheur	Vale	5 278.21 7 246.39		US 20 west – Vale City Center, Burns, Adrian	West end of US 20 overlap
Malheur	Cairo Junction	7 258.20		OR 201 north to I-84 – Ontario	West end of OR 201 overlap
Malheur	Nyssa	7 265.97		OR 201 south – Adrian, Lake Owyhee	East end of OR 201 overlap
Malheur		7 266.82	Idaho state line US 20 east / US 26 east continue into Idaho		
1.000 mi = 1.609 km; 1.000 km = 0.621 mi: Concurrency terminus; Incomplete access

U.S. Route 26
Previous state: Terminus	Oregon	Next state: Idaho
