= Dennis L. Edwards Tunnel =

Highway tunnel in northwestern Oregon

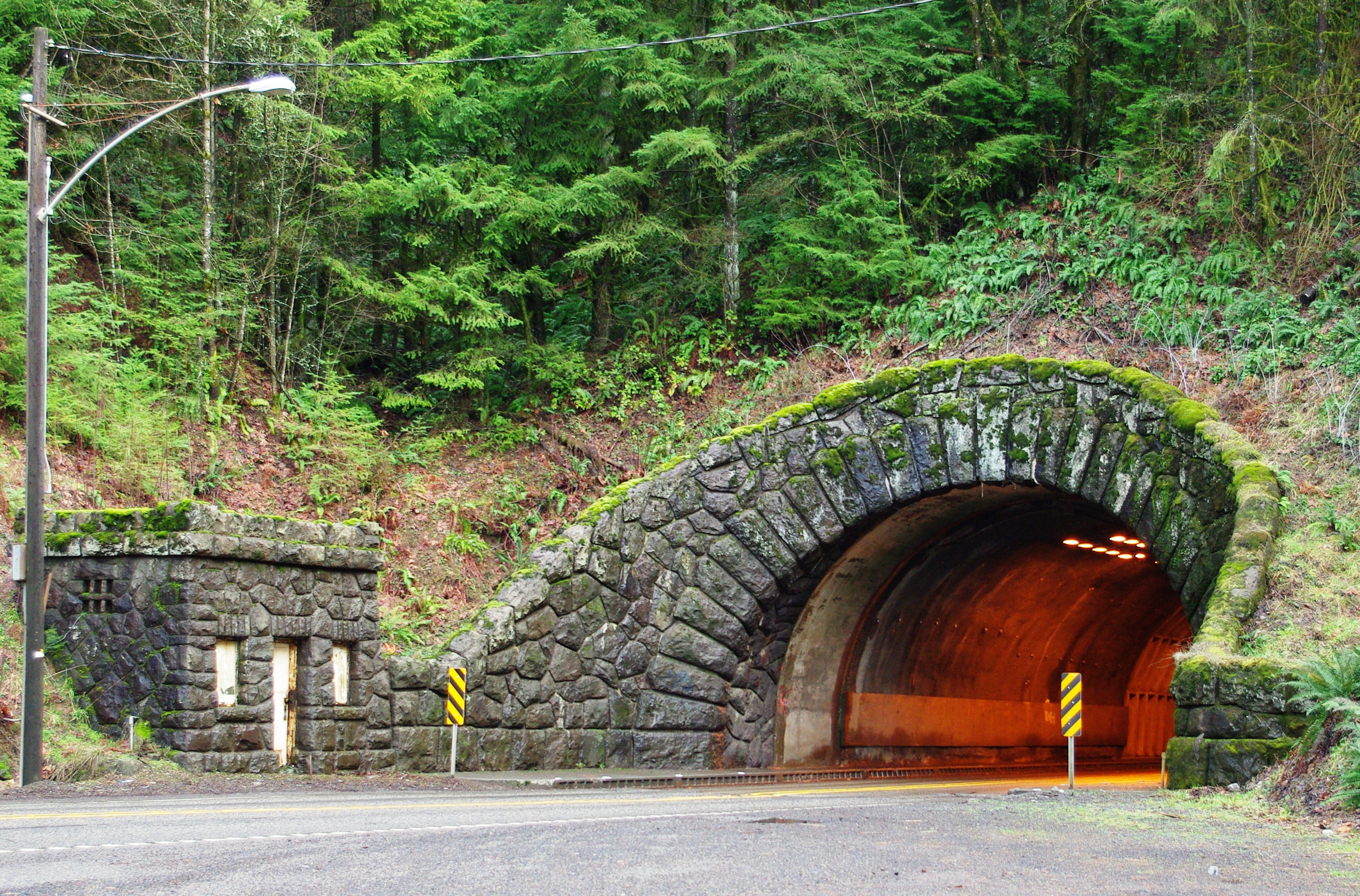
- West entrance to the tunnel
- Interactive map of Dennis L. Edwards Tunnel

Overview
- Other name: Sunset Tunnel
- Location: Oregon
- Coordinates: 45.73069°N 123.25210°W
- Route: US 26 (Sunset Highway)

Operation
- Opened: 1940
- Traffic: 7200 (2010)
- Toll: no

Technical
- Length: 772 feet (235 m)
- No. of lanes: 2
- Operating speed: 55 miles per hour (89 km/h)
- Max elevation: 1,200 feet (370 m)
- Tunnel clearance: 4.27 metres (14.0 ft)
- Width: 7.90 metres (25.9 ft)

The Dennis L. Edwards Tunnel is a highway tunnel in northwestern Oregon that carries the Sunset Highway (U.S. Route 26) through the Northern Oregon Coast Range mountains near the unincorporated community of Manning, approximately 28 miles (45 km) west of Portland. The tunnel was completed in 1940 and is 772.0 feet (235.3 m) long.

The tunnel was originally known as the Sunset Tunnel until 2002. It was renamed in honor of Dennis L. Edwards, an Oregon Department of Transportation worker who was killed on January 28, 1999 when part of the tunnel collapsed while he was inspecting it for damage caused by heavy rains. The tunnel was closed for five weeks for repairs, and renamed for Edwards three years later.

== See also ==
- List of tunnels in the United States
- List of tunnels by location
