= Interstate 405 (Oregon) =

Interstate Highway in Portland, Oregon, U.S.

Interstate 405
- Stadium Freeway No. 61
- A map of central Portland with I-405 highlighted in red

Route information
- Auxiliary route of I-5
- Maintained by ODOT
- Length: 4.25 mi (6.84 km)
- Existed: 1958–present
- NHS: Entire route

Major junctions
- South end: I-5 in Portland
- US 26 in Portland; US 30 in Portland
- North end: I-5 / US 30 in Portland

Location
- Country: United States
- State: Oregon
- Counties: Multnomah

Highway system
- Interstate Highway System; Main; Auxiliary; Suffixed; Business; Future; Oregon Highways; Interstate; US; State; Named; Scenic
← OR 402	→ OR 410

Interstate 405 (I-405), also known as the Stadium Freeway No. 61, is a short north–south Interstate Highway in Portland, Oregon. It forms a loop that travels around the west side of Downtown Portland, between two junctions with I-5 on the Willamette River near the Marquam Bridge to the south and Fremont Bridge to the north.

The Stadium Freeway was envisioned in the 1940s and 1950s by the state government and was added to the Interstate Highway system in 1958. Construction began in 1963, utilizing a trench with extensive landscaping and frequent overpasses, and was the most expensive freeway project in state history at a cost of $121 million. Hundreds of buildings were demolished to make way for the freeway, which displaced approximately 1,100 households.

The southernmost section of I-405 opened on October 26, 1965, and was followed by extensions in 1966 and 1969. The final section, including the Fremont Bridge, opened in November 1973. Plans for a spur freeway, I-505, were cancelled in 1978 following public opposition; its interchange with I-405 was subsequently reused for a 1988 realignment of U.S. Route 30 (US 30), which runs concurrent with I-405 across the Fremont Bridge to I-5.

== Route description ==
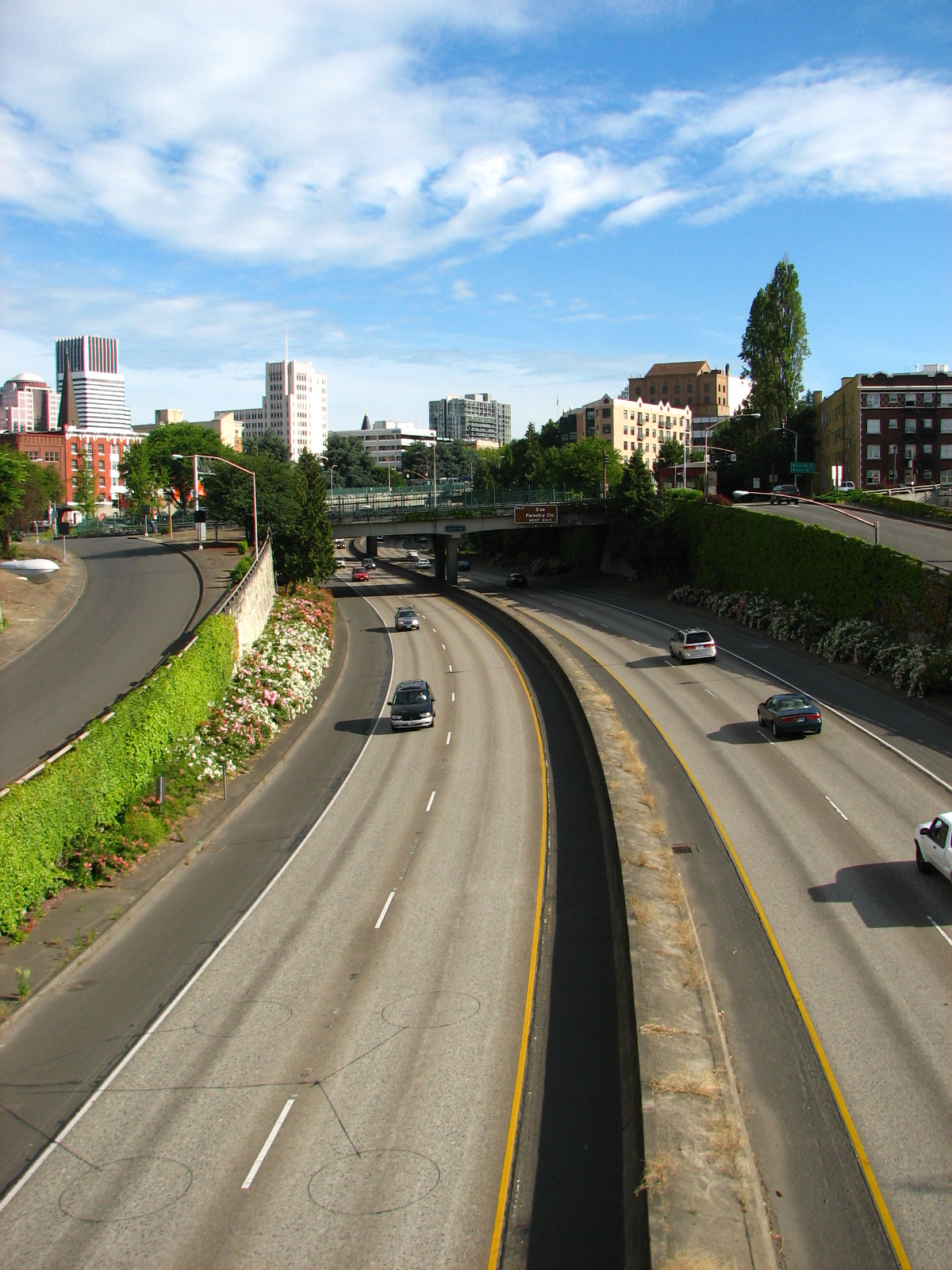
The view southward from the NW Everett Street overpass

I-405 begins at a three-way stack interchange with I-5 and Harbor Drive on the south side of Downtown Portland near the South Waterfront neighborhood. I-5 continues northeast from the interchange to the Marquam Bridge to East Portland and south towards South Portland, passing under the Ross Island Bridge. I-405 travels northwest along the foothills of the Southwest Hills, traveling around the urban campus of Portland State University and passing the end of the South Park Blocks. It begins a short concurrency with US 26.

US 26 splits from I-405 at an interchange north of Montgomery Street, traveling via the Vista Ridge Tunnels onto the Sunset Freeway towards the western suburbs of Portland. I-405 then turns northeast and narrows to four lanes as it travels through the east edge of the Goose Hollow neighborhood, passing the Multnomah County Central Library, Lincoln High School, and Providence Park, home of several local soccer teams. The below-grade freeway is connected to the neighborhood and the western fringe of downtown by a series of ramps that lead to Salmon and Taylor streets. At Yamhill and Morrison streets, I-405 crosses under bridges carrying MAX Light Rail trains, which continues west towards Beaverton and east to Downtown Portland.

I-405 intersects Burnside Street and turns due north as it climbs out of the below-grade trench, running parallel to 15th and 16th avenues. After an interchange with Glisan Street, the freeway becomes elevated and passes over cross-streets in the Pearl District, including those carrying the tracks of the Portland Streetcar's NS Line. A streetcar maintenance barn and railyard is located under the freeway between Marshall and Overton streets. At the northwest edge of Downtown Portland, I-405 intersects US 30, which continues northwest along a short freeway into the Northwest Industrial Area that was originally intended for the cancelled I-505.

I-405 and US 30 become concurrent as they cross over the Willamette River on the eight-lane Fremont Bridge, a steel tied-arch bridge that carries southbound traffic on its upper deck and northbound traffic below. The double-decker freeway continues northeast over the Union Pacific Railroad's Albina railyard and Interstate Avenue, a part of Route 99W that also carries the MAX Yellow Line. The northern terminus of I-405 is at a stack interchange with I-5 in the Eliot neighborhood; US 30 continues southeasterly onto I-5 for a short distance before beginning a concurrency with I-84. A set of ramps continue northeast from the interchange to Legacy Emanuel Hospital along the alignment of the cancelled Rose City Freeway.

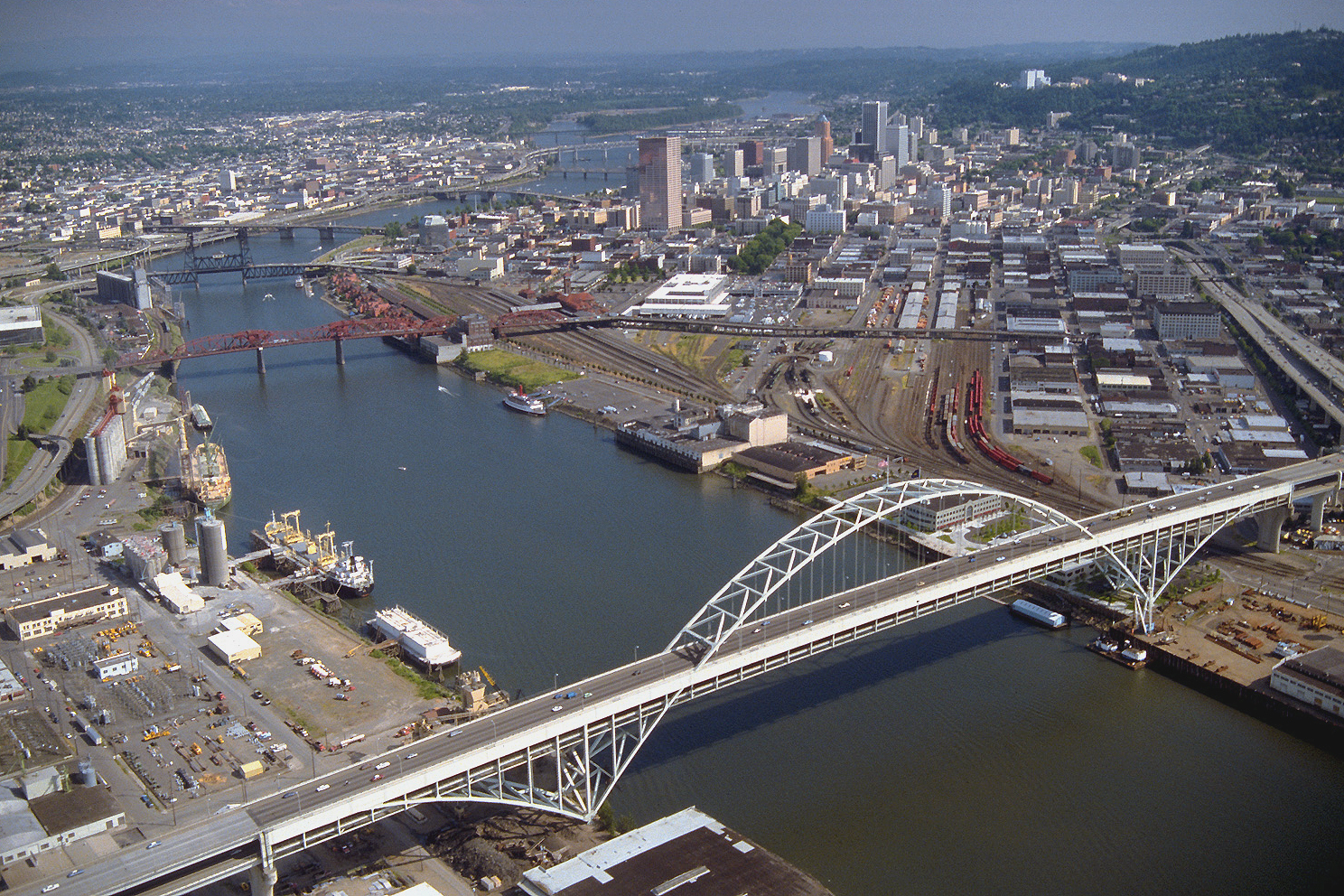
Aerial view of Downtown Portland and the Fremont Bridge, which carries I-405 across the Willamette River, taken in 1988

I-405, also designated as Stadium Freeway No. 61, is the shortest Interstate freeway in the Portland area, at 4.2 miles (6.8 km). It has a posted speed limit of 50 miles per hour (80 km/h) because of the short distance between interchanges and high volume of merging traffic. The highway is maintained by the Oregon Department of Transportation (ODOT), who conduct an annual survey of traffic volume that is expressed in terms of annual average daily traffic (AADT), a measure of traffic volume for any average day of the year. The busiest section of I-405 is at Burnside Street, which carried a daily average of 131,400 vehicles in 2018; and the least-trafficked section, at Southwest Broadway, carried 84,400 vehicles. The freeway had an estimated 8 hours of northbound congestion and 11.8 hours of southbound congestion in 2017, with average speeds of 22.8 mph (36.7 km/h) for northbound traffic and 23.8 mph (38.3 km/h) for southbound traffic during weekday afternoon rush hours. TriMet operates one bus route on I-405, Line 24, which uses the Fremont Bridge as a connection between Slabtown and Legacy Emanuel Hospital.

== History ==
=== Planning and routing dispute ===
The two finalist routing options for the Stadium Freeway:
'"`UNIQ--templatestyles-0000004C-QINU`"' the Foothills route
'"`UNIQ--templatestyles-0000004D-QINU`"' the Clay–Market route

Highway planner Robert Moses was commissioned by the city government in 1943 to envision a program of public improvements that would begin after the end of World War II to provide employment for returning soldiers. Among these were a network of "thruways" for Portland, including a downtown loop consisting of the Foothills Thruway (later forming I-405) and the East-Side Thruway (later I-5), connected by a northern crossing of the Willamette River. The Foothills Thruway would run along Northwest 24th Avenue and terminate at two intersections with Harbor Drive at the Ross Island Bridge to the south and the new Willamette River bridge to the north. A city study released in June 1955 proposed the construction of several freeways in downtown Portland, including the Sunset Freeway and Stadium Freeway—later combined to form I-405. The northern crossing would use the double-decker Fremont Bridge, which had been proposed earlier as part of U.S. Route 99W in the 1920s but defeated in public referendums.

The federal Bureau of Public Roads included the Stadium Freeway in its 1955 recommendation for a national system of expressways that were later funded by the Federal-Aid Highway Act of 1956. The 3.8-mile (6.1 km) freeway was estimated to cost $71 million in 1958 dollars (equivalent to $590 million in 2024 dollars) and would be funded primarily by the federal government under the Interstate Highways program. The Oregon Highway Division studied a set of five alternate routes for the freeway, designated as Interstate 405 by the federal government in 1958, with input from the city government over potential impacts to the west side of the central business district. The southern section from the Marquam Bridge to US 26 near Southwest Jefferson Street was split into two options: the Clay–Market route, following Clay and Market streets to the north of Portland State College; and the Foothills route, which would curve along the southwest side of an urban renewal area with a depressed roadway. The northern section from US 26 to the Fremont Bridge was split into three options: an elevated freeway between 15th and 16th avenues proposed by the city; an elevated freeway between 18th and 19th avenues; and a depressed roadway between 21st and 22nd avenues.

The city government, Portland State College, and downtown business groups lobbied in support of the Clay–Market route, producing their own study that claimed it would preserve downtown property values. The Oregon State Highway Commission and Bureau of Public Roads preferred the Foothills route because it had $4 million (equivalent to $32.4 million in 2024 dollars) in cost savings compared to the Clay–Market route. The Oregon chapter of the American Institute of Architects and several industry groups recommended a delay in deciding the route based on potential damage to the cityscape caused by the designs in both options. By late May, a total of 389 households and 37 businesses had been relocated in anticipation of the freeway project, while 47 buildings had been demolished. The state highway commission hosted a public hearing in June 1960 to hear testimony from 300 people at Portland's Public Auditorium. The commission adopted the Foothills route and 15th–16th elevated freeway for I-405 on July 8, which would cost an estimated $75.7 million to construct (equivalent to $613 million in 2024 dollars). The Portland City Council then voted on July 14 to approve the general route endorsed by the state highway commission.

=== Property acquisition and Foothills construction ===
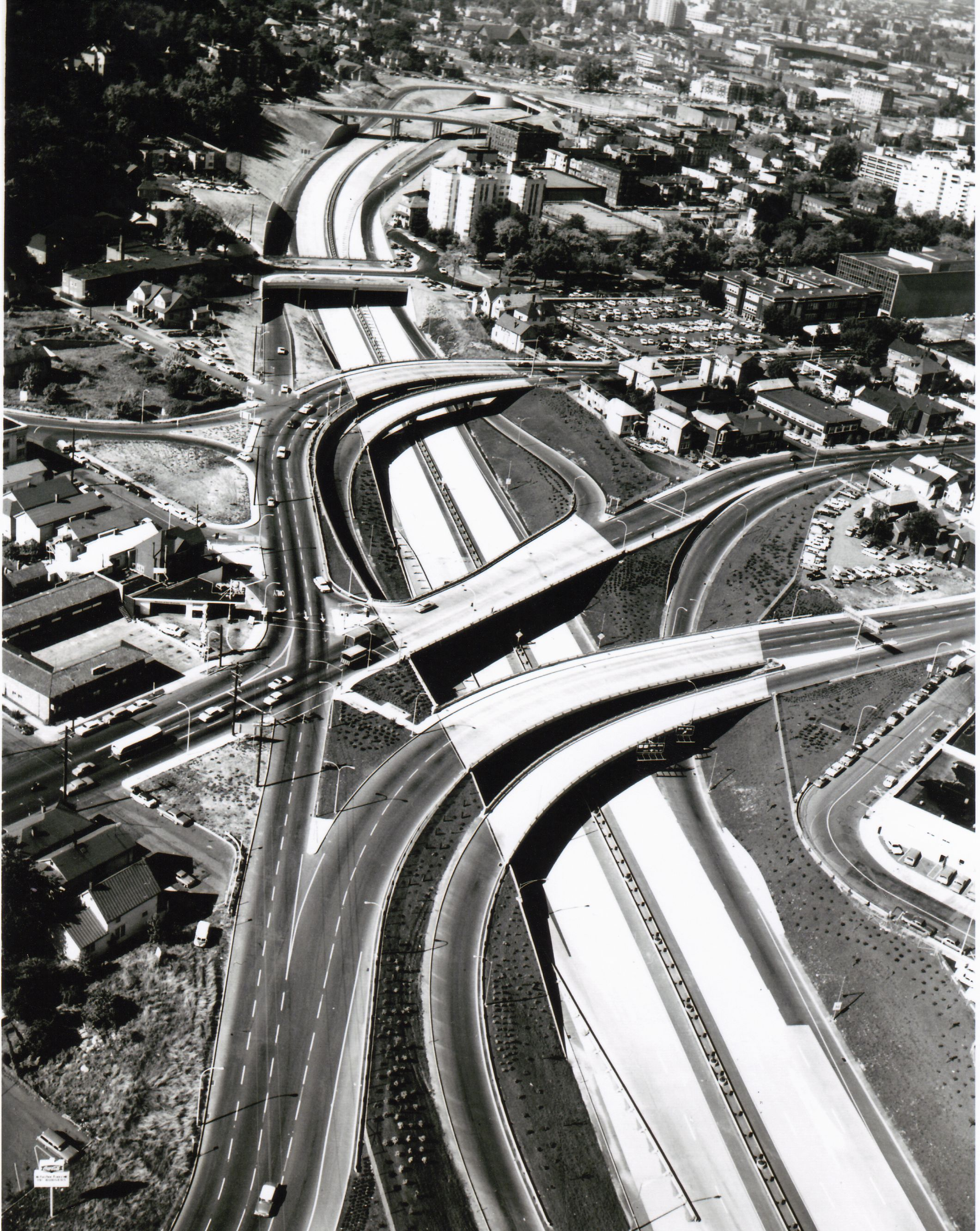
Interstate 405 under construction next to Portland State University, 1966

The state government began negotiations to acquire property along the Stadium Freeway's future right of way in October 1960, later requesting federal funds to aid the city government with relocating an estimated 1,100 households affected by planned demolitions. An estimated 554 buildings with 1,668 residential units were in the right of way for the freeway, including a school, several churches, and a recently completed synagogue for Congregation Shaarie Torah. In 1963, the owner of the Carlton Hotel, a long-term care home with 139 elderly residents, appealed the condemnation and planned demolition of the building to make way for the Stadium Freeway. The state government agreed to assist in relocating the residents to a new building, but its lack of a fire sprinkler system mandated for recipients of state welfare forced the eviction of 80 residents from the Carlton Hotel. Further planning work was delayed by a dispute with the city government and Bureau of Public Roads over the location of ramps and interchanges in early 1961, which were resolved with formal federal approval in August. The state highway commission approved the designation of Highway No. 61 for the Stadium Freeway on December 8, 1961.

In February 1962, the Portland City Council postponed its decisions on closing streets for freeway construction and ratification of an agreement with the state highway commission on maintenance of ramps and overpasses after protests from local residents, who described I-405 as a "gigantic monstrosity" and the "West Side Suicide". The state highway commission halted its property acquisition negotiations the following month while awaiting the city council's approval of the agreement and other plans, which were required under federal law. The protests coincided with the growing opposition to other freeway projects in the Portland area, including the Laurelhurst Freeway (I-205), at the onset of the region's freeway revolts. A pair of downtown businessmen formed the Citizens for Sane Freeways Committee and attempted to lobby the Bureau of Public Roads to adopt Harbor Drive as its route for I-405, but they were rejected because it did not meet modern freeway standards. The group later circulated a public petition with 3,000 signatures opposing the construction of the 13th–14th avenues section of the freeway between US 26 and Burnside Street. On March 22, the city council voted unanimously to approve its agreements with the state highway commission after a four-hour public hearing with 35 speakers, allowing the state government to resume property acquisition.

The Stadium Freeway project was divided into several stages to reduce long-term disruption to cross-town access, beginning with the trenched roadway in the Foothills area with 19 overpasses and working northward. The project required the demolition of 282 homes, 138 businesses, and 131 apartment buildings, costing $25 million (equivalent to $164 million in 2024 dollars) in condemnations and land purchases. The state highway commission awarded the first construction contract for the Stadium Freeway project in August 1963, accepting a $4.4 million bid (equivalent to $34.4 million in 2024 dollars) from the Donald M. Drake Company to build the 1.08-mile (1.74 km) section from the Ross Island Bridge to Southwest Broadway with connections to the Marquam Bridge and the new freeway which became I-5. Construction began with utility relocation and the construction of temporary street detours in October 1963, ahead of work on the Vista Ridge Tunnels (part of US 26), which began the following month. Demolition and site clearing began by the end of 1963, with the St. Joseph's Catholic Church (built in 1887) among the oldest buildings to be demolished for the project; other buildings were saved from demolition and moved to new locations, including the two-story Century Building (which suffered fire damage during its month-long move), the former home of territorial governor George Law Curry, and St. Helen's Hall at Trinity Episcopal Cathedral. The broadcast studios of KGW-TV were also demolished for the project, requiring a $865,000 settlement from the state government for its property.

The Stadium Freeway's first completed overpass, carrying Southwest 4th Avenue, opened to traffic in March 1965 and replaced a temporary crossing that had been in use since May 1964. The not-yet-complete freeway was used as the boundary between the state's 1st and 3rd congressional districts following a special redistricting vote by the state legislature in May 1965. The first section of I-405, between the Ross Island Bridge and Southwest Broadway, opened to traffic on October 26, 1965, two months later than scheduled and at a cost of $5.5 million (equivalent to $41.6 million in 2024 dollars). The delay was attributed to heavy rains that prevented painting of lane markings and to a failed shipment of raised pavement markers. Excavation of the second section, also under the direction of the Drake Company, began in September 1965. It opened in September 1966, extending I-405 from Broadway to Southwest Montgomery Street near the Vista Ridge Tunnel. The Marquam Bridge opened a month later, granting access to East Portland via new ramps from I-405 to I-5.

=== Northern section and cancelled extensions ===
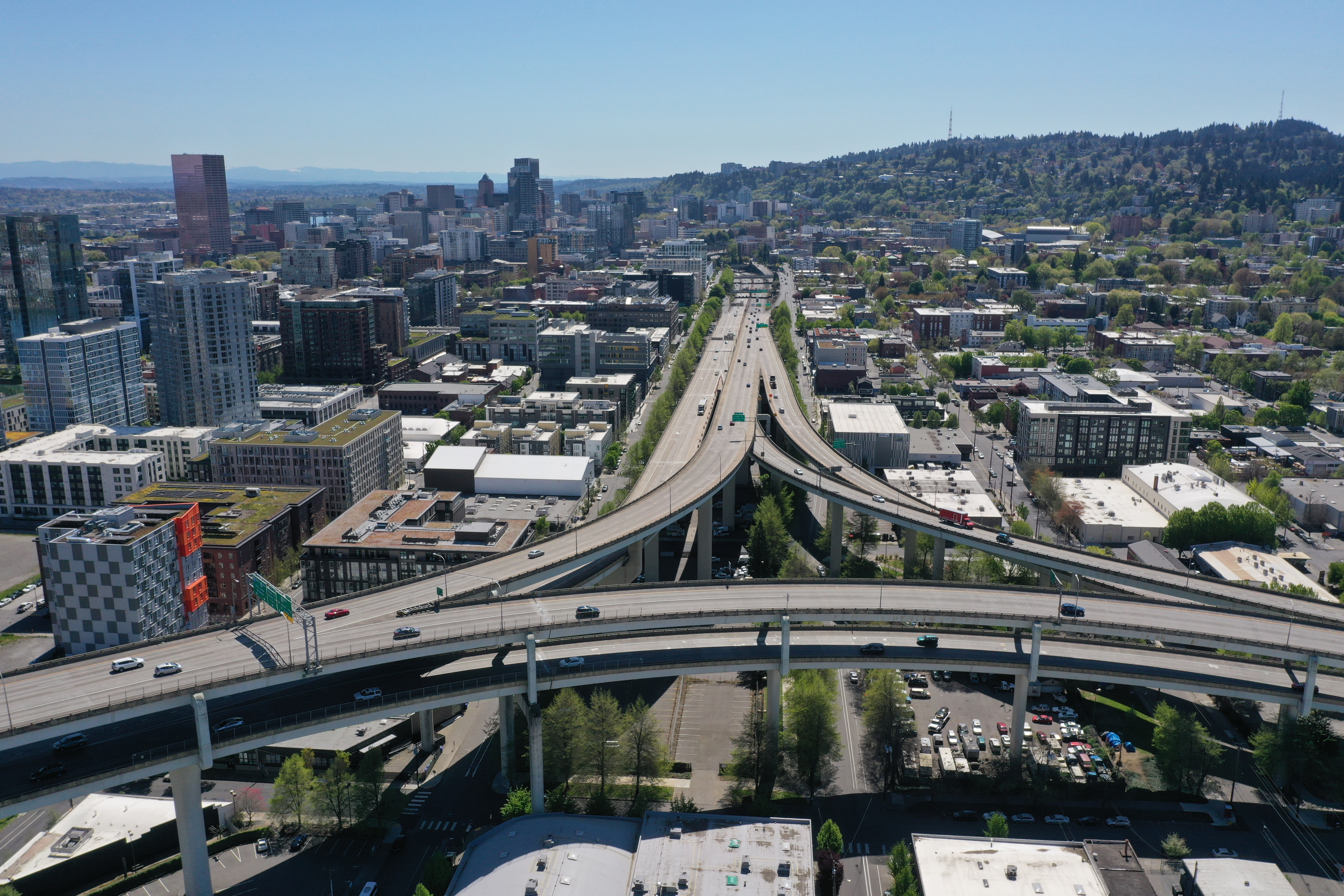
Aerial view looking south on I-405 at the terminus of the cancelled I-505 (now US 30)

Construction of the third phase of I-405, covering 1.17 miles (1.88 km) between Montgomery and Johnson streets, began in July 1966 under a $12.3 million contract (equivalent to $90.6 million in 2024 dollars)—the largest to be awarded by in the state highway commission's history. It included 22 overpasses to reduce disruption to the street grid and 55 retaining walls, which were covered by planted trees, shrubs, and ivy to beautify the freeway. An estimated 1,000,000 cubic yards (760,000 m^{3}) of dirt were excavated for the project and reused to fill industrial sites on the Willamette River. The freeway's overpasses were opened to traffic in October 1968, but completion of the lanes and ramps was delayed over heavy rains that disrupted grading and installation of guardrails and signs. The Montgomery–Johnson section was opened to traffic on February 25, 1969, after an additional two-month delay because of snowy and icy weather. It coincided with the opening of the Vista Ridge Tunnels, which provided a connection to the Sunset Freeway (US 26) and replaced an earlier street.

The tied arch design of the Fremont Bridge was approved by the state government, city council, and Bureau of Public Roads in May 1966. The costlier design was recommended by the Portland Art Commission after public outcry over the perceived "ugliness" of the Marquam Bridge and the initial cantilever design for the Fremont Bridge. Construction began in late 1968 and was originally estimated to cost $22.4 million (equivalent to $154 million in 2024 dollars) until later design changes caused its total cost to reach $50 million (equivalent to $343 million in 2024 dollars). The Fremont Bridge and I-5 interchange opened on November 15, 1973, at a final cost of $82 million (equivalent to $441 million in 2024 dollars). I-405 cost a total of $121 million to construct (equivalent to $651 million in 2024 dollars), making it the most expensive freeway project in Oregon on a per-mile basis.

The northern section included construction of stub ramps to two future freeway extensions: the Industrial Freeway (I-505) from the west end of the Fremont Bridge and the Rose City Freeway from the I-5 interchange at the east end of the bridge. I-505 was approved by the federal government in 1969 and was planned to begin construction shortly after the bridge opened, but was halted by lawsuits from neighborhood activists. The project was cancelled in 1978 and the ramps were reused for an expressway section of US 30 connecting to Yeon Avenue, which opened in 1988. The Rose City Freeway remained part of a long-term freeways plan from the city government, but was later cancelled because of a lack of funding. The unused ramps were instead redirected to Kerby Avenue to serve the expanded Legacy Emanuel Hospital with approval from the city council in 1974 despite protests from local residents, which stalled the project for several years. The ramps were opened in 1979 with limited access to nearby streets as a compromise for the neighborhood.

=== Later developments ===
In August 2009, the entirety of I-405 with the exception of the Fremont Bridge was completely repaved for the first time by ODOT. The bridge itself was repaved in August 2011. ODOT began a year-long project to repair and replace expansion joints on elevated sections of the freeway in March 2019 because of extended deterioration of the structure.

In 1998, Mayor Vera Katz proposed capping the southwest portion of I-405 to create space for parks, housing, and offices. A similar proposal was suggested by the Portland Art Commission in 1964, but not studied until the adoption of the 1972 Downtown Plan. Plans to cap portions of I-405 have been made by grassroots organizations since the 2000s, aiming to mitigate the effects of the freeway and create new development in northwestern Portland. A 200-foot (61 m) bridge, named Ned Flanders Crossing for The Simpsons character Ned Flanders, was built to create a pedestrian and bicycle connection across I-405 between two sections of Northwest Flanders Street in Northwest Portland. Construction on the bridge began in June 2020 and it opened a year later at a cost of $9.5 million.

== Exit list ==
The entire route is in Portland, Multnomah County.

mi	km	Exit	Destinations	Notes
−0.04	−0.064	—	I-5 south – Salem	Exit 299B on I-5
0.52	0.84	1A	South Waterfront – City Center	Northbound exit and southbound entrance
0.52	0.84	—	I-5 north to I-84 east – The Dalles, Seattle	Southbound exit and northbound entrance
0.89	1.43	1B	4th Avenue	Northbound exit and southbound entrance
1.03	1.66	1C	US 26 east / 6th Avenue – Ross Island Bridge	South end of US 26 concurrency
1.40	2.25	1D	12th Avenue	Northbound exit and southbound entrance
1.62	2.61	1D	US 26 west – Beaverton	North end of US 26 concurrency
1.92	3.09	2A	Salmon Street – Providence Park	Northbound exit and southbound entrance
2.20	3.54	2A	Burnside Street / Couch Street	Southbound exit and northbound entrance
2.35	3.78	2B	Everett Street	
3.08	4.96	3	US 30 west – Northwest Industrial Area, St. Helens	South end of US 30 concurrency
3.32	5.34	Fremont Bridge over Willamette River		
3.78	6.08	—	US 30 east (I-5 south) – The Dalles	North end of US 30 concurrency; northbound exit and southbound entrance
4.18	6.73	—	Kerby Avenue	Northbound exit and southbound entrance
4.21	6.78	—	I-5 north – Seattle	Exit 302B on I-5
1.000 mi = 1.609 km; 1.000 km = 0.621 mi: Concurrency terminus; Incomplete access
