= Eldorado Pass =

Mountain pass in Oregon, United States

- Interactive map of Eldorado Pass
- Elevation: 4,623 ft (1,409 m)
- Traversed by: US 26

Third Approach
- Location: Malheur County, Oregon, United States
- Coordinates: 44.338217°N 118.085762°W

Eldorado Pass (el. 4623 ft.) is a mountain pass in Oregon traversed by U.S. Route 26.
