= Vista Ridge Tunnels =

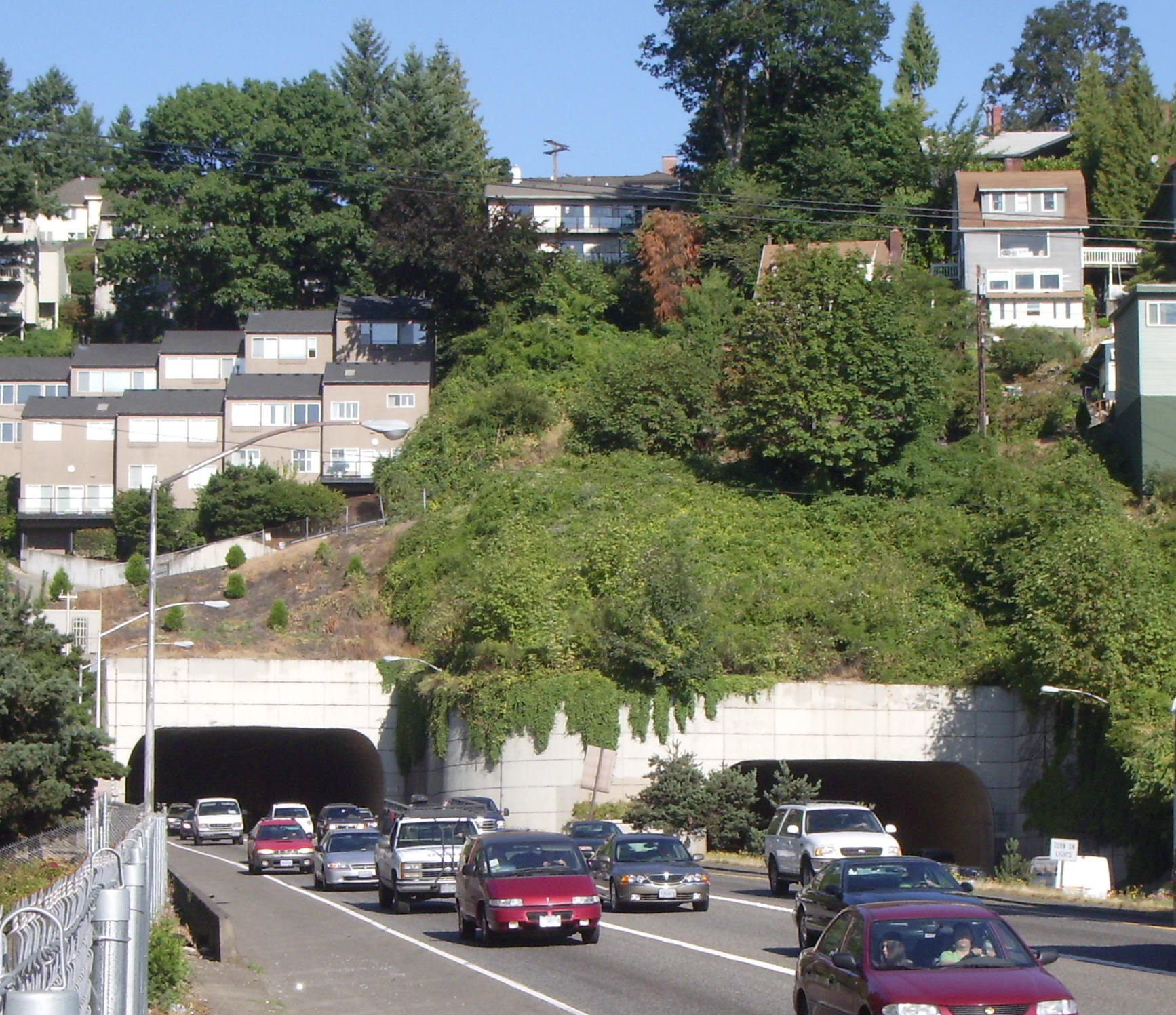
- The east end of the Vista Ridge Tunnels face downtown Portland and pass under a residential neighborhood.
- Interactive map of Vista Ridge Tunnels

Overview
- Location: Portland, Oregon, US
- Coordinates: 45.5158°N 122.6991°W (west); 45.5156°N 122.6948°W (east)
- Status: operational
- Route: US 26

Operation
- Opened: 1969–1970
- Owner: Oregon Department of Transportation
- Traffic: Automotive
- Character: Limited access highway

Technical
- No. of lanes: 6 (3 in each bore)
- Operating speed: 50 mph (80 km/h)

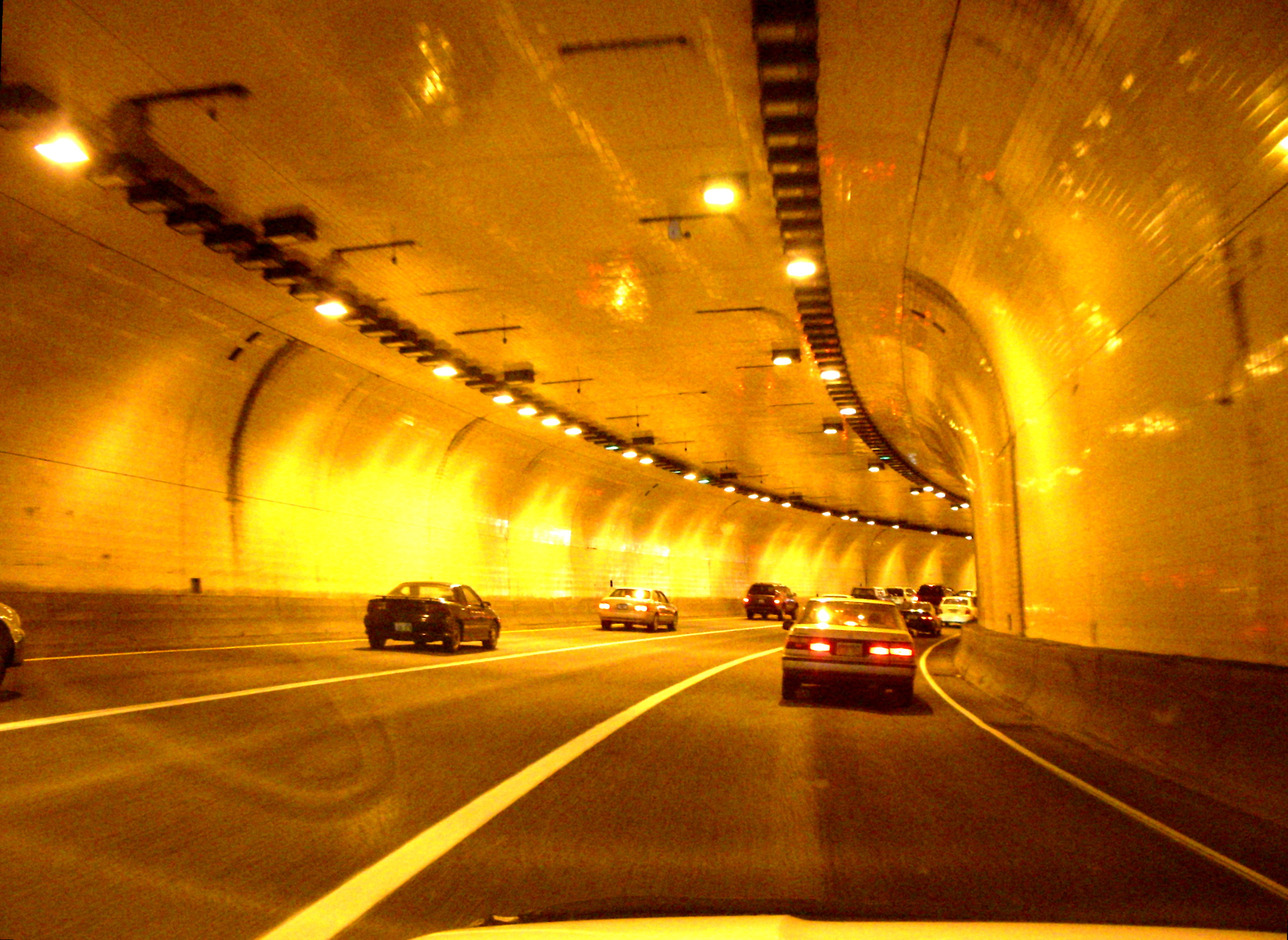
View at mid-tunnel eastbound

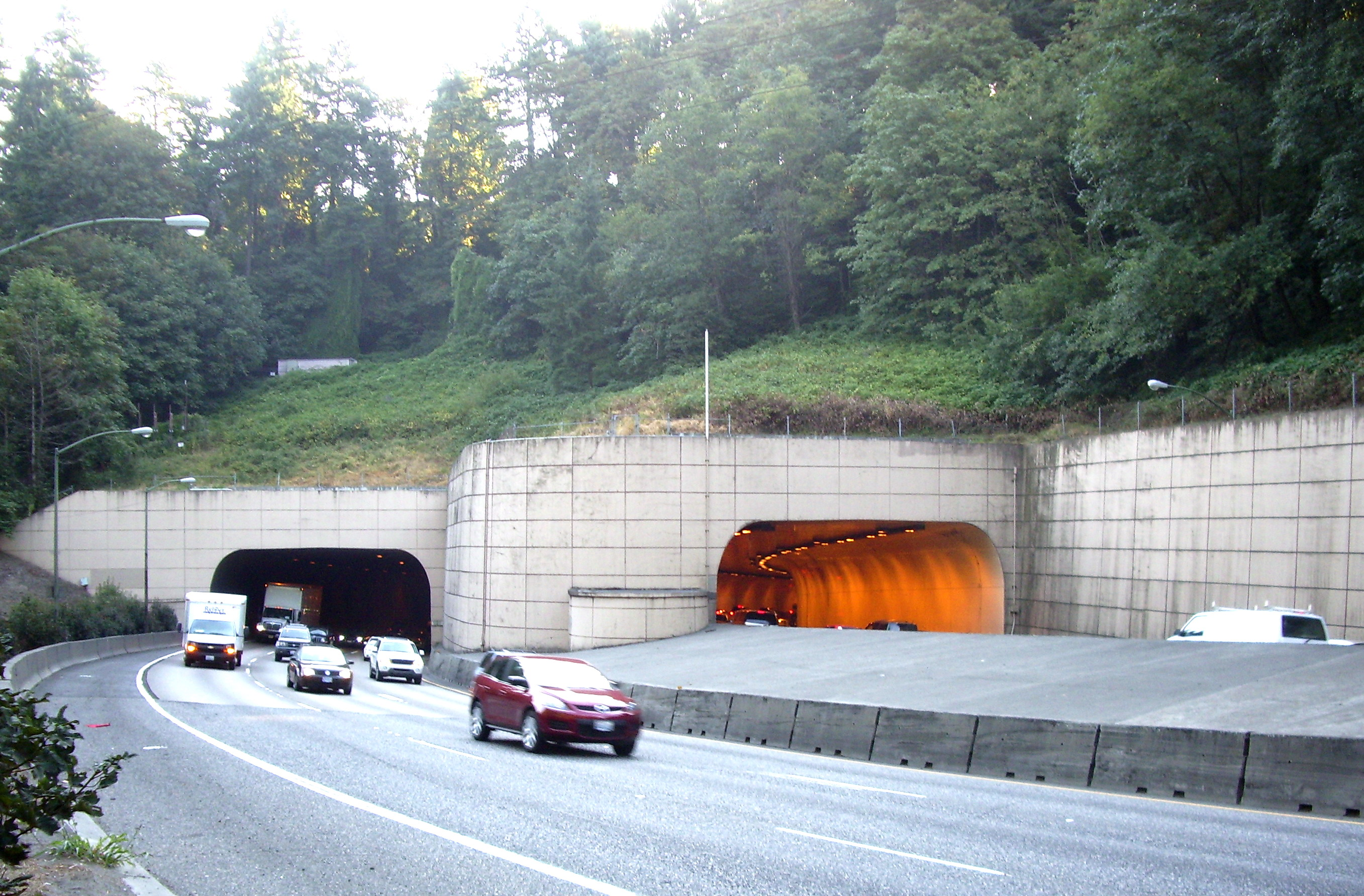
The west end of the Vista Ridge Tunnels

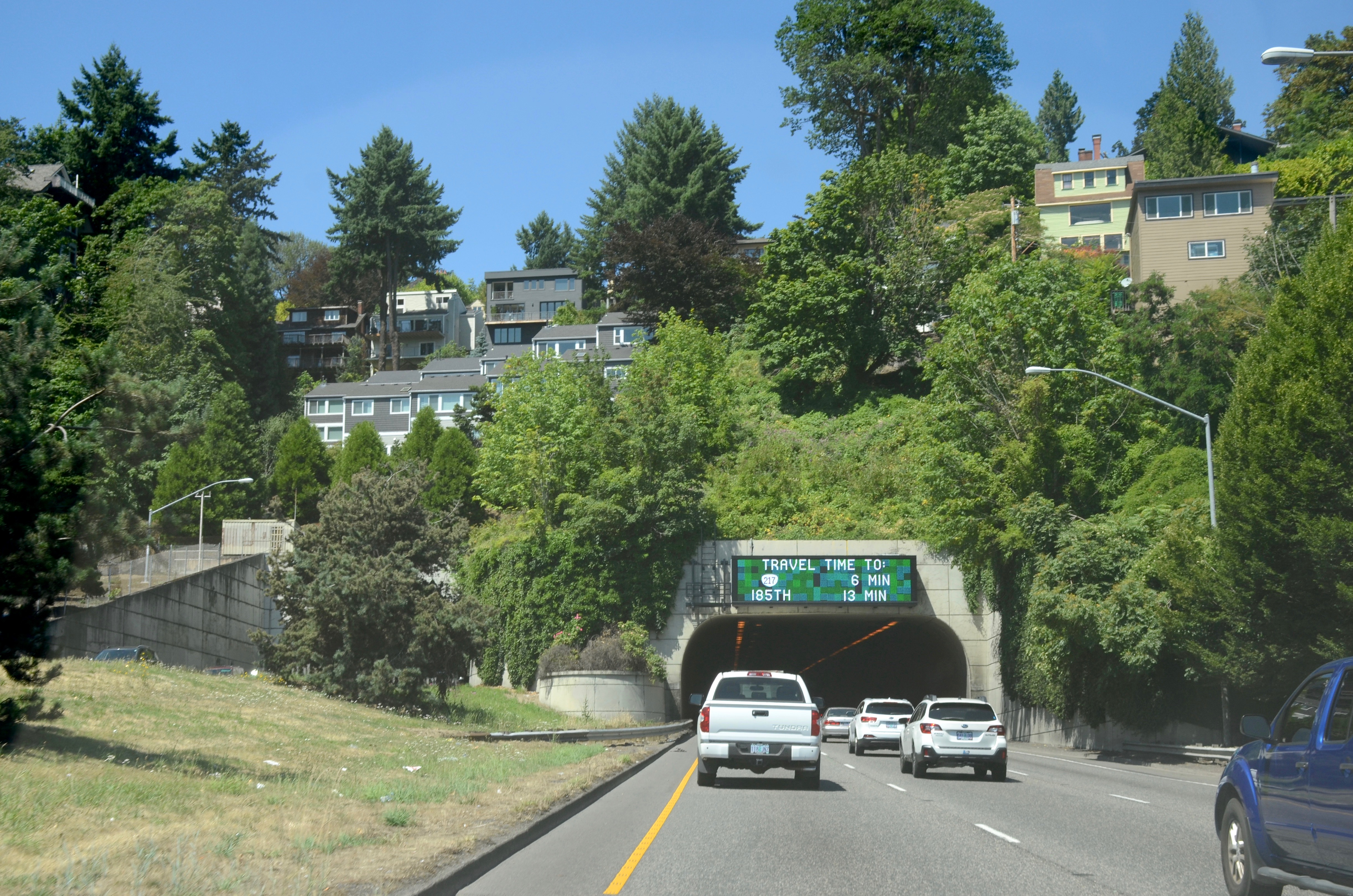
The east portal of the westbound tunnel in July 2019, showing the new electronic information sign that was brought into use in 2018

The Vista Ridge Tunnels are highway tunnels through the Tualatin Mountains ("West Hills") of Portland, Oregon, United States. With their eastern ends located in the Goose Hollow neighborhood, the tunnels pass through a hillside locally known as Vista Ridge, a half mile (1 km) west of downtown Portland. Sunset Highway, also known as U.S. Route 26, is carried through the tunnels, three lanes in each direction. They are Oregon's busiest tunnels.

== Design ==
The eastbound tunnel is 1001 feet (305 m) in length; the westbound tunnel is 949 feet (289 m). Both have 41 ft (12.5 m) of horizontal and 15.58 ft (4.75 m) of vertical clearance. The eastbound tunnel was re-bored to replace a two-way motor traffic tunnel originally built in 1920. The eastbound tunnel was completed in 1969, the westbound a year later.

There is a six-percent grade through the tunnels. Most of the tunnels' lengths are straight, though they curve southward at the west ends 35°.

The tunnels were built with ventilation shafts which were never used. Instead, the shafts were later adapted for electrical wiring, so as to improve tunnel illumination without marring the tunnels' appearance with visible conduit.

To improve tunnel safety for motorists, and decrease the tunnel lighting requirements, the original tunnel entrance faces were sandblasted to remove white paint and repainted a less luminescent tan color to reduce the range of visual light adaptation required by drivers. At one time there were computer-based electronic light controls, but they were replaced by relatively simple photo detectors and relays for durability and simplicity. The night lighting level is enabled permanently and is supplemented by two or three levels of daytime lighting.

== Geography ==
Except directly over the tunnels, the hillsides are steep and undeveloped forest, with some residential development along the top of the ridges. Landslides occasionally occur, but are usually minor and quickly cleared.

The tunnels are located nearly at the bottom of a hill where the road gradient averages 6.5% over 2.25 mi (3.6 km). Close to the east portals is a 130-foot (40 m) tunnel underpass carrying SW 18th Avenue. Just outside the west portals is a 650-foot (200 m) tunnel under the lanes which carries eastbound Canyon Road from the exit ramp into Goose Hollow. The Robertson Tunnel for MAX Light Rail is underground approximately 800 feet (250 m) to the west.

== History ==
The tunnels have been closed to hazardous material transport since November 1, 1994. As a result, US 26 is closed to hazardous material transport between I-405 and Oregon Route 217.

An electronic sign giving motorists real-time information on travel times to Highway 217 under current conditions, and other messages as needed, was installed above the east portal of the westbound tunnel in June 2017 and was activated in August 2018.

The tunnel's internal lighting was upgraded to LED in July 2020. The replacement lights use about half the electricity of the previous high-pressure sodium vapor bulbs and require replacement every 15–20 years instead of every two to four years. The LEDs have a color temperature of 4000 K.

== Traffic volume ==
They are the busiest tunnels in Oregon, 12% busier than I-5's 6-lane Interstate Bridge, and 2% busier than I-205's 8+ lane Glenn L. Jackson Memorial Bridge.

Year	Average Daily Traffic Volume
1986	102,300
1996	128,700 or 142,950
2000	134,400
2005	139,325
2010	138,369
2015	142,400

== See also ==
- List of tunnels in the United States
