= Oregon Route 27 =

State highway in central Oregon, US

Oregon Route 27
- Route 27 highlighted in red

Route information
- Maintained by ODOT
- Length: 44.79 mi (72.08 km)
- Existed: 1932–present
- Component highways: Crooked River Highway No. 14

Major junctions
- South end: US 20 near Brothers
- North end: US 26 in Prineville

Location
- Country: United States
- State: Oregon
- Counties: Deschutes, Crook

Highway system
- Oregon Highways; Interstate; US; State; Named; Scenic
← US 26	→ US 30

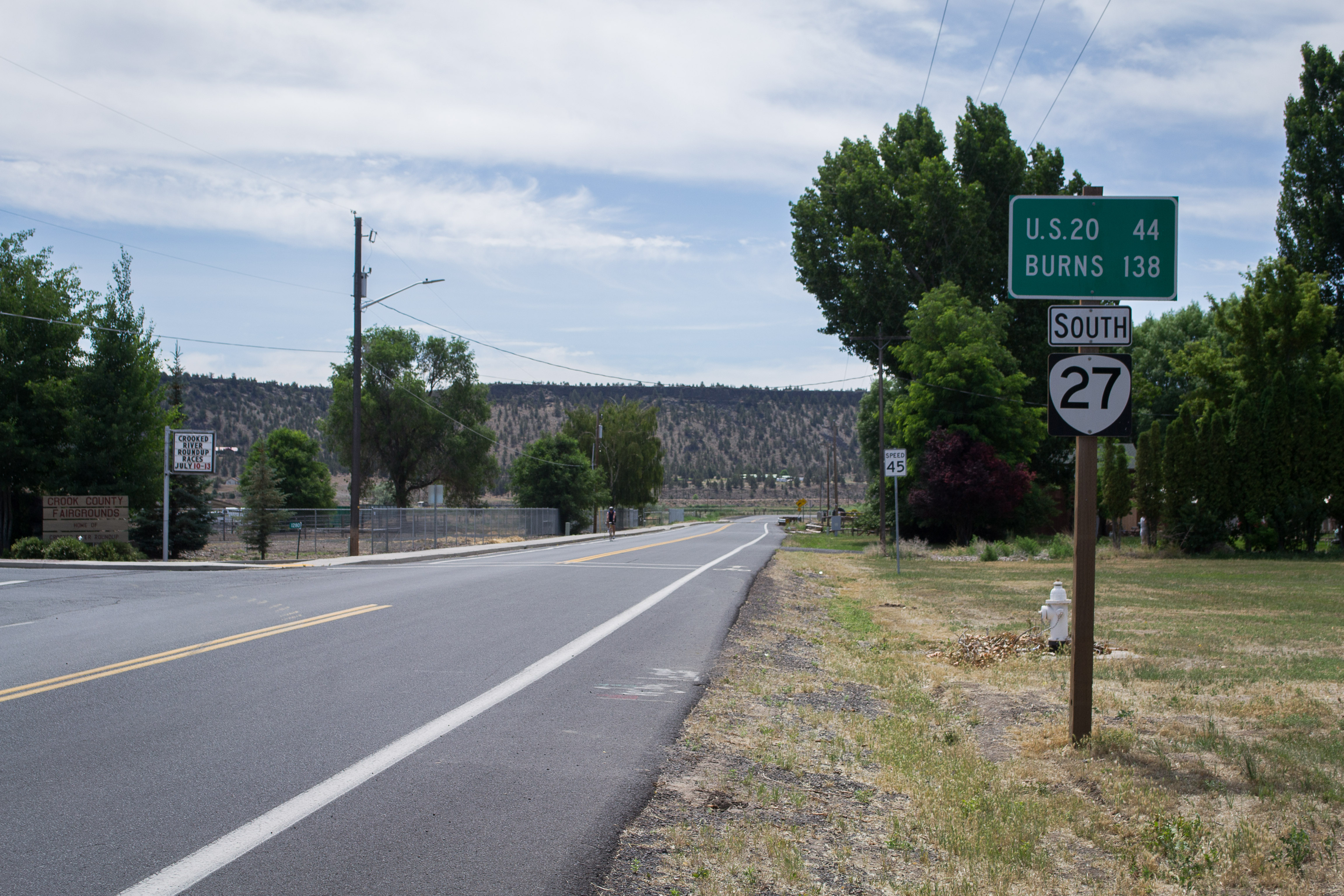
Oregon Route 27 in Prineville, Oregon

Oregon Route 27 is an Oregon state highway located in Deschutes County and Crook County. OR 27 traverses the Crooked River Highway No. 14 of the Oregon state highway system. Known as the Lower Crooked River Back Country Byway, OR 27 has the distinction of being one of the only state highways in Oregon which is partially paved: out of its 44.79-mile (72.08 km) total length, an 18.5-mile (29.8 km) stretch of the highway is gravel.

== Route description ==
OR 27 has its southern terminus at a junction with U.S. Route 20 at Brothers, east of Bend. It runs north, along the Crooked River, towards Prineville Reservoir and the city of Prineville. It terminates in Prineville at a junction with U.S. Route 26.

There have been numerous proposals over the years to pave the highway in its entirety; but no such projects have been undertaken due to lack of funding.

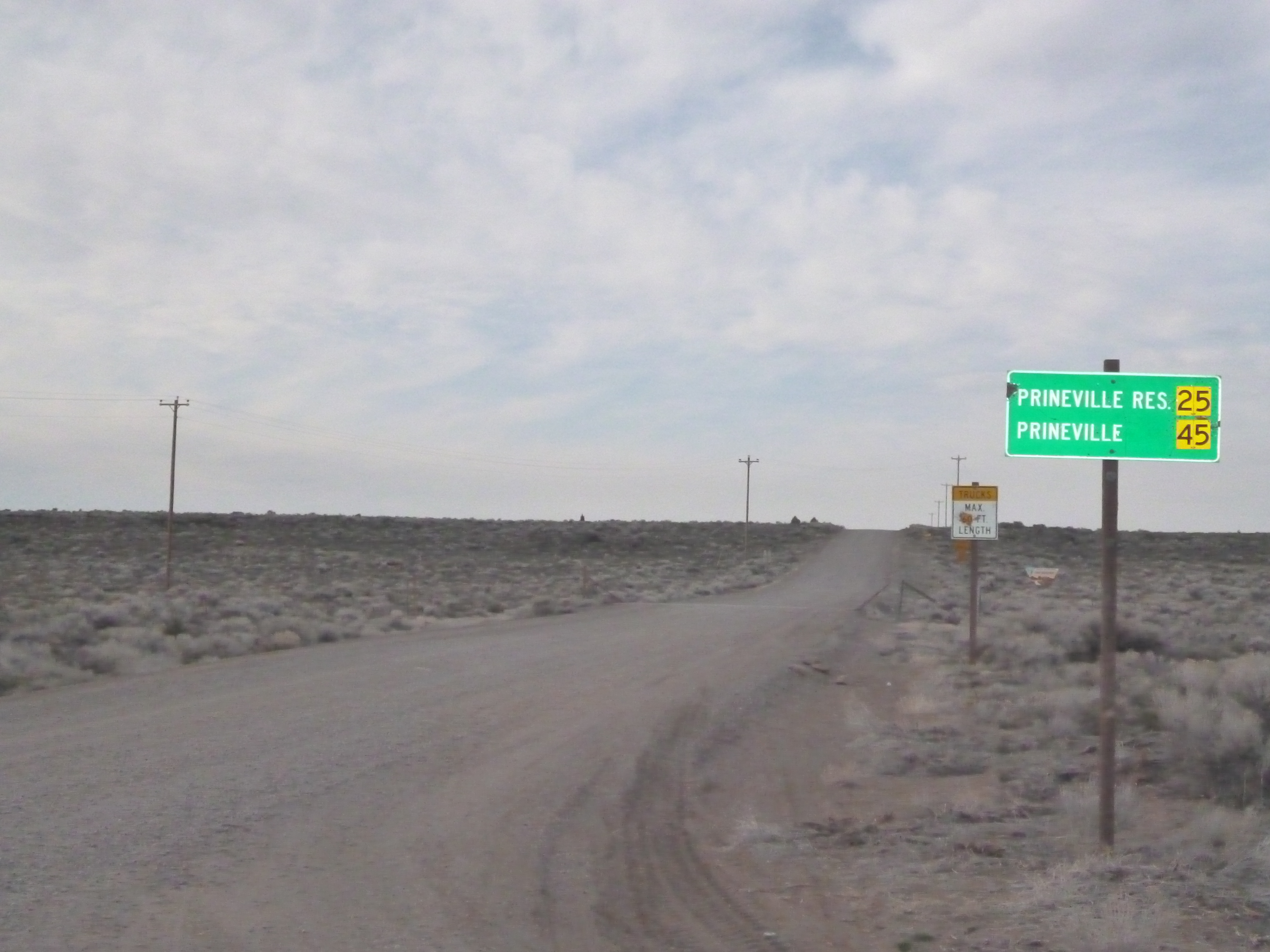
Southern terminus of Route 27

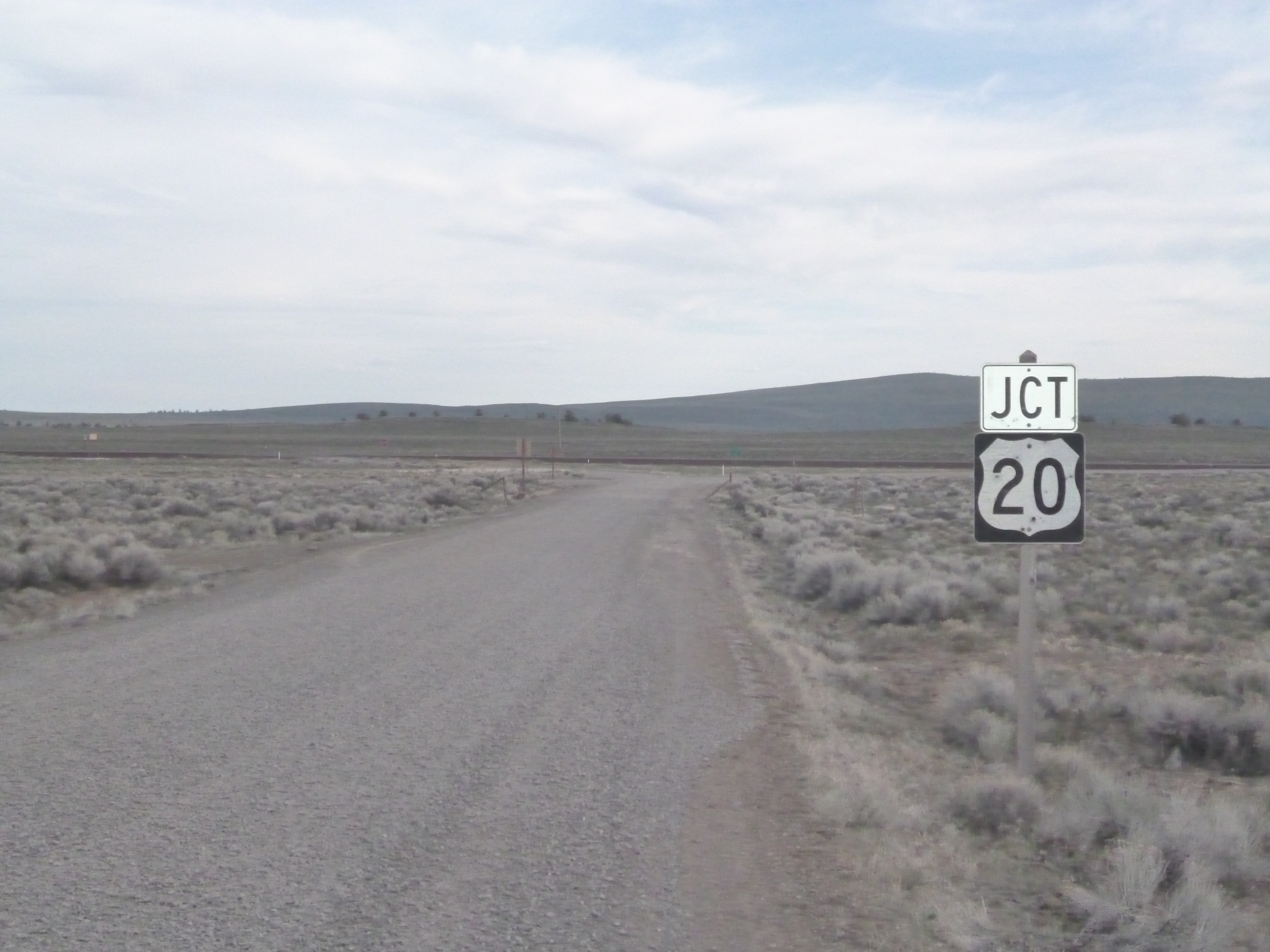
Southern end of Route 27

== History ==
A small section of the highway was rerouted in 1961 when Prineville Reservoir was created and covered the roadway.

OR 27 used to extend further northwest to the town of Metolius, roughly following the present US 26.

== Major intersections ==
Milepoints are as reported by ODOT and do not necessarily reflect current mileage. Z indicates overlapping mileage due to construction longer than established route, and – indicates negative mileage behind established beginning point. Segments that are locally maintained may be omitted. For routes traversing multiple named state highways, each milepoint is preceded by the corresponding state highway number.

County	Location	Milepoint	Destinations	Notes
Deschutes		42.51	US 20 – Bend, Brothers	
Crook	No major junctions			
Deschutes	No major junctions			
Crook		19.84– 19.59	Bowman Dam; Spillway Crooked River	
Crook	Prineville	0.00	US 26	
1.000 mi = 1.609 km; 1.000 km = 0.621 mi
