= Mount Vernon, Oregon =

Mt. Vernon, Oregon
- City
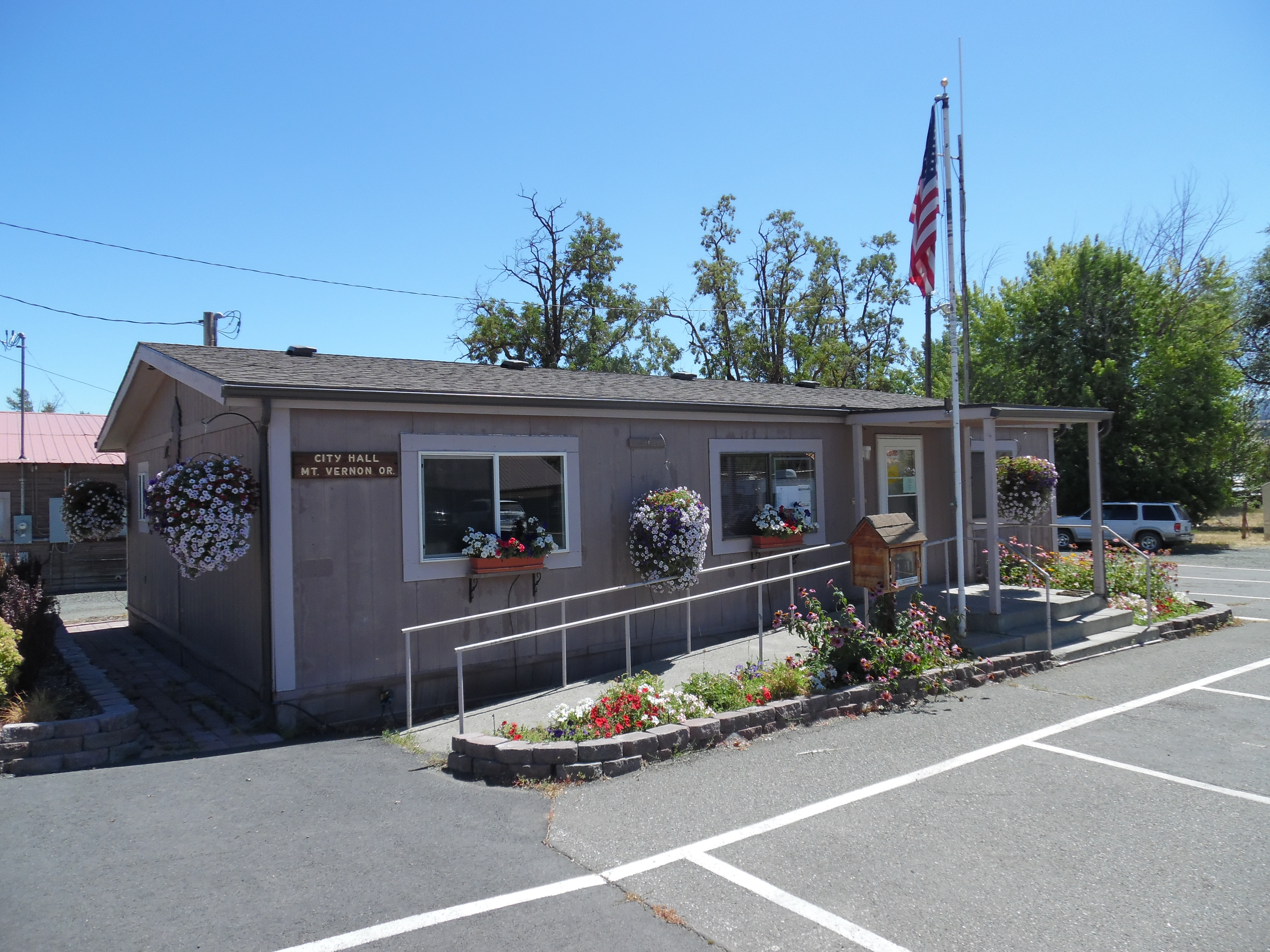
- Mount Vernon City Hall

- Location in Oregon
- Coordinates: 44°25′01″N 119°06′47″W
- Country: United States
- State: Oregon
- County: Grant
- Incorporated: 1948

Government
  - Mayor: Kenny Delano

Area
  - Total: 0.68 sq mi (1.77 km^{2})
  - Land: 0.68 sq mi (1.77 km^{2})
  - Water: 0 sq mi (0.00 km^{2})
- Elevation: 2,861 ft (872 m)

Population (2020)
  - Total: 548
  - Density: 802.8/sq mi (309.97/km^{2})
- Time zone: UTC-8 (Pacific)
  - Summer (DST): UTC-7 (Pacific)
- ZIP code: 97865
- Area code: 541
- FIPS code: 41-50250
- GNIS feature ID: 2411182
- Website: www.cityofmtvernonor.com

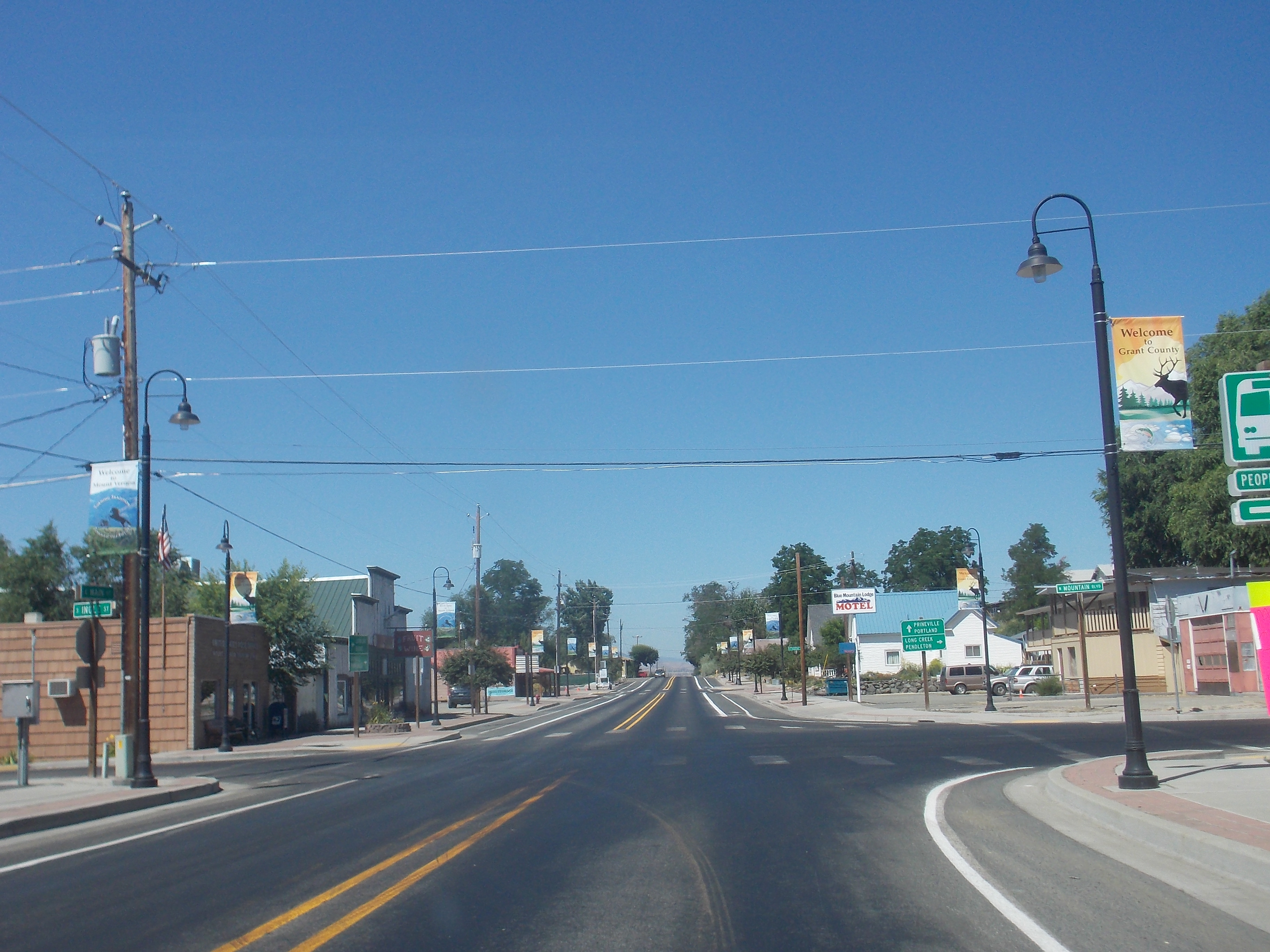
Mount Vernon

Mount Vernon is a city in Grant County, Oregon, United States. Its post office was established in 1877 and named after a black stallion that belonged to settler David W. Jenkins. The stallion's stable, a small stone building, is still standing in a field on the north side of U.S. Highway 26 about 2.2 miles (3.5 km) east of the main intersection in town. In 1915 the ranching community had a population of 60 and a hotel at a hot springs resort approximately 2 miles (3.2 km) north. The population had grown to 451 by the 1950 census. There are a few motels and restaurants in Mount Vernon. As of the 2020 census, Mount Vernon had a population of 548.

== Geography ==
According to the United States Census Bureau, the city has a total area of 0.68 square miles (1.76 km^{2}), all land. It is located along U.S. Route 26 on the John Day River about 8 miles (13 km) west of the city of John Day.

== Demographics ==
Historical population
Census	Pop.	Note	%±
1950	451		—
1960	502		11.3%
1970	423		−15.7%
1980	569		34.5%
1990	538		−5.4%
2000	595		10.6%
2010	527		−11.4%
2020	548		4.0%
U.S. Decennial Census

=== 2020 census ===
As of the 2020 census, Mount Vernon had a population of 548. The median age was 50.3 years. 19.2% of residents were under the age of 18 and 27.7% of residents were 65 years of age or older. For every 100 females there were 97.8 males, and for every 100 females age 18 and over there were 94.3 males age 18 and over.

0% of residents lived in urban areas, while 100.0% lived in rural areas.

There were 247 households in Mount Vernon, of which 21.9% had children under the age of 18 living in them. Of all households, 44.1% were married-couple households, 19.8% were households with a male householder and no spouse or partner present, and 29.1% were households with a female householder and no spouse or partner present. About 35.6% of all households were made up of individuals and 22.7% had someone living alone who was 65 years of age or older.

There were 264 housing units, of which 6.4% were vacant. Among occupied housing units, 67.2% were owner-occupied and 32.8% were renter-occupied. The homeowner vacancy rate was <0.1% and the rental vacancy rate was 5.7%.

Racial composition as of the 2020 census
Race	Number	Percent
White	499	91.1%
Black or African American	1	0.2%
American Indian and Alaska Native	2	0.4%
Asian	0	0%
Native Hawaiian and Other Pacific Islander	1	0.2%
Some other race	6	1.1%
Two or more races	39	7.1%
Hispanic or Latino (of any race)	23	4.2%

=== 2010 census ===
As of the census of 2010, there were 527 people, 259 households, and 151 families residing in the city. The population density was 775.0 inhabitants per square mile (299.2/km^{2}). There were 281 housing units at an average density of 413.2 per square mile (159.5/km^{2}). The racial makeup of the city was 95.4% White, 0.2% Native American, 0.2% Asian, 1.7% from other races, and 2.5% from two or more races. Hispanic or Latino of any race were 3.0% of the population.

There were 259 households, of which 21.2% had children under the age of 18 living with them, 44.4% were married couples living together, 9.7% had a female householder with no husband present, 4.2% had a male householder with no wife present, and 41.7% were non-families. 34.7% of all households were made up of individuals, and 18.1% had someone living alone who was 65 years of age or older. The average household size was 2.03 and the average family size was 2.61.

The median age in the city was 49 years. 19.7% of residents were under the age of 18; 4.1% were between the ages of 18 and 24; 20.1% were from 25 to 44; 33.9% were from 45 to 64; and 22.2% were 65 years of age or older. The gender makeup of the city was 49.7% male and 50.3% female.

=== 2000 census ===
As of the census of 2000, there were 595 people, 248 households, and 162 families residing in the city. The population density was 856.1 inhabitants per square mile (330.5/km^{2}). There were 270 housing units at an average density of 388.5 per square mile (150.0/km^{2}). The racial makeup of the city was 94.29% White, 0.17% African American, 1.85% Native American, and 3.70% from two or more races. Hispanic or Latino of any race were 2.18% of the population.

There were 248 households, out of which 31.0% had children under the age of 18 living with them, 51.6% were married couples living together, 11.3% had a female householder with no husband present, and 34.3% were non-families. 29.4% of all households were made up of individuals, and 12.5% had someone living alone who was 65 years of age or older. The average household size was 2.40 and the average family size was 2.97.

In the city, the population was spread out, with 28.2% under the age of 18, 6.7% from 18 to 24, 26.9% from 25 to 44, 24.5% from 45 to 64, and 13.6% who were 65 years of age or older. The median age was 38 years. For every 100 females, there were 90.7 males. For every 100 females age 18 and over, there were 83.3 males.

The median income for a household in the city was $31,635, and the median income for a family was $32,083. Males had a median income of $33,611 versus $17,292 for females. The per capita income for the city was $13,241. About 13.7% of families and 13.8% of the population were below the poverty line, including 21.5% of those under age 18 and 3.1% of those age 65 or over.

== Education ==
It is in the John Day School District (a.k.a. the Grant School District).
