= Unused highway =

Roads that were closed or never used

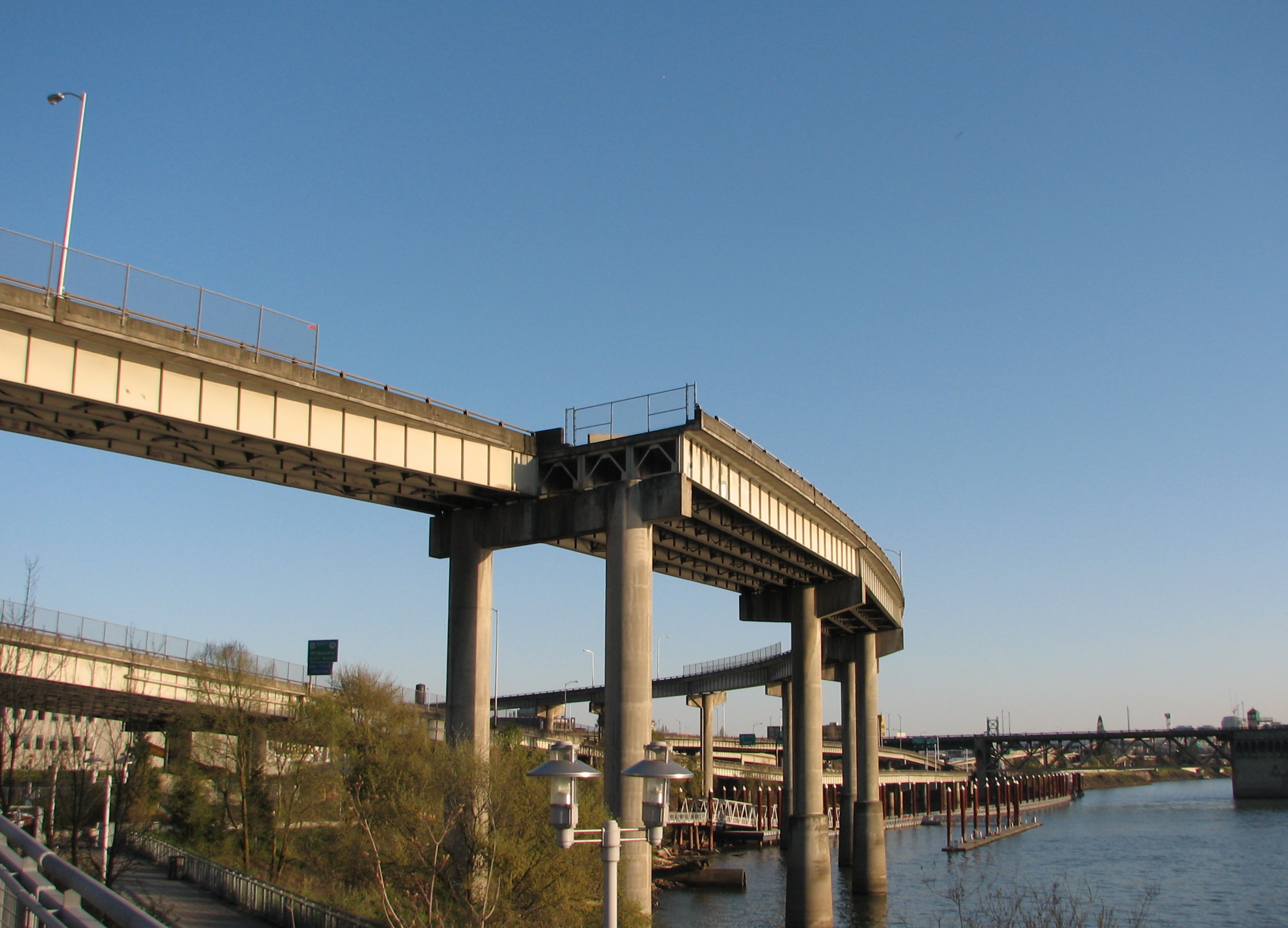
A now-unused ramp in Portland, Oregon at the western terminus of I-84 on the east bank of the Willamette River formerly a connection to US99W/Steel Bridge

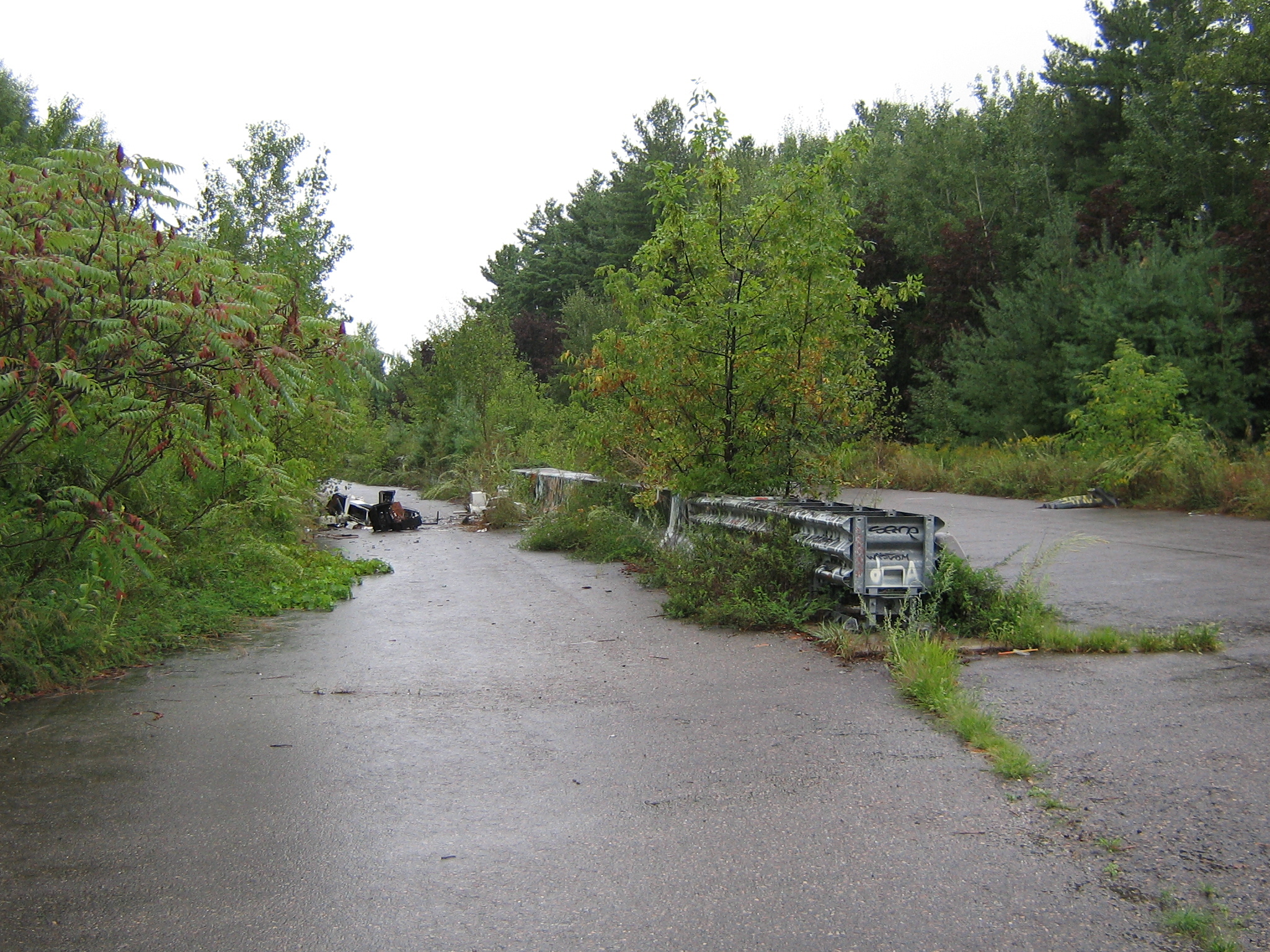
An unused section of divided highway approaching Interstate 189 in Burlington, Vermont (looking southward from: 44°26′57″N 73°13′3″W); some lanes are now blocked by discarded electronics; VTDOT has since begun work to make this segment part of Champlain Parkway.

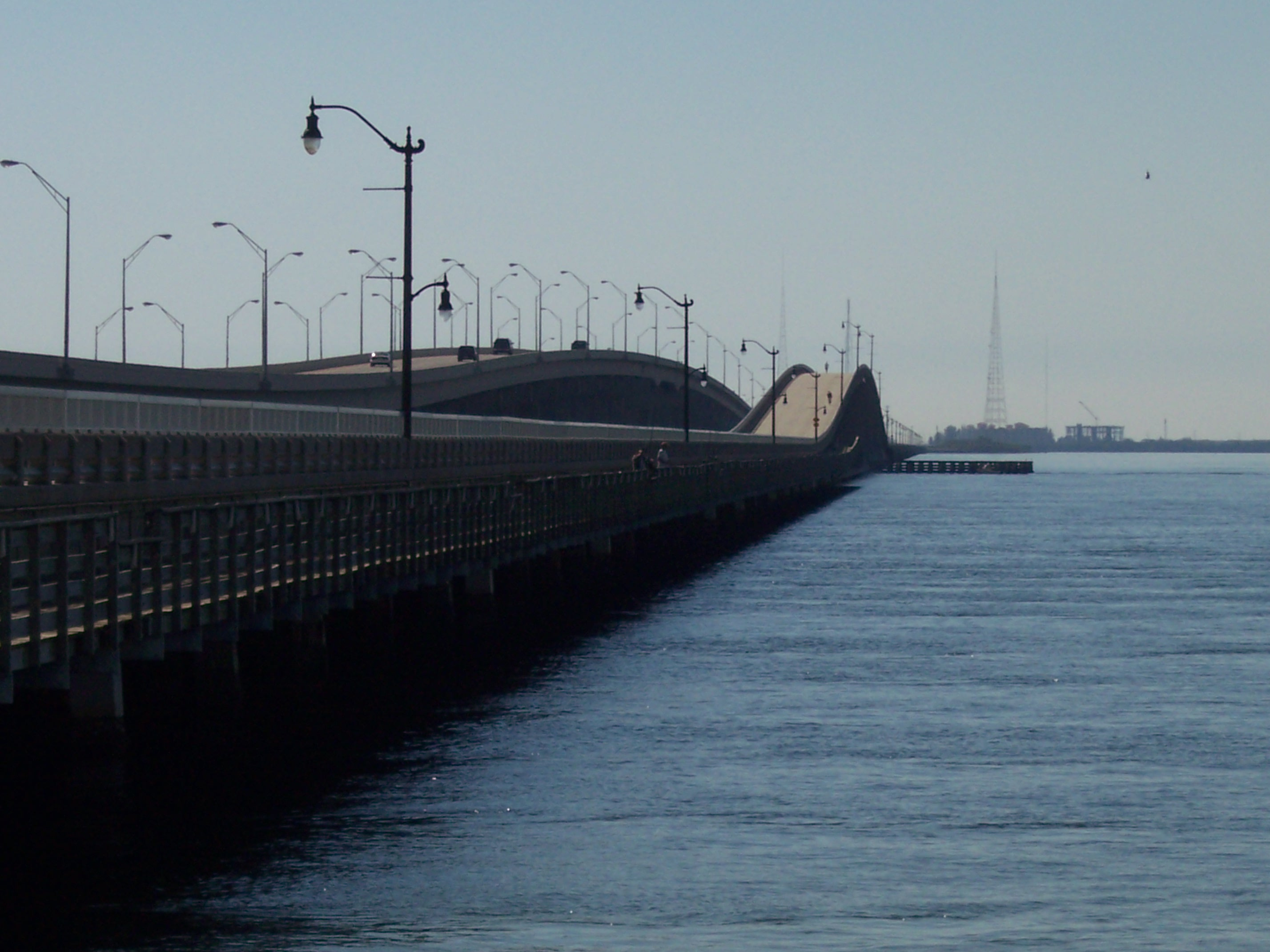
The 1956 span of the Gandy Bridge between Tampa and St. Petersburg was closed to traffic in 1997 and used as a recreational trail from 1999 until 2008, when it was closed for safety reasons. It remained in place as officials decided between demolition or renovation. In 2015, demolition of the unused bridge began.

An unused highway is a highway or highway ramp that was partially or fully constructed, but went unused or was later closed or part of a future expansion. An unused roadway or ramp may often be referred to as an abandoned road, ghost road, highway to nowhere, stub ramp, ghost ramp, ski jump, stub street, stub-out, or simply stub.

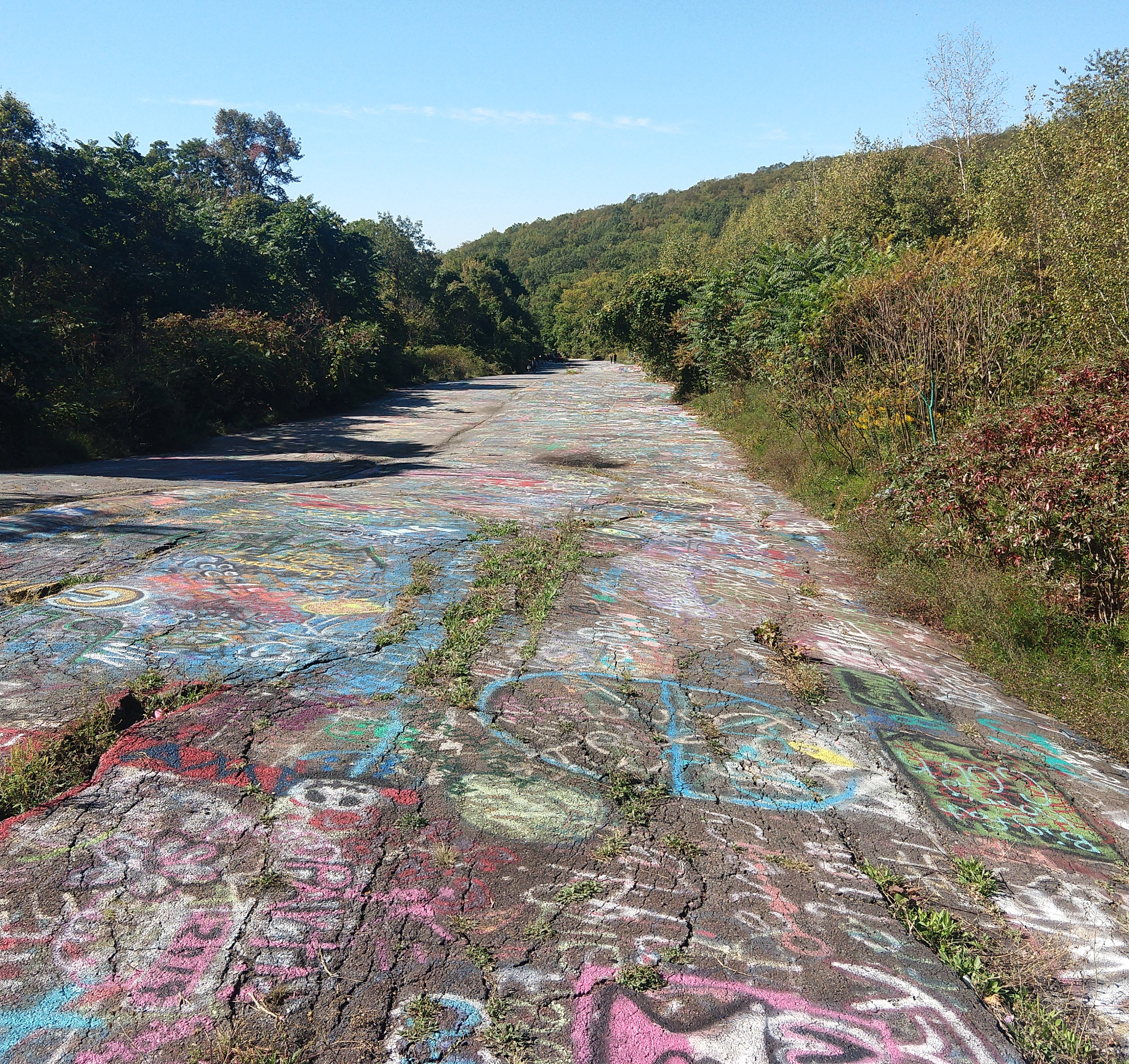
Abandoned section of Pennsylvania Route 61 covered in graffiti, which was abandoned due to the Centralia mine fire. In 2020, it was covered over with dirt.

== See also ==
- Bridge to nowhere
- Cul de sac
- Highway revolts
