= Congregation Shaarie Torah Cemetery =

Historic Jewish cemetery in Multnomah County, Oregon, US

- Interactive map of Congregation Shaarie Torah Cemetery

Details
- Location: Portland, Oregon
- Country: United States
- Coordinates: 45.46564°N 122.59518°W
- Find a Grave: Congregation Shaarie Torah Cemetery

Congregation Shaarie Torah Cemetery is an historic Jewish cemetery in southeast Portland, Oregon's Brentwood-Darlington neighborhood, in the United States.

== History ==
In 2003, the cemetery was desecrated by a self-described white supremacist and one other person.

== See also ==
- Beth Israel Cemetery (Portland, Oregon)
- Congregation Shaarie Torah
- History of the Jews in Oregon
