= History of the Jews in the American West =

Map of the American West

The 19th century saw Jews, like many other people, moving to the American West.

== Early history of Jewish congregations and community ==
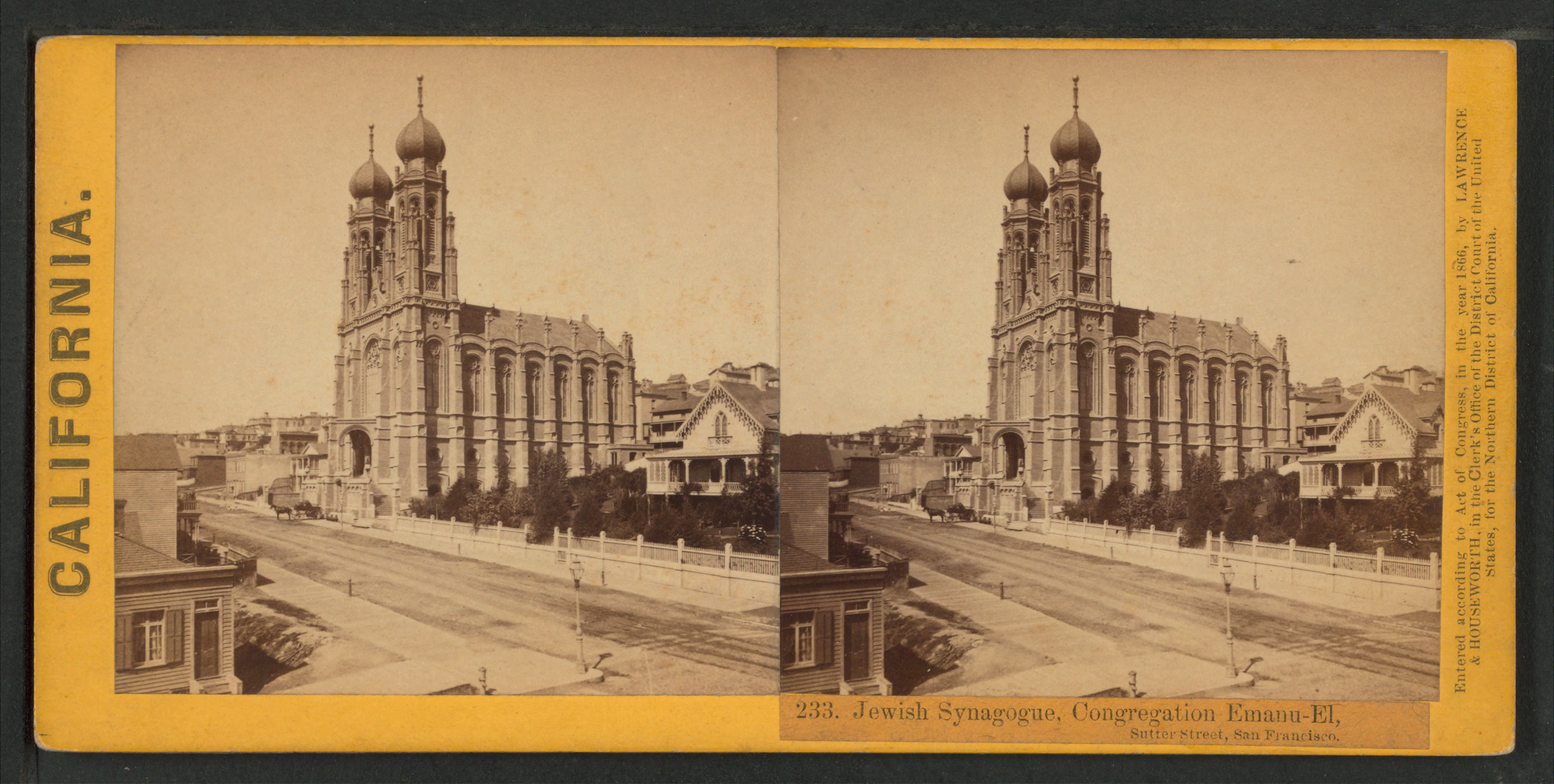
Congregation Emanu-El on Sutter Street (1866–1926), San Francisco

In the nineteenth-century, Jews began settling throughout the American West. The majority were immigrants, with German Jews comprising most of the early nineteenth-century wave of Jewish immigration to the United States and therefore to the Western states and territories, while Eastern European Jews migrated in greater numbers and comprised most of the migratory westward wave at the close of the century. Following the California Gold Rush of 1849, Jews established themselves prominently on the West Coast, with important settlements in Portland, Oregon; Seattle, Washington; and especially San Francisco, which became the second-largest Jewish city in the nation.

Eisenberg, Kahn, and Toll (2009) emphasize the creative freedom Jews found in western society, unburdening them from past traditions and opening up new opportunities for entrepreneurship, philanthropy, and civic leadership. Regardless of origin, many early Jewish settlers worked as peddlers before establishing themselves as merchants. Numerous entrepreneurs opened shop in large cities like San Francisco to service the mining industry, as well as in smaller communities like Deadwood, South Dakota and Bisbee, Arizona, which sprung up throughout the resource-rich West. The most popular specialty was clothing merchant, followed by the small-scale manufacturing and general retailing. For example, Levi Strauss (1829 – 1902) started as a wholesale dealer in with clothing, bedding, and notions; by 1873 he introduced the first blue jeans, an immediate hit for miners, and later, informal urban wear. Everyone was a newcomer, and the Jews were generally accepted with few signs of discrimination, according to Eisenberg, Kahn, and Toll (2009).

Though many Jewish immigrants to the West found success as merchants, others worked as bankers, miners, freighters, ranchers, and farmers. Otto Mears helped to build railroads across Colorado, while Solomon Bibo became the governor of the Acoma Pueblo Indians. Though these are by no means the only two Jewish immigrants to make names for themselves in the West, they help to showcase the wide variety of paths that Jewish settlers pursued. Organizations like the Hebrew Immigrant Aid Society and Baron Maurice de Hirsch's Jewish Agricultural Society served as a conduit for connecting Jewish newcomers arriving from Europe with settlements in the Upper Midwest, Southwest, and Far West. In other cases, family connections served as the primary network drawing more Jews to the West.

Jeanette Abrams argues persuasively that Jewish women played a prominent role in the establishment of Jewish communities throughout the West. For example, the first synagogue in Arizona, Tucson's Temple Emanu-El, was established by the local Hebrew Ladies Benevolent Society, as was the case for many synagogues in the West. Likewise, many Jewish activists and community leaders became prominent in municipal and state politics, winning election to public office with little attention paid to their Jewish identity. They set up Reform congregations and generally gave little support to Zionism down to the 1940s.

In the 20th century, Metropolitan Los Angeles became the second-largest Jewish base in the United States. The most dramatic cast of newcomers there was in Hollywood, where Jewish producers were the dominant force in the film industry after 1920.

=== San Francisco, California ===
In 1849, the first Jewish service of San Francisco began as a minyan at Lewis Abraham Franklin's tent store on Jackson Street at Kearny Street, with 30 Jews from Poland, Prussia, Bavaria and the Eastern United States, and was initially Orthodox. There have been ethnic and class differences within the Jewish community in San Francisco, which has spawned dispute on the earliest of history. In 1851, Congregation Emanu-El and Congregation Sherith Israel of San Francisco were joined as a single synagogue; but soon after they split into two congregations.

Congregation Emanu-El was mostly Bavarian German immigrants, and Congregation Sherith Israel was mostly immigrants from Eastern Europe, Poland, and England.

By 1855, Congregation Emanu-El shifted from Orthodox to Liberal Judaism. In 1860, a Reform rabbi, Elkan Cohn, arrived to lead the Emanu-El congregation, and in 1877, it was the first congregation in the West to join the Reform movement. From 1866 to 1926, Congregation Emanu-El's synagogue was on Sutter Street, it was grand in scale and had twin octagonal towers topped by bronze-plated domes.

=== San Diego, California ===
Lewis Abraham Franklin moved from San Francisco to San Diego in 1851, and that fall he organized the first High Holiday services in Southern California. During the first services in Southern California, Franklin was joined by Mark Israel Jacobs and Charles A. Fletcher.

=== Portland, Oregon ===
Jacob Goldsmith and Lewis May were the earliest Jews settling in Portland, Oregon; in 1849 the two German-born immigrants established a general store in the city. Despite having an early arrive in the state of Oregon, it took almost a decade to establish a synagogue in the state. The first synagogue built in 1861 by Congregation Beth Israel in Portland. In 1869, a second synagogue was built for Congregation Ahavai Sholom also of Portland.

== Jewish politicians ==
There were over 30 Jewish mayors in the late 1800s and early 1900s.

=== California ===
Adolph Sutro, a Jewish tradesman from Prussia, ran as the "Anti-Octopus" candidate and served one term as the Mayor of San Francisco in 1895 to 1897.

The first Jewish congresswoman in the United States was Florence Kahn, who represented California's 4th district from December 1925 to January 1937, succeeding her husband, Julius Kahn, after he died in the middle of his 12th term. In addition to being a congresswoman, she taught English and history to high school students. She was involved in many Jewish organizations, and motivated women across California to participate in politics.

=== Oregon ===
In 1869, Bernard Goldsmith, an immigrant Jew from Bavaria, became the mayor of Portland, Oregon.

=== Idaho ===
Charles Himrod served as mayor of Boise, Idaho Territory, for two terms in the 1860s and 1870s. Moses Alexander was the second person elected Jewish governor of a US state, serving as the 11th Governor of Idaho from 1915 until 1919.

=== Utah ===
Simon Bamberger was the third Jewish governor of a US State and the first non-Mormon to be elected Governor of Utah, serving as the 4th Governor of Utah (1917–1921) after it achieved statehood in 1896.

== Modern day ==
Today, California has one of the largest Jewish-American populations at about 1 million, and the state's main Jewish communities are found in Los Angeles (especially western parts of the city such as Westwood and Beverly Hills) and the San Francisco Bay Area (especially San Francisco and Berkeley). Recent Russian Jewish immigrants are settling in urban Jewish communities, such as the state capital of Sacramento and a smaller Jewish community in Palm Springs.

== See also ==
- History of the Jews in Oregon
