= Sweet Lorraine's =

Defunct restaurant in Portland, Oregon, U.S.

- Interactive map of Sweet Lorraine's

Restaurant information
- Established: February 2021
- Closed: May 26, 2024
- Owners: Aaron Tomasko; Rachel Brashear
- Food type: Ashkenazi Jewish
- Location: Portland, Multnomah, Oregon, United States
- Coordinates: 45.5244°N 122.6781°W
- Website: sweetlorraineslatkes.squarespace.com

Sweet Lorraine's Latkes & More, or simply Sweet Lorraine's, was a restaurant in Portland, Oregon. Spouses Aaron Tomasko and Rachel Brashear began operating the food cart in February 2021, initially serving latkes and later expanding to include other Ashkenazi Jewish cuisine such as matzah brei, kasha varnishkes, knishes, noodle kugel, and sufganiyah.

In 2023, the business relocated multiple times, landing at Labyrinth Forge Brewery. Sweet Lorraine's began operating a second location within the Oregon Jewish Museum in 2024. After Labyrinth Forge Brewery went out of business in April, the owners of Sweet Lorraine's decided to end operations on May 26.

== Description ==
Inspired by the "dairy restaurants" (or luncheonettes following kosher law) of New York, Sweet Lorraine's operated from a food cart in Portland, initially serving latkes and later expanding to include other Ashkenazi Jewish cuisine such as matzah brei, kasha varnishkes, and noodle kugel. Brooke Jackson-Glidden of Eater Portland described Sweet Lorraine's as "one of the few dairy restaurants on the West Coast, and one of the few places in the city where folks can eat latkes and whitefish year round."

Sweet Lorraine's billed itself as the city's only Jewish dairy restaurant, serving "homestyle New York Jewish cuisine". The restaurant also served lox, potato knishes, egg sandwiches with challah, and sufganiyah. Gluten-free latkes were available, and latkes came with apple sauce or sour cream. Dessert options included black-and-white cookies, a cake similar to a "devil dog", and egg creams.

== History ==
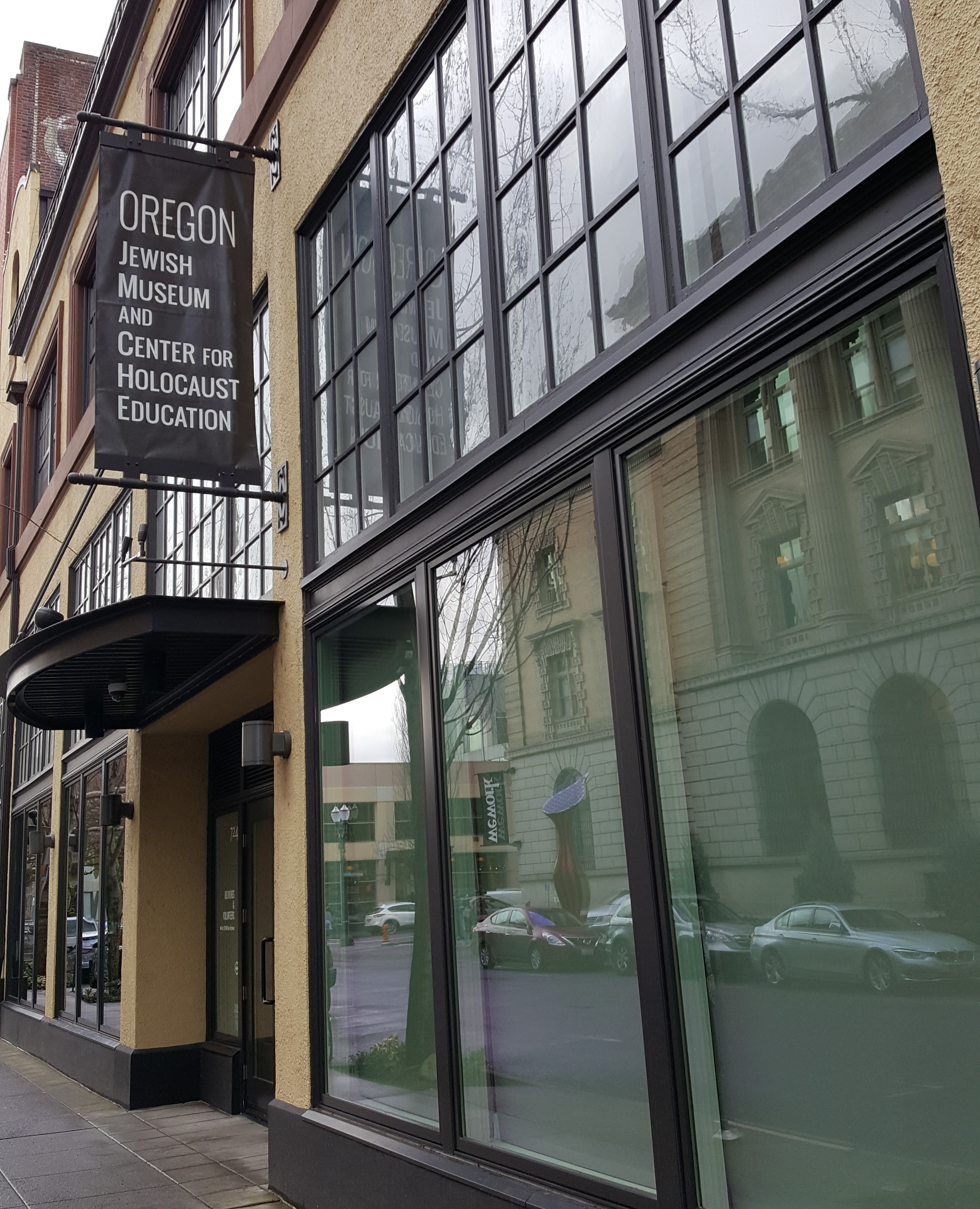
Sweet Lorraine's began operating at the Oregon Jewish Museum (exterior pictured in 2018) in 2024

Spouses Aaron Tomasko and Rachel Brashear, who had previously worked as musicians and teachers, opened Sweet Lorraine's in February 2021, after the COVID-19 pandemic prompted them to change career paths. The business is named after Tomasko's grandmother, who also inspired the menu. In 2023, Sweet Lorraine's relocated from the Killingsworth Station food cart pod to others, then to Labyrinth Forge Brewery on Southeast Yamhill Street.

Sweet Lorraine's served poppy seed hamantash for Purim in 2022, and hosted a Hanukkah party in 2023. For Passover in 2024, a temporary menu featured coconut macaroons, matzo brei, matzo toffee, smoked salmon dip, tzimmes, and vegetarian matzo ball soup.

In February 2024, the business announced plans to expand to Lefty's, the cafe inside the Oregon Jewish Museum. The two locations operated until April 13, when Labyrinth Forge Brewing went out of business.

In May, Tomasko and Brashear announced plans to close on May 26. Citing increased operations costs, the couple said "we're not sure how anyone can maintain the level of quality food and service we value without going into massive debt" and planned to continue working as musicians. Sweet Lorraine's closed at a time when there were few options for Jewish cuisine in the city, according to Brooke Jackson-Glidden of Eater Portland.

== See also ==
- History of the Jews in Oregon
- List of Ashkenazi Jewish restaurants
