= Bitar Mansion =

Historic building in Portland, Oregon, U.S.

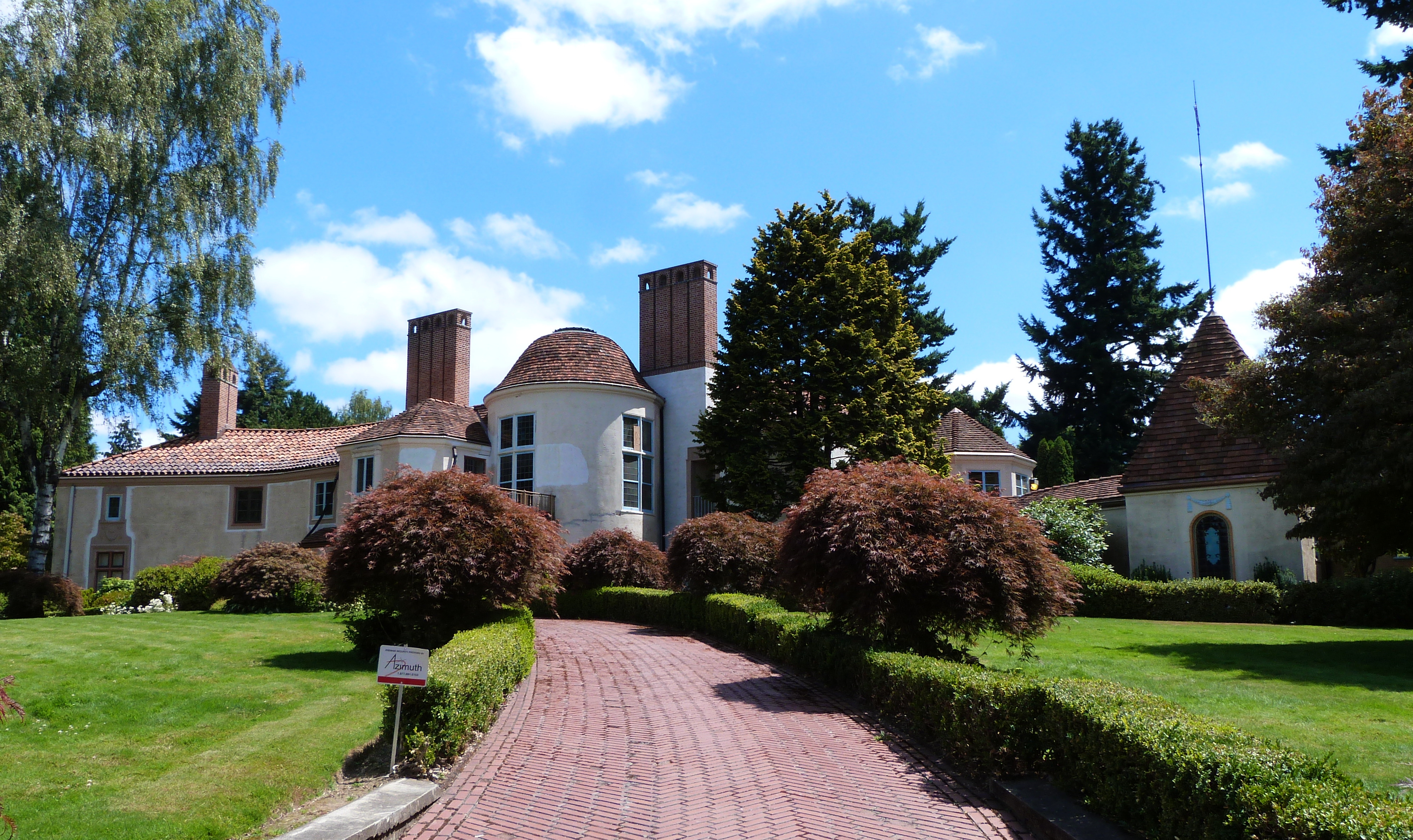
- The house in 2013

- Location within Portland, Oregon
- Former names: Harry A. Green House, Harry A. and Ada Green House

General information
- Type: House
- Architectural style: Byzantine-Romanesque, Mediterranean Revival
- Location: Portland, Oregon, U.S.
- Coordinates: 45.5218°N 122.6293°W
- Construction started: 1927

Technical details
- Floor area: c. 12,000 sq ft (1,100 m^{2})

Design and construction
- Architect: Herman Brookman

Other information
- Number of rooms: 17
- Harry A. and Ada Green House
- U.S. National Register of Historic Places
- Location: 3316 SE Ankeny Street; Portland, Oregon
- NRHP reference No.: 13000805
- Added to NRHP: September 30, 2013

Bitar Mansion, also known as Harry A. Green House or the Harry A. and Ada Green House, is a mansion in the Laurelhurst neighborhood of Portland, Oregon, United States. The 12,000-square-foot (1,100 m^{2}) and 17-room structure was designed by architect Herman Brookman and built in 1927 for $410,000, equivalent to $7.6 million today. The Mediterranean-style house contains a grand ballroom and many elaborate details. The mansion has views of the Tualatin Mountains and adjacent Laurelhurst Park.

Robert and Mable Bitar purchased the house in 1951. Robert later became an honorary consul to Lebanon and lived in the mansion until his death in 2000. The house went on the real estate market for the first time in 55 years in 2006 and was purchased in December 2006 for $1.825 million. As of 2011, the house remains the most expensive home sold in southeast Portland. The house was put on the market again and is up for auction in August 2011.

== Features ==
The Mediterranean-style mansion is on a property "the equivalent of seven standard city lots" adjacent to Laurelhurst Park and offers views of the Tualatin Mountains. The house contains a round tower, multiple chimneys, a red-tiled roof, bronzed iron gates, and Art Deco accents with a peacock motif. A bell-cast entrance tower, which contains a curved stairway and a vestibule, anchors "sweeping and curved low-pitched roofs". Next to the tower is the living room's fireplace chimney. To the right of the entrance hall is the formal living room that opens to the parterre overlooking Laurelhurst Park. To the entrance hall's left is the dining room, followed by a curved wing housing the kitchen, service areas and garages. The interior features a marble-floored ballroom, heated pool, servants wing, and elaborate woodwork, tile, metalwork and sculpture. Surrounding the French doors leading outside from the entrance hall are columns supporting paired peacocks cast in stone.

The house plan is influenced by English Arts and Crafts tradition. Italian influences are evidenced by the garden parterre in the backyard as well as the "medieval style" columns and arches at the breakfast room windows. Decorative embellishments along the main garden door suggest Art Deco and Spanish Plasteresque styles. Stuccoed walls, tiled roofs and metal-framed windows showcase Mediterranean style. The windows are three-paned vertically within each casement; feature windows have columns supporting Moorish-arched openings. The living and dining rooms contain large bay windows. Outside, an arcade leads to the swimming pool, where privacy from the street is provided by a pyramid-roofed bath house and garden walls. According to William J. Hawkins, III and William F. Willingham, these elements "add to the unity of the entire architectural composition, giving a handsome facade to the public street, yet providing a great variety of private spaces behind the house and walled gardens to the rear." The architect, Herman Brookman, also designed the Congregation Beth Israel and Fir Acres, the M. Lloyd Frank Estate that became Lewis & Clark College, both in Portland. Brookman mixed architectural styles, as evidenced by the many influences seen in Bitar Mansion.

== History ==
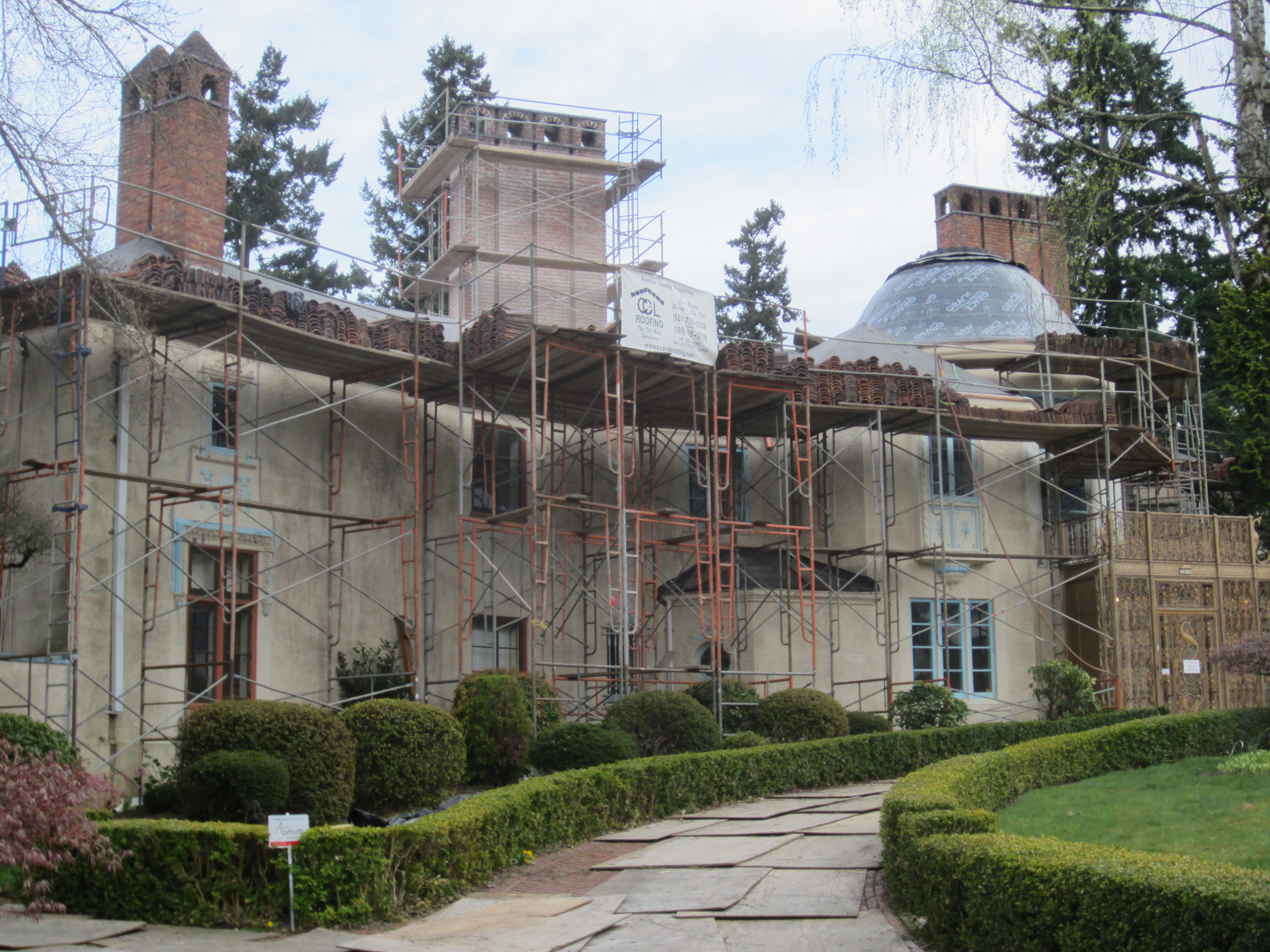
The mansion following foreclosure, April 2012

Robert and Mable Bitar purchased the house in 1951. Robert recalled that as a young boy he vowed to one day own the house. A grocery store owner and real estate investor, Robert later became an honorary consul to Lebanon and lived in the mansion until his death in 2000. While owned by the Bitar family, the home hosted First Lady Eleanor Roosevelt, pianist Van Cliburn and many state governors and U.S. senators.

The house was placed on the real estate market in 2006, the first time in 55 years, and sold for $1.825 million after being valued at $3.99 million by an assessor for Multnomah County. The new owners began to restore the mansion to its original condition with building renovations and searching for furnishings in the original Doernbecher style. Since 2010, the house has fallen into disrepair and been foreclosed. On August 22, 2011, the house was auctioned off at the Multnomah County Courthouse. The property was purchased by ReconTrust Company, an affiliate of Bank of America, for $1.605 million. In December 2011 the home sold for $870,000. Willamette Week included the house on their "Best of Portland 2012" list as the "Best Barometer of the Real Estate Market", signifying the bottom of the economic market.

As of 2011, the house remains the most expensive sold in Southeast Portland.

== See also ==
- Architecture of Portland, Oregon
- National Register of Historic Places listings in Southeast Portland, Oregon
- Pittock Mansion, a 1909 Portland mansion
