= Vicki Stone =

American painter

- Born: 1949 (age 76–77)
- Known for: Painter
- Movement: Folk art
- Spouse: Jim Stone

Vicki Stone (born 1949) is an American folk artist. Her work has been featured in exhibitions at the Hurn Museum in Savannah, Georgia, the Los Angeles Craft and Folk Art Museum, and the Geezer Gallery in Multnomah Village, Oregon.

== Work ==
Stone creates paintings, ceramics, and hand-hooked wall hangings. Her themes include family, motherhood, biblical imagery, and images drawn from Judaism.

The American Visionary Art Museum, the Hurn Museum, the Mennello Museum of American Art, and the Oregon Jewish Museum have her work in their collections.

== Personal ==
A native of Chicago, Stone currently resides in Portland, Oregon. She is a member of the Oregon Jewish Folk Arts Society, and delivered that society's inaugural lecture in 2009. She and her husband, Jim, are Orthodox Jews, having become baalei teshuva in 1988; they are affiliated with Chabad of Oregon. They have a son, Ari, who moved to Israel in 2007.
