= Gilda's =

Gilda's may refer to:

- Gildas
- Gilda's Club
- Gilda's Italian Restaurant, Portland, Oregon, U.S.
