= Congregation Shaarie Torah =

Jewish congregation and synagogue in Portland, Oregon

Shaarie Torah
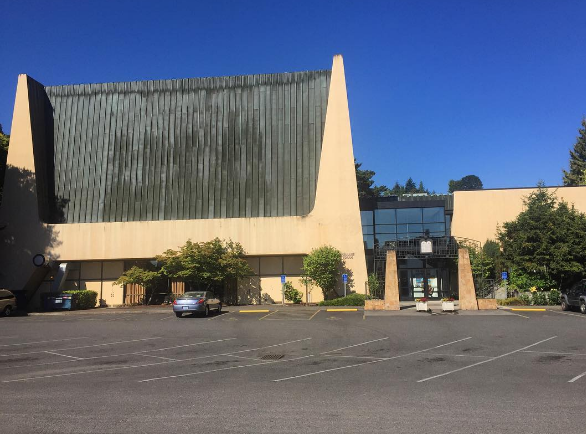
- Shaarie Torah synagogue

- Location in Portland, Oregon

Religion
- Affiliation: Conservative Judaism
- Ecclesiastical or organisational status: Synagogue
- Leadership: Rabbi Gary Oren
- Status: Active

Location
- Location: 920 Northwest 25th Avenue, Portland, Oregon
- Country: United States
- Coordinates: 45°31′46″N 122°42′07″W

Architecture
- Established: 1905 (as a congregation)
- Completed: c. 1905 (First Avenue); 1960 (demolished); 1965 (current synagogue)

Website
- shaarietorah.org

Shaarie Torah is a Conservative Jewish congregation and synagogue located at 920 Northwest 25th Avenue, in Portland, Oregon, in the United States.

== History ==
The congregation was founded in 1905, and shortly after, the congregation purchased a Presbyterian Church on SW Third Avenue and moved it to First Avenue, south of Hall Street. The building was refurbished and became the first official home of Shaarie Torah.

A new synagogue opened on May 15, 1960, at Park Avenue and Jackson Street, but it was demolished a few years later due to the construction of Interstate 405. The current synagogue at 920 Northwest 25th Avenue was dedicated on June 13, 1965.

== See also ==
- Culture of Portland, Oregon
- History of the Jews in Oregon
- Oregon Jewish Museum
- Religion in Portland, Oregon
