= Abshalom Jac Lahav =

American painter (born 1977)

Abshalom Jac Lahav אבשלום ג'ֵק להב
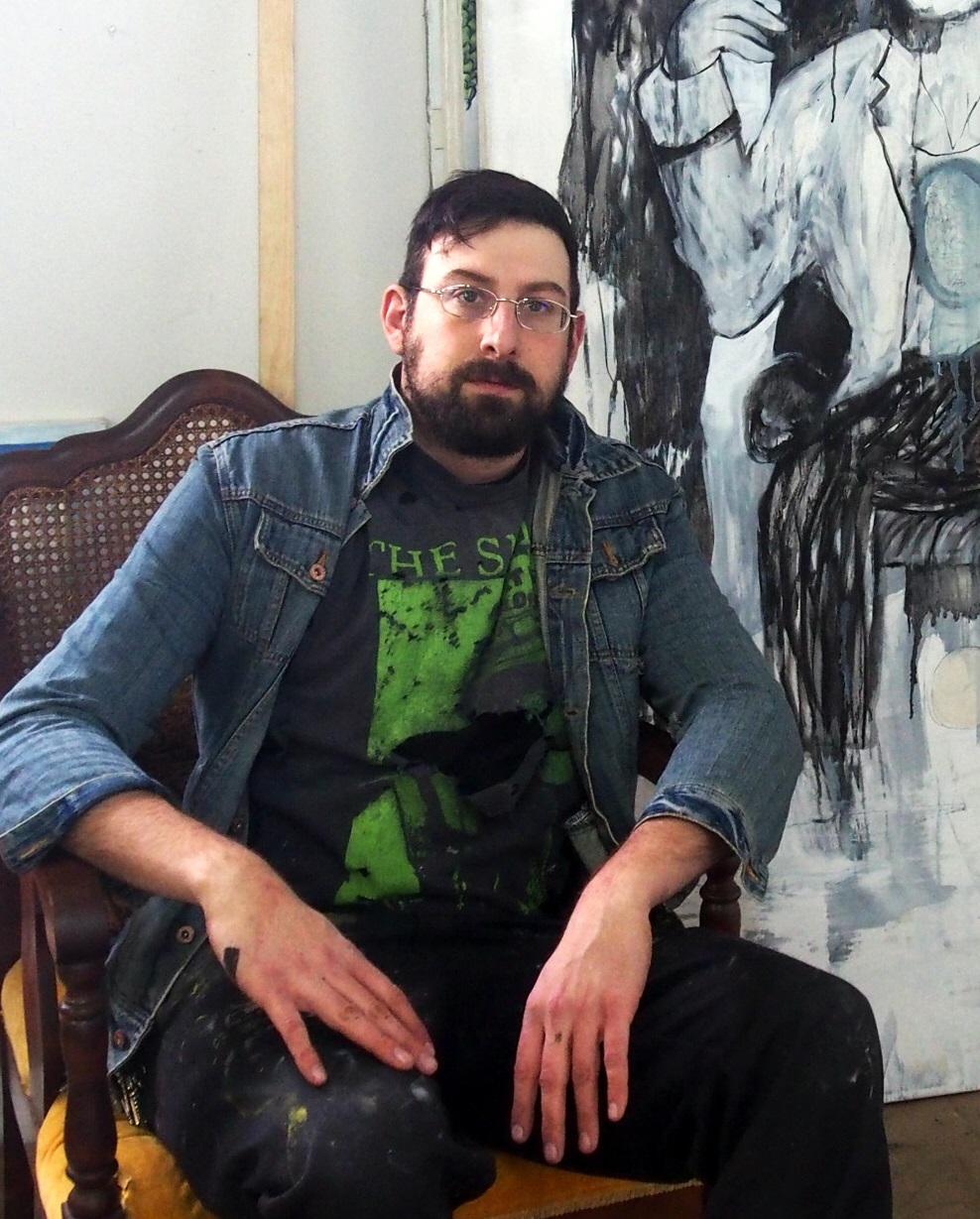
- Born: April 4, 1977 (age 49); Jerusalem, Israel
- Education: Wesleyan University, School of Visual Arts, Cooper Union, Brooklyn College
- Known for: Painting
- Notable work: 48 Jews, The Great Americans, Slaves
- Website: www.jaclahav.com

Abshalom Jac Lahav (Hebrew: אבשלום ג'ֵק להב; born April 4, 1977) is a New York City–based artist. He is known for his series 48 Jews and The Great Americans which have been shown at museums such as Richmond Art Museum, Samuel Dorsky Museum of Art, The Oregon Jewish Museum and Jewish Museum of Florida. His painting style implements well known images of famous people in the modern contexts, but still references historical modes of painting and black-and-white photography through its use of monotone imagery. He is also the founder of the Midnight Society, an artist run curatorial project based in Brooklyn, New York.

== Early life ==
Lahav was born in Jerusalem, Israel in 1977, to Pnina and Moshe Lahav. He lived in Israel before his parents settled in Boston, Massachusetts. He attended undergraduate at Wesleyan University where he was a member of the Eclectic Society.

== Education ==
In 2000, Lahav received a Bachelor of Arts degree in psychology from Wesleyan University, Connecticut. He studied painting at the School of Visual Arts and Cooper Union and received his Master of Fine Arts degree from Brooklyn College, New York in 2008 where he studied under Vito Acconci and Keith Mayerson.

== Career ==
Lahav began his career at the Jewish Museum, New York in an exhibition entitled Art Image and Warhol Connections, showing alongside Deborah Kass, Alex Katz, and Ben Shahn, the exhibition presented works by seven artists who directly respond to Andy Warhol.

His series of paintings 48 Jews and The Great Americans employ portraiture to question basic assumptions about the relationship of historical memory and collective identity. These works have been shown in several museums across the United States. 48 Jews is a series of Warhol-esque portrait paintings of famous Jews that examines the representation of Jews in the diaspora while The Great Americans is the combination of American heroic, pop culture and history painting.

In 2008, Lahav started an experimental painting series on Anne Frank. The series questions the long afterlife of Anne Frank's portrait and explored the intersection of pop culture and art history.

His curatorial endeavors have been shown at the Spring/Break Art Show two years in a row where his project received attention from Bill Cunningham.

== Selected solo exhibitions ==
- Koslowe Gallery, Westchester NY, 2014
- Richmond Art Museum, Richmond Indiana, The Great Americans, 2011
- Jewish Museum of Florida, Miami Florida, 48 Jews, 2010
- Oregon Jewish Museum, Portland Oregon, 48 Jews, 2009
- Jarmuschek + Partner, Berlin, Germany, 48 Jews: Selections from the Series, 2009
- Gallery 532 Thomas Jaeckel, NY, NY. The Great Americans, 2009
- Gallery 532 Thomas Jaeckel, NY, NY. Boundless, 2009
- Esther Prangley Rice Gallery, McDaniel College's, Md, 2007
