= Herman Brookman =

American architect (1891–1973)

- Born: July 2, 1891; New York City, New York, U.S.
- Died: November 6, 1973 (aged 82)
- Occupation: Architect

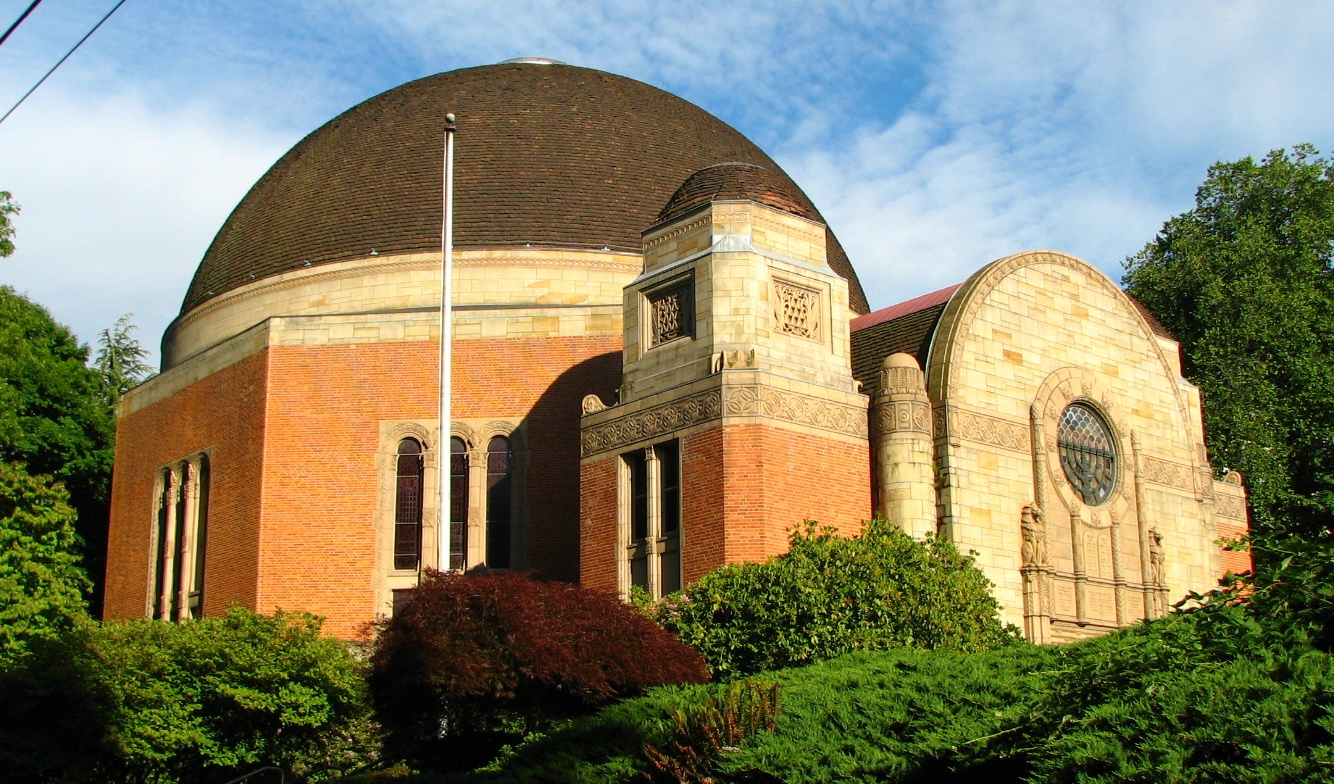
Temple Beth Israel

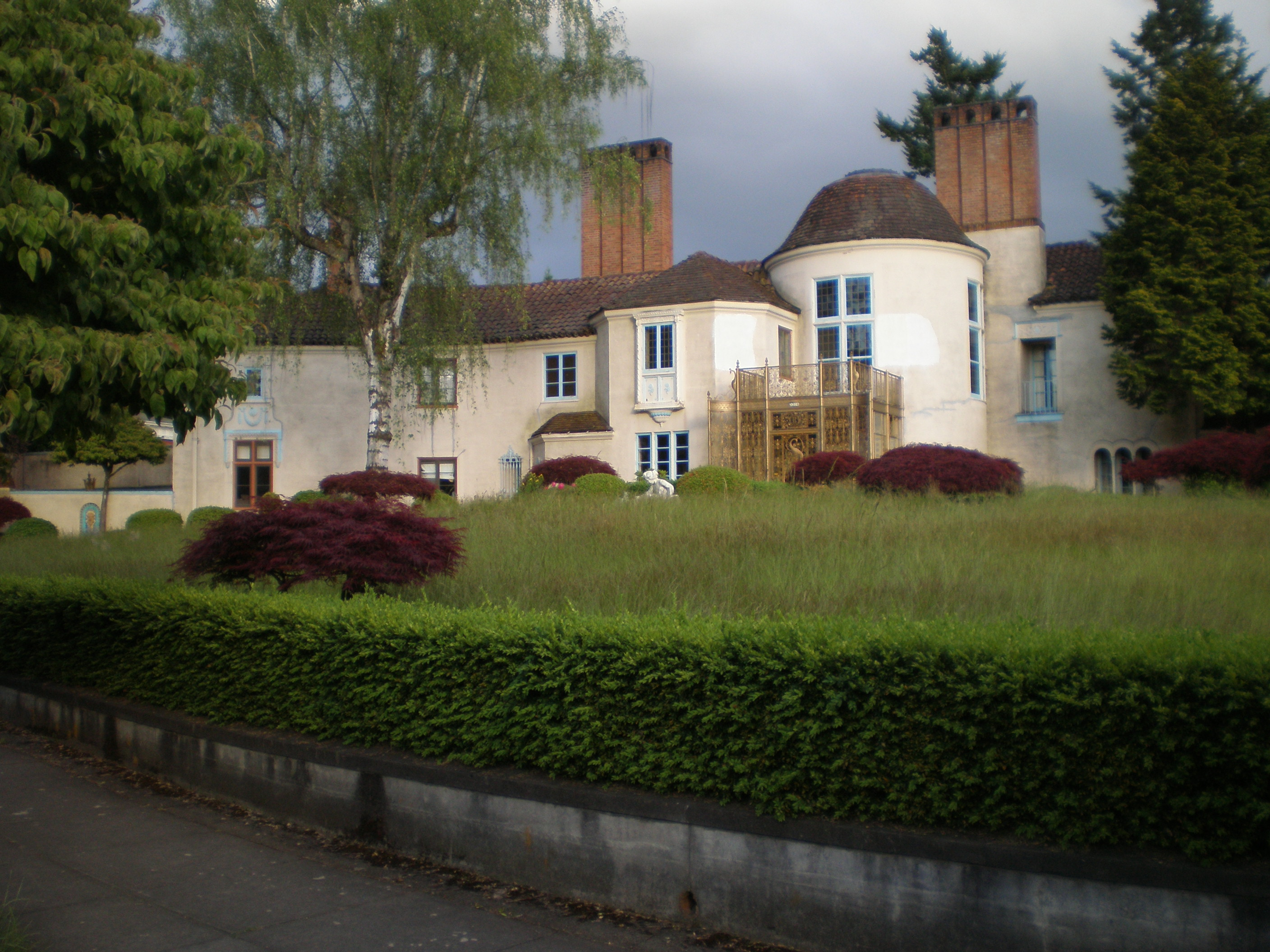
The Bitar Mansion, adjacent to Laurelhurst Park

Herman S. Brookman (July 2, 1891 – November 6, 1973) was an American architect in Portland, Oregon.

Born in New York, Brookman received early training in the office of society architect Harrie T. Lindeberg and worked there until 1923. He was influenced by Edwin Lutyens and was a noted perfectionist. Brookman came to Oregon in 1923 at the request of client Lloyd Frank, and spent the rest of his career there before retiring to California. Noted Portland architect John Yeon trained in his office. The 1926 Bitar Mansion designed by Brookman was put up for sale in 2006.

== Work ==
Brookman's work (in Portland, unless otherwise noted) includes:

- Commodore Hotel (1925)
- M. Lloyd Frank Estate (1926; now the site of Lewis & Clark College)
- Bitar Mansion (1926)
- Menucha, the Julius Meier estate in Corbett, Oregon (c. 1926)
- Temple Beth Israel (1926-1928; with Morris H. Whitehouse and Harry A. Herzog)
- Victor H. and Marta Jorgensen House (1929)
- Baruh–Zell House (1937)
- Grace Kern House (1955)
- Alan and Barbara Goldsmith House (1959)
