= Commodore Hotel (Portland, Oregon) =

Historic building in Portland, Oregon, U.S.

- U.S. National Register of Historic Places
- Portland Historic Landmark
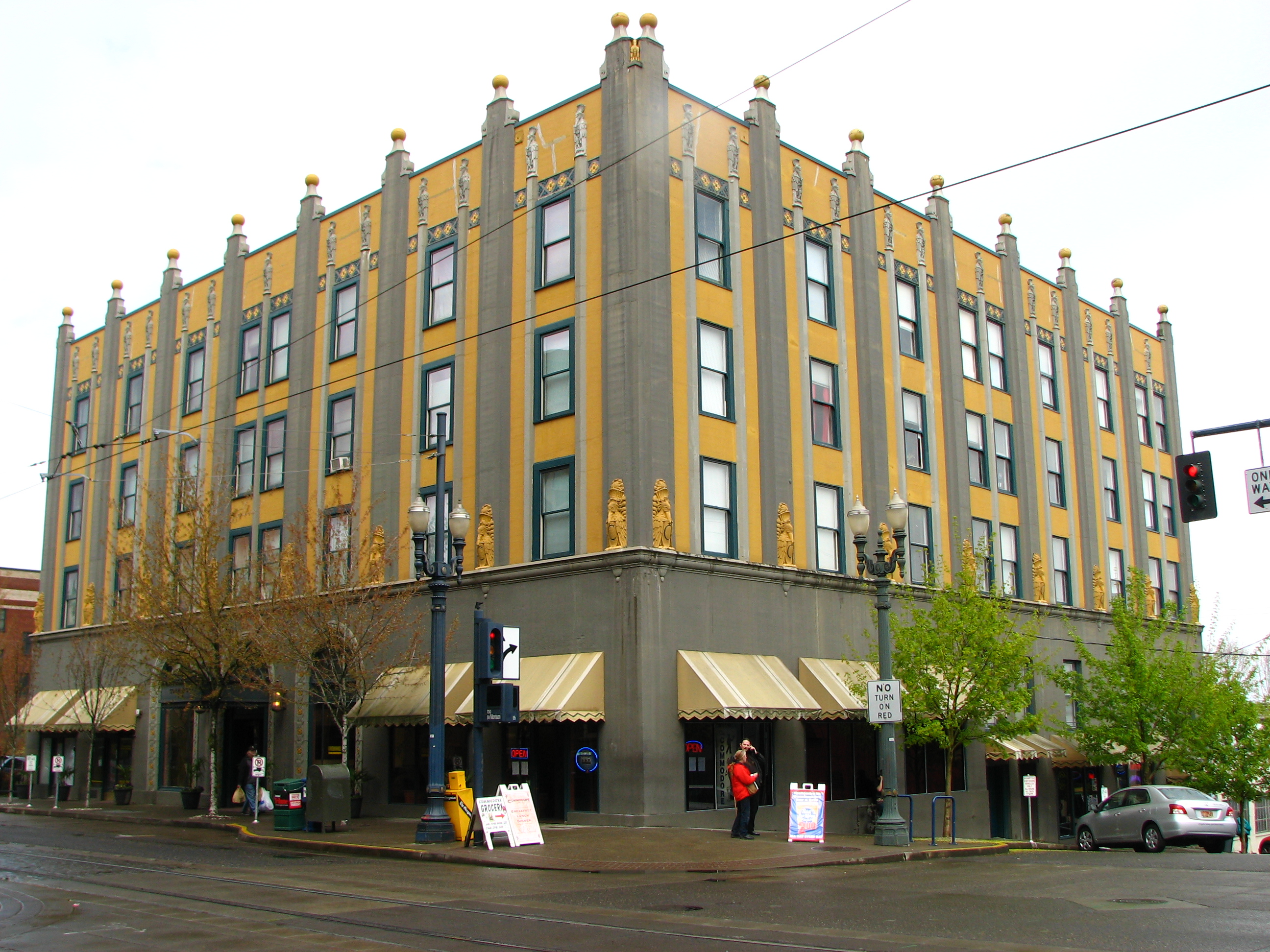
- The building's exterior in 2010

- Location within Portland, Oregon
- Location: 1609 SW Morrison Street; Portland, Oregon
- Coordinates: 45°31′19″N 122°41′18″W
- Area: less than one acre
- Built: 1925
- Architect: Herman Brookman
- Architectural style: Art Deco
- NRHP reference No.: 84003076
- Added to NRHP: June 27, 1984

The Commodore Hotel is an Art Deco-style former hotel building in Portland, Oregon, United States. It was built in 1925 and designed by Herman Brookman. It was listed on the National Register of Historic Places in 1984.

When the building was added to the National Register, it had already ceased to be used as a hotel and was vacant. Plans to renovate the building and convert it into apartments were approved by the Portland Development Commission that year.

Gilda's Italian Restaurant opened in the building's ground floor in 2010.
