= Victor H. and Marta Jorgensen House =

Historic building in Portland, Oregon, U.S.

- U.S. National Register of Historic Places
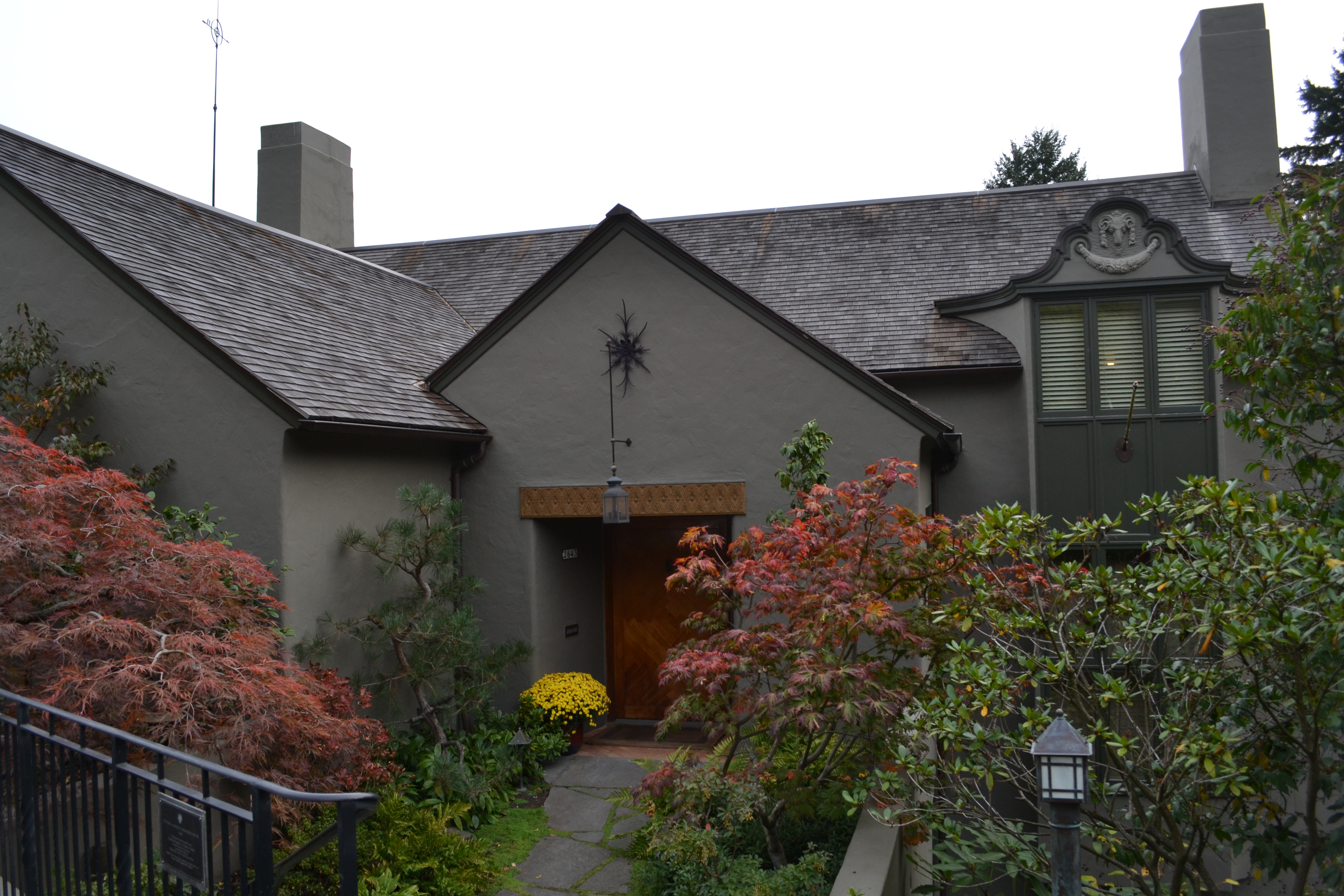
- The Jorgensen House in 2011.

- Location within Portland, Oregon
- Location: 2643 SW Buena Vista Drive; Portland, Oregon
- Coordinates: 45°30′32″N 122°42′15″W
- Area: less than one acre
- Built: 1929
- Architect: Brookman, Herman
- Architectural style: Modern Movement
- NRHP reference No.: 08000405
- Added to NRHP: May 15, 2008

The Victor H. and Marta Jorgensen House is a house located in southwest Portland, Oregon, listed on the National Register of Historic Places.

== See also ==
- National Register of Historic Places listings in Southwest Portland, Oregon
