= Baruh–Zell House =

Historic building in Portland, Oregon, U.S.

- U.S. National Register of Historic Places
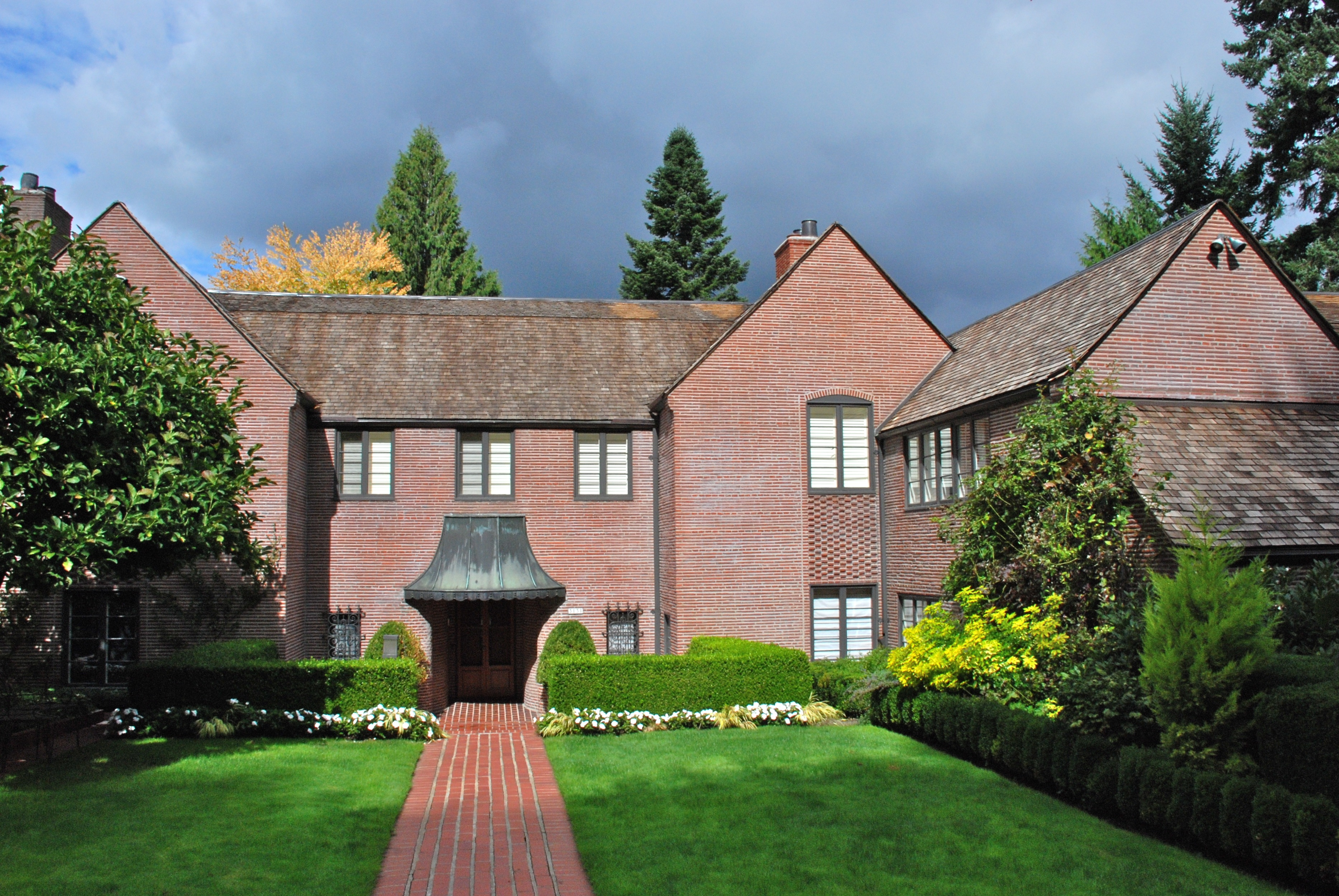
- The Baruh–Zell House in 2013

- Location within Portland, Oregon
- Location: 3131 SW Talbot Road; Portland, Oregon
- Coordinates: 45°30′05″N 122°42′33″W
- Area: 0.37 acres (0.15 ha)
- Built: 1937
- Architect: Herman Brookman
- Architectural style: Tudor Revival
- NRHP reference No.: 07000256
- Added to NRHP: April 5, 2007

The Baruh–Zell House, also referred to as the Leo and Olga Baruh House, is a historic house located in Portland, Oregon, United States. Leading Portland residential architect Herman Brookman's design for this 1937 Tudor Revival house was one of his finest achievements. In many of its features, such as curved walls, stripped-down ornamentation, recessed entry, and functionally-oriented rear elevation, it heralds the transition from highly traditional European styles executed on a grand scale to a modernized and simplified reinterpretation of those styles responsive to contemporary technology and preferences. The house was added to the National Register of Historic Places in 2007.

== See also ==
- National Register of Historic Places listings in Southwest Portland, Oregon
