= Grace Kern House =

Historic building in Portland, Oregon, U.S.

- U.S. National Register of Historic Places
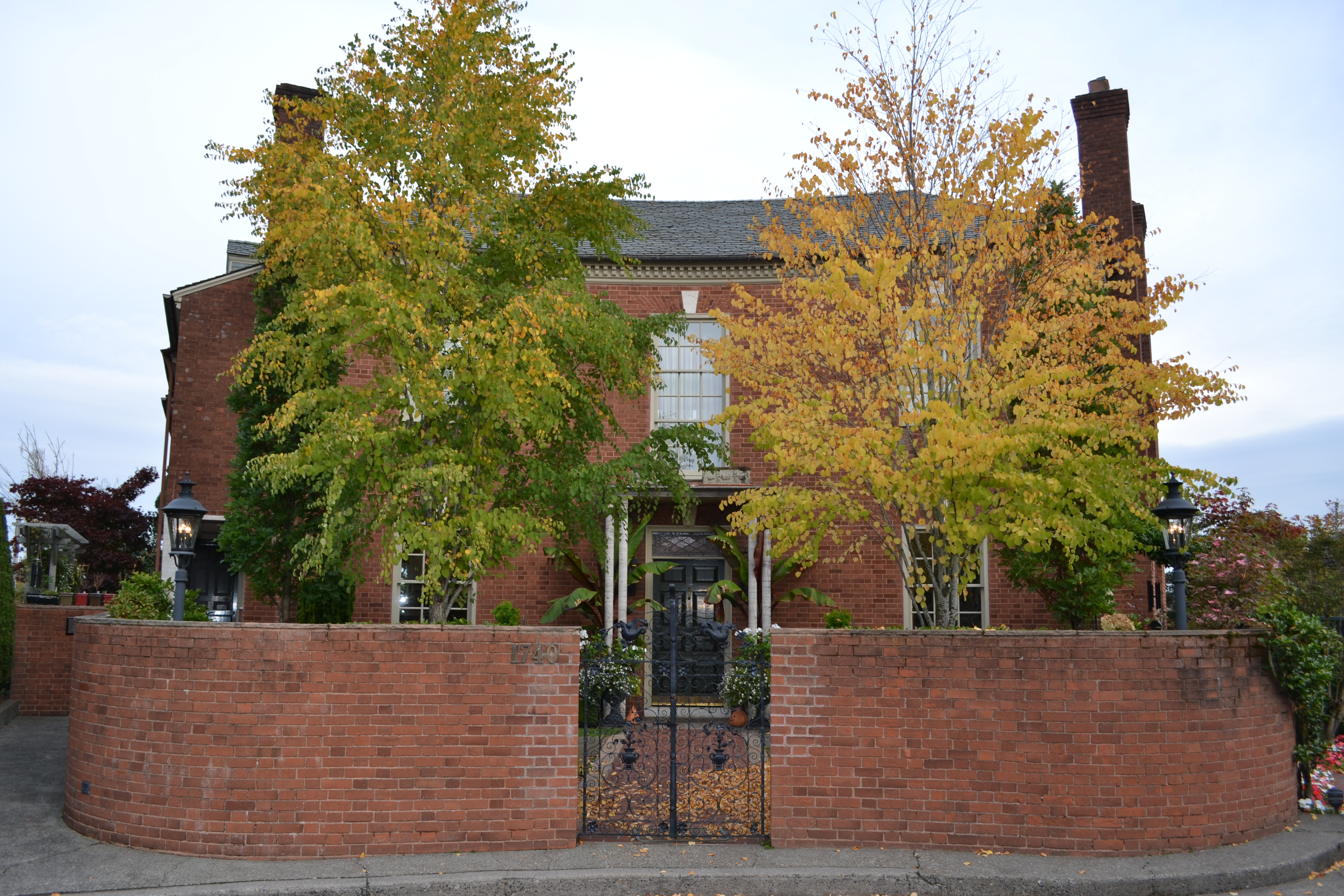
- The house's exterior in 2011

- Location within Portland, Oregon
- Location: 1740 SW West Point Court; Portland, Oregon
- Coordinates: 45°30′59″N 122°41′49″W
- Area: less than one acre
- Built: 1955
- Architect: Herman Brookman
- Architectural style: Classical Revival
- NRHP reference No.: 07001378
- Added to NRHP: January 9, 2008

The Grace Kern House is a house located in southwest Portland, Oregon, listed on the National Register of Historic Places.

== See also ==
- National Register of Historic Places listings in Southwest Portland, Oregon
