= Havurah Shalom =

Reconstructionist synagogue in Portland, Oregon, United States

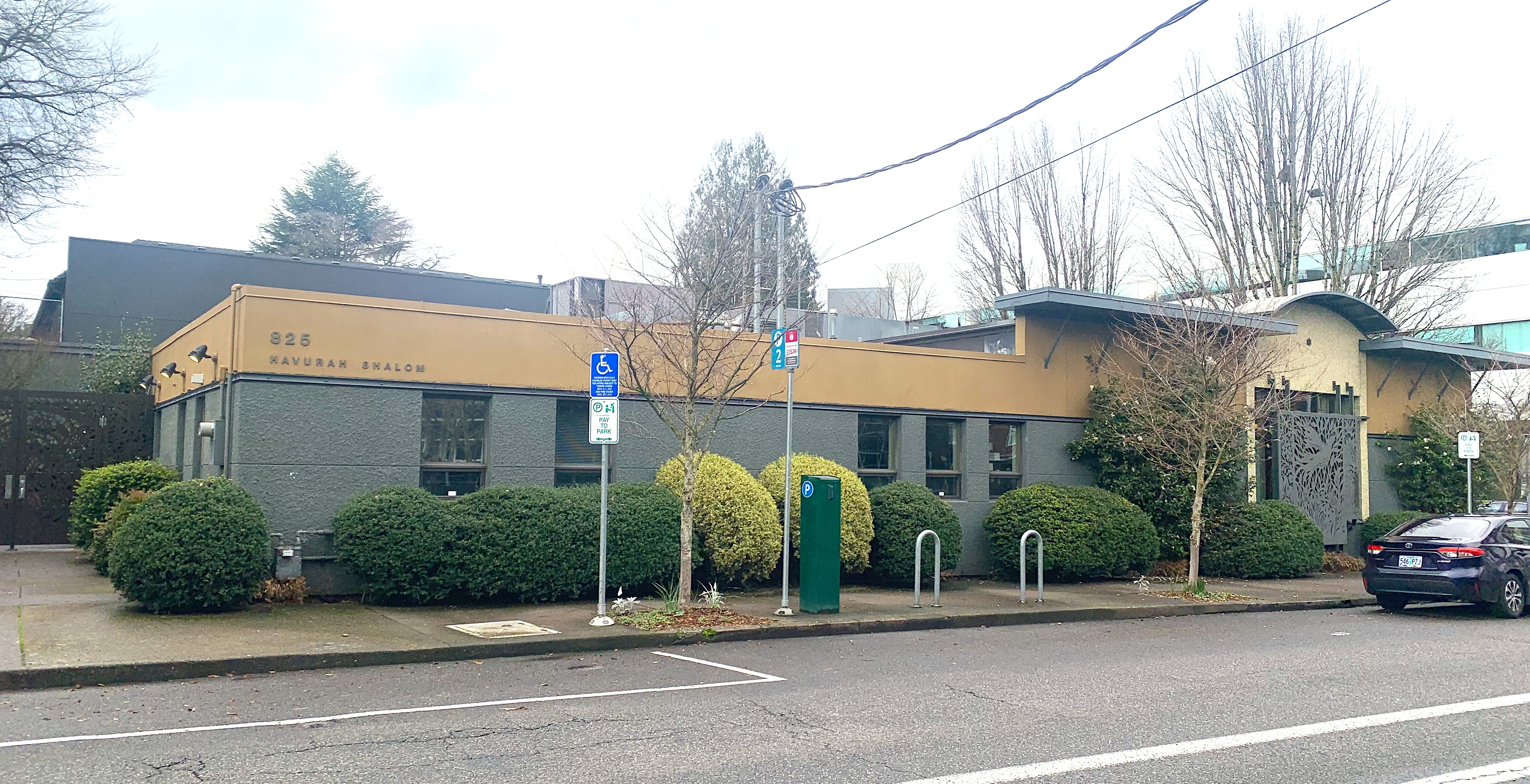
- Havurah Shalom (December 2025)
- Formation: 1978
- Coordinates: 45.52904035854428°N 122.68960874040953°W
- Members: 400 families
- Rabbi: Benjamin Barnett
- Rabbinic Intern: Noah Lind
- Rabbi Emeritus: Joey Wolf
- Affiliations: Reconstructionist Judaism
- Website: havurahshalom.org

Havurah Shalom is a Reconstructionist synagogue located in Portland, Oregon, United States. Havurah Shalom was founded in 1978 and has been located in Northwest Portland since 1998. Today it is an active synagogue offering religious services, Hebrew school, adult education, and community engagement.

== History ==
Havurah Shalon was founded in 1978 as the city's first Reconstructionist synagogue by former members of Congregation Beth Israel, Portland's oldest synagogue founded in 1858. The congregation met at different community spaces in its first few years. In 1986, Havurah Shalom was holding Friday night services at the Mittleman Jewish Community Center and Saturday morning services at the West Hills Unitarian Fellowship. Havurah Shalom's Shabbat School began at the Unitarian Fellowship and moved to the Jewish Community Center in 1982 where it met until the congregation would have its own building.

The nascent congregation recruited and hired Rabbi Joey Wolf who had served as a rabbi in Austin, Texas for the previous six years. During his tenure, Rabbi Wolf built connections between the synagogue and LGBT, Black, Muslim, Arab, and other communities, and under his stewardship, established an endowment. He joined the coalition of rabbis from across the Jewish community to support the building of Portland's eruv in 2009. Rabbi Wolf retired in 2017 and was succeeded by Rabbi Benjamin Barnett.

In the late 1990s, the congregation sought its own permanent location. Havurah Shalom purchased two small concrete warehouses in Northwest Portland originally built to store and protect flammable celluloid film canisters from fire and environmental damage. The congregation engaged architect Richard Brown to transform the buildings into its multipurpose sanctuary with office, kitchen, and classroom spaces. Havurah Shalom moved into the building in 1998.

Rabbi Barnett continues to serve as rabbi at Havurah Shalom.
