= M. Lloyd Frank Estate =

Historic building in Portland, Oregon, U.S.

- U.S. National Register of Historic Places
- Portland Historic Landmark
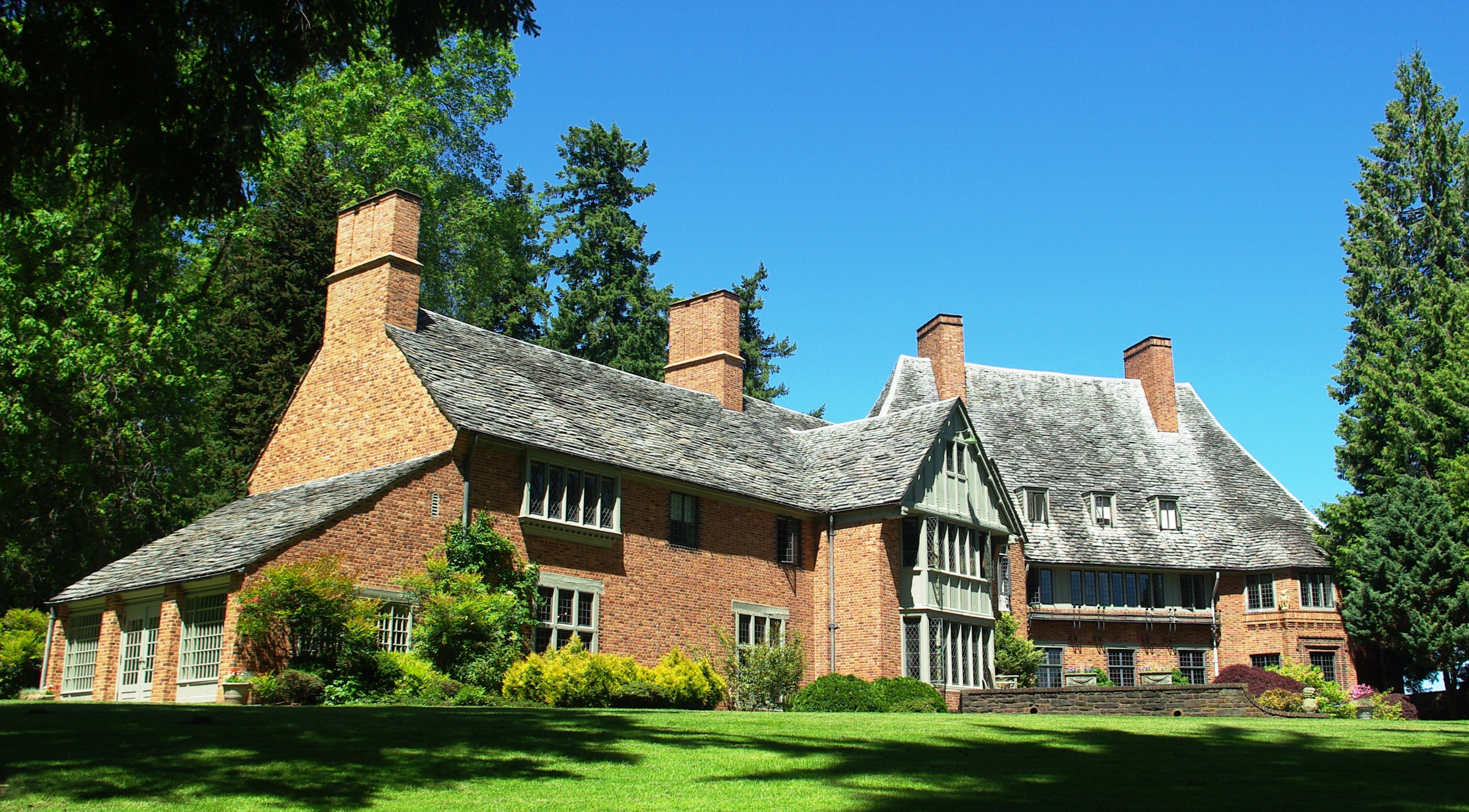
- Manor House at the estate

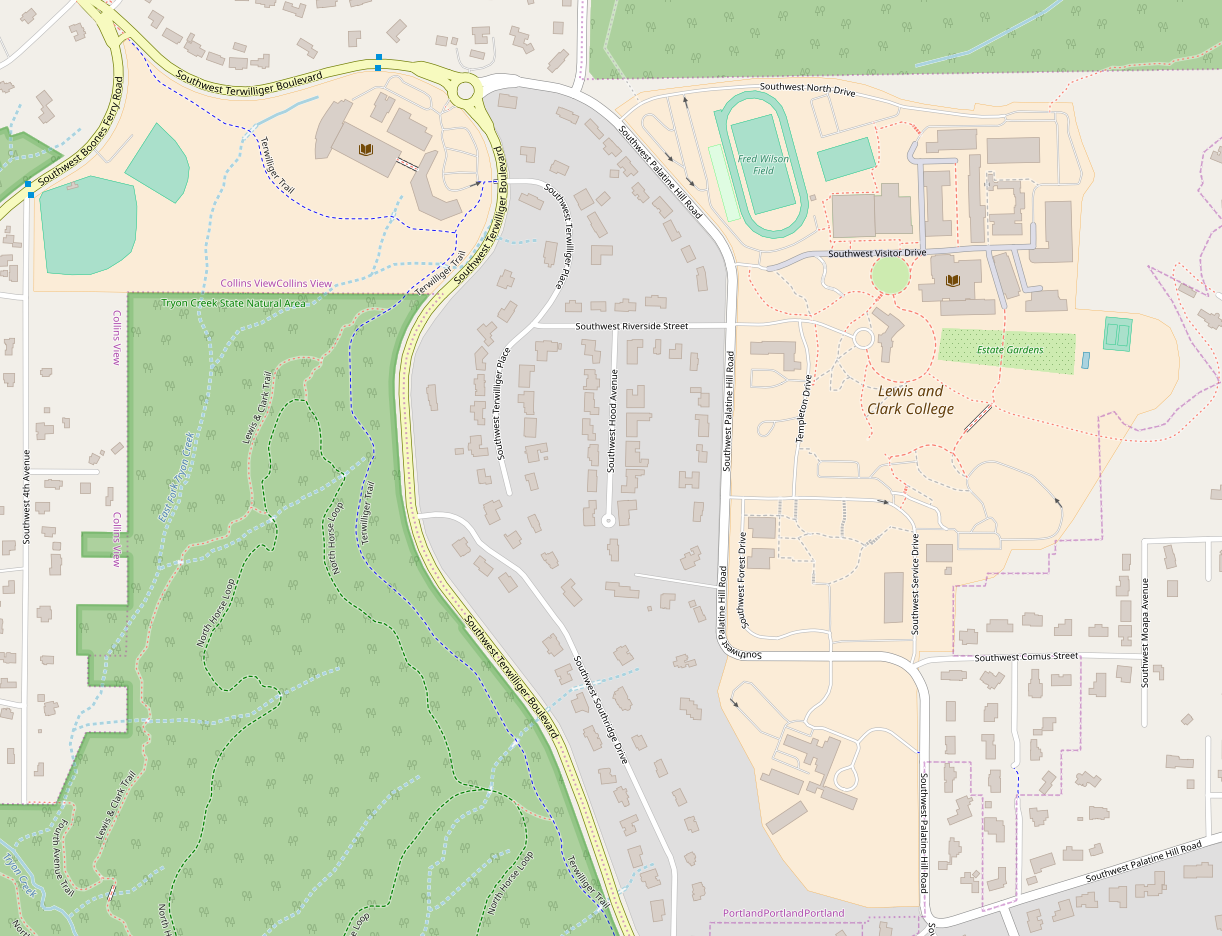
- Location within Lewis & Clark College campus
- Location: 0615 SW Palatine Hill Road; Portland, Oregon
- Coordinates: 45°27′01″N 122°40′12″W
- Area: 8.5 acres (3.4 ha)
- Built: 1924
- Architect: Herman Brookman
- Architectural style: English Modern
- NRHP reference No.: 79002133
- Added to NRHP: April 18, 1979

The M. Lloyd Frank Estate, also known as the Frank Manor House, is a historic building on the campus of Lewis & Clark College, in Portland, Oregon, United States. It is listed on the National Register of Historic Places. The Manor House is currently used as the administrative center for Lewis & Clark College.

It was the first architectural commission that Herman Brookman received, having just moved to Portland in 1923 or 1924. The house was completed in the Tudor style in 1926 by the McHolland Brothers construction company. The roof is composed of Pennsylvania slate.

On the property, which was 63 acres (25 ha), near the conservatory (that was severely damaged in the Columbus Day Storm of 1962), is a metal gate designed by Oscar Bach. Bach designed other metalwork as well. Brookman designed the majority of the estate.

== See also ==
- National Register of Historic Places listings in Southwest Portland, Oregon
