= Gilda's Italian Restaurant =

Italian restaurant in Portland, Oregon, U.S.

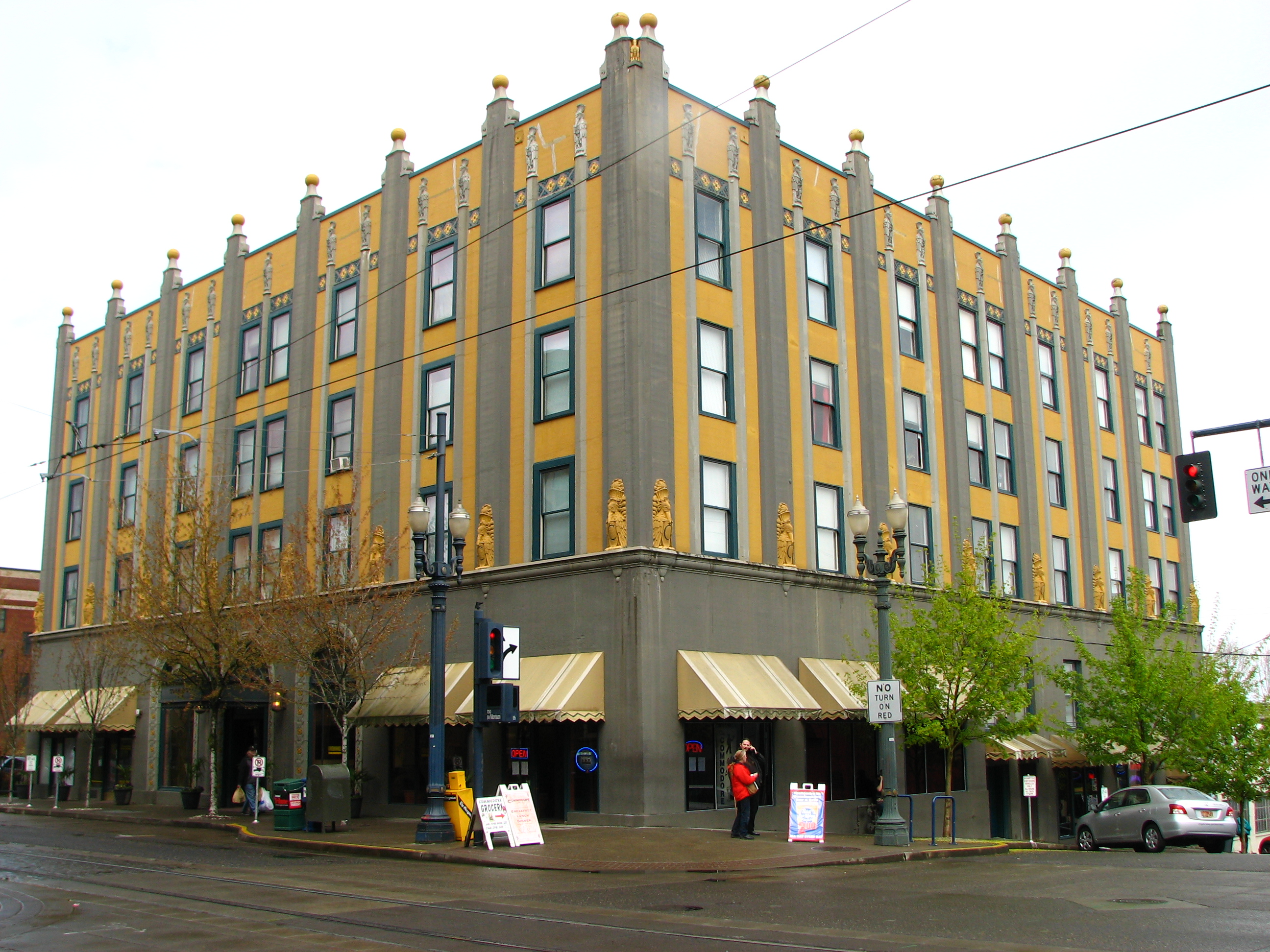
- The restaurant is housed on the ground floor of the Commodore Hotel (pictured in 2010)
- Interactive map of Gilda's Italian Restaurant

Restaurant information
- Established: 2010
- Owner: Marco Roberti
- Food type: Italian
- Location: 1601 Southwest Morrison Street, Portland, Multnomah, Oregon, 97205, United States
- Coordinates: 45.5218°N 122.6883°W
- Website: gildasitalianrestaurant.com

Gilda's Italian Restaurant is a family-owned Italian restaurant in Portland, Oregon. Marco Roberti is an owner.

== Description ==
Gilda's is housed on the ground floor of the Commodore Hotel in southwest Portland's Goose Hollow neighborhood. The menu includes arancini, linguine, pappardelle, and rigatoni.

== History ==
The restaurant opened in 2010. In 2012, Gilda's announced plans to expand into the space previously occupied by Commodore Lounge.

== Reception ==
In her 2016 overview of Portland's romantic restaurants, Julie Lee of 1859 wrote, "Gilda's is one of those 'old school' restaurants that is steeped in nostalgia and charm. Chef Marco lovingly whips up recipes from his grandma Gilda, who took as much pleasure in feeding family, friends and neighbors as Marco does. Everything on the menu is authentic and delicious, and we highly recommend pairing the Le Gilda, house limoncello and St. Germaine topped with prosecco, with a Caesar salad and the tagliatelle with lobster for this special night." In 2017, readers of The Oregonian voted Gilda's their favorite Italian restaurant in Portland.

== See also ==
- List of Italian restaurants
