= History of the Jews in Oregon =

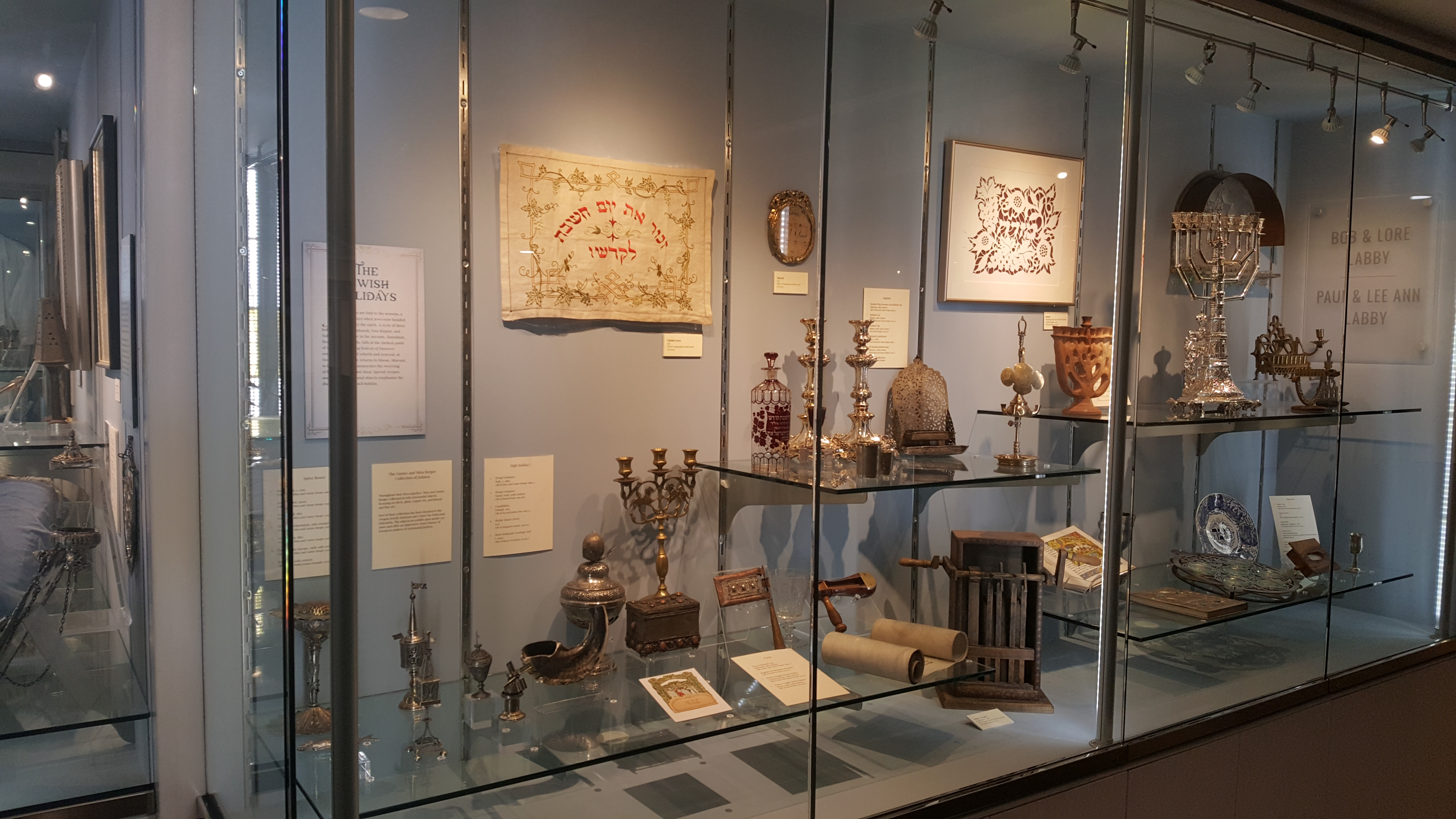
An exhibit in the Oregon Jewish Museum

Jewish immigrants arrived in the Oregon Territory as early as 1849, before Oregon was granted its statehood in 1859. The first Jews who settled there were mainly of German origin, and largely practiced Reform Judaism. By the mid-1850s, Oregon had a number of Jewish communities in small towns, including Jacksonville in southern Oregon, and later Burns, Heppner, and Baker in eastern Oregon. Portland, the state's largest city, served as a hub for Jews due to its larger Jewish community. The Reform Congregation Beth Israel, which founded the state's first synagogue in Portland in 1861, is one of the oldest Jewish congregations in the western United States, and its cemetery has the distinction of being the oldest continually running Jewish cemetery in the country.

Early European Jewish immigrants rarely faced antisemitism in the Oregon American frontier, as other settlers tended to consider them as fellow white pioneers. The Jewish populations' engagement in town building, involvement in pack train operations, and battling in Oregon's American Indian Wars further ingratiated them into their respective communities.

Beginning in the 1880s, an influx of Eastern European Jews from Russia, Ukraine, Poland entered Oregon, many of whom were conservative ideological socialists who practiced Orthodox Judaism. This led to some friction between the established American Jews in the state, who founded programs promoting Americanization to the communities of Eastern European newcomers, as they felt their Old World customs could potentially stoke antisemitism. In the early 20th-century, the expansion of Portland as a major city resulted in many Jewish Oregonians relocating there and establishing new communities. From the midcentury onward, the Jewish population in Oregon steadily increased, with new congregations being founded in numerous cities throughout the state. The Orthodox Jewish population in Portland in particular has increased since 2005.

== History ==
=== Early immigration and frontier presence ===
Jewish immigrants from Europe began settling in the Oregon Territory as early as 1849, primarily single men of German origin, many of whom were not strong adherents to the Jewish religion, which delayed the establishment of religious communities in the state. According to the Oregon Historical Society, "the requisites for strict practice, such as the quorum of ten men needed for a service and the availability of kosher meat, were lacking on the frontier." Many Jewish men established businesses and trade operations via San Francisco, which led them north into the then-Oregon Territory. Historian William Toll described the Jewish immigrants who traveled to the west coast:

They tended to be a different kind of person—independent-minded, ready to leave the community they knew, more connected to natural beauty than, say, the Jews who declined to leave urban centers of Philadelphia and New York for an unknown life among the evergreens and people who at the time were called Indians.

By the early 1850s, approximately one-third of storekeepers and merchants in the southern Oregon mining boomtown of Jacksonville were Jewish. The first documented Jewish religious service in Oregon took place in Jacksonville in 1856 in celebration of the High Holidays. After an influx of Jewish women in Oregon beginning in the late 1850s, family formations began. Caroline Weinshank, described as the "first Jewish woman in Oregon," arrived in Portland in 1853, and opened a boarding house there for Jewish bachelors. In 1858, Weinshank married Elias Stille in Independence, marking one of the state's earliest Jewish wedding ceremonies.

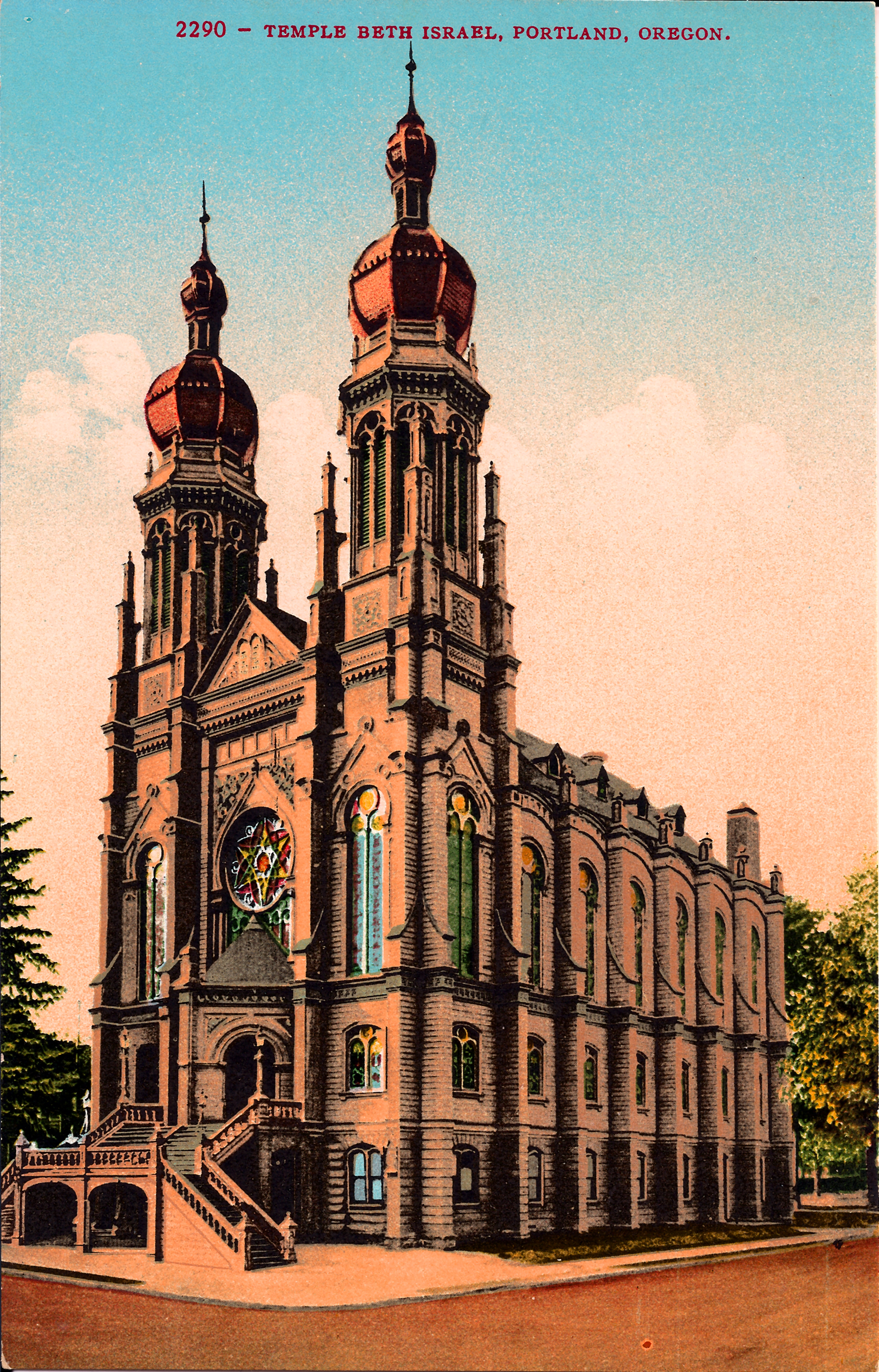
Original Temple Beth Israel building; it was destroyed in 1923 and rebuilt in 1928

The growing Jewish population in Oregon led to the establishment of Congregation Beth Israel in Portland, founded in 1858. Beth Israel was the first Jewish congregation in the western United States north of California and west of the Continental Divide. By 1861, Beth Israel had established the first synagogue in the state of Oregon. The growing Jewish community in Portland also necessitated the founding of the city's first Jewish cemetery, Mount Sinai Cemetery, which was established in 1856 near the west end of the present-day Ross Island Bridge. In 1862, Congregation Beth Israel acquired the cemetery, after which it became Beth Israel Cemetery before being relocated in 1871. It has the distinction of being the oldest continually running Jewish cemetery in the United States.

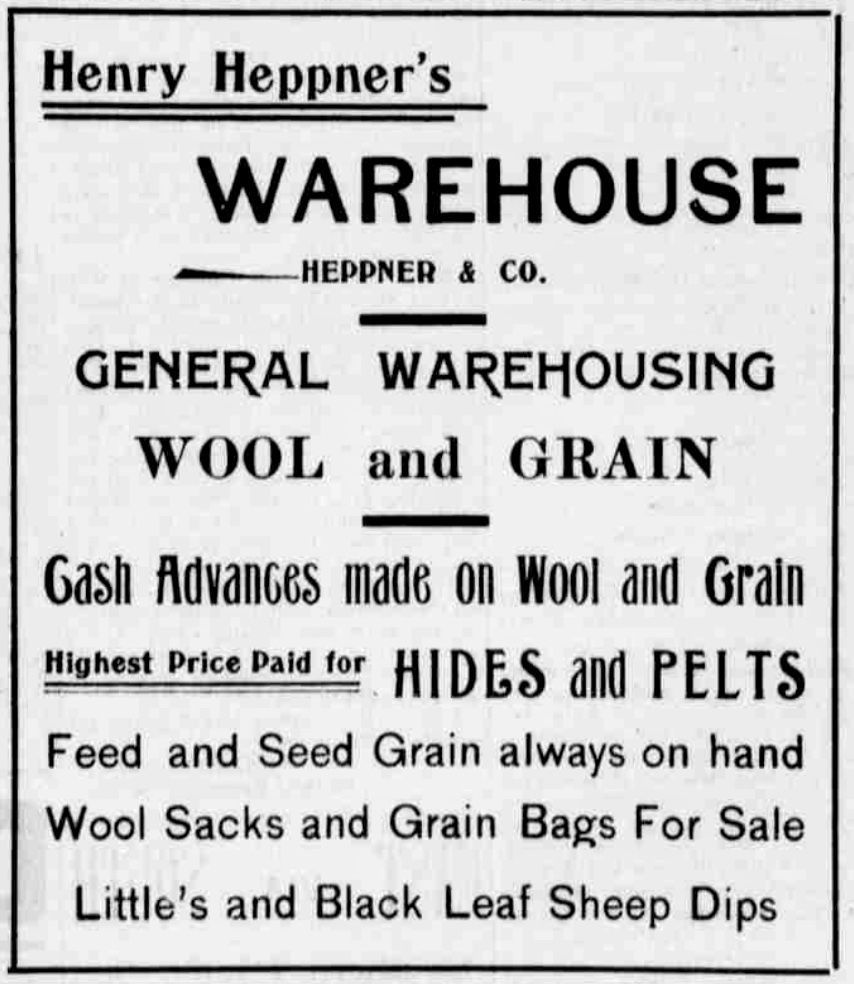
Newspaper advertisement for Henry Heppner's wool and grain warehouse, 1900

Incidents of antisemitism in the Oregon frontier were rare, as English-speaking European Jews were generally viewed by other settlers as fellow white pioneers. Furthermore, the Jewish population's engagement in town building, pack train operations, and fighting in Oregon's Indian Wars helped foster inclusion of Jews in organizations such as the Native Sons of Oregon, which celebrated American pioneer history in the state. Prussian-born pack train operator Henry Heppner established mercantiles in the cities of Arlington, La Grande, and Umatilla in the 1860s; the city of Heppner, which he founded, takes its name from him.

While smaller communities in eastern and southern Oregon—particularly Burns and Baker—maintained Jewish populations through the 1860s, the Jewish communities there began to wane by the 1870s, with many relocating to the burgeoning Portland due to its larger Jewish population as well as for career and business opportunities. A lack of congregations and synagogues also served as an impetus for many Jews to move to Portland, as they often had to travel there for holidays and life-cycle rituals. In 1869, a splinter group of Prussian immigrant Jews established the more conservative congregation Avahai Shalom in Portland, contrasting with the established Beth Israel, which developed into a reform congregation.

=== Second wave; civic engagement ===
Jewish civic leadership in Oregon in the following several decades was bolstered by the community's early ingratiation with other pioneers. Bernard Goldsmith, a Bavarian Jewish immigrant to Oregon who fought as a cavalry lieutenant in the state's Indian Wars, was elected as the 19th mayor of Portland, serving from 1869 until 1871. Prior to his political involvement, Goldsmith had operated a dry good store with his brothers, and became one of Portland's financial elite; he was involved in local wheat shipping business, railroads, and the construction of the locks at Willamette Falls in Oregon City.

Beginning in the 1880s, the United States saw an influx of Eastern European Jews, largely aspiring farmers and laborers from Russia, Ukraine, Latvia, and Poland. The Eastern European Jewish community that arrived in Oregon was considerably more conservative and religious than the already-established American Jews (largely of German origin); They were also more receptive to socialist and Zionist ideologies. Such ideological differences created a fraught relationship between the two groups, with many American Jews regarding the newcomers as "backward and insular", and fearing their presence may fuel antisemitism. In response, the established Jewish communities began creating aid programs preaching Americanization to incoming Eastern European Jewish immigrants.

New Odessa colony members, Roseburg, Oregon, 1882

Among the Eastern European Jewish movements was Am Olam, a Russian-Jewish socialist agricultural colony that originated in Odessa and established satellite colonies in New Jersey, Louisiana, and North Dakota in 1881. In 1882, Am Olam founded the New Odessa Colony on 900 acres (360 hectares) in Roseburg, Oregon. The group lived communally at New Odessa for approximately five years until its dissolution in 1887.

The 1890s saw many Eastern European Jewish immigrants in Oregon working as traders or aspiring merchants in Portland, which by that time was a major economic and cultural hub in the Pacific Northwest. In 1902, Portland's first Orthodox congregation, Shaarie Torah, was established by Russian Jewish immigrants. This was followed by Linath Hazedek in 1914; Kesser Israel in 1916; and Ahavath Achim (also 1916). The latter congregation, Ahavath Achim, was established by Sephardic Jews who began to immigrate to Portland from the Mediterranean. By the 1920s, Portland's Sephardic Jewish community was the second-largest in the country after Seattle's.

In 1930, Julius Meier, the Jewish founder of the Portland-based Meier & Frank department store chain, was elected as the president of the Oregon Senate, despite an increase in antisemitism on both a national and local level.

=== South Portland community; mid-century ===
In the early 20th century, Eastern European and Sephardic Jewish immigrants made up a significant population in South Portland, a neighborhood immediately south of downtown Portland. With the support of Rabbi Stephen Wise, the Portland Section of the National Council of Jewish Women Neighborhood House was established in South Portland in 1905. Ida Loewenberg, a social worker, oversaw the Neighborhood House's operations for over three decades, starting in 1912. The South Portland neighborhood remained a Jewish cultural hub through the 1920s and 1930s, and was home to the Portland Hebrew School, the Jewish Home for the Aged, the B’nai B’rith Building, and a number of congregations.

In 1959, the bi-monthly publication the Jewish Review was established in Portland by the Jewish Federation of Greater Portland.

In the 1950s and 1960s, some Jewish Oregonians faced antisemitism through exclusion from country clubs, professional firms, and educational institutions such as high schools and college fraternities and sororities.

=== Late 20th-century–present ===
In the late 1970s, Oregon's Jewish population expanded to over 10,000, and was approximately 25,000 by 1999. Due to the growing population, congregations in Eugene and Salem hired full-time rabbis to meet demand. Congregations were also established in Eugene, Bend, Ashland, and Corvallis. In 1989, the Oregon Jewish Museum and Center for Holocaust Education was founded in Portland.

The increase in Jewish residents of Oregon is attributed to a migration of young Jews from other parts of the United States. In Portland, Jewish philanthropic figures such as Arlene Schnitzer and her husband, Harold, helped establish an arts and education community, funding Jewish studies programs at Portland State University and the University of Oregon, as well as funding the revitalization of the Portland Publix Theater, a former movie house-turned-performing arts center which took its namesake from Arlene. The Schnitzers also funded the foundation of medical programs at Oregon Health & Science University, such as the OHSU Center for Women’s Health and the OHSU Harold Schnitzer Diabetes Health Center.

In 2004, the Oregon Holocaust Memorial was dedicated in Portland's Washington Park. Beginning in 2005, Portland has seen a growing population of Orthodox Jews. As of 2021, approximately 2% of Portland's population identified as Jewish.

== Synagogues ==
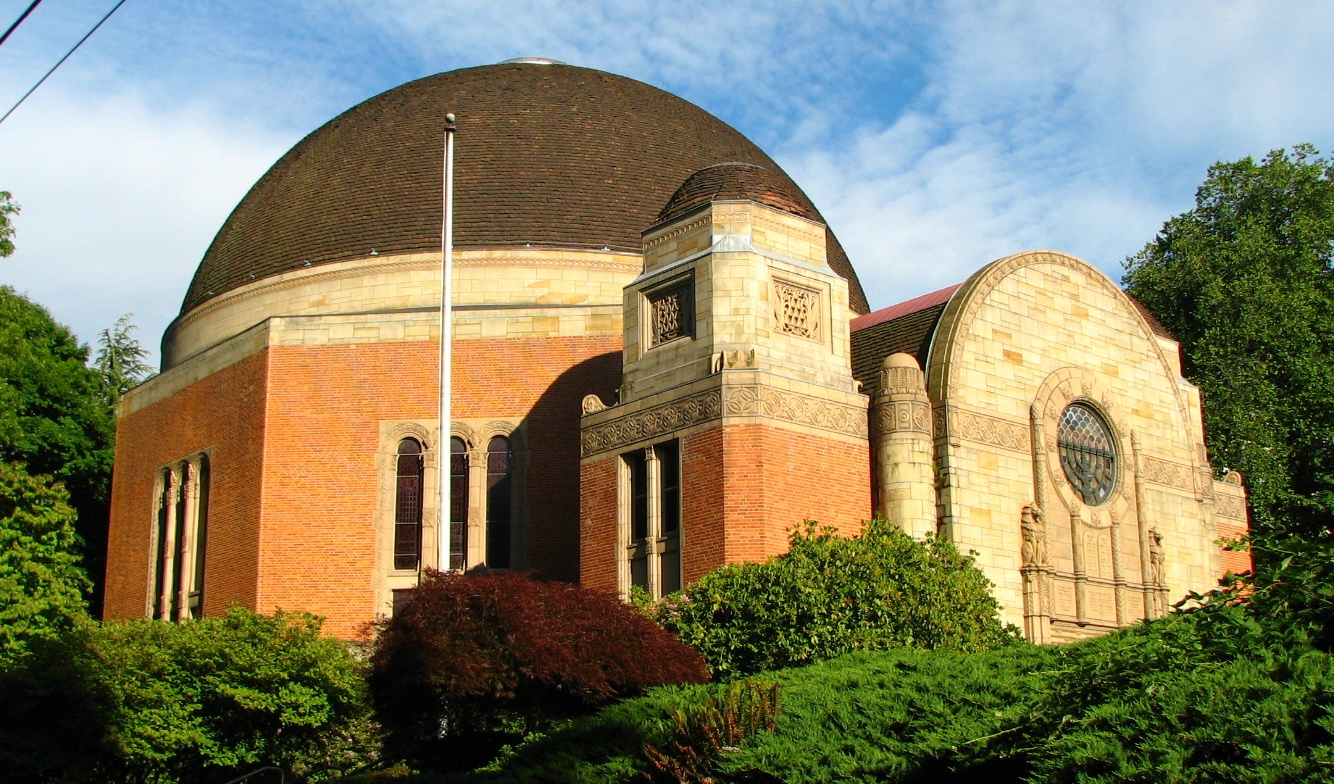
Congregation Beth Israel, Portland

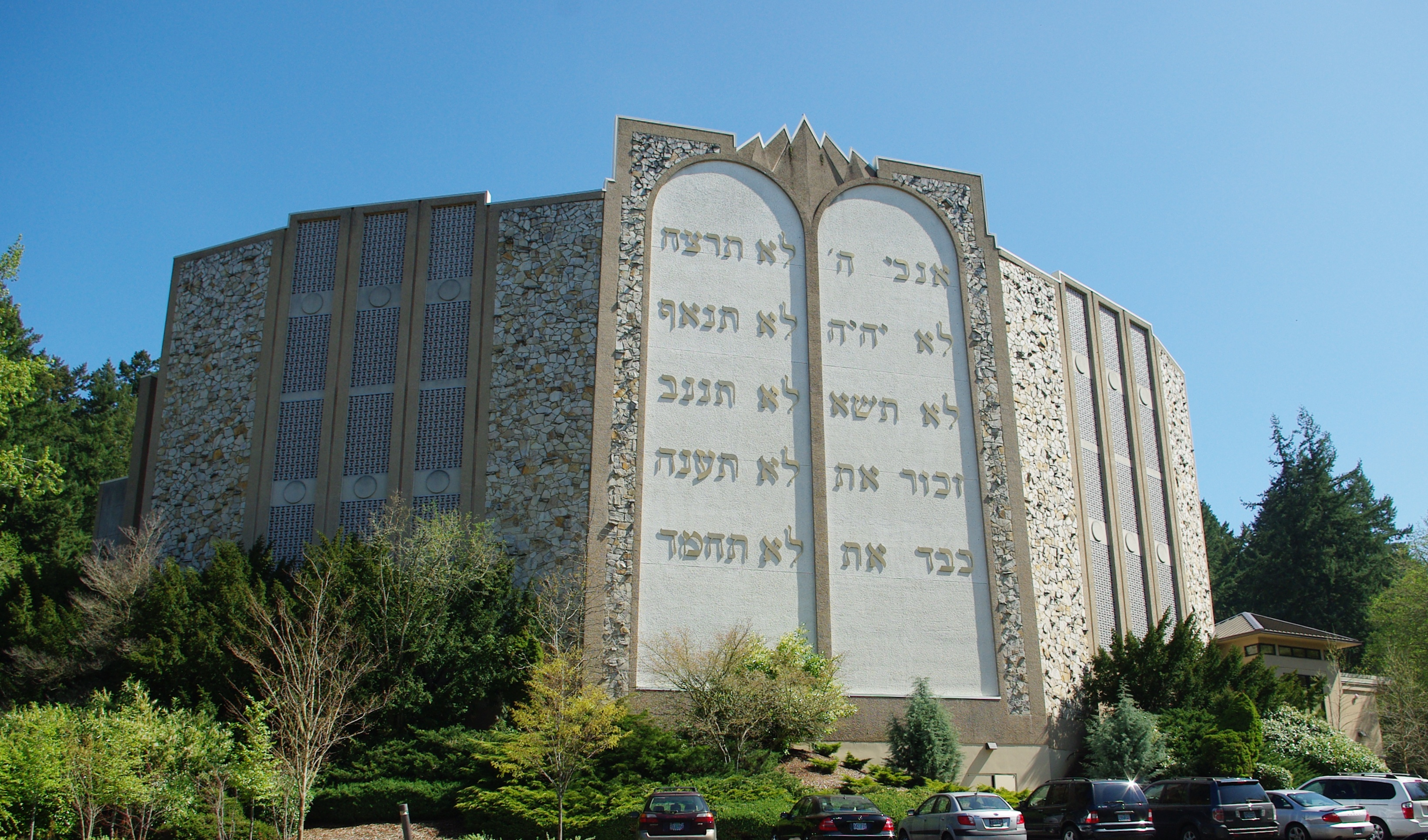
Neveh Shalom Synagogue, Portland

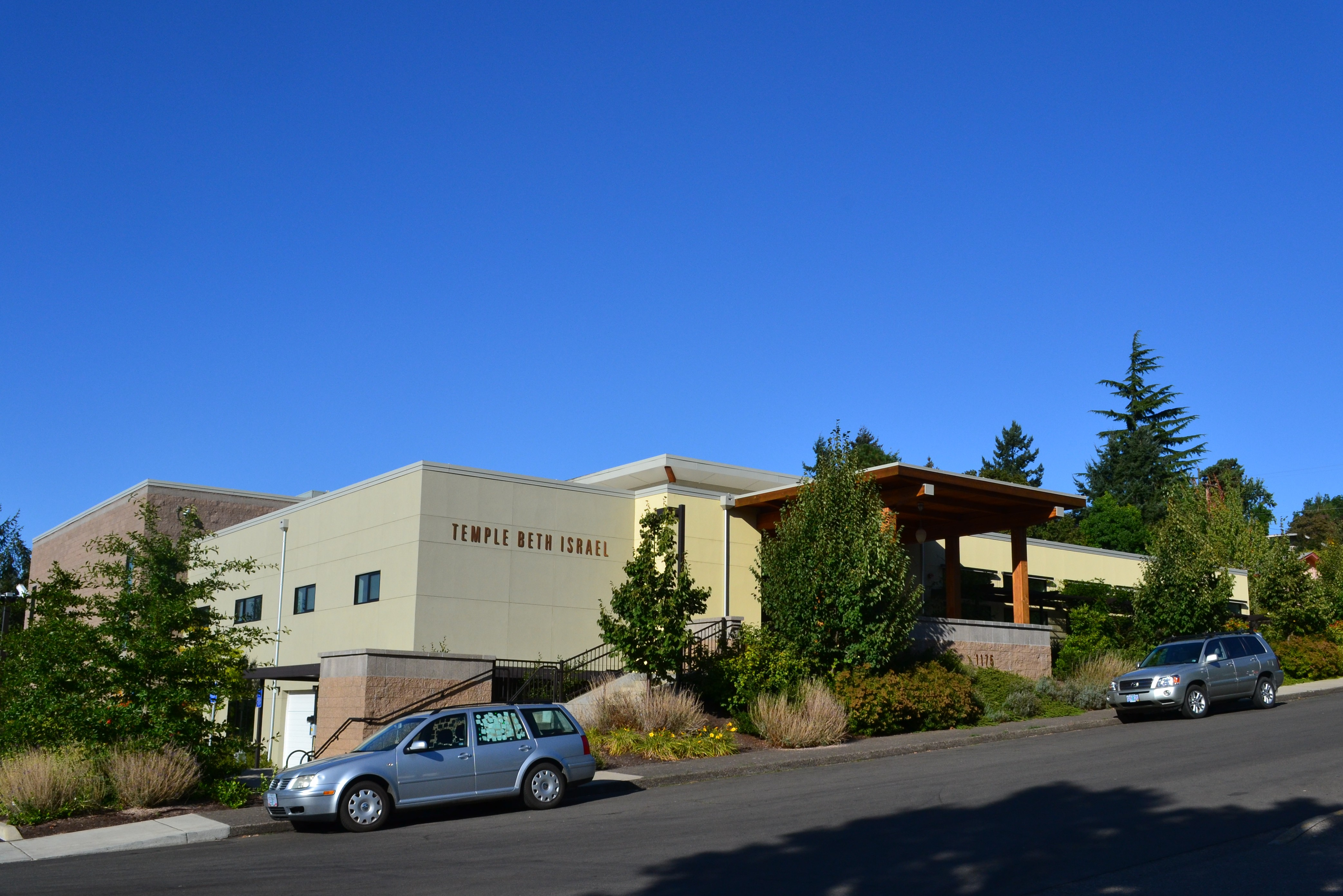
Temple Beth Israel, Eugene

Synagogue	Founded	City	Denomination	Ref.
Congregation Ahavas Torah		Eugene	Orthodox	
Congregation Ahavath Achim	1916	Portland	Orthodox	
Congregation Bais Menachem	1961	Portland	Chabad Orthodox	
Congregation Beit Yosef		Portland	Orthodox	
Congregation Beth Israel	1859	Portland	Reform	
Congregation Kesser Israel		Portland	Orthodox	
Congregation Mayim Shalom		Coos Bay		
Congregation Neveh Shalom	1961	Portland	Conservative	
Congregation Shaarie Torah	1905	Portland	Conservative	
Congregation Shalom Bayit	1993	Bend	Reconstructionist	
Congregation Shir Tikvah		Portland	Non-denominational	
Havurah Shalom	1978	Portland	Reconstructionist	
Temple Beth Israel	1961	Eugene	Reconstructionist	
Temple Beth Shalom		Salem	Reconstructionist	
Temple Beth Tikvah	2008	Bend	Reform	
Temple Emek Shalom		Ashland	Reconstructionist	

== Notable people ==
- Megan Amram (1987–), comedy writer
- Shoshana Bean (1977–), actress and singer
- Joe Benjamin (1898–1983), boxer
- Caroline Burke (1913–1964), actress and theater producer
- Ernest Bloch (1880–1959), composer
- Abe Cohn (1897–1970), football and basketball player
- Michael Dembrow (1951–), politician
- Neil Goldschmidt (1940–2024), politician
- Bernard Goldsmith (1832–1901), 19th mayor of Portland
- Henry Heppner (1831–1905), Prussian-born civic leader in eastern Oregon
- Solomon Hirsch (1839–1902), president of the Oregon State Senate
- Marshall Holman (1954–), sports broadcaster
- Ian Karmel (1984–), comedian
- Vera Katz (1933–2017), politician and 49th mayor of Portland
- Bernard Malamud (1914–1986), novelist and faculty of Oregon State University
- Julius Meier (1874–1937), governor; heir to Meier & Frank department store chain
- Harry Mittleman (1900–1985), real estate developer
- Rose Naftalin (1896–1998), chef and cookbook author
- Richard L. Neuberger (1912–1960), journalist
- Mark Rothko (1903–1970), abstract painter
- Monte Scheinblum (1967–), professional golfer
- Arlene Schnitzer (1929–2020), arts patron and philanthropist
- Harold Schnitzer (1923–2011), philanthropist
- Mildred Schwab (1917–1999), politician
- Rebecca Schaeffer (1967–1989), actress
- Ben Selling (c. 1852–1931), businessman and philanthropist
- Ari Shapiro (1978–), journalist
- Leonard Shapiro, computer scientist
- Joseph Simon (1851–1935), politician
- Michael H. Simon (1956–), U.S. district judge
- Norton Simon (1907–1993), industrialist and philanthropist
- Lori Singer (1957–), actress and musician
- Gus J. Solomon (1906–1987), U.S. district judge
- Vicki Stone (1949—), artist
- Philip Wasserman (1828–1895), 20th mayor of Portland
- Ron Wyden (1949–) U.S. senator from Oregon

== See also ==
- Kenny & Zuke's Delicatessen
- Portland Jewish Academy

== Sources ==
- Bergen, Teresa; Davis, Heide (2021). Historic Cemeteries of Portland, Oregon. Mount Pleasant, South Carolina: Arcadia Publishing. ISBN 978-1-467-14861-0.
