= Hurn Museum =

Coordinates: 32.0719°N 81.0951°W

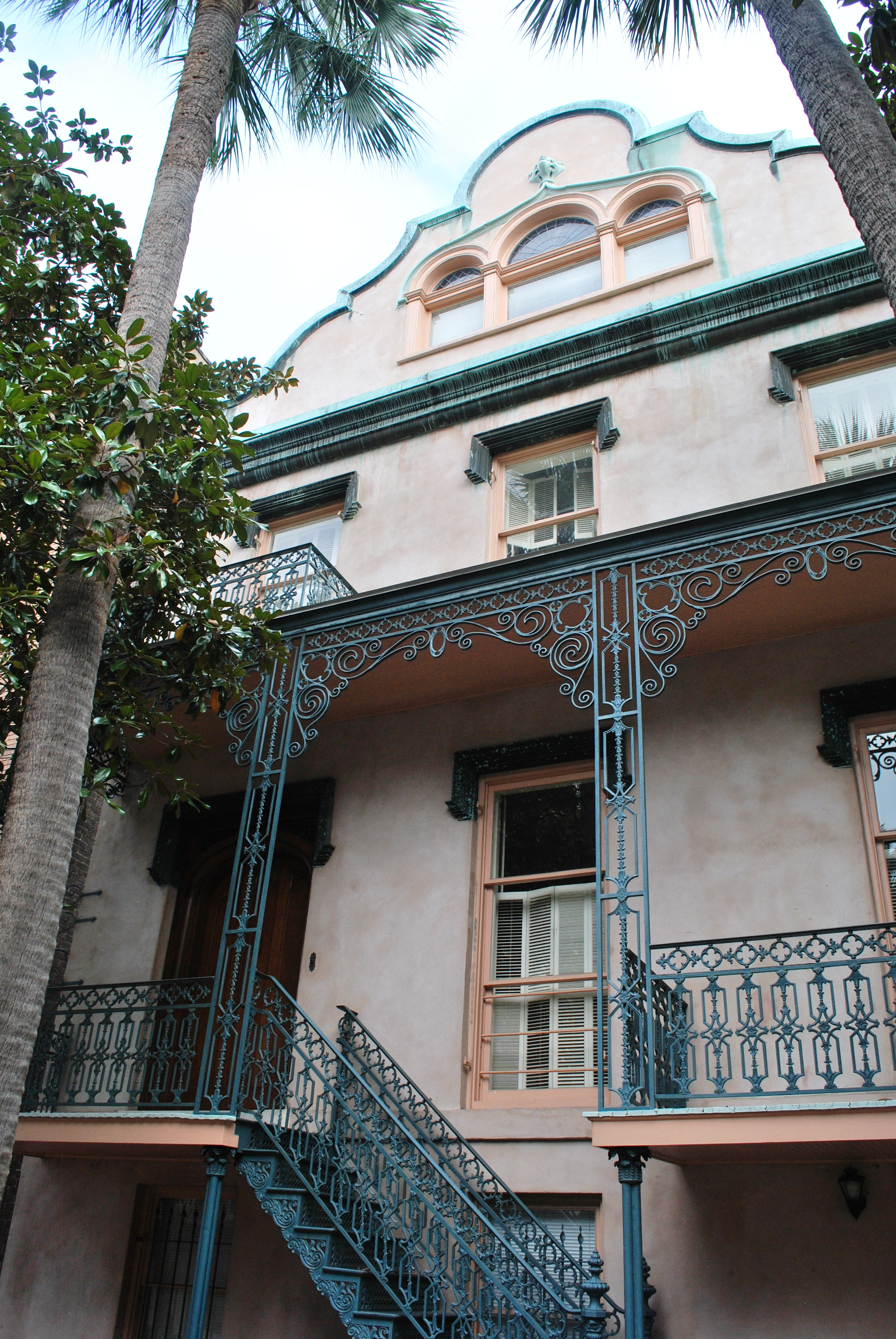
- Established: 2004
- Location: 10 West Taylor Street; Savannah, Georgia; United States
- Type: Art museum
- Website: www.hurnmuseum.org

The Hurn Museum is a museum on Monterey Square in Savannah, Georgia, United States, devoted to American folk art, as well as the work of international self-taught artists. The museum is named after the late Deborah Hurn, a local champion of folk art in Savannah.

The museum was opened in November 2004 by the Sottile family. The museum was viewed as controversial because it rejected the handicraft definition of folk art in favour of fine art. "Fine art separated the decorative arts years ago. We have to do the same with folk art" said co-founder Michael Sottile.
