= Congregation Beth Israel (Portland, Oregon) =

Jewish synagogue in Portland, Oregon, U.S.

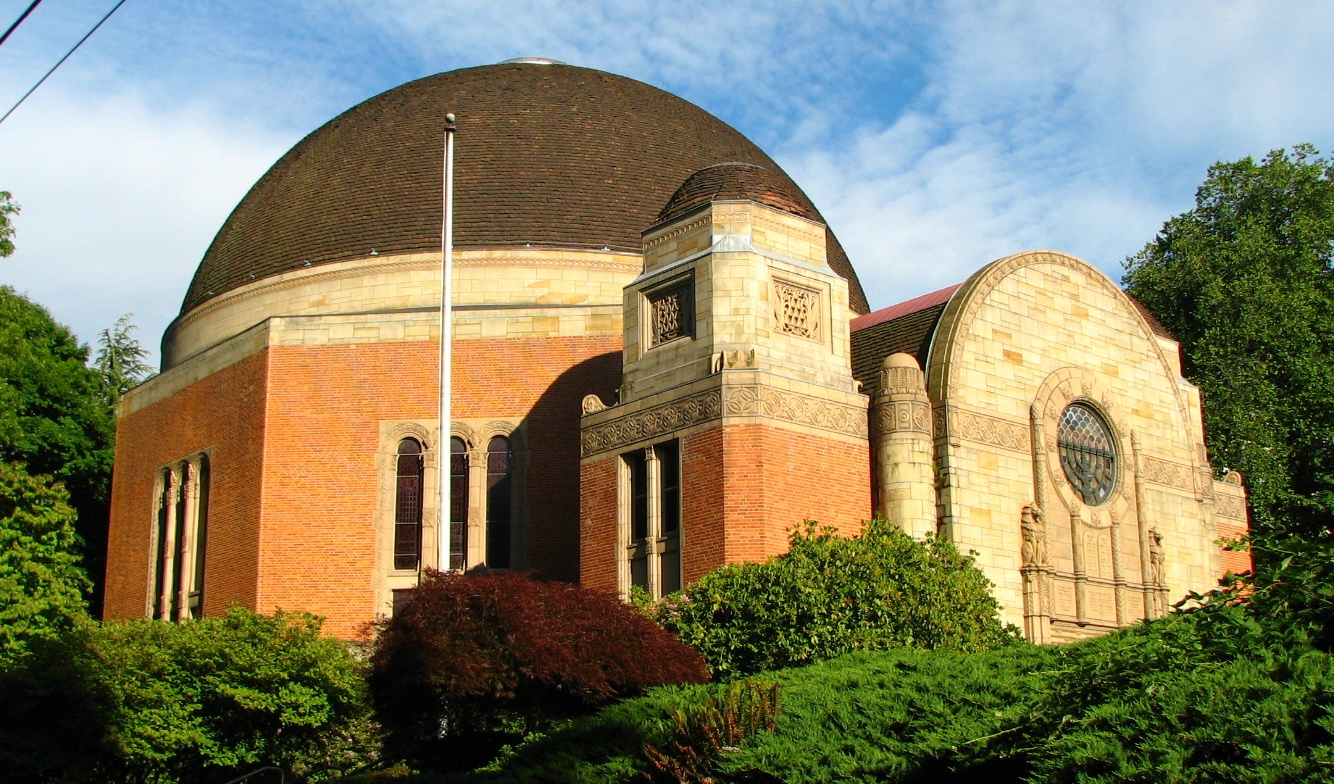
- Temple Beth Israel (2008)

- Location in Portland, Oregon

Religion
- Affiliation: Reform Judaism
- Ecclesiastical or organisational status: Synagogue
- Status: Active

Location
- Location: 1972 NW Flanders Street, Portland, Oregon
- Country: United States
- Coordinates: 45°31′34″N 122°41′28″W

Architecture
- Architects: Morris H. Whitehouse; Herman Brookman; Harry A. Herzog
- Type: Synagogue
- Style: Neo-Byzantine
- Established: 1858 (as a congregation)
- Completed: 1859 (wooden synagogue); 1889 (destroyed by 1923 fire); 1928 (NRHP-listed site)
- Temple Beth Israel
- U.S. National Register of Historic Places
- U.S. Historic district – Contributing property
- Built: 1926–1928
- Part of: Alphabet Historic District (ID00001293)
- NRHP reference No.: 79002141
- Added to NRHP: July 26, 1979

Congregation Beth Israel is a Reform Jewish congregation and synagogue, located at 1972 NW Flanders Street, Portland, Oregon, in the United States.

== History ==
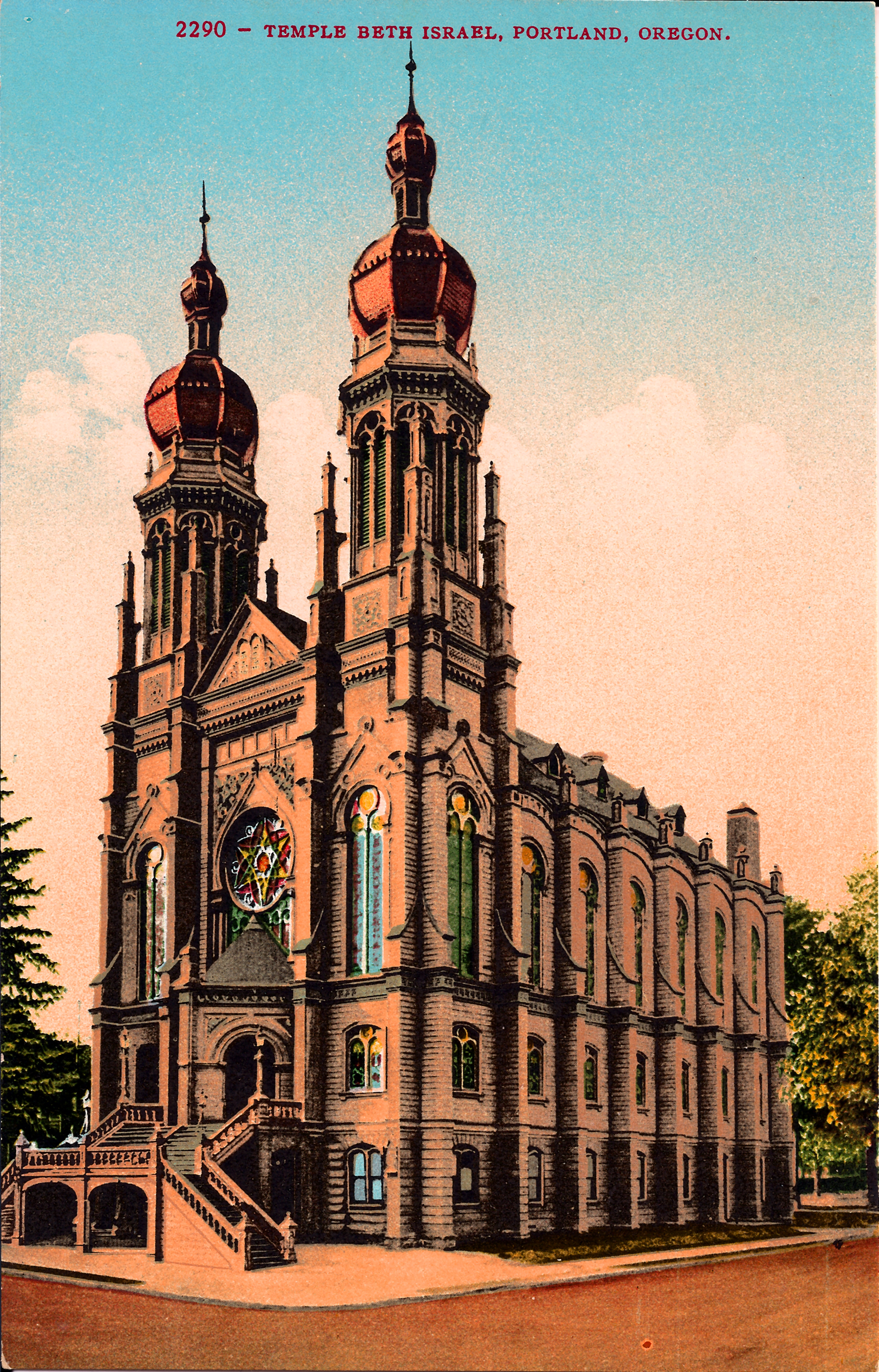
Postcard depicting the 1889 synagogue; destroyed by fire in 1923.

The congregation was founded in 1858, while Oregon was still a territory. The congregation's first building, constructed in 1859, was a modest, single story, pitched-roof, wood-framed, clapboard building with Gothic pointed-arch windows and door.

A new synagogue building replaced this early structure in 1889; a fire destroyed that synagogue in December 1923. Designed by Portland architect Warren H. Williams, the building, described as Moorish Revival design in some sources, is elsewhere described as a combination of eclectic and Gothic Revival styles, with two towers topped by bulbous domes. The Oregonian newspaper described its style as "semi-Gothic and Mooresque" in 1923. Located at S.W. 12th and Main Streets in downtown Portland, its two towers stood 165 ft (50 m) tall; the main interior space measured 82 by 56 feet (25 m × 17 m), and featured an arched ceiling 52 feet (16 m) high.

It was replaced in 1928 by the landmark Neo-Byzantine synagogue building at N.W. 19th and Flanders that continues to serve the congregation. Listed as Temple Beth Israel on the National Register of Historic Places in 1979, the building is considered one of the finest examples of Neo-Byzantine-style architecture on the west coast, and was inspired by the Alte Synagoge (Steelerstrasse Synagogue) in Essen, Germany. The interior of Steelerstrasse, the first modern synagogue in Germany, was praised as Germany's most beautiful before its destruction during the November Pogrom of 1938.

== See also ==
- Beth Israel Cemetery
- Culture of Portland, Oregon
- History of the Jews in Oregon
- Oregon Jewish Museum
