= Oregon Jewish Museum =

Museum of the history of the Jews of Oregon

Oregon Jewish Museum and Center for Holocaust Education
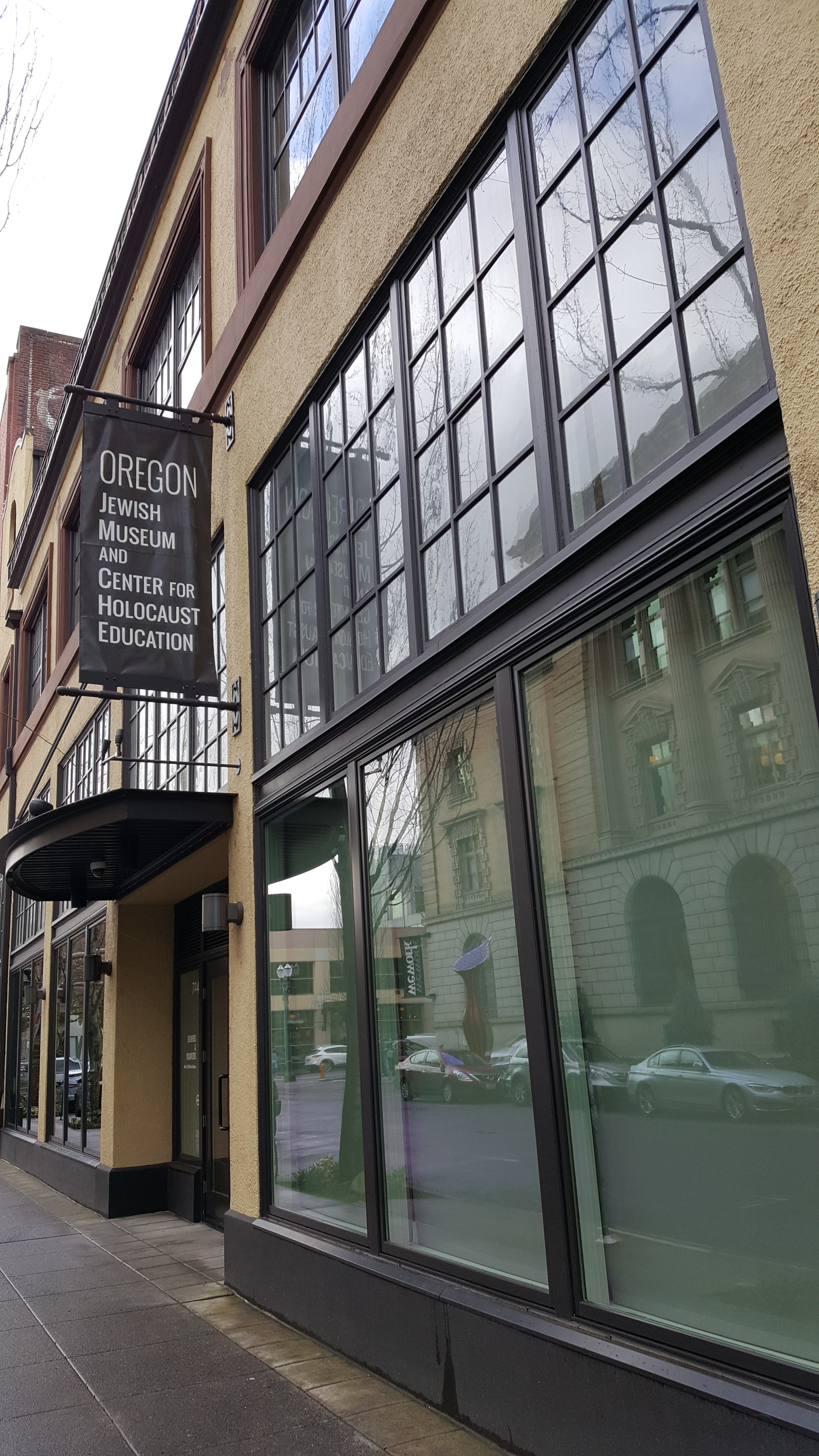
- The museum's entrance, 2018

- Location within Portland
- Location: 724 NW Davis St, Portland, Oregon
- Website: www.ojmche.org

The Oregon Jewish Museum and Center for Holocaust Education is the largest museum dedicated to the documented and visual history of the Jews of Oregon, United States. The museum is dedicated to the preservation, research, and exhibition of art, archival materials, and artifacts of the Jews and Judaism in Oregon.

The museum's archival collection contains records of its various community-based and traveling exhibitions, cultural programs and events, and educational outreach about Jewish identity, culture, and assimilation.

== History ==
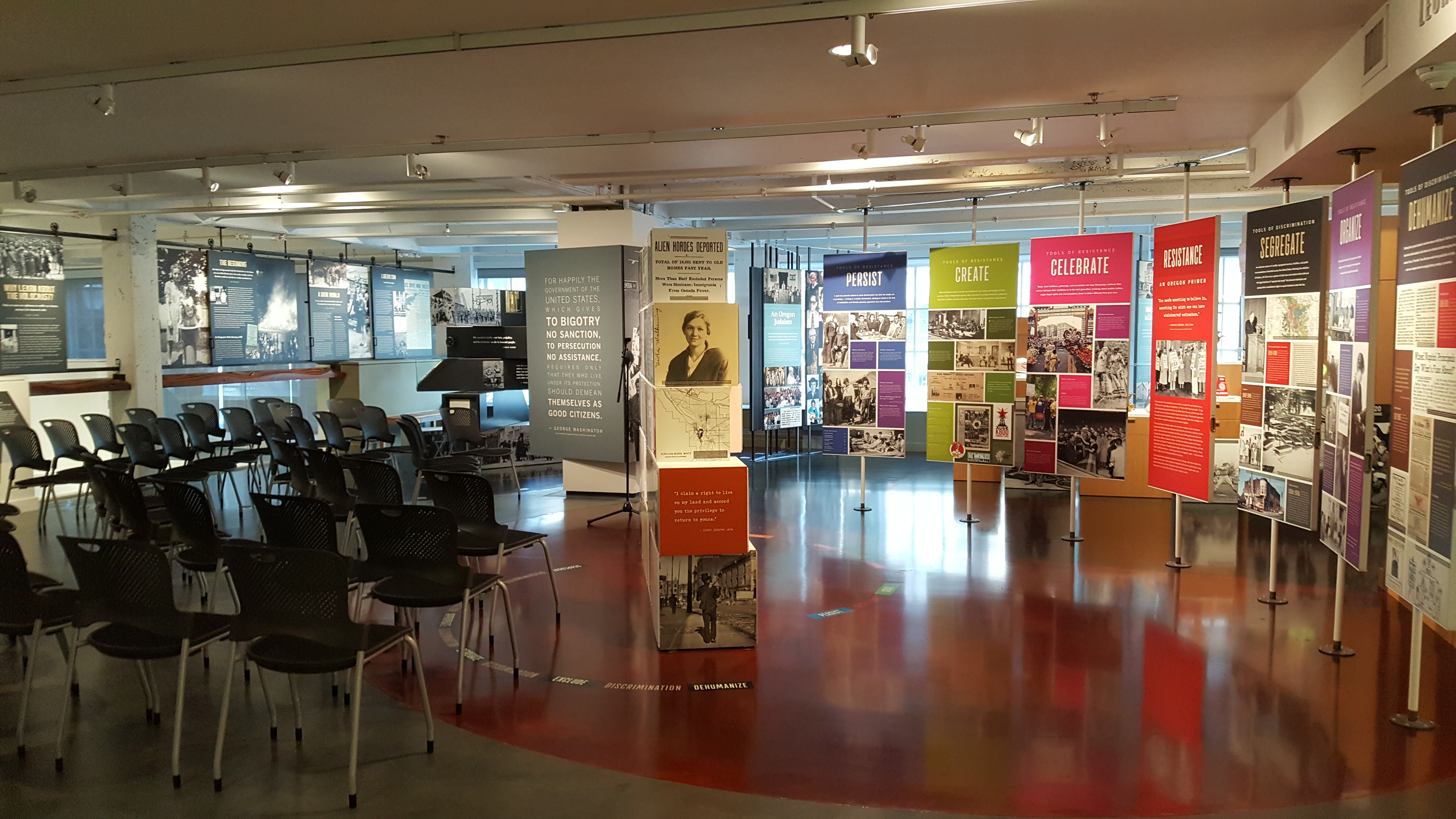
Interior, 2018

The Museum began in 1989 when a Portland rabbi, Rabbi Joshua Stampfer, invited members of Portland's Jewish community to a meeting at his synagogue to explore the idea of creating the first Jewish museum in the Pacific Northwest.

Some of the exhibits the museum sponsored in their first years include: The Jews of Greece; In the Footsteps of Columbus; The Legacy of Bezalel; Jews, Germany, and Memory, among others. These early exhibits were hosted in a variety of spaces including the Central Library, art galleries, other libraries and synagogues.

In 1996, the Museum merged with the Jewish History Society of Oregon and acquired their archives, comprising major collections of organizational records, family papers, photographs and ephemeral materials dating from 1850 to the present—the largest collection of the documented and visual history of Oregon's Jews. The Oregon Historical Society provided a small office in which to store and process these papers. Today this collection forms the core of the museum archives.

In July 1998, the hired its first director. At the same time, the museum moved into a donated office suite at Montgomery Park in Northwest Portland. When OJM left Montgomery Park in October 2000, the museum moved to a storefront location elsewhere in Northwest Portland.

In 2001, the museum moved to a storefront in the Pearl District and opened its first major community-based exhibition, A Call to Serve: Oregon Jews in the Armed Services, which examined the experience of Oregon Jews who served in the United States Military.

In 2009, the current building in Northwest Portland was identified. Within five months, the board raised funds for the architectural makeover of the former commercial film building and the museum opened to the public on December 20, 2009.

In 2014 the Oregon Jewish Museum merged with the Center for Holocaust Education.

In June 2017 the museum changed locations to 724 NW Davis Street and upsized to a 15,000 square foot building.

== Core exhibitions ==
- Discrimination and Resistance, An Oregon Primer curated by Janice Dilg documents Oregon’s history of discrimination from its territorial days, into statehood, and up through the twentieth century. It also chronicles the numerous ways individuals and groups have resisted and overcome discrimination through that same time period.
- Oregon Jewish Stories documents the experience of Oregon’s Jewish community from its beginnings in the Gold Rush era of the 1840s through today. It explores the questions of identity that many Oregon Jews wrestle with and explores the experience of Jews throughout the state.
- The Holocaust, An Oregon Perspective examines Holocaust history through the stories of people who survived the Holocaust and later made their home in Oregon and Southwest Washington, and as such, is about both Holocaust history and about Oregon. Rooted in the past yet engaging visitors in the present, this exhibit meets visitors where they are, posing questions like “What brings you here today?” and “How do you feel about what you’ve seen here today?”

== Previous rotating exhibitions ==
- Hans Coper - Less Means More, June 6 - September 22, 2019.
- Betty LaDuke - Early Work, June 6 - September 22, 2019.
- Mel Bochner - Enough Said from the collections of Jordan D. Schnitzer and His Family Foundation. March 7 - May 26, 2019.
- The Last Journey of the Jews of Lodz. October 9, 2018 - February 24, 2019.
- R.B. Kitaj: A Jew Etc., Etc.. June 7 - September 30, 2018.
- Vedem: The Underground Magazine of the Terezin Ghetto. February 16 - May 27, 2018.
- I Am This, Art by Oregon Jewish Artists. October 19, 2017 - February 4, 2018.
- Munich to Portland: A Painting Saves A Family. October 19, 2017 - February 4, 2018.
- Alefbet: The Alphabet of Memory. June 11 - October 1, 2017.
- "Illuminated Letters: Threads of Connection" by Sara Harwin. February - May 2014.
- Settling In. May–September, 2013.
- Pictures of Resistance: The Wartime Photographs of Faye Schulman. February – April, 2013.
- Oregon or Bust: 1936, Arthur Rothstein photographs. Spring, 2013.
- In the Game. May–September 2012.
- Transport: Works by Henk Pander and Esther Podemski. January–March, 2012.
- 48 Jews Works by Abshalom Jac Lahav. June–September, 2009.

== See also ==
- Culture of Portland, Oregon
