= Margaret Strachan =

American politician

- Strachan in 1986

Portland City Commissioner, Position 3
- In office 1981–1986
- Preceded by: Frank Ivancie
- Succeeded by: Bob Koch

Personal details
- Born: Margaret Darcy; 1935 (age 90–91) Helena, Montana
- Party: Democratic
- Education: Carroll College
- Occupation: Teacher, campaign manager, City Commissioner

Margaret D. Strachan (pronounced STRAWN) (born 1935) is an American politician who served on the Portland City Council, in Portland, Oregon, from 1981 to 1986. She was the first woman elected to the Council (Connie McCready and Mildred Schwab were appointed).

== Early life and education ==
She was born Margaret Darcy in Helena, Montana. She graduated from Carroll College with a degree in English and became a high-school teacher. She taught in Montana for three years until she moved to Portland in 1973.

== Activism and political career ==
She worked as a neighborhood activist, including as a coordinator for the City of Portland's Office of Neighborhood Associations and later on the staff of Commissioner Mike Lindberg as a liaison to neighborhood organizations. She was the campaign manager for Charles Jordan's first run for election to the city council, in 1974, after Jordan was initially appointed to the council.

She was elected to the Portland City Council in March 1981, and was sworn in on April 9, 1981. (Until 2024, members of the Portland City Council were officially known as commissioners, because Portland used a city commission form of government.) Her 1981 election was to a partial term only, to fill a vacancy on the council created in November 1980 as a result of Frank Ivancie's succeeding Connie McCready as mayor, but she won re-election in May 1982.

She ran for re-election again in 1986, but lost to Bob Koch and her time on the council ended at the end of 1986. During her term she was involved in developing the Central City Plan and building public housing along the Park Blocks.

In 1988, she became the Executive Director of Central City Concern, a Portland non-profit that provides resources to homeless people. She left the organization a year later, in March 1989.

== Personal life ==
Margaret Darcy married Jim Strachan in 1954, at age 19, and became Margaret Strachan. They divorced before she moved to Portland. In Oregon, she married Sumner Sharpe. She is currently retired and living in Montana.
