= 1996 Portland, Oregon, City Commission election =

The 1996 Portland City Commission elections were held on May 21, 1996, and November 5, 1996, to elect three positions on the Portland, Oregon City Council.

Jim Francesconi and Charlie Hales won positions 1 and 4, respectively, after a primary and runoff election. Erik Sten won election to position 2 during a special general election due to Earl Blumenauer's election to the US House of Representatives.

== Position 1 ==
Portland City Commission Position 1 election, 1996
- May 21, 1996 & November 5, 1996

| Candidate | Jim Francesconi | Gail Shibley | Erik Sten |
| Party | Nonpartisan | Nonpartisan | Nonpartisan |
| First round | 27,942; 31.15% | 27,631; 30.80% | 20,616; 22.98% |
| Second round | 97,164; 52.06% | 88,065; 47.19% | Eliminated |
Commissioner before election
Mike Lindberg
Elected Commissioner
Jim Francesconi

Jim Francesconi and Gail Shibley won the primary election. Jim Francesconi won the general election.

Position 1 primary election, 1996
| Party | Candidate | Votes | % |
|---|---|---|---|
| Nonpartisan | Jim Francesconi | 27,942 | 31.15% |
| Nonpartisan | Gail Shibley | 27,631 | 30.80% |
| Nonpartisan | Erik Sten | 20,616 | 22.98% |
| Nonpartisan | Bob Bennett | 4,781 | 5.33% |
| Nonpartisan | Bob Bloodgood | 3,557 | 3.96% |
| Nonpartisan | Dale E. Sherbourne | 2,345 | 2.61% |
| Nonpartisan | Peter S. Nilsson | 1,397 | 1.55% |
| Nonpartisan | Jada Mae Langloss | 1,026 | 1.14% |
| Write-in | | 400 | 0.44% |
| Total votes | | 89,695 | 100 |

Position 1 runoff election, 1996
| Party | Candidate | Votes | % |
|---|---|---|---|
| Nonpartisan | Jim Francesconi | 97,164 | 52.06% |
| Nonpartisan | Gail Shibley | 88,065 | 47.19% |
| Write-in | | 1387 | 0.74% |
| Total votes | | 186,616 | 100 |

== Position 2 (special) ==
Portland City Commission Position 2 special election, 1996
- November 5, 1996

| Candidate | Erik Sten | Chuck Duffy |
| Party | Nonpartisan | Nonpartisan |
| Popular vote | 109,227 | 70,542 |
| Percentage | 60.18% | 38.86% |
City Commission before election
Randy Leonard
Nonpartisan
Elected City Commission
Randy Leonard
Nonpartisan

Erik Sten won the special election due to Earl Blumenauer's election to the US House of Representatives.

Position 2 special election, 1996
| Party | Candidate | Votes | % |
|---|---|---|---|
| Nonpartisan | Erik Sten | 109,227 | 60.18% |
| Nonpartisan | Chuck Duffy | 70,542 | 38.86% |
| Write-in | | 1,722 | 0.94% |
| Total votes | | 181,491 | 100 |

== Position 4 ==
Portland City Commission Position 4 election, 1996
- May 21, 1996 & November 5, 1996
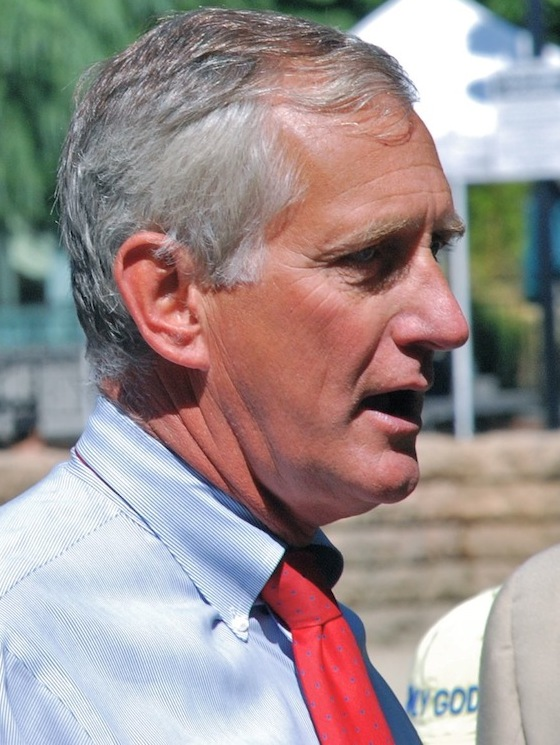

| Candidate | Charlie Hales | Paul McCoy | Tom O'Connor |
| Party | Nonpartisan | Nonpartisan | Nonpartisan |
| First round | 46,901; 55.77% | 25,029; 29.76% | 11,415; 13.57% |
| Second round | 125,412; 95.71% | Eliminated | Eliminated |
Commissioner before election
Charlie Hales
Elected Commissioner
Charlie Hales

Charlie Hales and Paul McCoy won the primary election. McCoy dropped out before the general election and Hales won outright.

Position 4 primary election, 1996
| Party | Candidate | Votes | % |
|---|---|---|---|
| Nonpartisan | Charlie Hales | 46,901 | 55.77% |
| Nonpartisan | Paul McCoy | 25,029 | 29.76% |
| Nonpartisan | Tom O'Connor | 11,415 | 13.57% |
| Write-in | | 741 | 0.88% |
| Total votes | | 84,086 | 100 |

Position 4 runoff election, 1996
| Party | Candidate | Votes | % |
|---|---|---|---|
| Nonpartisan | Charlie Hales | 125,412 | 95.71% |
| Write-in | | 39,207 | 5.29% |
| Total votes | | 131,030 | 100 |
