= 1980 Portland, Oregon, mayoral elections =

- May 20, 1980
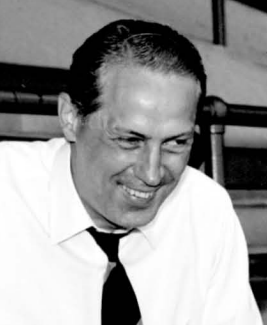

Candidate	Frank Ivancie	Connie McCready
Party	Nonpartisan	Nonpartisan
Regular election	64,354; 53.18%	50,617; 41.83%
Special election	64,143; 52.55%	52,812; 43.27%
Mayor before election
Connie McCready (Note: In September 1979, McCready was appointed by her fellow city councilors to fill the vacancy caused by the resignation of Mayor Neil Goldschmidt, who had been appointed United States Secretary of Transportation.)
Elected mayor
Frank Ivancie

Two elections for the position of mayor of Portland, Oregon, were held concurrently on May 20, 1980. There were two ballot items for the same office: a special election to fill the seat for the final weeks of the current term (ending January 3, 1981), and another primary election for a full term (beginning the same day). City commissioner Frank Ivancie defeated acting mayor Connie McCready in both races. Because he received an absolute majority in the election for the full term, no run-off election was held.

Portland uses a nonpartisan system for local elections, in which all voters are eligible to participate. All candidates are listed on the ballot without any political party affiliation. Despite officially being listed as nonpartisan, Ivancie was a Conservative Democrat and McCready was a Republican. This was the last Portland mayoral election with a major Republican candidate.

== Candidates ==
=== Regular election ===
- Frank Ivancie, city commissioner
- Connie McCready, incumbent mayor
- Norman A. Berberick, engineer
- William L. Patrick
- Fred Auger
- Joseph H. Harris
- Judson Longaker

=== Special election ===
- Frank Ivancie, city commissioner
- Connie McCready, incumbent mayor
- Norman A. Berberick, engineer
- William L. Patrick

== Results ==
=== Regular election ===
1980 Portland mayoral election
Party	Candidate	Votes	%
Nonpartisan	Frank Ivancie	64,354	53.18
Nonpartisan	Connie McCready (incumbent)	50,617	41.83
Nonpartisan	Norman A. Berberick	2,543	2.10
Nonpartisan	William L. Patrick	1,677	1.38
Nonpartisan	Fred Auger	833	0.68
Nonpartisan	Joseph H. Harris	385	0.31
Nonpartisan	Judson Longaker	279	0.23
Write-in		311	0.25
Total votes		120,999	100

=== Special election ===
1980 Portland mayoral special election
Party	Candidate	Votes	%
Nonpartisan	Frank Ivancie	64,143	52.55
Nonpartisan	Connie McCready (incumbent)	52,812	43.27
Nonpartisan	Norman A. Berberick	2,803	2.29
Nonpartisan	William L. Patrick	1,990	1.63
Write-in		304	0.24
Total votes		122,052	100
