= 1900 Portland, Oregon, mayoral election =

1900 Portland, Oregon mayoral election
- June 6, 1900
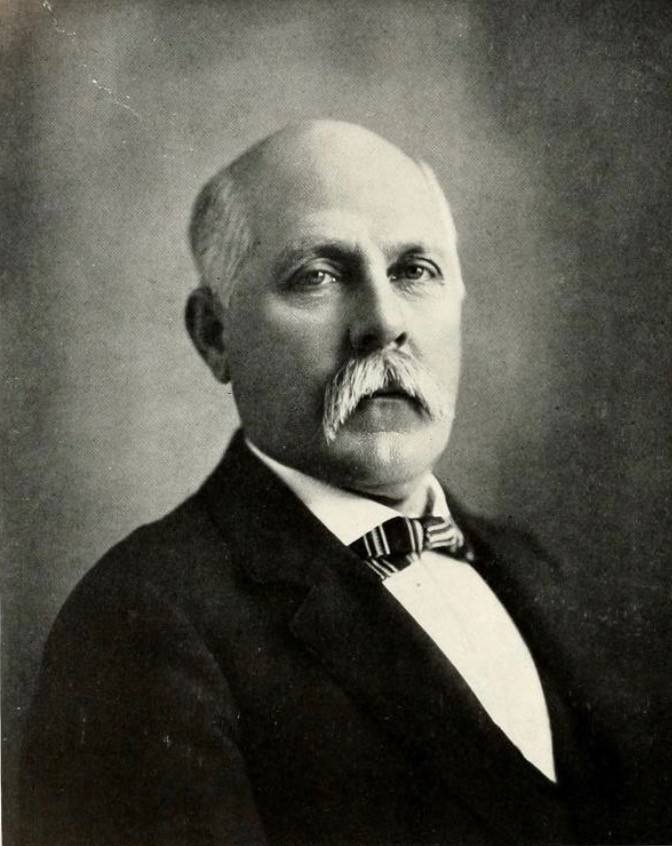

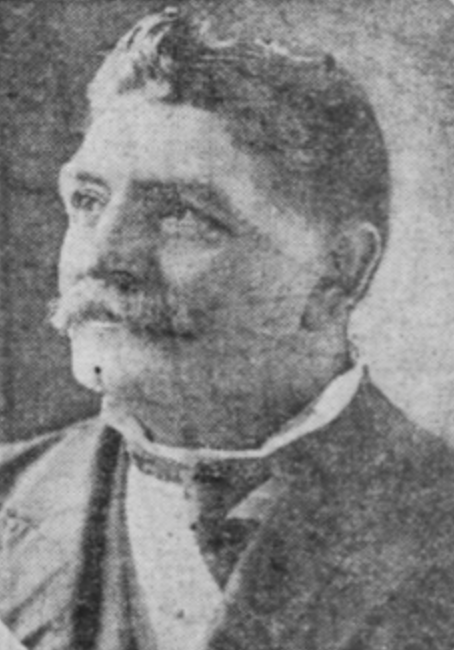

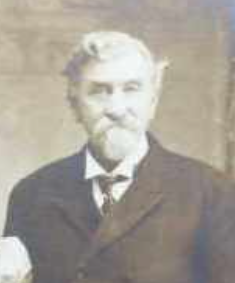
Nominee	Henry S. Rowe	William A. Storey	George Milton Wells
Party	Republican	Independent	Democratic
Popular vote	4,691	3,618	3,561
Percentage	37.87%	29.21%	28.75%
Mayor before election
William A. Storey
Independent
Elected Mayor
Henry S. Rowe
Republican

The 1900 Portland mayoral election was held on June 5, 1900 to elect the Mayor of Portland, Oregon.

Republican railroad employee Henry S. Rowe defeated incumbent Independent William A. Storey and Democratic doctor G. M. Wells.

== Results ==
1900 Portland, Oregon mayoral election
Party	Candidate	Votes	%	±%
Republican	Henry S. Rowe	4,691	37.87%	
Independent	William A. Storey	3,618	29.21%	
Democratic	George Milton Wells	3,561	28.75%	
Progressive	McKercher	367	2.96%	
Socialist Labor	Kafka	148	1.19%	
Total votes		12,385	100.00%	
