= Columbia Indoor Pool =

Pool facility in Portland, Oregon, U.S.

- Interactive map of the Columbia Indoor Pool area
- Alternative names: Columbia Pool

General information
- Location: Portland, Oregon, 7701 N Chautauqua Blvd
- Coordinates: 45.579576°N 122.708756°W
- Completed: 1927
- Renovated: 1975
- Owner: City of Portland

Website
- portland.gov

The Columbia Indoor Pool is an indoor year-round public pool facility located in Portland in the U.S. state of Oregon. Originally constructed as an open-air pool in the late 1920s, a wooden-dome roof was added in 1975. The facility was closed due to the COVID-19 pandemic, with the closure declared permanent due to structural issues in December 2022.

== History ==
The pool facility was originally built in 1927 as a bathhouse and outdoor pool. The building was designed by Knighton and Howell, Architects and Engineers.

In 1975, a roof was constructed over the existing pool to enclose for year-round use, making it Portland's first public indoor pool. The structure was designed by Loyal Lang and is of architectural note as one of the only wooden dome structures in the Pacific Northwest. It has a unique and iconic structural system with a large skylight directing daylight into the pool.

Since 2008, the facility has fallen into increasing disrepair due to its age and deferred maintenance.

=== Financial Difficulties ===
In the Spring of 2019, the Portland City Council approved a $5.6 billion budget that would close several facilities throughout the city, including closing Columbia Pool by July 2020. In response, neighborhood organizers conducted several advocacy events throughout 2019 and 2020, which received positive coverage in local media. On March 6, Mayor Ted Wheeler announced the Portland City Council would fund Columbia Pool for another year, though the July 2021.

The City of Portland budgeted $453,428 in one-time funding provided to keep the pool open for the 2020-2021 fiscal year. That funding would support operations but would not address the maintenance shortfall. Studies showed that many facility components were beyond their useful life, and major upgrades would be required at estimated $2.0-5.0 million cost. A further $90,000 per year in ongoing maintenance would be required following these repairs.

=== Closures ===
==== Closure due to COVID-19 ====
Just as Columbia Pool emerged from its proposed shutdown, it was shuttered on March 23 because of the emerging COVID-19 pandemic. Portland Parks and Recreation kept all public pool facilities closed through the summer. In June 2020, the Columbia Indoor Pool was not reopened along with other pools due to concerns with the building's structural integrity.

==== Closure due to Structural Conditions ====
The City of Portland retained multiple consultants in recent decades to inspect the aging facility. In 2008, a report by Professional Roof Consultants identified several issues with the roof and recommended a roofing system replacement, which has not been completed. In 2021 SEFT Consulting Group inspected the facility and identified multiple issues with the roof structure. They recommended the facility "should not be re-opened to the public until all life-safety hazards... are identified and repaired." The facility, which had already been closed since March 2020 due the COVID-19 pandemic, was "closed until further notice" on August 23, 2021, by Portland Parks & Recreation.

On September 22, 2021, Friends of Columbia Park released the Columbia Pool Community Task Force Facilities Assessment Report.

== Amenities ==
The pool is 25 yards long by 25 yards wide and features 5 deep lanes and 2 shallow lanes, with water depth ranging from two to seven feet. It is heated to 86 °F (30 °C). The City previously had plans to upgrade the facility to add water play features to make it "more fun and inviting".

The facility can be reached by the #4 Fessenden, #35 Greely, #44 Mocks Crest, and #75 Chavez/Lombard bus lines operated by Trimet. Parking and ADA accessible entrances are offered.

== Programs and Users ==
=== Programs ===
When in operation, Portland Parks & Recreations offered swim lessons, lap swim, water fitness classes and recreational play swims. Additionally, the pool was used for practice and meets by several public schools, swim teams, and leagues. Swim lessons were offered to elementary school students in partnership with Portland Public Schools until its closure.

=== Users ===
In a typical year, Columbia Pool's attendance was 60,000 users. The Portsmouth neighborhood in which the pool is located is the 4th most diverse of 91 in Portland, and no other neighborhood west of 82nd Avenue is more diverse. Portland has been criticized for providing uneven access to pool facilities amongst the city's neighborhoods.

== Future Aquatic Center Plans ==
The City of Portland has determined it needs "enough pool capacity to accommodate 1% of the population at any one time", but as of 2006 was only able to reach 60% of this goal. While the city's population has increased by 12.2% over the last decade, Portland Parks & Recreation has not increased pool capacity to match, so the Columbia Pool closure will continue to reduce the aquatic facilities' level of service.

The nearest pool is at Peninsula Park and the nearest indoor pool is at Matt Dishman Community center 4 miles away. Portland Parks & Recreation is concerned the closure means "that they cannot meet the demand for service". The city has long-term plans to build a pool at Charles Jordan Community Center, but expected completion dates are 5 years or more away. In April 2021, Commissioner Carmen Rubio asked her department to move forward with plans to create a new aquatics center in North Portland and directed $11.7 million in Park System Development Charges to cover planning and design efforts. The initial estimated cost of the facility is $35 million, which has not been allocated.
