= Frank Ivancie =

American businessman and politician (1924–2019)

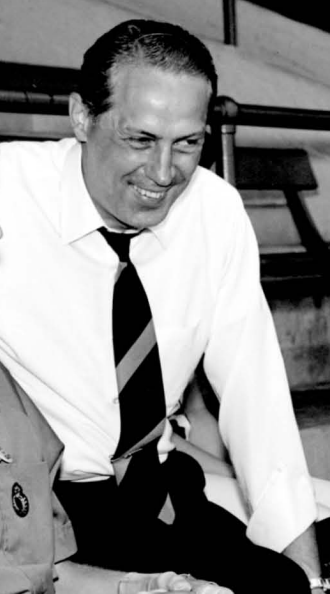

Commissioner of the Federal Maritime Commission
- In office November 18, 1985 – June 30, 1992
- Nominated by: Ronald Reagan
- Preceded by: Robert Setrakian
- Succeeded by: Delmond J. H. Won

47th Mayor of Portland, Oregon
- In office November 24, 1980 – January 2, 1985
- Preceded by: Connie McCready
- Succeeded by: Bud Clark

Portland City Commissioner
- In office 1967–1980
- Preceded by: Ormond R. Bean
- Succeeded by: Margaret Strachan

Personal details
- Born: Francis James Ivancie; July 19, 1924 Marble, Minnesota, U.S.
- Died: May 2, 2019 (aged 94) California, U.S.
- Party: Democratic
- Profession: Politician, businessman
- Military career
- Allegiance: United States
- Branch: United States Army Air Forces
- Service years: 1942–1943
- Conflicts: World War II

Francis James Ivancie (July 19, 1924 – May 2, 2019) was an American businessman and politician who served as mayor of Portland, Oregon, from 1980 to 1985. Prior to his term as mayor, Ivancie served for fourteen years on the Portland City Council. After his retirement from elected office, Ivancie remained active in community affairs, occasionally lending his support to political causes. During his political career, Ivancie was a conservative Democrat.

== Education and career before politics ==
Frank Ivancie was born in Marble, Minnesota. His father was an immigrant from Ljubljana, Slovenia (then part of Yugoslavia). He graduated from the University of Minnesota with a bachelor's degree in sociology. He subsequently moved to Oregon, where he earned a master's degree in education from the University of Oregon. During World War II, he served in the United States Army Air Forces.

After the war, Ivancie began working as a teacher in Burns, Oregon where he met his future wife Eileen O'Toole with whom he had 10 children. He moved to Washington County, in the Portland metropolitan area, to take a position as principal of Orenco School, in Orenco, Oregon. After a period in the 1950s working in England as principal of an American school run by the Department of Defense, Ivancie returned to Oregon and taught for Portland Public Schools. He left teaching in 1956 when hired as executive assistant to then-mayor-elect Terry Schrunk.

== Early political career ==
Ivancie was first elected to the Portland City Council in 1966, filling a vacancy on the Council when Ormond Bean did not run for re-election to the post. He took office on January 4, 1967. He was re-elected to the Council several times, in 1970, 1974, and 1978, only serving the first two years of his final term.

In 1976, Ivancie launched his first campaign for mayor, running against one-term incumbent Neil Goldschmidt. A key issue in the campaign was the Mount Hood Freeway, a controversial freeway proposal which the City Council had killed by a vote of 4–1 in 1974 (Ivancie casting the lone dissenting vote) and which Ivancie and his supporters hoped to revive. Billboards were erected proclaiming "If Ivancie were mayor, you'd be home now". Unfortunately for Ivancie, the primary beneficiaries of the proposed freeway project were suburban commuters who were ineligible to vote for the mayor of Portland. City residents were in widespread opposition to the freeway (which was never built), and Goldschmidt handily won re-election, defeating Ivancie in the primary election. (The Portland mayoral election is held in May of years divisible by four; if no candidate secures a majority in the primary then a run-off election is held in November between the top two vote-getters in the primary election.)

== Tenure as mayor ==
In 1979, Goldschmidt resigned as the city's mayor to take a post with the Carter Administration as United States Secretary of Transportation, and fellow commissioner Connie McCready was appointed to fill the remainder of Goldschmidt's term. Ivancie then ran for mayor again in 1980 against McCready—a candidate who had neither the populist appeal of Goldschmidt nor the powerful backing of Ivancie—and defeated her in the primary election. The primary election that year occurred on May 20, 1980. He was sworn in as mayor on November 24, 1980.

Portland's mayor typically also assumes the role of police commissioner, but Ivancie initially kept his colleague Charles Jordan, who had been assigned to the role in 1977 by Ivancie's predecessor, in the role. Ivancie later took over the police bureau. and had held it since 1977.

Ivancie's tenure as mayor was scandal-free; however, his conservative politics and pro-business positions were frequently controversial in Portland, a city with strong progressive leanings. Ivancie opposed the development of the popular Pioneer Courthouse Square on the grounds that the square would become a gathering place for transients. He oversaw the construction of the Portland Building and advocated construction of wells to back up the Bull Run Watershed—the city's primary source of drinking water. Much of the construction of the first MAX Light Rail line occurred during his tenure.

== Re-election campaign ==
In March 1984—two months prior to the election—Bud Clark trailed Ivancie by 35 points in one poll. However, the Clark campaign put together a large number of volunteers who canvassed the city. After an early May poll by The Oregonian showed the race tied, the Ivancie campaign replied with negative advertisements questioning Clark's religious beliefs (Clark has claimed to be a "born again pagan"). The ads offended Portland voters, who elected Clark to be the next mayor on May 15, by a margin of 13 points.

== Post-1984 political career ==
After the loss in the election, Ivancie briefly turned to national politics, heading up the Oregon branch of Democrats for Reagan; after Ronald Reagan's re-election, Ivancie was named to the Federal Maritime Commission. After this, he retired from politics and moved to California. He stayed out of the Portland public eye until 2007, when then-mayor Tom Potter proposed an amendment to the Portland city charter to convert the city from a commission form of government to a strong-mayor system. Ivancie, along with Bud Clark, lent support to those opposing the charter amendment; the proposal would go down to defeat.

Preceded by Connie McCready	Mayor of Portland, Oregon; 1980–1985	Succeeded by Bud Clark
