= 1986 Oregon gubernatorial election =

- November 4, 1986
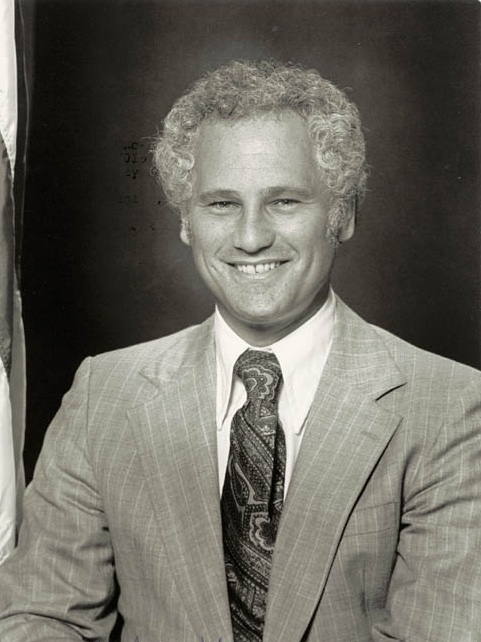

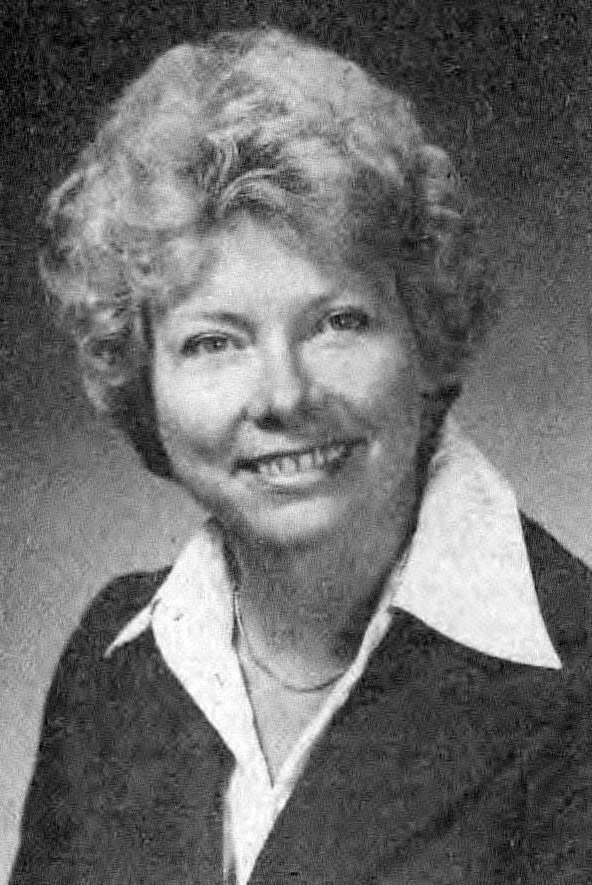
| Nominee | Neil Goldschmidt | Norma Paulus |
| Party | Democratic | Republican |
| Popular vote | 549,456 | 506,989 |
| Percentage | 51.85% | 47.85% |
- County results Goldschmidt: 50–60% Paulus: 50–60% 60–70% 70–80%
Governor before election
Victor Atiyeh
Republican
Elected Governor
Neil Goldschmidt
Democratic

The 1986 Oregon gubernatorial election took place on November 4, 1986. Democratic nominee Neil Goldschmidt defeated Republican Norma Paulus to win the election. As of 2025, this is the most recent Oregon gubernatorial election in which both major party candidates are now deceased.

== Primary election ==
Oregon held primary elections on May 20, 1986.

=== Republican party ===
==== Candidates ====
- Sanford L. Blau, retired realtor and jewelry dealer
- Betty Freauf, chairman of Marion County Republican Party
- Ben Kilpatrick, former Josephine County commissioner
- Juan J. Ortegon
- Norma Paulus, Oregon Secretary of State
- Joe C. Simpson
- William K. Sparks

==== Results ====
Republican primary results
| Party | Candidate | Votes | % |
|---|---|---|---|
| Republican | Norma Paulus | 219,505 | 77.04% |
| Republican | Betty Freauf | 36,384 | 12.77% |
| Republican | Ben Kilpatrick | 13,688 | 4.80% |
| Republican | Joe C. Simpson | 5,487 | 1.93% |
| Republican | Sanford L. Blau | 2,906 | 1.02% |
| Republican | William K. Sparks | 2,802 | 0.98% |
| Republican | Juan J. Ortegon | 2,577 | 0.90% |
| Republican | Scattering | 1,588 | 0.56% |
| Total votes | | 284,937 | 100.00% |

=== Democratic party ===
==== Candidates ====
- C. F. Barackman
- Edward Fadeley, former President of the Oregon State Senate
- Robert L. Forthan
- Neil Goldschmidt, former United States Secretary of Transportation and former Mayor of Portland
- Dave Jones, radio and television reporter and producer
- E. Allen Propst, perennial candidate
- George Thomas, RV salesman

==== Results ====
Democratic primary results
| Party | Candidate | Votes | % |
|---|---|---|---|
| Democratic | Neil Goldschmidt | 214,148 | 67.44% |
| Democratic | Edward Fadeley | 81,300 | 25.60% |
| Democratic | Dave Jones | 6,013 | 1.89% |
| Democratic | George Thomas | 4,383 | 1.38% |
| Democratic | C. F. Barackman | 4,175 | 1.31% |
| Democratic | E. Allen Propst | 3,157 | 0.99% |
| Democratic | Robert L. Forthan | 2,933 | 0.92% |
| Democratic | Scattering | 1,408 | 0.44% |
| Total votes | | 317,517 | 100.00% |

== General election ==
=== Results ===
1986 Oregon gubernatorial election
| Party | Candidate | Votes | % | ±% |
|---|---|---|---|---|
| Democratic | Neil Goldschmidt | 549,456 | 51.85% | +15.93% |
| Republican | Norma Paulus | 506,989 | 47.85% | −13.56% |
| Write-in | Scattering | 3,188 | 0.30% | |
| Total votes | | 1,059,630 | 100.00% | |
| Majority | | 42,470 | 4.01% | |
| Democratic gain from Republican | | Swing | +29.49% | |

=== Results by county ===
| County | Neil Goldschmidt Democratic | | Norma Paulus Republican | | Scattering Write-in | | Margin | | Total votes cast |
| County | # | % | # | % | # | % | # | % | Total votes cast |
|---|---|---|---|---|---|---|---|---|---|
| Baker | 3,193 | 50.88% | 2,847 | 45.37% | 235 | 3.75% | 346 | 5.51% | 6,275 |
| Benton | 15,327 | 55.45% | 12,247 | 44.31% | 65 | 0.24% | 3,080 | 11.14% | 27,639 |
| Clackamas | 51,352 | 48.30% | 54,756 | 51.50% | 208 | 0.20% | -3,404 | -3.20% | 106,316 |
| Clatsop | 7,659 | 58.65% | 5,371 | 41.13% | 29 | 0.22% | 2,288 | 17.52% | 13,059 |
| Columbia | 8,512 | 57.08% | 6,357 | 42.63% | 44 | 0.30% | 2,155 | 14.45% | 14,913 |
| Coos | 12,815 | 56.33% | 9,800 | 43.08% | 135 | 0.59% | 3,015 | 13.25% | 22,750 |
| Crook | 2,375 | 44.11% | 2,999 | 55.70% | 10 | 0.19% | -624 | -11.59% | 5,384 |
| Curry | 3,017 | 42.24% | 4,104 | 57.45% | 22 | 0.31% | -1,087 | -15.22% | 7,143 |
| Deschutes | 12,089 | 45.29% | 14,556 | 54.54% | 45 | 0.17% | -2,467 | -9.24% | 26,690 |
| Douglas | 16,663 | 49.05% | 17,085 | 50.29% | 222 | 0.65% | -422 | -1.24% | 33,970 |
| Gilliam | 371 | 41.73% | 518 | 58.27% | 0 | 0.00% | -147 | -16.54% | 889 |
| Grant | 1,135 | 34.74% | 2,100 | 64.28% | 32 | 0.98% | -965 | -29.54% | 3,267 |
| Harney | 1,079 | 35.98% | 1,896 | 63.22% | 24 | 0.80% | -817 | -27.24% | 2,999 |
| Hood River | 3,065 | 49.49% | 3,121 | 50.40% | 7 | 0.11% | -56 | -0.90% | 6,193 |
| Jackson | 21,502 | 42.14% | 29,432 | 57.67% | 97 | 0.19% | -7,930 | -15.54% | 51,031 |
| Jefferson | 1,914 | 44.24% | 2,389 | 55.22% | 23 | 0.53% | -475 | -10.98% | 4,326 |
| Josephine | 9,988 | 43.66% | 12,815 | 56.01% | 76 | 0.33% | -2,827 | -12.36% | 22,879 |
| Klamath | 9,136 | 43.42% | 11,852 | 56.33% | 54 | 0.26% | -2,716 | -12.91% | 21,042 |
| Lake | 1,450 | 42.52% | 1,955 | 57.33% | 5 | 0.15% | -505 | -14.81% | 3,410 |
| Lane | 58,826 | 56.36% | 45,272 | 43.37% | 286 | 0.27% | 13,554 | 12.98% | 104,384 |
| Lincoln | 8,702 | 55.76% | 6,892 | 44.17% | 11 | 0.07% | 1,810 | 11.60% | 15,605 |
| Linn | 19,707 | 58.85% | 13,781 | 41.15% | 0 | 0.00% | 5,926 | 17.70% | 33,488 |
| Malheur | 2,592 | 29.23% | 6,218 | 70.11% | 59 | 0.67% | -3,626 | -40.88% | 8,869 |
| Marion | 43,677 | 55.34% | 35,016 | 44.37% | 226 | 0.29% | 8,661 | 10.97% | 78,919 |
| Morrow | 1,439 | 47.49% | 1,584 | 52.28% | 7 | 0.23% | -145 | -4.79% | 3,030 |
| Multnomah | 134,376 | 57.15% | 99,817 | 42.45% | 955 | 0.41% | 34,559 | 14.70% | 235,148 |
| Polk | 10,100 | 53.93% | 8,565 | 45.73% | 64 | 0.34% | 1,535 | 8.20% | 18,729 |
| Sherman | 386 | 36.28% | 677 | 63.63% | 1 | 0.09% | -291 | -27.35% | 1,064 |
| Tillamook | 5,194 | 56.10% | 4,031 | 43.54% | 34 | 0.37% | 1,163 | 12.56% | 9,259 |
| Umatilla | 8,247 | 46.98% | 9,284 | 52.88% | 25 | 0.14% | -1,037 | -5.91% | 17,556 |
| Union | 4,885 | 51.21% | 4,655 | 48.79% | 0 | 0.00% | 230 | 2.41% | 9,540 |
| Wallowa | 1,343 | 42.98% | 1,767 | 56.54% | 15 | 0.48% | -424 | -13.57% | 3,125 |
| Wasco | 4,488 | 48.38% | 4,773 | 51.46% | 15 | 0.16% | -285 | -3.07% | 9,276 |
| Washington | 50,954 | 47.13% | 57,008 | 52.73% | 157 | 0.15% | -6,054 | -5.60% | 108,119 |
| Wheeler | 253 | 39.47% | 388 | 60.53% | 0 | 0.00% | -135 | -21.06% | 641 |
| Yamhill | 11,645 | 51.29% | 11,058 | 48.71% | 0 | 0.00% | 587 | 2.59% | 22,703 |
| Total | 549,456 | 51.85% | 509,986 | 47.85% | 3,188 | 0.30% | 42,470 | 4.01% | 1,059,630 |

==== Counties that flipped from Republican to Democratic ====
- Baker
- Benton
- Clatsop
- Columbia
- Coos
- Lane
- Lincoln
- Linn
- Marion
- Multnomah
- Polk
- Tillamook
- Union
- Yamhill
