= Charles Jordan (American politician) =

Portland City Commissioner (1937–2014)

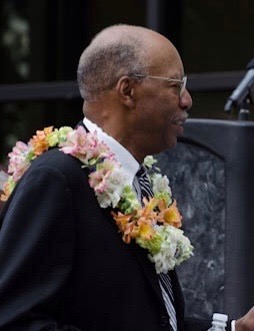
- Jordan in 2012

Portland City Commissioner
- In office March 1974 – September 27, 1984
- Preceded by: Lloyd Anderson
- Succeeded by: Dick Bogle
- Constituency: Portland, Oregon

Personal details
- Born: September 1, 1937 Longview, Texas
- Died: April 4, 2014 (aged 76) Portland, Oregon
- Occupation: City Commissioner; municipal parks director (Austin, TX, and later Portland, OR)
- Known for: Charles Jordan Community Center

Charles Ray Jordan (September 1, 1937 – April 4, 2014) was a Portland City Commissioner from 1974 until 1984. He was the first African-American city commissioner in Portland, Oregon, and is the namesake of the Charles Jordan Community Center.

== Early life ==
Jordan was born in 1937 in Longview, Texas. He graduated from Palm Springs High School in 1956 and received a basketball scholarship to Gonzaga University. Graduating in 1961, Jordan earned a Bachelor of Science degree in education, sociology, and philosophy and later attended graduate studies at both Loma Linda University and the University of Southern California, studying education at Loma Linda and public policy at USC.

== Career ==
During the 1960s, Jordan served in the parks and recreation department for the City of Palm Springs and became an assistant to the City Manager. In 1970, Jordan moved to Portland to help with the federal anti-poverty Model Cities Program.

=== City Council ===
Members of Portland city council appointed Jordan to a seat vacated by commissioner Lloyd Anderson on the city council in March 1974. Mayor Neil Goldschmidt, who had announced his intent to appoint the first Black member of City Council, ensured that there were enough votes to make the appointment in a way that commissioner Connie McCready alleged violated the intent of Oregon's open meeting laws. Jordan was the city's first African-American city commissioner (members of the city council are called "commissioners" under Portland's city commission government form). He was elected to the council seat in November 1974, to complete the final two years of the term, and re-elected in 1976 and 1980.

In 1977, shortly after appointing Bruce Baker Police Chief and after having informally offered the police bureau to Connie McCready, Goldschmidt assigned the police bureau to Jordan. Jordan expressed displeasure with his assignments, since Goldschmidt simultaneously removed two significant bureaus from his portfolio without warning, and also retained his own power, under the city charter, to hire and fire the chief of police. Jordan held the post until 1981. In that year, two Portland police officers drew national attention for a racially motivated prank. The officers were fired under Jordan's watch. Then-mayor Frank Ivancie fired Baker and removed the Police Bureau from Jordan's portfolio. The move sparked a protest, led by Ron Herndon. The Portland Internal Investigations Auditing Committee (PIIAC) was formed by City Council over the opposition of Mayor Frank Ivancie, who was closely tied with the Police Bureau, in response to the incident, in 1982. The police union organized a petition drive to bring the formation of the committee before voters, but voters approved the committee.

In 1984, Jordan resigned his council seat and became the director of parks and recreation for the city of Austin, Texas.

Jordan was succeeded as Commissioner by Dick Bogle, who was also African-American.

=== Portland Parks and Recreation ===
Jordan returned to Portland in 1989 as Director of Portland Parks & Recreation, and he would guide the department for 14 years. During Jordan's time at the parks department, Portland acquired 44 new recreational facilities.

In 2012, Portland honored Jordan by renaming University Park Community Center in Portland's Portsmouth neighborhood the Charles Jordan Community Center.
