= 2004 Oregon Ballot Measure 38 =

Ballot Measure 38 of 2004 would have abolished Oregon's State Accident Insurance Fund (commonly known as SAIF Corporation), a nonprofit state-chartered workers' compensation provider. SAIF's assets would have been sold and the revenues from the sale would have been used to fund schools and other state services. Voters defeated the measure in the 2 November 2004 general election, with 670,935 votes in favor, and 1,037,722 votes against. It was placed on the ballot by initiative petition by the political group Oregonians for Accountability.

Supporters of the measure pointed to a series of scandals at the government agency. They portrayed the agency as out-of-control and lacking proper oversight, and especially decried the agency's hiring of lobbyists to advocate on the agency's behalf. Measure 38 supporters capitalized on the fact that former governor Neil Goldschmidt, who admitted in 2004 to a sexual relationship with a 14-year-old girl in the 1970s, was one of the lobbyists. Later in the campaign, supporters ran ads portraying SAIF as a threat to gay rights, quoting a memo written by a former CEO in which she suggests the agency challenge the Oregon Court of Appeals decision in Tanner v. OHSU (157 Or.App. 502), which required public employers to extend domestic partner benefits to same-sex couples. Supporters also argued that abolishing the state-run insurer would lead to more competition and reduce rates.

Critics of the measure, which included the state's largest business lobby and the state chapters of the National Federation of Independent Business and the AFL-CIO, argued that SAIF is critical to keeping workers' compensation rates low. They also argued that Oregonians for Accountability was actually a front for Liberty Mutual, SAIF's major competitor for workers' compensation policies.

Results by county: No: 50–60%; 60–70%

== See also ==
- List of Oregon ballot measures
