= Gail Shibley =

American politician

Member of the Oregon House of Representatives from the 12th district
- In office 1991–1997
- Preceded by: Phil Keisling
- Succeeded by: Chris Beck

Personal details
- Born: 1957 or 1958 (age 68–69)
- Party: Democratic
- Spouse: Tiffany Harris

Gail R. Shibley (born c. 1958) is an American politician who was the first openly gay person to serve in the Oregon State Legislature.

She was appointed to the Oregon House of Representatives in January 1991, to fill a vacancy caused by Phil Keisling's resignation to serve as Oregon Secretary of State. She was elected to the seat in 1992 and re-elected in 1994. In 1996, she did not run for re-election, but instead ran for an for an open seat on the City Council of Portland. She was narrowly defeated by Jim Francesconi. Shibley subsequently moved to Germany, where she was an international liaison for the Saxony parliament, and then Washington, D.C., where she worked for the Federal Highway Administration, and was a senior advisor to the United States Secretary of Labor.

She subsequently returned to Oregon, working on Ted Kulongoski's campaign for Governor of Oregon in the 2002 gubernatorial election. She later served as the administrator of the Office of Environmental Public Health within the Oregon Health Authority. In December 2012, newly elected Portland Mayor Charlie Hales announced that Shibley would serve as his chief of staff when he assumed office in January 2013. She was described as having a "peer-to-peer" relationship with Hales, coming in as experienced chief of staff in recent times.

== Early life and education ==
Shibley was born in North Bend and raised in Albany, Oregon. She attended the University of Oregon and Lewis & Clark Law School.

== See also ==
- List of LGBT people from Portland, Oregon
