= 1988 Portland, Oregon, mayoral election =

- November 8, 1988
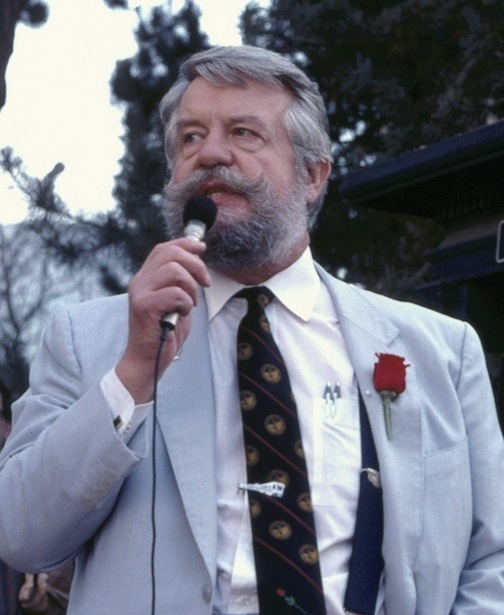

Nominee	Bud Clark	Ron Still	Lloyd Anderson
First-round vote	63,531	43,321	13,954
First-round percentage	49.39%	33.67%	10.84%
Second-round vote	115,603	81,724
Second-round percentage	58.46%	41.32%
Mayor before election
Bud Clark
Elected mayor
Bud Clark

On May 17, 1988 and November 8, 1988, elections were held in Portland, Oregon, to elect the mayor. Incumbent mayor Bud Clark won reelection, defeating former Portland Police Bureau chief Ron Still.

Portland uses a nonpartisan system for local elections, in which all voters are eligible to participate. All candidates are listed on the ballot without any political party affiliation.

All candidates meeting the qualifications competed in a blanket primary election on May 17, 1988. As no candidate received an absolute majority, the top two finishers advanced to a runoff in the November 8 general election.

== Candidates ==
- Lloyd Anderson, Executive director of the Port of Portland and former city commissioner
- Barry Bloom
- J.E. (Bud) Clark, incumbent mayor
- Jim Davis, former chief of the Portland Police Bureau
- William J. Doering
- Andrew G. Eggleston
- Robert Forthan
- Jeffrey Liddicoat
- Al Salazar
- Ron Still, former chief of the Portland Police Bureau
- Cliff Walker

== Results ==
=== Primary election ===
1988 Portland mayoral primary election
Party	Candidate	Votes	%
Nonpartisan	Bud Clark (incumbent)	63,531	49.39
Nonpartisan	Ron Still	43,321	33.67
Nonpartisan	Lloyd Anderson	13,954	10.84
Nonpartisan	Jim Davis	5,271	4.09
Nonpartisan	Al Salazar	619	0.48
Nonpartisan	Jeffrey Liddicoat	532	0.41
Nonpartisan	Barry Bloom	499	0.38
Nonpartisan	Cliff Walker	376	0.29
Nonpartisan	Andrew G. Eggleston	145	0.11
Nonpartisan	Robert Forthan	141	0.10
Nonpartisan	William J. Doering	129	0.10
Write-in		113	0.08
Total votes		128,631	100.00

=== General election ===
1988 Portland mayoral general election
Party	Candidate	Votes	%
Nonpartisan	Bud Clark (incumbent)	115,603	58.46
Nonpartisan	Ron Still	81,724	41.32
Write-in		420	0.21
Total votes		229,888	100.00
