= Lloyd Anderson (disambiguation) =

Lloyd Anderson may also refer to:

- Lloyd Anderson (1902–2000), American business executive
- Lloyd Anderson (politician) (1925–2017), American politician
- Lloyd Leo Anderson (1942–1965), American convicted murderer
