= Jim Spagg =

Artist, Free speech activist

James Spagnola (July 29, 1939 – May 8, 2004), known as Jim Spagg, was an American artist and host of a controversial public-access television program in Portland, Oregon, United States, from 1991 to 2003.

Spagg was born and raised in Cleveland, Ohio, and attended Catholic school.

== Public-access television program ==
In the early 1990s, Spagg attracted local and national media attention with Jim Spagg's Sex Show, a call-in cable TV program that contained uncensored nudity. Spagg, a nudist, produced and directed the program and frequently appeared without clothing. The show was mostly improvised and often consisted of little more than Spagg dancing nude while playing a guitar and singing. The show sometimes included nude guests and often contained footage filmed at Rooster Rock State Park, a clothing-optional public beach near Portland. Several episodes focused on Spagg's petty feuds with his neighbor Ed DeKota.

Spagg's stated premises were that nudity is not dirty and that people are too busy and too serious. He denied that his program was lewd, stating, "I am an artist and I'm expressing myself through video."

The program also featured profanity and footage of Spagg defecating.

=== Removal from the air ===
In May 2003, after nearly 11 years on the air, Jim Spagg's Sex Show was removed by Portland Cable Access (PCA) after Spagg defecated live on the show. He was suspended for a year; the official reason given was the broadcast of copyrighted material, which violated the public-access channel's broadcast standards. The material in question consisted of clips filmed by PCA featuring on-the-street testimony about the organisation.

PCA executive director Carl Kucharski said, "He simply took property and used it as his own, against our rules and federal law."

== Public reaction and media attention ==
The Portland-area public often found Spagg's public-access show while flipping through cable TV channels. His show elicited complaints from viewers, particularly those with children, who were upset that his program ran during the day. Despite public calls for the program's removal from PCA, it remained on the air because of freedom-of-speech protections for public-access programming. Spagg frequently defended his program as art, and appeared on KATU's Town Hall program, where he defended his right to appear nude on television as freedom of speech. He was also featured on the national television news show A Current Affair.

Jim Spagg died of leukemia on May 8, 2004, at the age of 64 in Portland. At the time, he was running for mayor of the city. He received several hundred votes.
