= Bob Koch =

American politician

Portland City Commissioner
- In office 1987–1990
- Preceded by: Margaret Strachan
- Succeeded by: Gretchen Kafoury

Personal details
- Occupation: City Commissioner

Bob Koch is an American politician from Oregon who served as a member of the Portland City Commission for one term from 1987 to 1990. Before serving as a City Commissioner, Koch worked for the Portland Police Bureau.

Koch is most notable for his attempt to ban the use of styrofoam in Portland restaurants. Koch eventually abandoned the proposal but it was reintroduced by Commissioner Earl Blumenauer and was put into effect on January 1, 1990.
