= State Accident Insurance Fund =

Not-for-profit in Oregon, United States

State Accident Insurance Fund Corporation
- Type: Public Corporation
- Industry: Insurance company
- Founded: 1914
- Headquarters: Oregon
- Key people: Chip Terhune (President, CEO) 2021

The State Accident Insurance Fund Corporation (SAIF) is a not-for-profit, state-chartered workers’ compensation insurance company in the U.S. state of Oregon. It provides workers' compensation insurance and workplace safety services for Oregon employers, and claim management for injured workers. It is based in Salem, Oregon.

== History ==
SAIF was created in 1914 by the Oregon Legislative Assembly as a state agency, and in 1980 became the United States' first public corporation specializing in workers' compensation insurance. A board of directors, appointed by the governor, oversees the company's operations. Chip Terhune was selected as president and chief executive officer of SAIF in 2021.

SAIF does not pay state income tax, which gives it the ability to price its policies competitively. Private competitor Liberty Northwest, a subsidiary of Liberty Mutual, has been openly critical of the laws regulating SAIF for some time.

In 2004, voters rejected a ballot measure that would have abolished SAIF. The measure was defeated with 61 percent of the vote.

In 2005, SAIF was investigated for allegedly failing to provide documents to a nonprofit group, specifically regarding a lobbying contract with former Governor Neil Goldschmidt. The investigation determined that SAIF had done nothing wrong. SAIF issued a report on its status to Governor Ted Kulongoski in early 2005.

In 2007, SAIF began an internally designed and run wellness program that, as of 2017, had a 99% participation rate among employees. The company discounts the health insurance premiums and deductible of employees if employees engage in the program.

In 2009, the Oregon legislature passed a bill, sponsored by SAIF in collaboration with Liberty Northwest and other peers, to amend the means of accessing SAIF's records.

In 2014, former president and CEO John Plotkin sued SAIF over his termination by the board earlier that year. The case was settled in January 2017.

SAIF's board of directors has declared a dividend for policyholders every year since 2010, returning a total of more than $1.6 billion to its Oregon customers.

More than 54,000 Oregon employers are insured by SAIF. The company employs more than 1,000 people in six offices around the state.

Due in part to workplace safety efforts, Oregon's pure premium rate for workers' compensation insurance either declined or stayed the same for 28 of the past 30 years.

In February 2025, it was reported that a gunman shot up the home of CEO Chip Terhune in Lake Oswego, Oregon. Terhune later mentioned the incident via a company-wide email where he indicated that he had received a threatening email and urged that all employees be vigilant and aware of their surroundings.
