= John M. Breck =

American politician

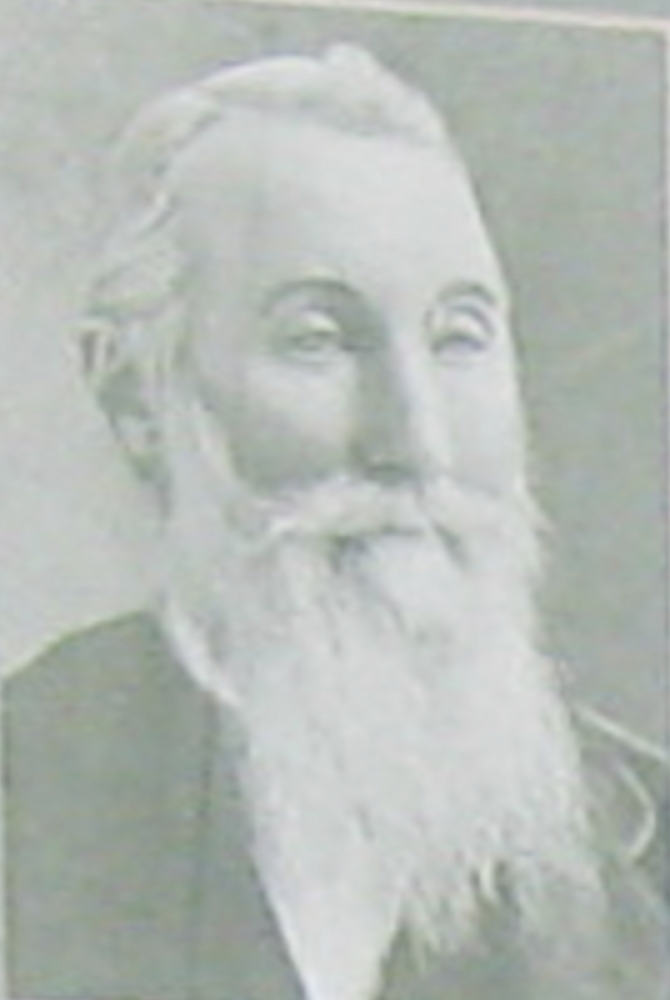

12th Mayor of Portland, Oregon
- In office 1861–1862
- Preceded by: G. Collier Robbins
- Succeeded by: William H. Farrar

Personal details
- Born: April 9, 1828 Berks County, Pennsylvania, U.S.
- Died: February 21, 1900 (aged 71) Portland, Oregon, U.S.
- Party: Republican
- Profession: Businessman

John Malcolm Breck (April 9, 1828 – February 21, 1900) was a businessman in Portland, Oregon, United States, who served as mayor of Portland from 1861 to 1862.

Breck was born in Berks County, Pennsylvania, in 1828. At the age of sixteen, he left Pennsylvania for Wisconsin. In 1850, he left Wisconsin for Oregon aboard the vessel Columbia. He served as purser for the voyage. In 1857 and 1858, Breck was elected Assessor of Portland.

He was elected mayor of Portland on April 1, 1861. He was succeeded as mayor by William H. Farrar in 1862. He served as a Portland city councilman in 1868–70 and as City Assessor again in 1872—73.

Breck died at his home in Portland on February 21, 1900.

Preceded by G. Collier Robbins	Mayor of Portland, Oregon; 1861–1862	Succeeded by William H. Farrar
