= Jim Francesconi =

American lawyer and politician (born 1953)

- Francesconi in 2011

Portland City Commissioner
- In office January 1, 1997 – December 31, 2004
- Preceded by: Mike Lindberg
- Succeeded by: Sam Adams

Personal details
- Born: 1953 (age 72–73)

Jim Francesconi (born 1953) is an American lawyer and politician who served on the Portland, Oregon City Council from 1997 until 2004. In 2004 he raised $1.3 million in his bid for mayor of Portland, more than doubling the previous fund-raising record for the position of $600,000, set by Earl Blumenauer in 1992. Francesconi lost the election to Tom Potter, a former police chief who placed strict limits on contributions to his own campaign ($25 in the primary election, $100 in the general election), and who ultimately spent less than a tenth of what Francesconi did on the campaign.

== Career ==
Francesconi was elected city commissioner in 1996. In the primary election, he finished with 27.05% of the vote, advancing to the general election against Gail Shibley. He won in the general with 53% of the vote. Francesconi was re-elected in 2000, unopposed. In 2004, he ran for mayor of Portland, raising an unprecedented $1 million for the primary election. He finished second in the primary election, and lost to Tom Potter in the general election, receiving 38% of votes to Potter's 61%. In 2011, The Oregonian described Francesconi's mayoral campaign as "the worst big-time campaign in modern Portland history." Francesconi said, "I look back on that campaign, and I'm embarrassed. I let myself be painted as the insider. I let myself become the insider."

In 2006, after leaving Portland City Council, Francesconi, who had previously served as Portland's commissioner of Portland Parks & Recreation, the city's parks department, joined the law firm Haglund, Kelley, Horngren & Jones. One of his clients in that position was Warner Pacific College, which he represented in its bid to purchase a nine-acre parcel of city property adjoining its campus. The parcel is adjoined to Mount Tabor Park, and serves as the maintenance facility for the city's parks system. The deal fell through when the local neighborhood association learned about the negotiations.

In spring 2011, Francesconi considered a comeback bid for the 2012 Portland, Oregon mayoral election. He ultimately did not enter the race.

In 2014, Francesconi ran for Multnomah county chair. He lost to Deborah Kafoury in the primary election.
