= 2004 Portland, Oregon, mayoral election =

- November 2, 2004
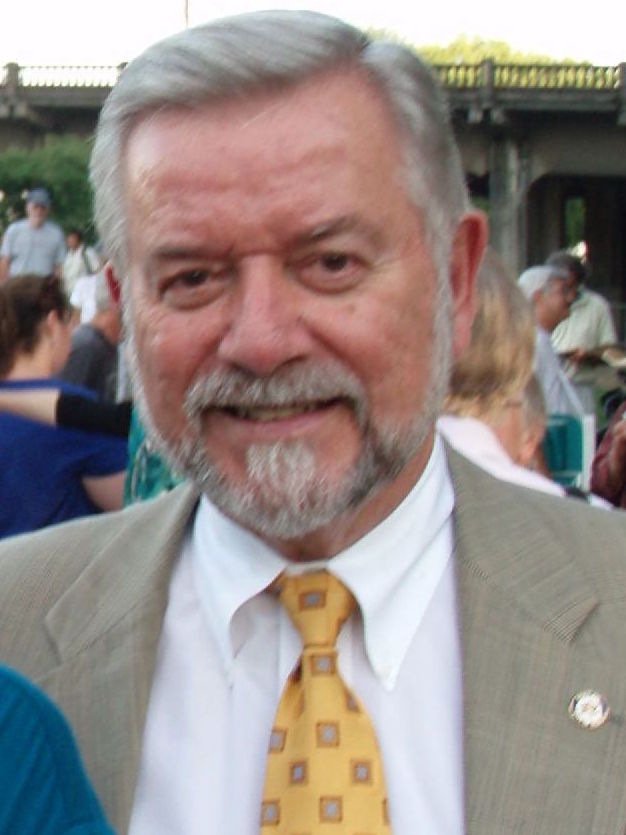

Nominee	Tom Potter	Jim Francesconi	Phil Busse
First-round vote	56,530	45,970	9,870
First-round percentage	42.25%	34.36%	7.38%
Second-round vote	168,377	105,017
Second-round percentage	61.01%	38.05%
Nominee	James L. Posey
First-round vote	6,914
First-round percentage	5.17%
Mayor before election
Vera Katz
Elected mayor
Tom Potter

On November 2, 2004, an election was held in Portland, Oregon, to elect the mayor. Tom Potter was elected, defeating Jim Francesconi. Incumbent mayor Vera Katz did not seek a fourth term.

Portland uses a nonpartisan system for local elections, in which all voters are eligible to participate. All candidates are listed on the ballot without any political-party affiliation.

All candidates meeting the qualifications competed in a blanket primary election on May 18, 2004. As no candidate received an absolute majority, the top two finishers advanced to a runoff in the November 6 general election.

== Candidates ==
- David "The Ack" Ackerman, photographer and The Oregonian mailer
- R. Jerry Adams, executive director
- Lori Balkema, U.S. Bank floor coordinator
- Michael Benkoski, journalist
- Phil Busse, writer
- Scot "Extremo the Clown" Campbell, artist and entertainer
- Jim Francesconi, Portland city commissioner
- Craig Gier, engineer
- Bart Hanson, independent contractor
- Robert Ted Hinds, market research analyst
- Bruce W. Hollen, small business owner
- Lew Humble, retired mechanic
- Scott Ketchum, truck driver
- Rosalinda S. Mitchell, writer
- Peter Nilsson, maintenance and research coordinator
- Donald J. Pfau, retired efficiency analyst
- James L. Posey, business owner
- Tom Potter, consultant
- Jeffrey C. Rempfer, advertising and public-relations executive
- Rozz Rezabek-Wright, artist, writer, and construction worker
- Jim Spagnola, retired Social Security worker and former public-access-show host
- Brad Taylor, homeless outreach coordinator
- Jeff R. Taylor, broker and property developer

== Primary election results ==
Portland mayoral primary election, 2004
Party	Candidate	Votes	%
Nonpartisan	Tom Potter	56,530	42.25
Nonpartisan	Jim Francesconi	45,970	34.36
Nonpartisan	Phil Busse	9,870	7.38
Nonpartisan	James L. Posey	6,914	5.17
Nonpartisan	Jeff R. Taylor	3,164	2.36
Nonpartisan	R. Jerry Adams	1,897	1.42
Nonpartisan	Jeffrey C. Rempfer	1,716	1.28
Nonpartisan	Scot Campbell	1,295	0.97
Nonpartisan	Brad Taylor	1,013	0.76
Nonpartisan	Bart Hanson	857	0.64
Nonpartisan	Robert Ted Hinds	839	0.63
Nonpartisan	Jim Spagnola	693	0.52
Nonpartisan	Lori Balkema	553	0.41
Nonpartisan	Rosalinda S. Mitchell	489	0.37
Nonpartisan	Scott Ketchum	247	0.18
Nonpartisan	David Ackerman	244	0.18
Nonpartisan	Peter Nilsson	212	0.16
Nonpartisan	Rozz Rezabek-Wright	205	0.15
Nonpartisan	Michael Benkoski	159	0.12
Nonpartisan	Lew Humble	124	0.09
Nonpartisan	Craig Gier	108	0.08
Nonpartisan	Donald J. Pfau	93	0.07
Nonpartisan	Bruce W. Hollen	67	0.05
Write-in		545	0.41
Total votes		133,804	100.00

== General election results ==
Portland mayoral general election, 2004
Party	Candidate	Votes	%
Nonpartisan	Tom Potter	168,377	61.01
Nonpartisan	Jim Francesconi	105,017	38.05
Write-in		2,591	0.94
Total votes		275,985	100.00
