= 1996 Portland, Oregon, mayoral election =

- May 21, 1996
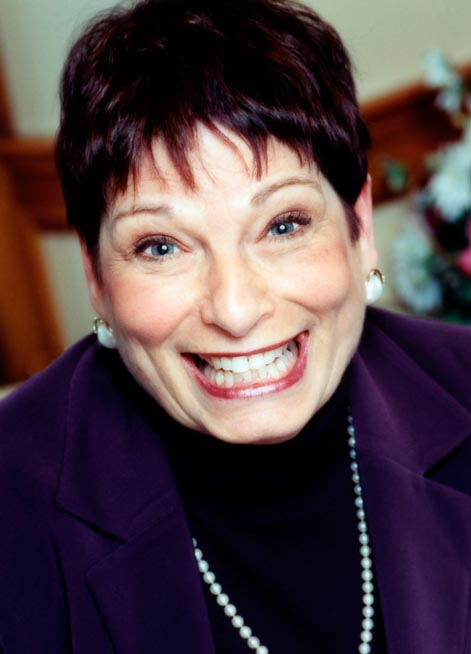

Nominee	Vera Katz	Bill Spidal
Popular vote	76,915	5,926
Percentage	74.47%	5.73%
Mayor before election
Vera Katz
Elected mayor
Vera Katz

On May 21, 1996, an election was held in Portland, Oregon, to elect the mayor. Incumbent mayor Vera Katz was re-elected.

Portland uses a nonpartisan system for local elections, in which all voters are eligible to participate. All candidates are listed on the ballot without any political party affiliation.

All candidates meeting the qualifications competed in a blanket primary election on May 21, 1996. Because Katz received a majority of the vote in the initial round, no runoff election was necessary.

== Results ==
Results
Party	Candidate	Votes	%
Nonpartisan	Vera Katz (incumbent)	76,915	74.47
Nonpartisan	Bill Spidal	5,926	5.73
Nonpartisan	Tom Cropper	3,800	3.68
Nonpartisan	Michael Beaudin	2,921	2.82
Nonpartisan	Robert L. Forthan	1,087	1.05
Nonpartisan	Paul H. Shene III	801	0.77
Write-in		961	0.93
Total votes		103,273	
