= William H. Farrar =

American politician

13th Mayor of Portland, Oregon
- In office 1862–1863
- Preceded by: John M. Breck
- Succeeded by: David Logan

United States Attorney for Oregon Territory
- In office November 1854 – 1859
- Appointed by: Franklin Pierce

Delegate to the Oregon Constitutional Convention
- In office 1857
- Constituency: Multnomah County

Personal details
- Born: William Humphrey Farrar; 1826 New Hampshire, United States
- Died: November 21, 1873 (aged 46–47) Washington, D.C., United States

William Humphrey Farrar (November 20, 1828 – November 21, 1873) was an American lawyer and politician from Oregon. He was United States Attorney for Oregon Territory from 1854 to 1859, and was elected mayor of Portland, Oregon, in 1862.

In 1857, he was a delegate to the Oregon Constitutional Convention representing Multnomah County. He voted against approving the Constitution.

He was elected in 1862 as the mayor of Portland, Oregon. He died on November 21, 1873, in Washington, D.C. He has been described as the "Worst Mayor Ever" of Portland. At the beginning of his term, he informed the city council he had to take a three-month leave of absence for business. He was never seen in Portland again.

| Preceded by John M. Breck | Mayor of Portland, Oregon; 1862–1863 | Succeeded by David Logan |
