= G. Collier Robbins =

American politician

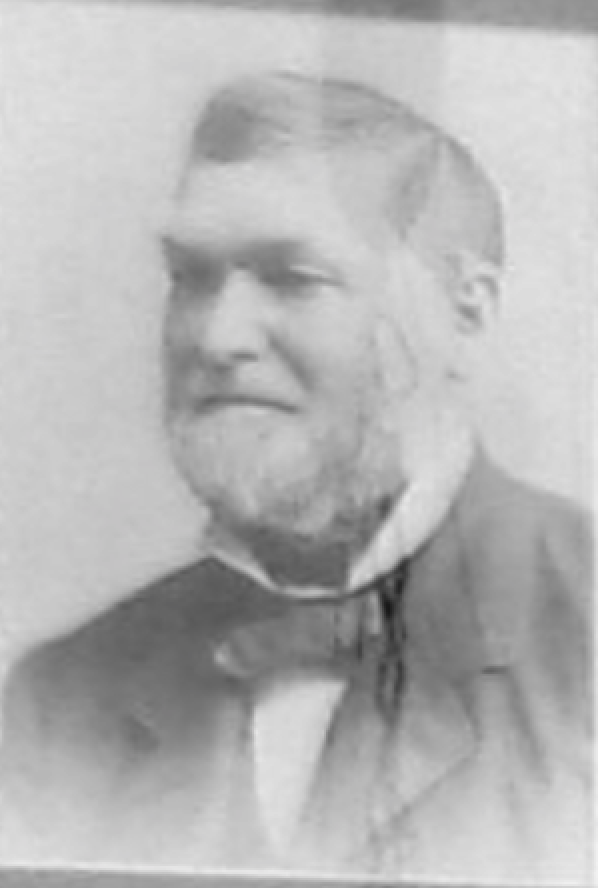

11th Mayor of Portland, Oregon
- In office 1860–1861
- Preceded by: S. J. McCormick
- Succeeded by: John M. Breck

Personal details
- Born: September 1, 1823
- Died: c. 1907–1908 (aged 83–85)
- Profession: Jeweler, watchmaker

George Collier Robbins (September 1, 1823 – c. 1907-1908) served as mayor of Portland, Oregon, from 1860 to 1861. During his early life he lived and worked in various places, including Iowa, Ohio, Michigan, and St. Louis, Missouri. He entered the jewelry business in St. Louis. With his wife he began journeying west to California in 1851, reaching the state in April 1852. Later the same year, they moved northward by steamship to Oregon, reaching Portland in October 1852, where they settled. He opened a watch and jewelry store on Front Street, later adding assaying to his business.

Robbins was elected mayor of Portland in April 1860. His term ended in 1861, and in 1862 he moved to California, and was still living there, in San Diego, in October 1907. He died sometime between then and mid-1908.

Preceded by S. J. McCormick	Mayor of Portland, Oregon; 1860–1861	Succeeded by John M. Breck
