= David Logan (Oregon politician) =

American politician

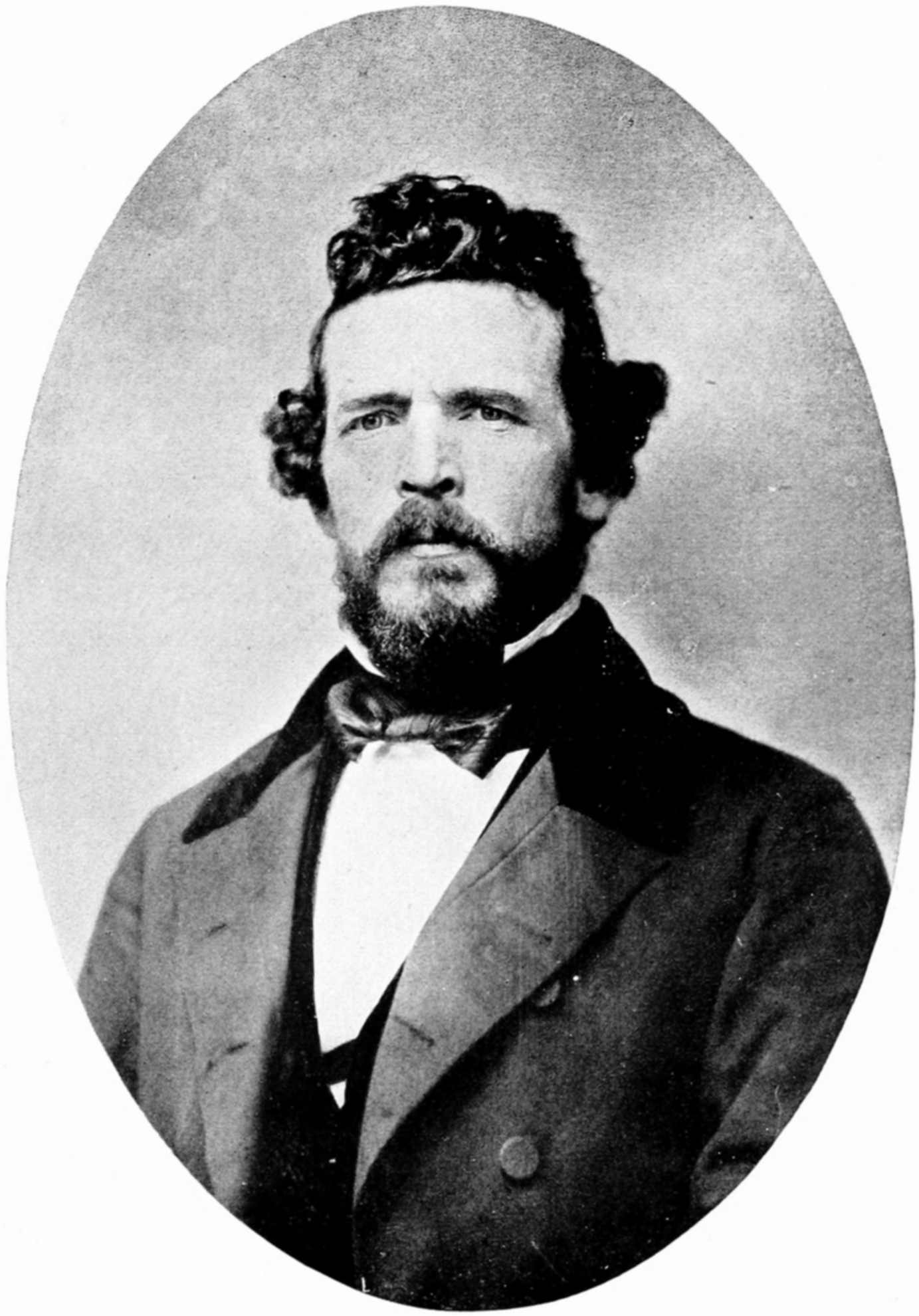

14th Mayor of Portland, Oregon
- In office 1863–1864
- Preceded by: William H. Farrar
- Succeeded by: Henry Failing

Member of the Oregon Territorial Legislature
- In office 1854–1854
- Constituency: Washington County

Member of the Oregon Constitutional Convention
- In office 1857–1857
- Constituency: Multnomah County

Personal details
- Born: April 5, 1824 Kentucky, U.S.
- Died: March 26, 1874 (aged 49) Yamhill County, Oregon, U.S.
- Party: Republican
- Spouse: Mary Porter Waldo
- Relations: Stephen T. Logan

David Logan (April 5, 1824 – March 26, 1874) was an American attorney and politician in the territory of and later state of Oregon. A native of Illinois, he moved to Oregon in 1850 where he served in the Oregon Territorial Legislature and in the Oregon Constitutional Convention. A founder of the Oregon Republican Party, he also served as mayor of Portland.

== Early life ==
David Logan was born in the state of Kentucky on April 5, 1824. The family later moved to the town of Springfield, Illinois. His father, Stephen T. Logan, practiced law as a partner with Abraham Lincoln in Springfield. David Logan studied law in Springfield under his father and Lincoln passing the bar in 1844 in Sangamon County. An anti-Democrat and Whig politically, Logan was to become a partner with Lincoln and his father in their practice before his drinking led to a falling out with his father. Due to this falling out, Logan's father sent him to join the army and fight in the Mexican–American War. David Logan also briefly moved to California. After Logan returned from the war, his father sent him to Oregon.

In 1850, Logan arrived in what was then the Oregon Territory and set up a law practice in Lafayette. He moved to Portland soon after and continued practicing law. The next year he ran for representative office in the Oregon Territorial Legislature for Yamhill County, but lost to Matthew P. Deady. Logan and Deady would have a long-running feud, Logan's drunkenness would continue to plague him, and further troubles included accusations of the rape of a Native American girl. On January 20, 1852, he represented the United States in a customs dispute with the Hudson's Bay Company at a court in Olympia, which was still part of the Oregon Territory at that time.

== Political career ==
In June 1854, Logan was elected to the Oregon Territorial Legislature to represent Washington County, which at that time included Portland and part of what later that year became Multnomah County. In 1857, he was elected to represent Multnomah County at the Oregon Constitutional Convention, held from August to September in Salem. Logan was on the Judicial Department Committee. He voted against the adoption of the Oregon Constitution, but it was approved. He also helped found the Oregon Republican Party.

In 1858, Logan was the new Republican Party's candidate for the first full term in the state's seat in the United States House of Representatives. He lost to Democrat Lansing Stout in a very close race (50.07% to 49.93%). He was again the candidate in 1860, and lost to Democrat George Shiel in another very close rece (50.29% to 49.71%).

Logan was elected as the Mayor of Portland on April 6, 1863, and served until April 1864. In 1868, he ran for US Representative a third time, losing to Joseph Showalter Smith.

== Later years ==
In 1862, he married Mary Porter Waldo; they had no children. Logan entered a partnership with Erasmus D. Shattuck in 1857, and remained a partner until 1874. In 1871, he partly retired to a farm in Yamhill County. On March 26, 1874, David Logan died in Yamhill County at the age of 49. He was called the "greatest jury lawyer of his time".

| Preceded by William H. Farrar | Mayor of Portland, Oregon; 1863–1864 | Succeeded by Henry Failing |
