= Piccolo Park =

Public park in Portland, Oregon, U.S.

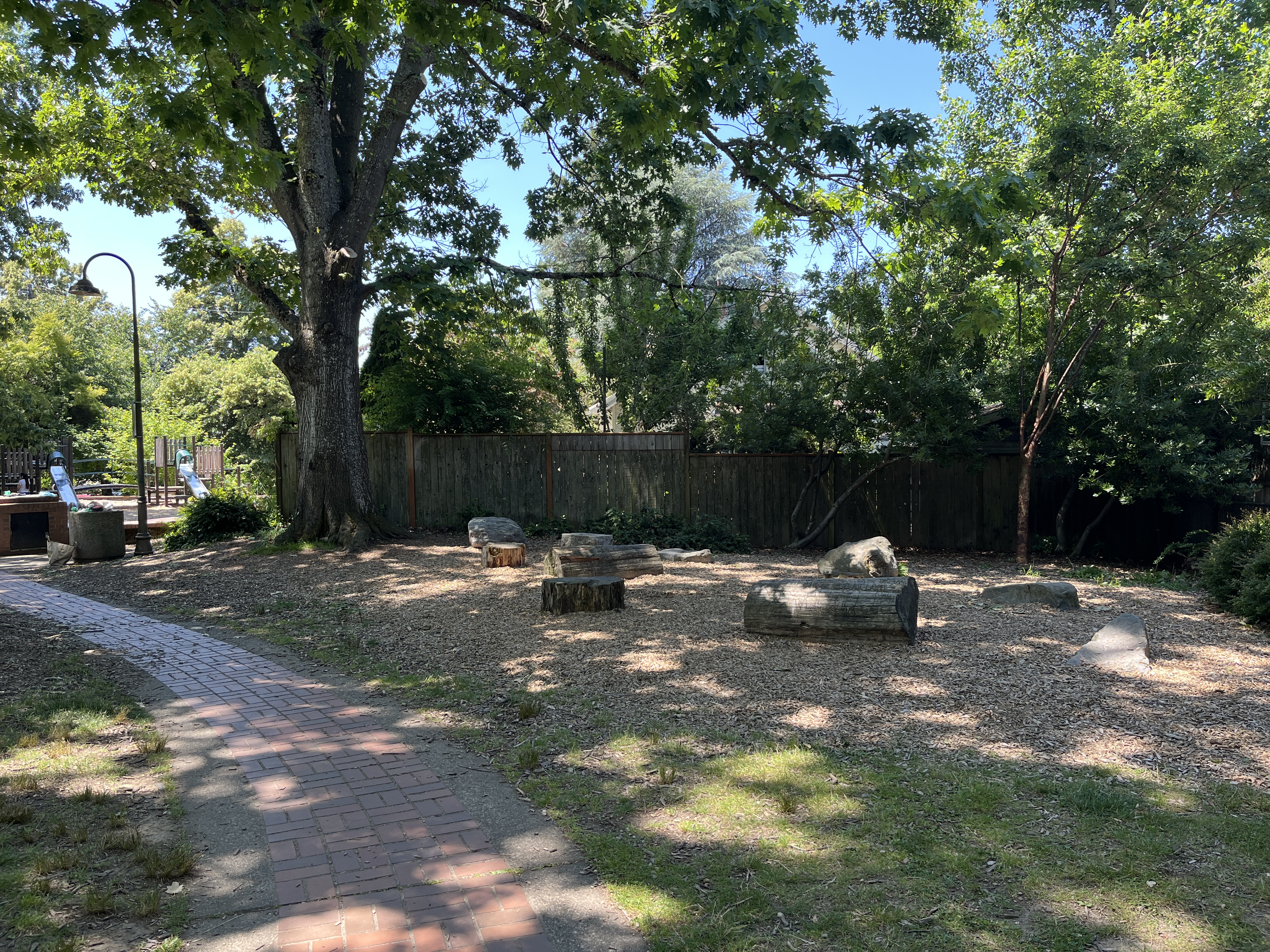
- Part of the park in 2026

- Location within Portland, Oregon
- Location: SE 27th Ave. and Division St. Portland, Oregon
- Coordinates: 45°30′14″N 122°38′16″W
- Area: 0.57 acres (0.23 ha)
- Operator: Portland Parks & Recreation

Piccolo Park is a .57-acre (0.23 ha) public park in Portland, Oregon's Hosford-Abernethy neighborhood, in the United States. The space was acquired in 1989. The park sits on land acquired for the never-built Mount Hood Freeway.
