= Mount Hood Freeway =

Cancelled freeway in Portland, Oregon

Mount Hood Freeway
- Proposed Mount Hood Freeway corridor highlighted in red

Route information
- Length: 6 mi (9.7 km)
- History: Canceled in 1974

Major junctions
- West end: I-5 / US 26 in Portland
- I-80N / I-205 in Portland
- East end: US 26 in Sandy

Location
- Country: United States
- State: Oregon

Highway system
- Oregon Highways; Interstate; US; State; Named; Scenic

The Mount Hood Freeway is a partially constructed but never to be completed freeway alignment of U.S. Route 26 and Interstate 80N (now Interstate 84), which would have run through southeast Portland, Oregon. Related projects would have continued the route through the neighboring suburb of Gresham, out to the city of Sandy.

The original plans for the freeway were presented by the Oregon State Highway Department as part of a 1955 report that proposed 14 new highways in the Portland metropolitan area. The freeway proposal was part of urban planner Robert Moses’s original postwar infrastructure plan for Portland.

The proposed route was to run parallel to the existing alignment of US 26 on Powell Boulevard, and would have required the destruction of 1,750 long-standing Portland homes and one percent of the Portland housing stock. Plans for the freeway triggered a revolt in Portland in the late 1960s and early 1970s, leading to its eventual cancellation. Plans for other proposed freeways in Portland were also scrapped, including Interstate 505. Funds for the project (and other canceled freeways) were spent on other transportation projects, including the first section of the MAX Light Rail system.

When the freeway was canceled, a segment was already completed southeastwards from East Burnside Road and Southeast Powell Blvd in Gresham, continuing to Sandy, which remains in use today.

== Alignment ==
The freeway would have run from the Willamette River (at the Marquam Bridge) to about SE 50th Avenue adjacent to the south side of Division St. It would then have shifted to Powell Blvd. (Route 26) near SE 54th Avenue. By the initial plan, the freeway would have ended at SE 122nd Avenue, though extensions were considered.

In 1962, this section was formally submitted for inclusion in the U.S. Interstate Highway System as part of Interstate 80N, today's I-84.

I-205 was in the planning stages at the time the Mount Hood Freeway was first proposed. The I-205 routing was originally envisioned for the 52nd Avenue corridor, but ended up being built farther east at about 93rd Avenue. All plans for the Mount Hood Freeway allowed for a future I-205 connection at various spots.

Another segment of the proposal was called the Mount Hood Expressway. It would have continued the Mount Hood Freeway alignment past a stack interchange at I-205, continuing to follow Powell Blvd. before skirting Gresham to the south and connecting to the existing route.

The final segment of the proposal continued southeast from Gresham and ran to the outskirts of Sandy. This section was actually constructed (and is an expressway-grade highway), with a single interchange at the junction with Oregon Route 212.

=== Route designations ===
The new highway would have carried US 26 along the entire alignment, while I-80N was to be re-routed along the portion between I-5 and I-205. The I-80N designation would have been removed from the Banfield Freeway, and the route would be duplexed over I-205 between the segments. US 26 would be taken off Powell Blvd, the Ross Island Bridge, and downtown Portland streets, continuing on I-5 and I-405 to the Sunset Highway. The Banfield Freeway section would have been taken out of the Interstate system and signed only as U.S. Route 30.

== Revolt and aftermath ==
By the time planners began to think seriously about building the Mount Hood Freeway in the 1970s, the neighborhoods in and near its path mobilized grass-roots efforts against the freeway. The movements gained citywide and local support which changed the political landscape in local elections. Soon, it seemed as if the Federal government and some in the Oregon State Highway Department (now the Oregon Department of Transportation) were the only ones who wanted the freeway.

The freeway's promoted virtue of a speedy commute was debunked by the freeway's opponents. On one hand, it was seen as benefiting only suburban Gresham and East Multnomah County at the expense of Portland's neighborhoods. On the other hand, many opponents stated that the freeway would be obsolete the minute it opened, jamming with traffic volumes that the freeway was not designed for.

Efforts to make the freeway more acceptable made their way into the later proposals. Among the proposals were increased landscaping and bike paths along the route as well as parks and community centers built over the freeway's "air rights" and a "transitway" with three-level stations (separate levels for local buses and express buses) for an express busway. These efforts, however, were not enough to sell the project.

Approval for the Mount Hood Freeway was withdrawn by the Multnomah County Board of Commissioners on February 21, 1974, which was followed by a similar action from the Portland City Council in late July. After the project's cancellation, local transportation planners began to look at completing I-205. Disputes with the new freeway-adverse Multnomah County Commission had left a 9-mile (14 km) gap between the two completed sections. I-205 ended in the south just across the Clackamas County line and stopped at the Columbia River in the north. After the successful battle over the Mount Hood, activists were pushing for I-205's cancellation, while some neighborhoods and businesses wanted it further east or west (depending on the proposal).

After some negotiation, I-205's Multnomah County segment was finalized, reducing interchanges, eliminating a possible provision for a Mount Hood Freeway interchange, and resulting in the alignment of today's I-205. An unfinished, grade-separated transitway and a bike path were added to I-205, part of the Mount Hood Freeway ideas that actually influenced another freeway. The transitway is now being used as the route for the TriMet MAX Red Line and the MAX Green Line.

Since the completion of I-205, no major freeways have been built in the Portland metropolitan area.

A total of 415 parcels in the future path of the Mount Hood Freeway were acquired by the state government, costing $7.8 million in 1975. They were gradually resold for re-integration after the proposal was defeated.

Some believe the Mount Hood Freeway is one of the things most recognizable as a reason for the development and promotion of alternative forms of transportation in Portland. The MAX light rail system, the Portland Transit Mall, and the city's notable bicycle-friendly policies are said by some Portlanders to have stemmed from the freeway revolt.

== Remnants ==
Only a few physical signs remain of the canceled freeway, mostly in the form of incomplete connecting ramps or ramp stubs. Some previous evidence of the Mount Hood Freeway has been eliminated by new roadwork.

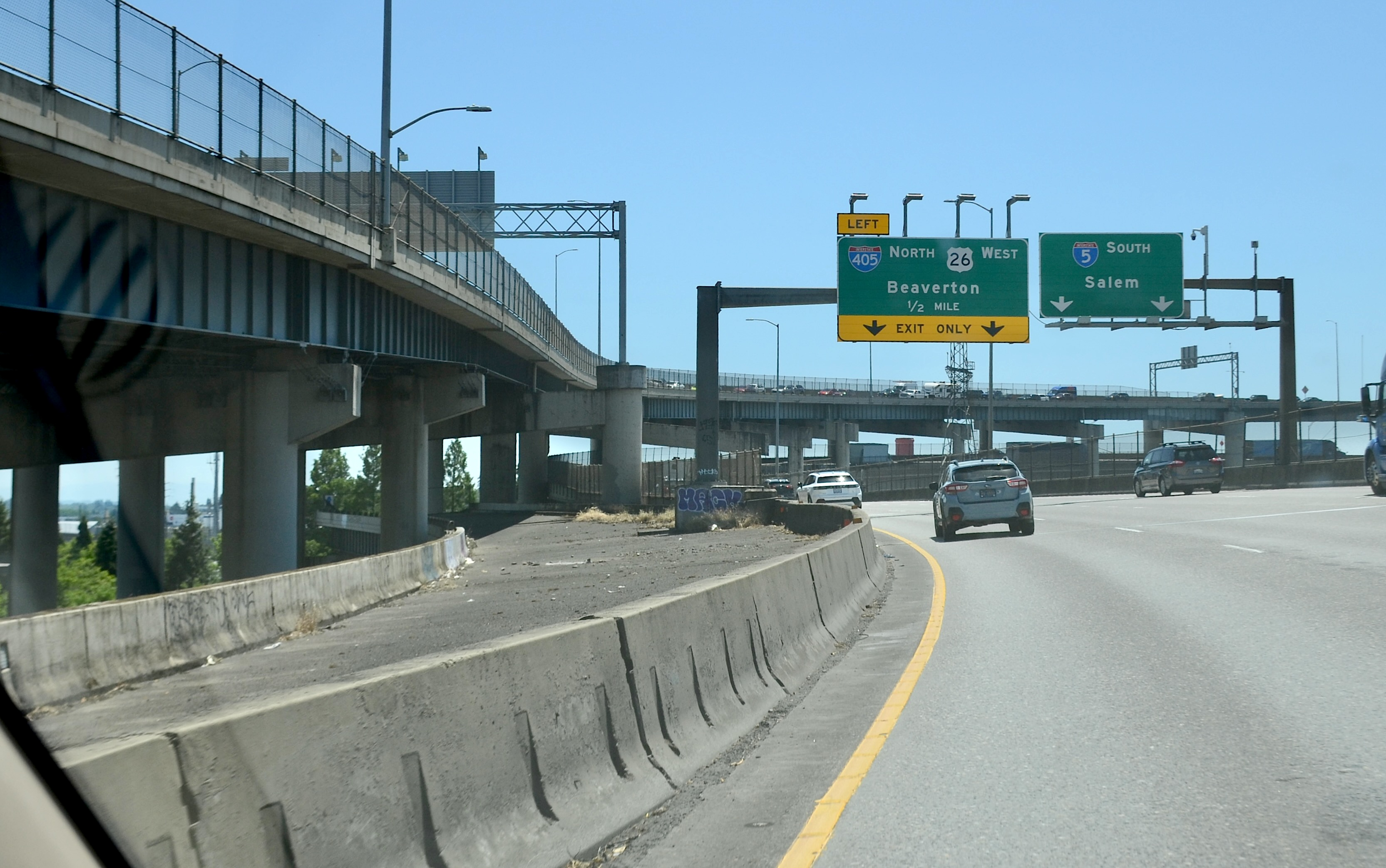
Stub on the Marquam Bridge for a once-planned junction with a connecting ramp from I-5 southbound to the Mount Hood Freeway, still in place in 2025

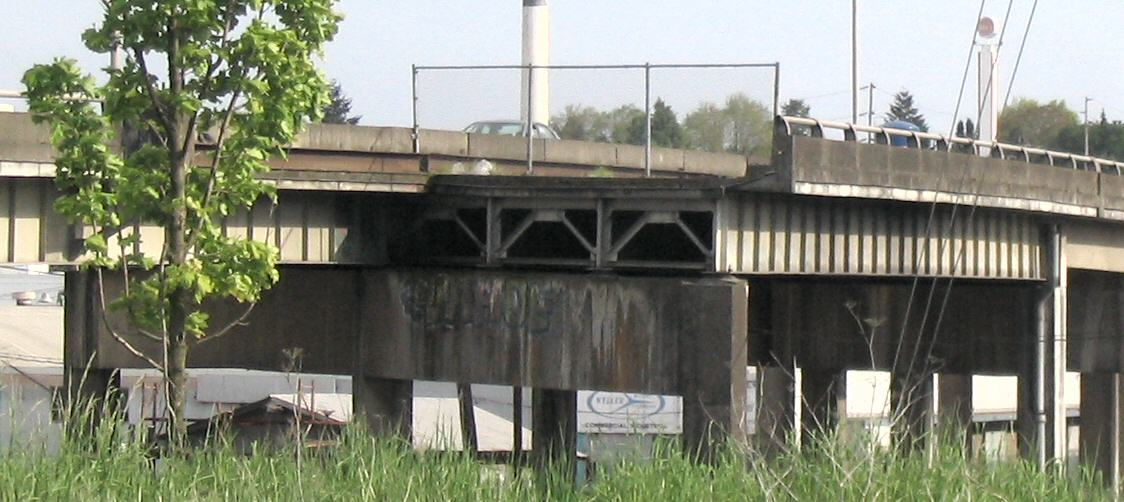
The defunct Grand Avenue leg of the Union Avenue (MLK Jr. Blvd) Viaduct, built in the 1960s

- Interchange grading: At the western end of Segment Three, the highway was graded to support an interchange with the proposed Segment Two. An unusual divided sweeping turn on US 26 past Gresham is visible where an interchange with an unbuilt segment would have been.
- Ramp from I-5 southbound: Just as the southbound lanes enter the lower level of the approach to the Marquam Bridge, a left exit (which would have been 300A) is blocked off, complete with an empty sign bridge (replaced in 2015). This would have been the southbound I-5 access to the Mount Hood Freeway eastbound. Places to attach similar ramps were built for other directions of travel on I-5, but they were instead used to widen the freeway in 1990 (and reconstruction of the ramp from I-5 northbound to I-84). There is a bridge support that is wider than needed to support the existing lanes of I-5.
- Marquam Bridge configuration: On the lower deck (southbound), the ramp to I-405 exits in the left lanes, not the right. This was because the Mount Hood Freeway ramps were to come onto the bridge on the same side before the span, so lane changes would be unnecessary to continue on US 26 (it was to be duplexed with I-405). The same applies for the upper deck for the right lanes.
- Grand Avenue Viaduct: A ramp stub on the bridge over the railroad tracks was intended as a connection to either I-5 or the Mount Hood Freeway. With the MLK viaduct project of 2007–2011, this ramp stub has been removed.
- I-84 exit numbering: I-84, which replaced I-80N, has a strange numbering pattern near its junction with I-205, indicating that its Banfield Freeway portion was originally considered to be temporary. Specifically, there is about 1.5 miles (2.4 km) between exits 5 and 9, and mileposts along the Banfield Freeway jump between Mile 7 and Mile 10. The current exit numbers are different from original numbers on the Banfield, which were based on the actual mileposts; for example, what is exit 1 eastbound was originally exit 2A, and what is exit 9 was exit 6. This original exit numbering scheme also points to the temporary routing of I-84 on the Banfield.
- I-84/I-205 junction configuration: As one approaches the interchange on I-84 from the east, one uses an exit off the freeway alignment to access the Banfield Freeway (continuing on I-84), whereas one stays on the mainline to access I-205. Also, as one approaches from the west, the Banfield Freeway's lanes merge on the right of lanes that come from I-205.
- I-405 signage: At I-405's northern terminus, one keeps left to follow US 30 exiting on I-5 and eventually I-84. The overhead signs marking this exit, however, only mention "US 30 East/The Dalles" without any mention of I-84 (however, auxiliary signs do say "I-5 South/I-84/East Next Left"). While the original sign has been replaced, the information on the sign is the same as when the Fremont Bridge opened in 1973, when the Mount Hood Freeway was still planned to be I-80N's Portland routing. (As a side note, I-405's northern interchange with I-5 contains many ramp stubs and truncated ramps of another scrapped Portland freeway, the Rose City Freeway.)
- Piccolo Park: This small park sits on land that was acquired for the freeway.
- Along Powell Blvd, on the south side of the street is a series of linear parking lots and skinny buildings that have been built in the last 25 years on land that was acquired for the freeway.
- Exit 19 southbound on I-205: The approach to the Division/Powell exit, exit 19, has been curbed in an odd way, as if it were to have been a splitting of a duplexed I-84/I-205 into separate freeways; it is now an unusually wide exit. After leaving I-205 the exit splits again, sending Powell-bound traffic beneath a wide Division Street underpass and non-stop to a westbound-only turn onto Powell. This was to be the continuation of westbound I-84 as it merged with the Mount Hood Expressway.

== See also ==
- Neil Goldschmidt
- MAX Blue Line
- MAX Yellow Line
