= Charles Jordan Community Center =

Community center in Portland, Oregon, U.S.

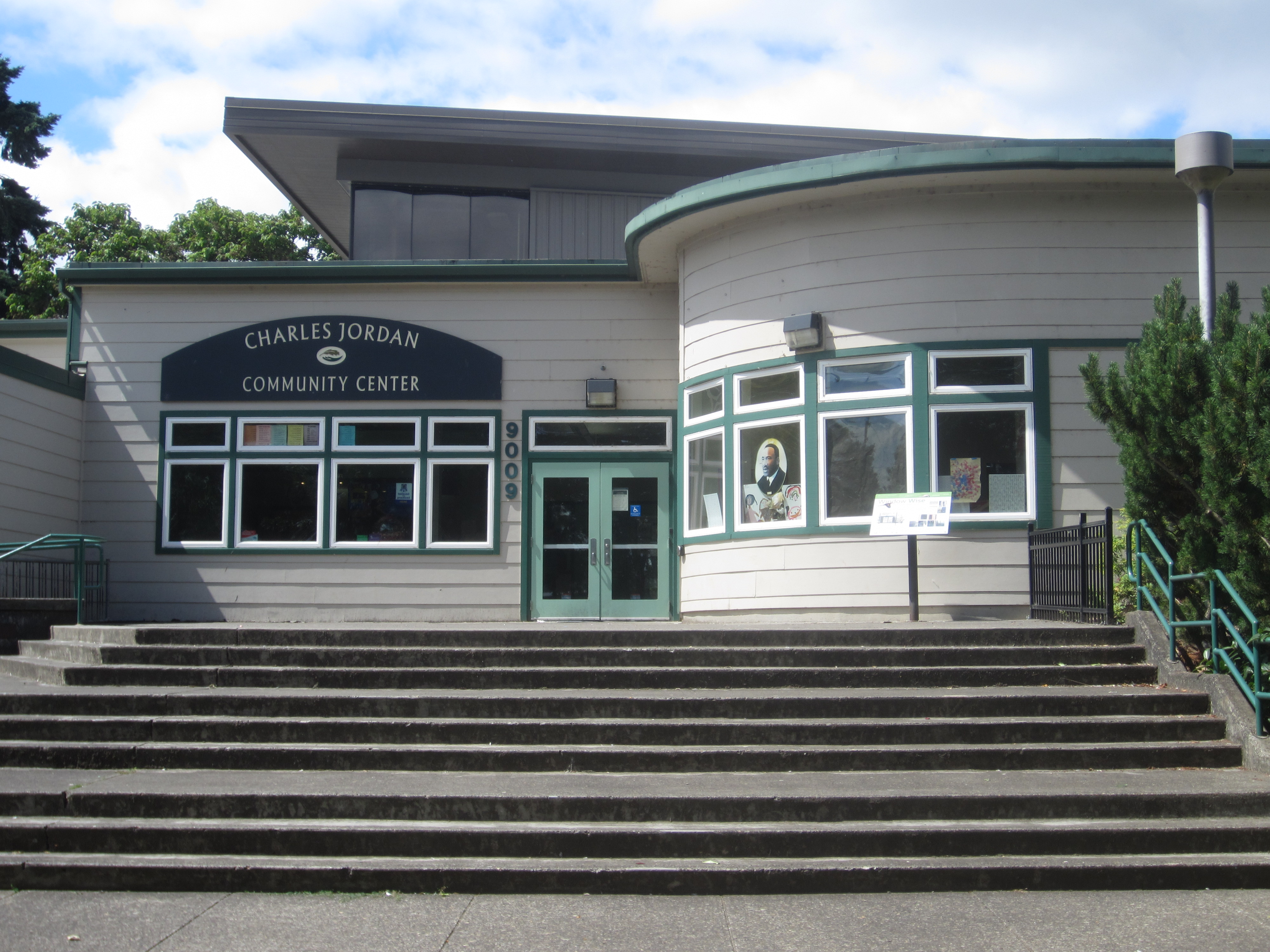
- The center's main entrance, 2019
- Interactive map of the Charles Jordan Community Center area
- Etymology: Charles Jordan

General information
- Type: Community center
- Location: Portland, Oregon, United States
- Coordinates: 45.587818°N 122.7111837°W

The Charles Jordan Community Center is a community center in Portland, Oregon's Portsmouth neighborhood, maintained by Portland Parks & Recreation. The center is named after Charles Jordan.

== See also ==
- List of sports venues in Portland, Oregon
