= Henry S. Rowe =

American politician

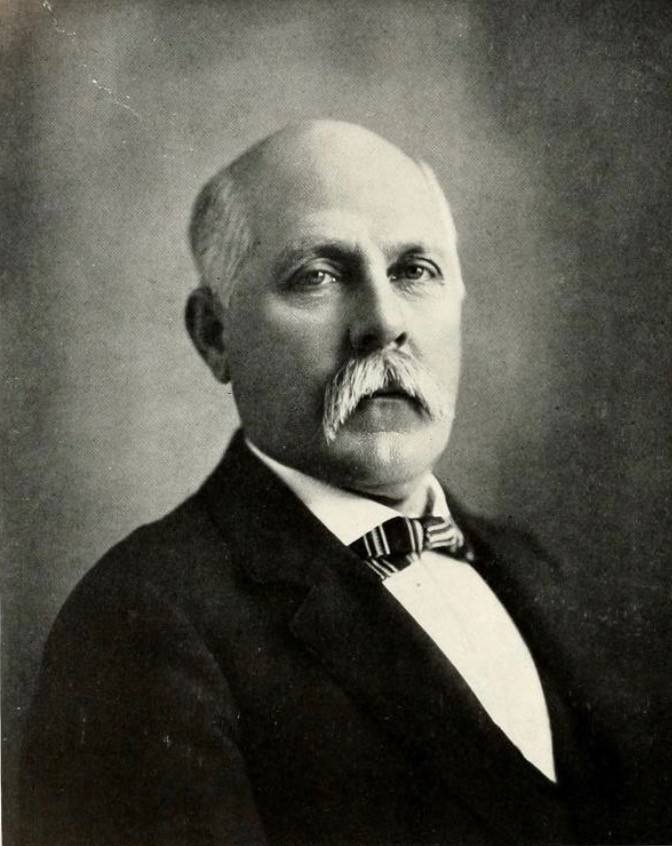

33rd Mayor of Portland, Oregon
- In office 1900–1902
- Preceded by: W. A. Storey
- Succeeded by: George Henry Williams

Personal details
- Born: October 11, 1851; Bolivar, New York, U.S.
- Died: March 20, 1914 (aged 62); Sauvie Island, near Portland, Oregon, U.S.
- Political party: Republican
- Profession: Businessman, politician

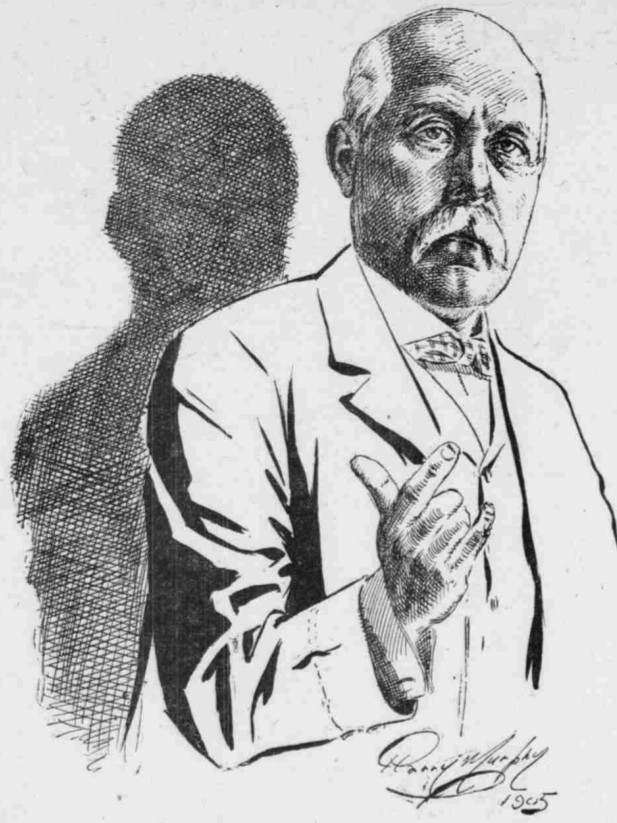
A sketch of Rowe, 1905

Henry Spoor Rowe (October 11, 1851 – March 20, 1914) was an American businessman and politician. He served as the Mayor of Portland, Oregon, from 1900 to 1902.

== Background ==
Rowe was born in Bolivar, New York, on October 11, 1851 (another source says October 18), one of the six children of John S. Rowe and Hulda Peck Rowe. The family moved to Wisconsin and Henry Rowe began working for the Chicago, Milwaukee, and St. Paul Railroad as a telegraph operator at the age of thirteen. He held numerous positions in the railroad industry, working primarily in Kansas. Rowe met Agnes Hefly in Kansas; they were married and had two sons. Rowe moved to Oregon in 1880, initially working for the steamship division of Henry Villard's newly established Oregon Railroad and Navigation Company.

== Political career ==
After becoming active in politics at the county and state level, Rowe was elected Mayor of Portland, Oregon, as a member of the Republican Party, defeating the incumbent W. A. Storey. He was elected on June 4, 1900, and took office on July 2, 1900. During Rowe's term, Portland's first Board of Park Commissioners was established. Rowe also served as president of the Board of Fire Commissioners and on the city's Water Committee. He is noted for his interest in developing Oregon's scenic attractions and also for reducing city expenditures.

== Later career ==
Rowe returned to the railroad industry after his term as Portland's mayor. He was also involved in the banking and real estate industries. Rowe later went into business with Lee Holden, a former Portland Fire Chief. Rowe and Holden constructed the Rhododendron Inn near Mount Hood in 1905. A post office was established nearby in 1909; the town was christened "Rowe" in his honor, but the name was eventually changed to Rhododendron, Oregon. Rowe died on March 20, 1914, of heart disease at a duck farm he owned on Sauvie Island. He is buried in Lone Fir Cemetery.

Preceded by W. A. Storey	Mayor of Portland, Oregon; 1900–1902	Succeeded by George Henry Williams
