= William A. Storey =

Mayor of Portland, Oregon

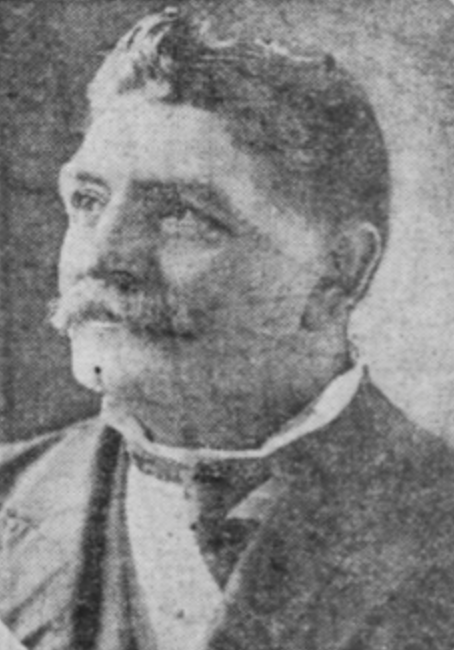

32nd Mayor of Portland, Oregon
- In office 1899–1900
- Preceded by: William S. Mason
- Succeeded by: Henry S. Rowe

Personal details
- Born: January 4, 1854 Machias, Maine, U.S.
- Died: July 29, 1917 (aged 63) Portland, Oregon, U.S.

William A. Storey (January 4, 1854 – July 29, 1917) was the mayor of Portland, Oregon, United States, from 1899 to 1900. He later served as Multnomah County Sheriff, from 1902 to 1904.

Born in Machias, Maine, Storey moved to Oregon in 1877. He was elected to the Portland city council in 1898. After the death of mayor William S. Mason while in office, Storey was elected by the council to serve the remainder of Mason's mayoral term. After initially serving as acting mayor for several weeks, Storey was elected as mayor by the council on May 16, 1899, and sworn in on May 17.

Storey ran for public election to the office in spring 1900, but was defeated by Henry S. Rowe, who took office on July 2, 1900.

Storey later served as sheriff of Multnomah County. During his term as sheriff, he was involved in the pursuit of the notorious outlaw Bill Miner. He was an official witness to the execution of Pleasant Armstrong.

Preceded by William S. Mason	Mayor of Portland, Oregon; 1899–1900	Succeeded by Henry S. Rowe
