= Lloyd Anderson (politician) =

American politician

Executive director of the Port of Portland
- In office 1974–1987

Portland City Commissioner
- In office 1969–1974
- Succeeded by: Charles Jordan

Personal details
- Born: Lloyd Edward Anderson; March 22, 1925 Spokane, Washington
- Died: March 9, 2017 (aged 91) Portland, Oregon, U.S.
- Spouse: Pauline Anderson
- Education: University of Washington (BS)
- Profession: Politician

Lloyd Edward Anderson (March 22, 1925 – March 9, 2017) was an American politician in the state of Oregon who served as a member of the Portland City Council from 1969 to 1974 and as the second executive director of the Port of Portland from 1974 to 1987.

Anderson attended the University of Washington, where he received a Bachelor of Science degree in civil engineering in 1950. Before joining the city council, he worked for engineering firm CH2M for five years.

He was married to Pauline Anderson and lived in the Sellwood-Moreland neighborhood. He died on March 9, 2017, at age 91.
