= Mayor of Portland, Oregon =

Head of the Portland, Oregon municipal government

- Seal of Portland, Oregon

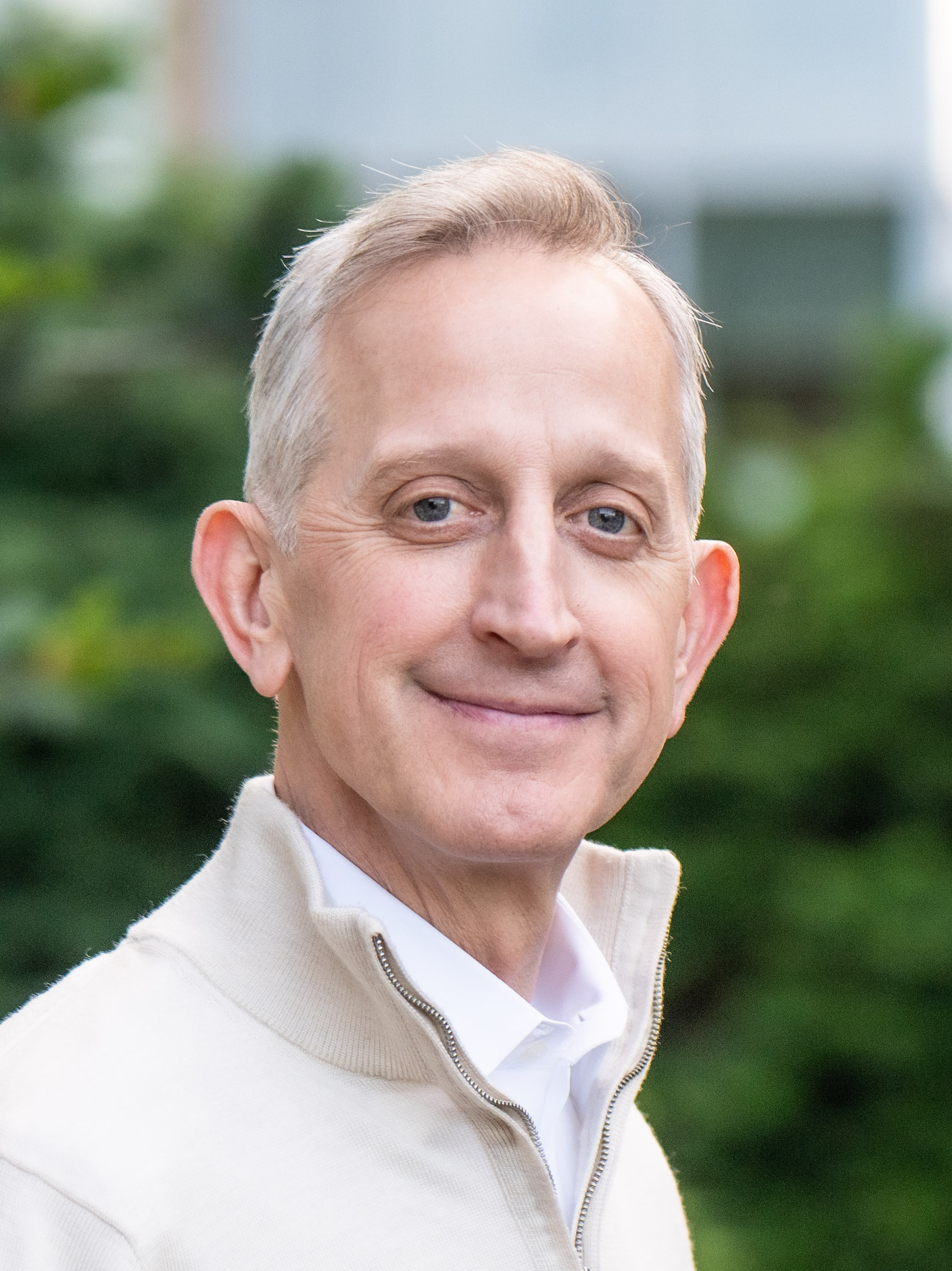
- Incumbent; Keith Wilson since January 1, 2025
- Style: Mayor
- Term length: Four years
- Inaugural holder: Hugh O'Bryant
- Formation: 1851
- Salary: $175,463

The mayor of Portland, Oregon, is the official head of the city of Portland, Oregon, United States. The officeholder is elected for a four-year term and has no term limits. By law, all elections in Portland are nonpartisan. The current mayor is Keith Wilson, who has served since January 1, 2025, and was first elected in the 2024 election.

The current term for mayor of Portland is four years, having been increased from two years in 1913. Mayoral elections were previously held in May of U.S. presidential election years (years divisible by four), during the Oregon primary election, with a runoff between the top two vote-getters held in November of the same year should no candidate garner a majority vote in the May election, however a new system taking effect in 2024 holds a single general election in November of presidential election years using the instant runoff ranked choice voting method. The mayor-elect takes office the following January.

== Duties and powers ==
Prior to 2025, Portland used a city commission government, the last major city to do so. The mayor and commissioners were responsible for legislative policy and oversaw the various bureaus tasked with day-to-day operation of the city. The mayor served as chairman of the council, and was responsible for allocating department assignments to his fellow commissioners. The mayor's power included declaring an emergency and acting as police commissioner.

Beginning with the 2025 mayoral term, Portland switched to a Council-Mayor form of government. The executive mayor works with a professional city administrator to implement the laws enacted by council and administer the city’s bureaus, employees, facilities, and resources. The executive mayor develops and proposes the city’s budget to council for review and approval, may introduce measures before the council, and breaks tie votes in the council.

== Elections ==
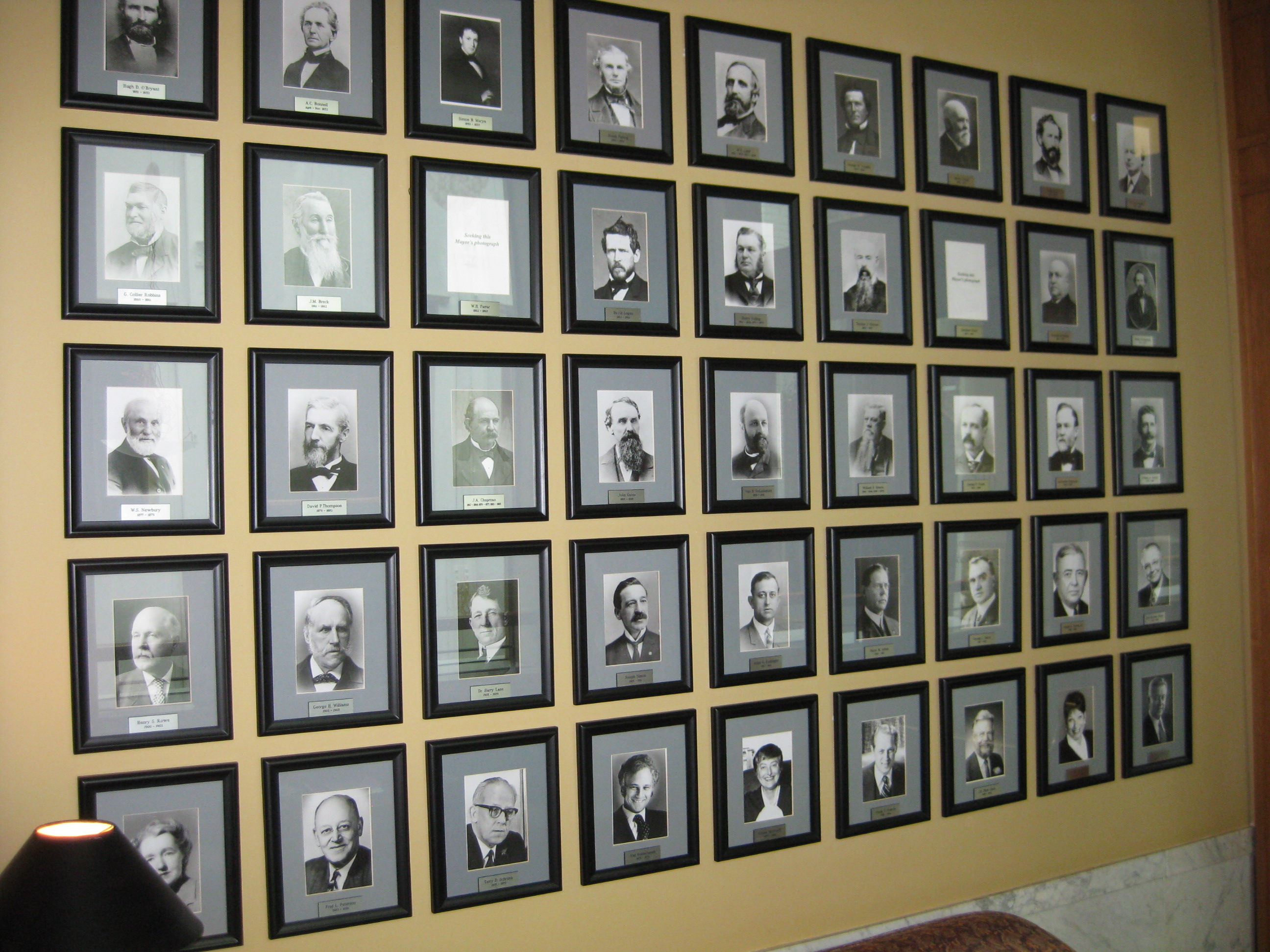
Gallery of the mayors of Portland

The mayor is elected in citywide election. Elections utilize the instant runoff ranked choice voting method, beginning with the 2024 general election. The city charter also allows for write-in candidates. The mayor is elected to a four-year term with no term limits. The office of mayor is officially nonpartisan by state law, although most mayoral candidates identify a party preference. Mayoral elections happen in conjunction with the United States presidential election. Elections followed a two-round system prior to 2024 where the first round of the elections was a primary election. If a candidate received a majority of the vote in the primary they were elected outright, however, If no candidate received a majority the top two candidates advance to a runoff election, called the general election.

The most recent election was in 2024, when businessman Keith Wilson defeated 19 other candidates.

== List of mayors ==
#	Image	Name (birth–death)	Term	Election	Previous office/occupation
1		Hugh O'Bryant (1813–1883)	1851–1852		Officer in the Oregon Riflemen
2		A. C. Bonnell (1801–1875)	April 1852 – November 1852		
3		Simon B. Marye (c. 1810–1868)	November 1852 – April 1853		
4		Josiah Failing (1806–1877)	1853–1854		Member of the Portland City Council (1852)
5		William S. Ladd (1826–1893)	1854–1855		Member of the Portland City Council (1853)
6		George W. Vaughn (1809–1877)	1855–1856		
7		James O'Neill (1824–1901)	1856–1857		Agent for Wells Fargo & Company
8		William S. Ladd (1826–1893)	1857–1858		5th Mayor of Portland (1854–1855)
9		A. M. Starr (c. 1820–1891)	1858–1859		Member of the Portland City Council (1854, 1856)
10		S. J. McCormick (1828–1891)	1859–1860		Delegate to the Oregon Constitutional Convention from Multnomah County
11		G. Collier Robbins (1823–19??)	1860–1861		Member of the Portland City Council (1855, 1858)
12		John M. Breck (1828–1900)	1861–1862		City Assessor of Portland
13		William H. Farrar (1826–1873)	1862–1863		Delegate to the Oregon Constitutional Convention from Multnomah County District Attorney for the Oregon Territory (1853–1859)
14		David Logan (1824–1874)	1863–1864		Member of the Oregon Territorial Legislature from Washington County
15		Henry Failing (1834–1898)	1864 – November 16, 1866		
16		Thomas J. Holmes (1819–1867)	1866–1867		Member of the Portland Public Schools Board of Education
17		J. A. Chapman (1821–1885)	1867–1868		Major/Surgeon in the United States Army
18		Hamilton Boyd	1868–1869		Multnomah County Commissioner
19		Bernard Goldsmith (1832–1901)	1869–1871		Director of the Library Association of Portland
20		Philip Wasserman (1828–1895)	1871–1873		
21		Henry Failing (1834–1898)	1873–1875		15th Mayor of Portland (1864–1866)
22		J. A. Chapman (1821–1885)	1875–1877		17th Mayor of Portland (1867–1868)
23		William Spencer Newbury (1834–1915)	1877–1879		Mayor of Iola, Kansas (1870)
24		David P. Thompson (1834–1901)	1879–1882		6th Governor of the Idaho Territory (1875–1876)
25		J. A. Chapman (1821–1885)	1882–1885		17th and 22nd Mayor of Portland (1867–1868, 1875–1877)
26		John Gates (1827–1888)	1885 – April 27, 1888 (died in office)		President of the Portland National Bank
27		Van B. DeLashmutt (1842–1921)	May 2, 1888 – 1891		
28		William S. Mason (1832–1899)	1891–1894		
29		George P. Frank (1852–1896)	1894–1896		
30		Sylvester Pennoyer (1831–1902)	1896–1898		8th Governor of Oregon (1887–1895)
31		William S. Mason (1832–1899)	July 1, 1898 – March 27, 1899 (died in office)		28th Mayor of Portland (1891–1894)
32		W. A. Storey (1854–1917)	May 17, 1899 –1900		Member of the Portland City Council (1898–1899)
33		Henry S. Rowe (1851–1914)	1900–1902	1900	
34		George Henry Williams (1823–1910)	1902–1905		32nd United States Attorney General (1871–1875)
35		Harry Lane (1855–1917)	1905–1909		Superintendent of the Oregon State Insane Asylum (1887–1891)
36		Joseph Simon (1851–1935)	1909–1911		United States Senator from Oregon (1898–1903)
37		Allen G. Rushlight (1874–1930)	1911–1913		Member of the Portland City Council (1905–1911)
38		H. Russell Albee (1867–1950)	June 1913 – July 1917		
39		George L. Baker (1868–1941)	July 1917 – July 1933		Member of the Portland City Commission
40		Joseph K. Carson (1891–1956)	July 1933 – December 31, 1940		
41		Earl Riley (1890–1965)	January 1, 1941 – December 31, 1948		Member of the Portland City Commission (1930–1940)
42		Dorothy McCullough Lee (1901–1981)	January 1, 1949 – December 31, 1952		Member of the Portland City Commission (1943–1949)
43		Fred L. Peterson (1896–1985)	January 1, 1953 – December 31, 1956		Member of the Portland City Commission (1941–1952)
44		Terry Schrunk (1913–1975)	January 1, 1957 – January 1, 1973		24th Sheriff of Multnomah County (1949–1956)
45		Neil Goldschmidt (1940–2024)	January 2, 1973 – August 15, 1979 (Note: Resigned on August 15, 2009, to take office as United States Secretary of Transportation.)		Member of the Portland City Commission (1970–1973)
46		Connie McCready (1921–2000)	September 5, 1979 – November 23, 1980	– (Note: Connie McCready was appointed mayor by her fellow city councilors due to the resignation of Mayor Neil Goldschmidt, who resigned after being appointed United States Secretary of Transportation.)	Member of the Portland City Commission (1970–1979)
47		Frank Ivancie (1924–2019)	November 24, 1980 – January 3, 1985	1980 (Note: Ivancie was elected in two concurrent elections. One to fill the seat for the final weeks of the term ending on January 3, 1981, and another for a full term (beginning the same day).)	Member of the Portland City Commission (1967–1980)
48		Bud Clark (1931–2022)	January 3, 1985 – January 2, 1993	1984 1988	
49		Vera Katz (1933–2017)	January 3, 1993 – January 3, 2005	1992 1996 2000	57th Speaker of the Oregon House of Representatives (1985–1990)
50		Tom Potter (born 1940)	January 3, 2005 – December 31, 2008	2004	38th Chief of the Portland Police Bureau (1990–1990)
51		Sam Adams (born 1963)	January 1, 2009 – December 31, 2012	2008	Member of the Portland City Commission (2005–2009)
52		Charlie Hales (born 1956)	January 1, 2013 – December 31, 2016	2012	Member of the Portland City Commission (1993–2002)
53		Ted Wheeler (born 1962)	January 1, 2017 – December 31, 2024	2016 2020	28th Treasurer of Oregon (2010–2017)
54		Keith Wilson 1962 or 1963 (age 62–63)	January 1, 2025 – present	2024	CEO of Titan Freight Systems (2010–2017)

Note: The color shown in the number (#) column denotes registered political party (red for Republican, blue for Democratic, teal for the People's Party (Populist), gray for Independent). Officially, Mayors run and serve as nonpartisan.

The City of Portland mayor's office, in the City Hall, contains a collection of mounted portraits of all the mayors to date. As of February 2024, only two mayors are missing from the collection; William H. Farrar (1862–1863) and Hamilton Boyd (1868–1869).

== See also ==
- Government of Portland, Oregon
- History of Portland, Oregon
