= Mike Lindberg =

American politician

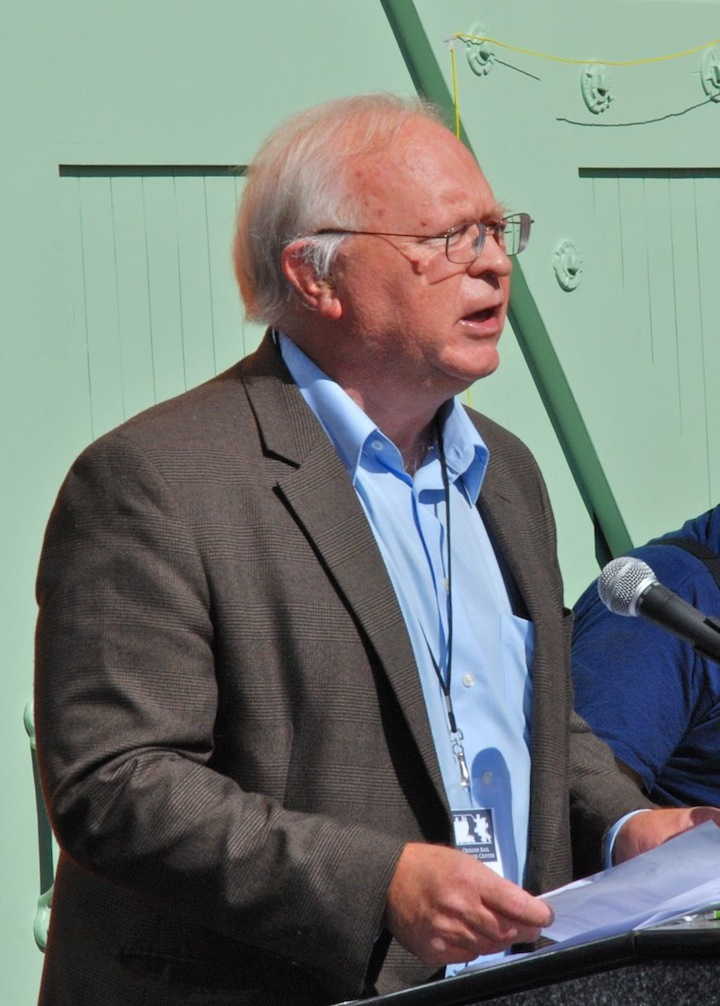
- Lindberg in 2012

Portland City Commissioner
- In office October 17, 1979 – December 31, 1996
- Preceded by: Connie McCready
- Succeeded by: Jim Francesconi

Personal details
- Born: January 1941 (age 85) Portland, Oregon
- Spouse: Carolyn
- Children: 3

Mike Lindberg (born January 1941) is an American politician who served on the Portland, Oregon City Council from 1979 until 1996. His tenure of 17 years, three months was the longest of any city commissioner in the past 40 years, as of 2009; Lindberg's tenure was surpassed in May 2016 by that of Dan Saltzman.

== Career ==
Lindberg was appointed to the council in September 1979, to fill a seat caused by the appointment of Connie McCready to the position of mayor. He was subsequently elected to the office and served until the end of 1996, when he retired. He currently works as a lobbyist and political consultant.

== Personal life ==
Lindberg is a 1963 graduate of the University of Oregon with a bachelor's degree in economics.

Lindberg is married to his (second) wife Carolyn and he had one daughter, Lisa, and twin boys from his first marriage. He was raising his granddaughter, Caitlin, after Lisa's death at 43 in 2007.

In 2006, Lindberg was diagnosed with peripheral neuropathy.
