= Connie McCready =

American politician (1921–2000)

46th Mayor of Portland, Oregon
- In office September 5, 1979 – November 24, 1980
- Preceded by: Neil Goldschmidt
- Succeeded by: Frank Ivancie

Portland City Commissioner
- In office March 19, 1970 – September 5, 1979
- Preceded by: Stanley W. Earl
- Succeeded by: Mike Lindberg

Member of the Oregon House of Representatives from the 6th district
- In office 1967–1969

Personal details
- Born: August 20, 1921 Pendleton, Oregon, U.S.
- Died: December 22, 2000 (aged 79) Portland, Oregon, U.S.
- Party: Republican
- Spouse: Albert L. McCready
- Education: University of Oregon
- Profession: Journalist

Constance McCready (born Constance Averill, August 20, 1921 – December 22, 2000) was an American journalist and politician from Portland, Oregon, in the United States. She held several elected offices in Oregon during her career, including the Oregon House of Representatives, the Portland City Council, and culminating with a partial term as Portland's mayor. To date, McCready remains the last Republican to serve as mayor of the city.

== Early life ==
She was born in Pendleton, Oregon on August 21, 1921, the daughter of conservationist Edgar Francis Averill. The family moved to Portland and she graduated from Grant High School. McCready graduated from the University of Oregon in 1943. After college she worked as a reporter for The Oregonian, Portland's main daily newspaper, later becoming the Home and Garden editor for the paper. In 1945, she married Albert L. McCready and the two had three daughters.

== Politics ==
In 1967 and 1969, she served in the Oregon House of Representatives as a Republican representing Portland.

McCready was appointed to the Portland City Council in 1970, to fill a vacancy caused by the death of commissioner Stanley W. Earl, and was sworn in on March 19, 1970. She proceeded to serve as a commissioner (city council member) until 1979, being elected in 1972 and re-elected in 1976. McCready was the second woman to serve on the City Council.

In 1979, by a vote of her fellow city commissioners, McCready was appointed to the position of mayor of Portland upon Neil Goldschmidt's resignation to become United States Secretary of Transportation in the Carter Administration. She assumed office as mayor on September 5, 1979. She was the second of three women to hold the post. McCready was mayor during the 1980 eruption of Mount St. Helens when Portland was blanketed by ash on three occasions, and eventually threatened businesses with fines if they failed to remove the ash from their parking lots. She was defeated in the May 1980 primary by Frank Ivancie, whose succession to the office took effect on November 24, at which point McCready retired from politics.

A Republican, she was noted for her maverick political views which often deviated from the party line, including staunch support of the Equal Rights Amendment and gay rights.

McCready died in 2000 of complications from a stroke.

Preceded by Neil Goldschmidt	Mayor of Portland, Oregon; 1979–1980	Succeeded by Frank Ivancie
