= Governor Grover (sternwheeler) =

Willamette River sternwheel steamboat

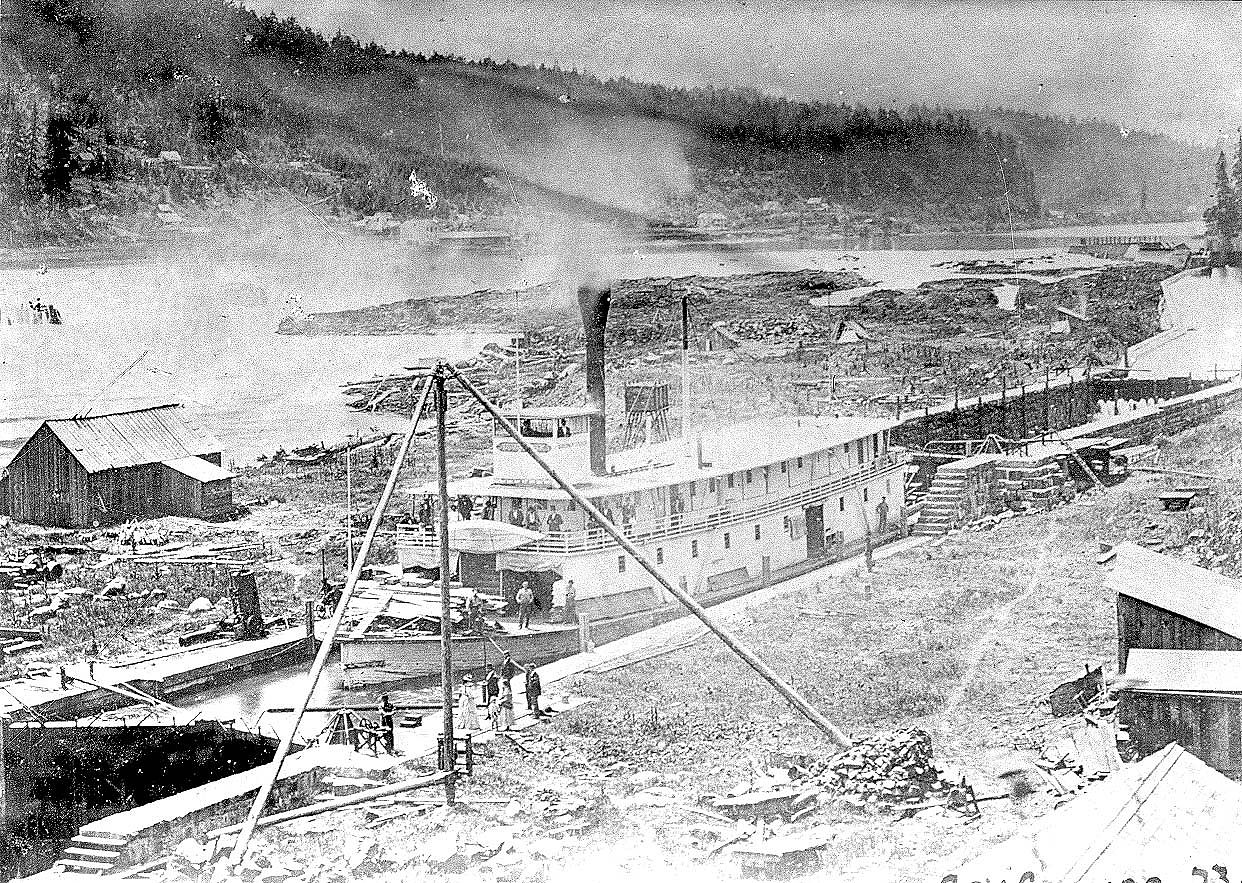
- Governor Grover in Willamette Locks, March 1873, shortly after completion of locks
- Name: Governor Grover
- Owner: Willamette River Navigation Co., Willamette Falls Locks and Canal Co.
- Route: Willamette River
- Launched: 1873, at Portland, Oregon
- Identification: US registry # 85249
- Fate: 1880 Dismantled
- Type: Shallow draft inland passenger/freighter
- Tonnage: 404 gross
- Length: 140 ft (42.7 m)
- Beam: 28.6 ft (8.7 m)
- Depth: 5.5 ft (1.7 m) depth of hold
- Installed power: twin steam engines, horizontally mounted, 19 in (48 cm) bore x 60 in (150 cm) stroke 17 net horsepower. nominal
- Propulsion: sternwheel

Governor Grover was a sternwheel steamboat that ran on the Willamette River during the 1870s. Because of the completion of the Willamette Locks in late 1872, it was possible for vessels such as Governor Grover to be built in Portland, Oregon and then readily navigate the Willamette above Willamette Falls.

== Construction ==
Governor Grover was built in 1873 for the Willamette River Navigation Company which had been formed to compete with the monopoly on the river that was then held by the People's Transportation Company, which by 1873 had come under the control of steamboat and stagecoach magnate Ben Holladay. Among the backers of the Willamette River Navigation Company were the important businessman Bernard Goldsmith and the steamboat men Jacob Kamm and Joseph Kellogg, with the latter supervising construction of the Grover. Grover was named after La Fayette Grover (1823–1911) fourth governor of the state of Oregon (1870–1877). Other vessels built by the Willamette River Navigation Company included the sternwheelers Vancouver (1870), Beaver (1873), and Willamette Chief (1874).

== Operation ==
Grover was launched on January 28, 1873, and made her first trip on March 16, 1873. Officers at first were Charles Holman, Captain, George Marshall, chief engineer, and A. Vickers and Charles Kellogg, pilots. Shortly after construction Governor Grover passed into the ownership of the Willamette Falls Locks and Canal Company. Governor Grover worked on the Willamette River and, on March 18, 1873, was the first large vessel to go as far upriver as Harrisburg. Grover achieved some success in driving down rates, and became popular among the farmers of the Willamette Valley.

In 1874 Capt. Holman was succeeded in command by Capt. James Wilson, who remained with the vessel for several years. The Willamette Falls Locks and Canal Company sold Grover to the Oregon Steam Navigation Company, which worked the vessel on all routes running out of Portland, Oregon.

== Disposition ==
In 1880, Governor Grover was dismantled at Portland, Oregon.
