= Aaron E. Waite =

American judge

4th Chief Justice of the Oregon Supreme Court
- In office 1859–1862
- Preceded by: George Henry Williams
- Succeeded by: Reuben P. Boise

10th Justice of the Oregon Supreme Court
- In office 1859–1862
- Preceded by: George Henry Williams
- Succeeded by: William W. Page

Personal details
- Born: December 26, 1813 Whately, Massachusetts, U.S.
- Died: December 12, 1898 (aged 84) near Canby, Oregon, U.S.

Aaron E. Waite (December 26, 1813 – December 12, 1898) was an American judge and politician. He was the 4th Chief Justice of the Oregon Supreme Court serving from 1859 to 1862. He was the first chief justice after Oregon became a state on February 14, 1859. A Massachusetts native, Waite also served in the Oregon Territorial Legislature.

== Early life ==
Aaron Waite (sometimes spelled "Wait") was born on December 26, 1813, in Franklin County, Massachusetts, where he was raised by his grandfather and an uncle. His father had died as a soldier in the War of 1812. At the age of 14 he became an apprentice broom maker, working for four years until also enrolling in school for two years. Waite then moved to New York at the age of 20.

Once there he taught as an assistant teacher on Long Island at Flatbush in Erasmus Hall. Waite then returned to Massachusetts before moving west in 1837 and settled in Michigan. He settled in Centreville where he studied law under judge Columbia Lancaster and was admitted to the bar in 1842. Later he became the military secretary for governor John S. Barry of Michigan.

== Oregon ==
In 1847, Waite headed to the Oregon Country in a wagon train of 40 wagons. This included Judge Lancaster and Lancaster's family. Once in Oregon he set up a law practice in Oregon City, Oregon, and worked on the Oregon Spectator newspaper. Waite then fought in the Cayuse War before leaving for the gold fields of California in 1849, only to return within a few years.

== Politics ==
Upon returning he was elected as a commissioner to audit the claims from the Cayuse War. Then in 1852 he served in the Oregon Territory House of Representatives. Following an absence from the legislature he returned as a member of the upper chamber Council in 1857 and 1858 serving as a Democrat.

In 1858 he ran and was elected to the Oregon Supreme Court. Prior to this the judges were appointed by the U.S. President as Oregon was still a territory. Wait's term began in 1859 and he served on the state's highest court until resigning on May 1, 1862. During that same time he served as the chief justice of the court.

In July 1867, Waite was elected mayor by the Portland city council following the death of Thomas J. Holmes, who had died the morning after his election. Waite declined the nomination due to ill health and J. A. Chapman was elected instead.

== Later years ==
Waite married twice and had a total of six children, of which both of his wives and four of the children died before him. After serving on the court he retired to his 600-acre (2.4 km^{2}) farm that was located in Clackamas County. In 1891 he moved to Portland, Oregon, with most of his time in retirement spent managing his land holdings in the Pacific Northwest. Aaron E. Waite died on his farm near Canby on December 12, 1898, at the age of 84.
