= Hamilton Boyd =

American politician

18th Mayor of Portland, Oregon
- In office 1868–1869
- Preceded by: J. A. Chapman
- Succeeded by: Bernard Goldsmith

Personal details
- Born: c. 1831
- Died: March 1883 or October 1886

Hamilton Boyd was an American politician who served as mayor of Portland, Oregon, in 1868-69. He is thought to have come to Portland in 1860, worked as an assistant county clerk, and later worked as an accountant in the Ladd & Tilton bank. He was elected to a two-year term as county commissioner in 1868 and served as mayor from 1868 to 1869. He was elected mayor on June 16, 1868, and assumed office later that month. He was succeeded as mayor by Bernard Goldsmith in 1869.

Sources differ on when Boyd died, with at least one source saying he died in Portland in 1886, while The Oregonian reported that he died in March 1883.

Preceded by J. A. Chapman	Mayor of Portland, Oregon; 1868–1869	Succeeded by Bernard Goldsmith
