= William Spencer Newbury =

American politician

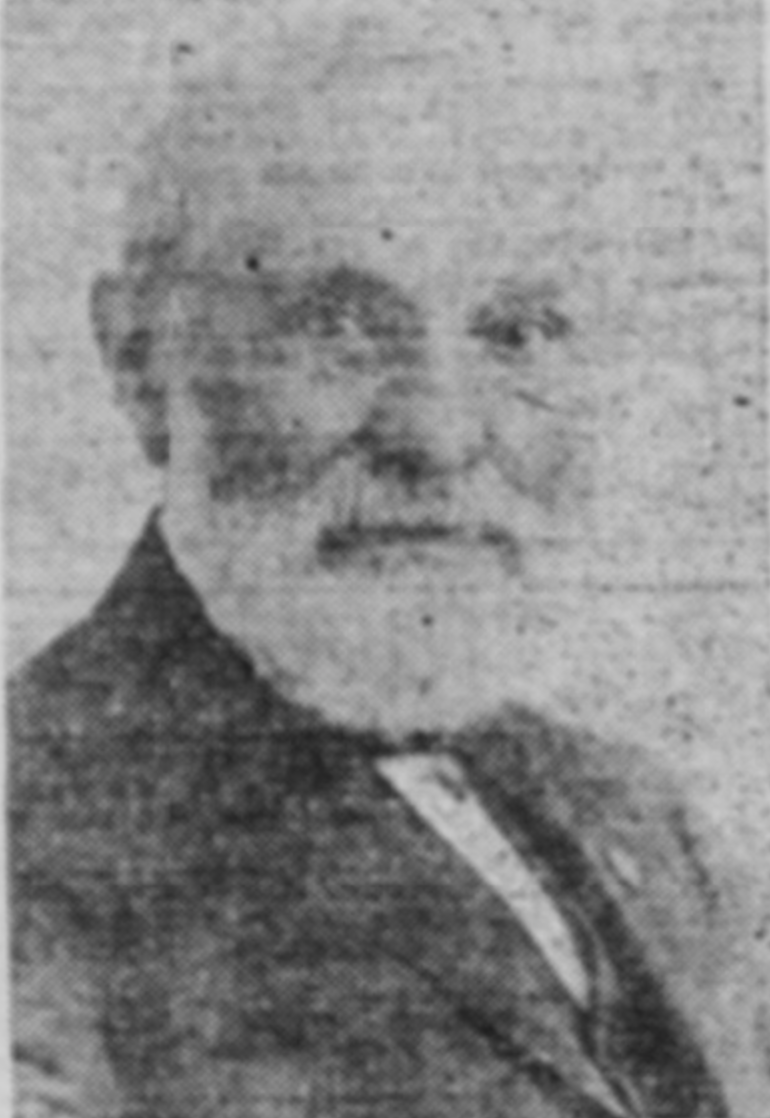
- Newbury in an undated photo published in 1915

23rd Mayor of Portland, Oregon
- In office 1877–1879
- Preceded by: J. A. Chapman
- Succeeded by: David P. Thompson

Mayor of Iola, Kansas
- In office 1870

Personal details
- Born: September 19, 1834; Ripley, New York, U.S.
- Died: November 19, 1915 (aged 81); Portland, Oregon, U.S.
- Political party: Republican
- Education: Wisconsin Mercantile College
- Profession: Lawyer, businessman, politician

William Spencer Newbury (September 19, 1834 – November 19, 1915), commonly known as W. S. Newbury, was an American businessman, politician, and lawyer active in the U.S. Midwest and Oregon who served as the mayor of Portland, Oregon from 1877 to 1879.

== Early life ==
Newbury was born in Ripley, New York, on September 19, 1834. He graduated from the Wisconsin Mercantile College in Madison, Wisconsin, in the mid-1850s. After traveling around the U.S. South for several months, he lived for a time in St. Paul, Minnesota, and then in Sioux City, Iowa. In 1860, he married Alzina Taylor.

== Career ==
=== 1860s ===
During the American Civil War, Newbury served in the 6th Regiment Kansas Volunteer Cavalry, rising to the rank of first lieutenant. He later served in the Army of the Cumberland, fighting for the Union in the Battle of Chickamauga and the battles of Missionary Ridge and Lookout Mountain. After the war, Newbury was appointed Assistant Provost Marshal of the State of Kansas. He passed the bar in Kansas in 1865 and practiced law there for a time. He served as the elected mayor of Iola, Kansas, but resigned in 1870 after deciding to move to the West Coast, where he settled in Portland, Oregon, in August of that year.

=== Oregon ===
==== Business ====
In Oregon, Newbury worked as a buyer and shipper in the wheat business. He co-founded the Newbury-Chapman Company with J. A. Chapman and J. C. Hawthorne, and was its manager. Located in Portland, the company sold implements and supplies for use in agriculture.

==== Politics ====
In May 1876, he was nominated to be a candidate for the Oregon Legislature "in his absence and without previous consultation with him", The Morning Oregonian newspaper reported. He declined to run, saying that serving would take too much time away from his business activities.

On June 18, 1877, Newbury was elected mayor of Portland. He served a two-year term, from July 1877 to July 1879, during which time he maintained a good relationship with the city council.

=== Later years ===
William Newbury moved to Eastern Oregon in 1900. In the last "few years" of his life, he practiced law in Baker County, Oregon, but he returned to Portland about one year before his death, which occurred on November 19, 1915, at his home in Portland, about two weeks after he had suffered a stroke.

Preceded by J. A. Chapman	Mayor of Portland, Oregon; 1877–1879	Succeeded by David P. Thompson
