= 1890 Oregon gubernatorial election =

- June 2, 1890
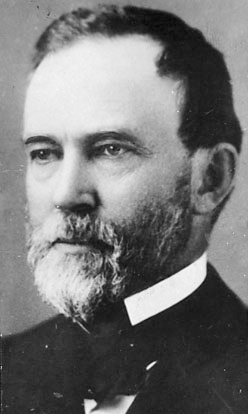

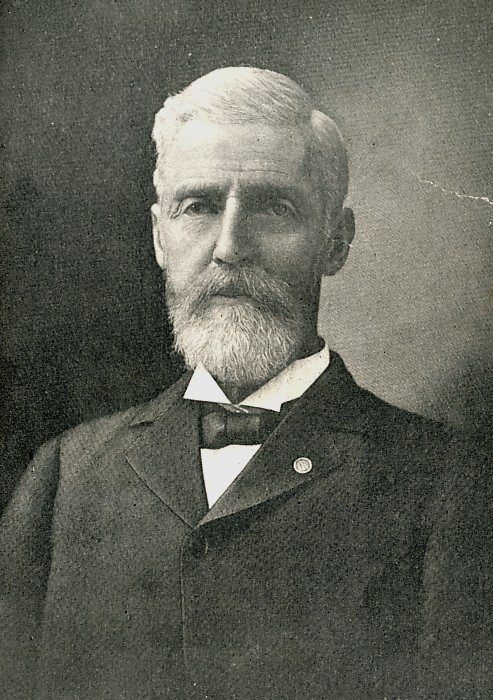
Nominee	Sylvester Pennoyer	David P. Thompson
Party	Democratic	Republican
Popular vote	38,920	33,765
Percentage	53.55%	46.45%
- County results Pennoyer: 50–60% 60–70% Thompson: 50–60% 60–70%
Governor before election
Sylvester Pennoyer
Democratic
Elected Governor
Sylvester Pennoyer
Democratic

The 1890 Oregon gubernatorial election took place on June 2, 1890, to elect the governor of the U.S. state of Oregon. The election matched Republican businessman and former Portland mayor David P. Thompson against Democratic incumbent Sylvester Pennoyer.

== Results ==
1890 Oregon gubernatorial election
Party	Candidate	Votes	%	±%
Democratic	Sylvester Pennoyer (incumbent)	38,920	53.55%	+2.66%
Republican	David P. Thompson	33,765	46.45%	+2.32%
Total votes		72,685	100.00%	
Majority		5,155	7.09%	
Democratic hold		Swing	+0.34%	

=== Results by county ===
This is the most recent gubernatorial election in which a Democrat has won statewide but lost in Multnomah County. Moreover, Multnomah County would not back the losing candidate again until 1948. Tillamook County voted Democratic for the first time since 1858. Klamath County would not vote Democratic again until 1970.

County	Sylvester Pennoyer Democratic		David P. Thompson Republican		Margin		Total votes cast
County	#	%	#	%	#	%	Total votes cast
Baker	1,032	55.07%	842	44.93%	190	10.14%	1,874
Benton	1,359	55.49%	1,090	44.51%	269	10.98%	2,449
Clackamas	1,576	50.27%	1,559	49.73%	17	0.54%	3,135
Clatsop	1,257	46.73%	1,433	53.27%	-176	-6.54%	2,690
Columbia	517	38.87%	813	61.13%	-296	-22.26%	1,330
Coos	1,047	54.00%	892	46.00%	155	7.99%	1,939
Crook	740	69.03%	332	30.97%	408	38.06%	1,072
Curry	205	44.57%	255	55.43%	-50	-10.87%	460
Douglas	1,554	52.89%	1,384	47.11%	170	5.79%	2,938
Gilliam	594	57.17%	445	42.83%	149	14.34%	1,039
Grant	715	51.85%	664	48.15%	51	3.70%	1,379
Harney	552	53.23%	485	46.77%	67	6.46%	1,037
Jackson	1,682	59.54%	1,143	40.46%	539	19.08%	2,825
Josephine	690	50.04%	689	49.96%	1	0.07%	1,379
Klamath	425	57.35%	316	42.65%	109	14.71%	741
Lake	484	59.46%	330	40.54%	154	18.92%	814
Lane	1,996	54.63%	1,658	45.37%	338	9.25%	3,654
Linn	2,345	58.51%	1,663	41.49%	682	17.02%	4,008
Malheur	362	51.79%	337	48.21%	25	3.58%	699
Marion	2,310	49.82%	2,327	50.18%	-17	-0.37%	4,637
Morrow	689	60.54%	449	39.46%	240	21.09%	1,138
Multnomah	6,338	49.51%	6,464	50.49%	-126	-0.98%	12,802
Polk	1,254	57.71%	919	42.29%	335	15.42%	2,173
Sherman	272	56.31%	211	43.69%	61	12.63%	483
Tillamook	424	51.33%	402	48.67%	22	2.66%	826
Umatilla	2,203	62.75%	1,308	37.25%	895	25.49%	3,511
Union	2,202	59.98%	1,469	40.02%	733	19.97%	3,671
Wallowa	403	45.90%	475	54.10%	-72	-8.20%	878
Wasco	1,257	58.47%	893	41.53%	364	16.93%	2,150
Washington	1,228	49.62%	1,247	50.38%	-19	-0.77%	2,475
Yamhill	1,208	48.73%	1,271	51.27%	-63	-2.54%	2,479
Total	38,920	53.55%	33,765	46.45%	5,155	7.09%	72,685

==== Counties that flipped from Republican to Democratic ====
- Coos
- Tillamook

==== Counties that flipped from Democratic to Republican ====
- Clatsop
- Columbia
- Multnomah
