= J. A. Chapman =

American politician

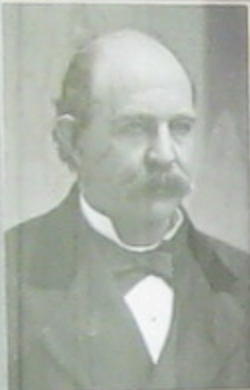

17th, 22nd and 25th Mayor of Portland, Oregon
- In office 1867–1868
- Preceded by: Thomas J. Holmes
- Succeeded by: Hamilton Boyd
- In office 1875–1877
- Preceded by: Henry Failing
- Succeeded by: William Spencer Newbury
- In office 1882–1885
- Preceded by: David P. Thompson
- Succeeded by: John Gates

Personal details
- Born: September 4, 1821 Friendship, New York, US
- Died: December 12, 1885 (aged 64) Portland, Oregon, US
- Party: Democratic
- Profession: Physician, politician

James A. Chapman (September 4, 1821 – December 12, 1885) was a medical doctor in the U.S. state of Oregon who served three non-consecutive terms as mayor of Portland, Oregon.

== Early life ==
Chapman was born in Friendship, New York. He studied medicine and graduated from Geneva Medical College in 1846. He set up a medical practice in Cuba, New York, and after a few years, moved to Dundee, New York, where he began another practice.

== Travel to Oregon ==
In 1861, with the onset of the American Civil War, Chapman volunteered for service and was appointed surgeon with the 50th New York Regiment. He remained with the regiment as it moved south until 1862, when he was transferred to an overland expedition under Captain Medorem Crawford to assist emigrants to Oregon.

After the expedition arrived in Portland, Oregon, in late 1862, Chapman joined James C. Hawthorne's medical practice, but Hawthorne left shortly after to run the newly established Oregon Hospital for the Insane. Chapman began a new practice with William H. Watkins.

== Mayor of Portland ==
In June 1867, mayor Thomas J. Holmes, who had been appointed the previous year after the resignation of Henry Failing, was elected to a full term, and then died the following morning. Judge Aaron E. Waite was first chosen by the City Council to replace Holmes, but declined due to ill health. Chapman was appointed mayor on July 31, 1867, and served until the following June, when a special election to complete Holmes' term was won by Hamilton Boyd.

In the early 1870s, Chapman was appointed surgeon-general to the Oregon militia by Governor La Fayette Grover. In 1875, he sought election as mayor against incumbent Henry Failing. Chapman defeated Failing, who had been criticized for a number of his ordinances and his response to a massive 1872 fire that consumed 22 blocks of the Portland waterfront. Chapman served one two-year term, and then ran again in 1882, defeating another incumbent, David P. Thompson.

== Death ==
Late in 1885, Chapman suffered serious injuries after being thrown from his carriage when he drove it into a low-hanging telephone wire. A few weeks later, he suffered a stroke and died from his injuries. He is buried in Lone Fir Cemetery.
