= Henry Failing =

American politician

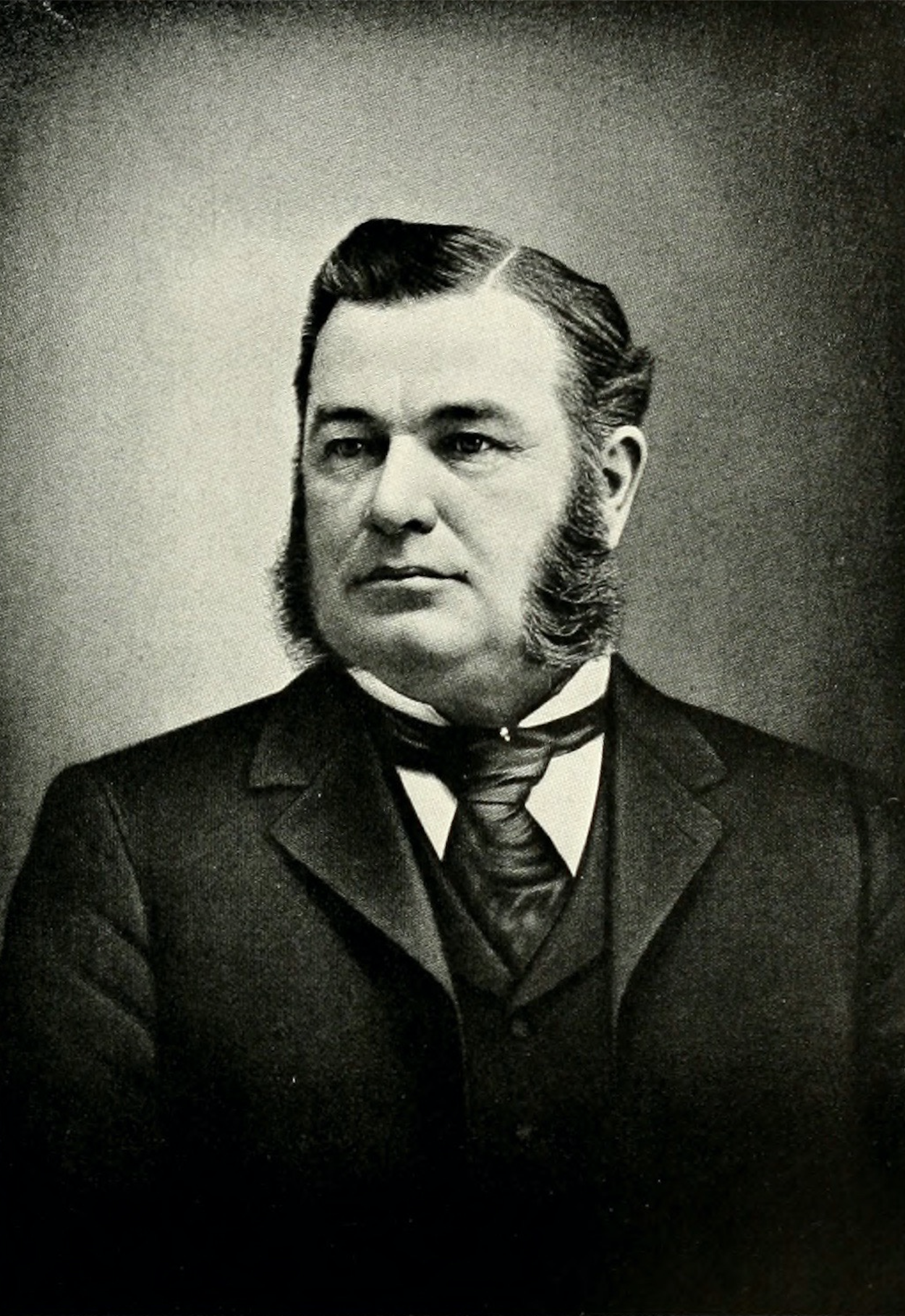

15th Mayor of Portland, Oregon
- In office 1864–1866
- Preceded by: David Logan
- Succeeded by: Thomas J. Holmes

21st Mayor of Portland, Oregon
- In office 1873–1875
- Preceded by: Philip Wasserman
- Succeeded by: J. A. Chapman

Personal details
- Born: January 17, 1834 New York City, New York, U.S.
- Died: November 8, 1898 (aged 64) Portland, Oregon, U.S.
- Party: Republican
- Spouse: Emily Phelps Corbett

Henry Failing (January 17, 1834 – November 8, 1898) was a banker, and one of the leading businessmen of the Pacific Northwest of the United States. He was one of Portland, Oregon's earliest residents, and served as that city's mayor in two non-consecutive periods, two-and-a-half years (two 15-month terms) starting in 1864 and later a two-year term starting in 1873. He was a Republican.

== Early life ==
Henry Failing was born in New York City on January 17, 1834, to Josiah Failing and Henrietta (Ellison) Failing, one of eleven children. His ancestors were considered, by one biographer, "substantial citizens of the east." He was educated in New York's public schools until the age of 12. He began his business career in a French importing and shipping house, where he learned the French language and business accounting. He then became the junior bookkeeper for Eno, Mahoney & Co., one of the largest wholesale dry goods houses in the city, a few years later. He was also in charge of their foreign business. In April 1851 he accompanied his father and younger brother John in a move to Portland. Mr. Eno, Failing's former boss, would later describe the loss of Henry Failing as a business contact as a mistake.

== Family business in Oregon ==
Henry Failing left New York on April 15, 1851, with his father and younger brother. They traveled via steamer to the Chagres River in Panama, by boat up the river, across Panama by mule train, and then to San Francisco aboard the Tennessee. The final leg of their journey, aboard the Columbia, took them to Portland on June 9. Henry befriended C. H. Lewis, later a business associate, on the last leg of the journey.

At the time, Portland was merely a hamlet, with fewer than 500 residents. He and his father established a general merchandising business, J. Failing & Co., on Front Street (now Naito Parkway), one door south of Oak Street. The business grew rapidly in its first few years. In 1853, Josiah was elected as Portland's fourth mayor, serving until 1854. Henry also became majority owner in the family business in that year. Josiah retired in 1864, and Henry narrowed the business's focus to hardware and iron supplies in 1868. He would remain associated with the business until January 1893.

On October 21, 1858, Failing married Emily Phelps Corbett, sister of U.S. Senator-to-be Henry W. Corbett, who was a neighbor of the Failing family business. Emily died of tuberculosis on July 8, 1870, leaving three daughters.

== Portland politician ==
Failing was elected to the first of his three terms as mayor of Portland in 1864. It was said he hadn't aspired to political office, but that the people of Portland admired his apparent immunity to typical partisan politics. Failing was concerned that Portland's roads were "a reproach to the city and its inhabitants;" one of his first actions as mayor was to pass a city charter amendment, which required property owners to pay for the grading and paving of streets adjacent to their property. He then passed measures and ordinances improving the government efficiency, many of which have lasted into the 21st century. His first term accomplishments included forecasting budget revenues, codifying city ordinances, financing gas street lamps, funding the removal of snags from the Willamette River, and sewer planning.

Failing was elected to a second 15-month term in June 1865, with only five votes cast against him out of 790, making it the nearest-unanimous mayoral election in Portland history (as of 2009). Though popular, Failing resigned in November 1866; no reason for his resignation was recorded.

Failing was later elected to a third term as mayor in 1873, on the Citizens Ticket. It was a narrow victory this time; the margin was 40 votes out of 2,036. On August 2, a month after he took office, 22 blocks along Portland's waterfront, near SW Alder Street, burned in the largest fire in Portland history. Failing was criticized for his response to the fire, but public opposition to several of his ordinances was considered the reason for his loss to J. A. Chapman in his final campaign for mayor in 1875.

After retiring from professional politics, Failing was appointed to Portland's water committee in 1886, and later served as its chairman. The committee purchased and enlarged the old water works, and developed plans for a new system of water supply.

== Expanded career in banking and business ==
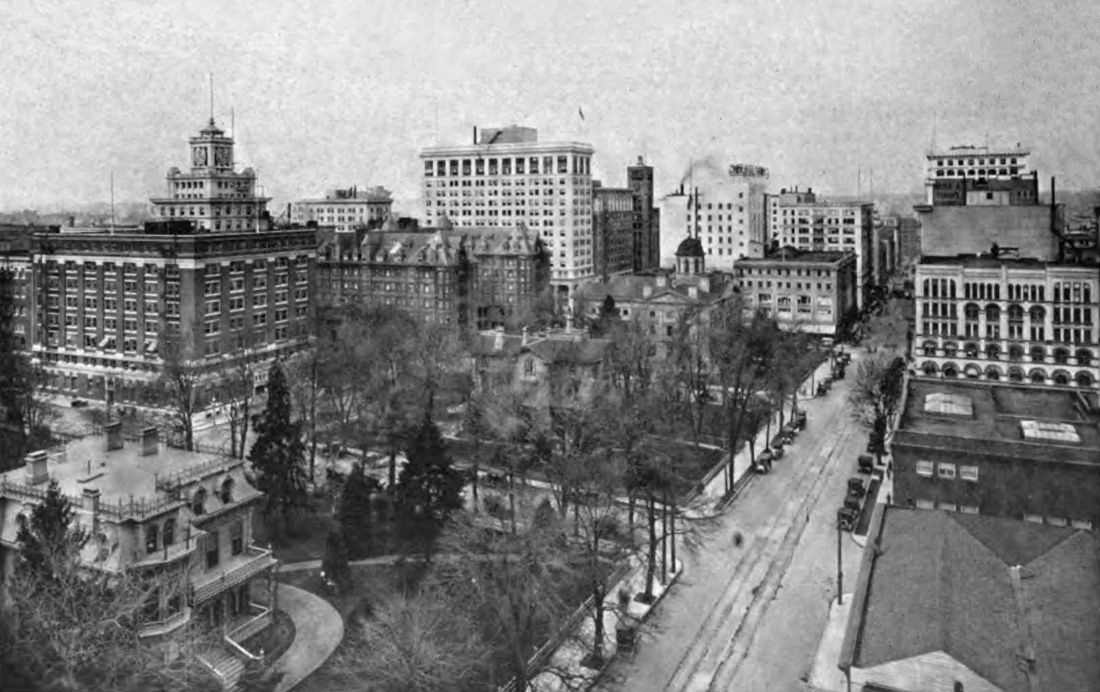
Failing's home, at the lower left in this circa 1914 photo, was located in what is now the center of downtown Portland. At the time of the house's construction (1876), the city's business center was located farther east.

Following his second term as mayor, Failing returned his attention to business. The First National Bank was the first bank established in Oregon (1866) under the National Banking Act, and for a number of years the only one west of the Rocky Mountains. Failing and Henry Corbett purchased nearly all its stock in 1869, and Failing became the bank's president, retaining that title until his death. The bank prospered under their joint management, becoming one of the most successful banks in the northwestern United States. Failing maintained an interest in other business enterprises, and held valuable real estate both in and on the outskirts of Portland.

In 1871 Henry W. Corbett and Henry Failing amalgamated their hardware and machinery businesses as Corbett, Failing & Co., and two of Failing's younger brothers (Edward Failing, a partner in H.W. Corbett & Co., and James from the Failing business side) also became partners in the new business at the same time. The new business Corbett, Failing & Co. turned exclusively to wholesale merchandizing, and became the largest of its kind in the northwest.

In the 1880s, Failing was among the key early investors in Henry Villard's Portland Hotel. Failing was elected a director of Oregon Railway and Navigation Company (ORNC) in June 1888, along with Corbett, Henry Villard, Christopher Meyer, John Hubert Hall, Sidney Dillon, Charles S. Colby, Colgate Hoyt, C. H. Lewis, W. S. Ladd, Cyrus A. Dolph, William H. Holcomb, and S. B. Wiley. Contemporary elections for the Oregon and Transcontinental and the Northern Pacific Terminal Company installed many of the same men on the boards of those companies as well (the latter company was to build Portland Union Station). The elections were understood to signal no change at ORNC, underscoring their intent to extend the Farmington Line to the Coeur D'Alene Mines, and were viewed as a defeat of Villard and his initiative to jointly lease property of the Northern Pacific and the Union Pacific.

== Later life and legacy ==
Both houses of the Oregon Legislative Assembly endorsed Failing to succeed William Windom as the U.S. secretary of the treasury in 1891. President Benjamin Harrison, however, appointed Charles Foster, a former governor of Ohio, to the post.

Failing served as a regent of the University of Oregon, a trustee and treasurer of Pacific University, president (and benefactor) of the Portland Library Association, treasurer of the Portland Children's Home, and a founder of River View Cemetery. Henry Failing died on November 8, 1898. Failing Street in Northeast Portland carries the family's name.

== See also ==
- Failing Office Building

Preceded by David Logan	Mayor of Portland, Oregon; 1864–1865	Succeeded by Thomas J. Holmes
Preceded by Philip Wasserman	Mayor of Portland, Oregon; 1873–1875	Succeeded by J. A. Chapman
