= David P. Thompson =

American politician (1834–1901)

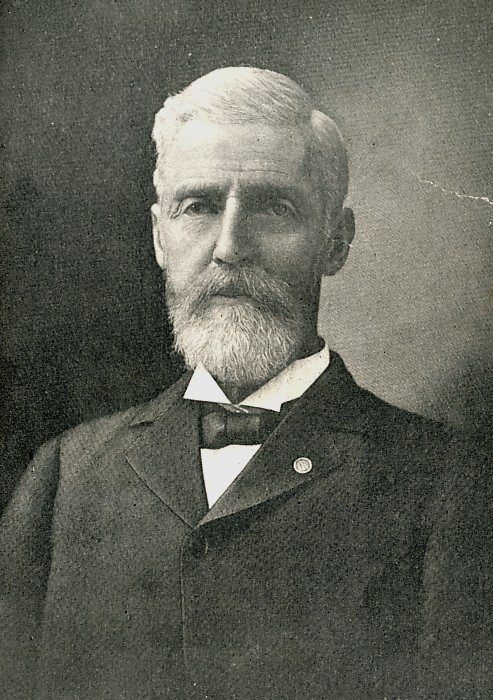

5th United States Envoy Extraordinary and Minister Plenipotentiary to the Ottoman Empire
- In office 1892–1893
- Preceded by: Solomon Hirsch
- Succeeded by: Alexander W. Terrell

24th Mayor of Portland, Oregon
- In office 1879–1882
- Preceded by: William Spencer Newbury
- Succeeded by: J. A. Chapman

6th Governor of Idaho Territory
- In office 1875–1876
- Preceded by: Thomas W. Bennett
- Succeeded by: Mason Brayman

Member of the Oregon State Senate
- In office 1868–1870

Personal details
- Born: November 8, 1834 Cadiz, Ohio, U.S.
- Died: December 14, 1901 (aged 67) Portland, Oregon, U.S.
- Party: Republican; Democratic
- Spouse: Mary R. Meldrum
- Profession: Businessman

David Preston Thompson (November 8, 1834 – December 14, 1901) was an American businessman and politician in the Pacific Northwest. He was governor of the Idaho Territory from 1875 to 1876. A native of Ohio, he immigrated to the Oregon Territory in 1853. In Oregon, Thompson would become a wealthy business man, and served in the Oregon Legislative Assembly, as both a Republican and a Democrat, both before and after his time in Idaho, with election to both chambers of the legislature.

During the American Civil War he joined the United States Army, but remained in Oregon and did not see any action. In his later years, the father of three served as mayor of Portland, Oregon, and as United States minister to the Ottoman Empire. A Republican for most of his political career, he was a presidential elector for the party, and in 1890 was its candidate for Governor of Oregon. Thompson Elk Fountain, a statue and fountain in the middle of Main Street in downtown Portland, was donated by him to the city, and a city park in Northeast Portland is named in his honor.

== Early life ==
David Thompson was born on November 8, 1834, in Cadiz, Ohio. His parents, Joseph Thompson and Betsey Thompson, were of Irish and Scottish descent. Early in his life he was an apprentice blacksmith and later a surveyor for railroad lines. In 1853 at the age of 19, Thompson moved to the Oregon Territory while herding sheep across the Oregon Trail for Colonel R. R. Thompson.

== Oregon ==
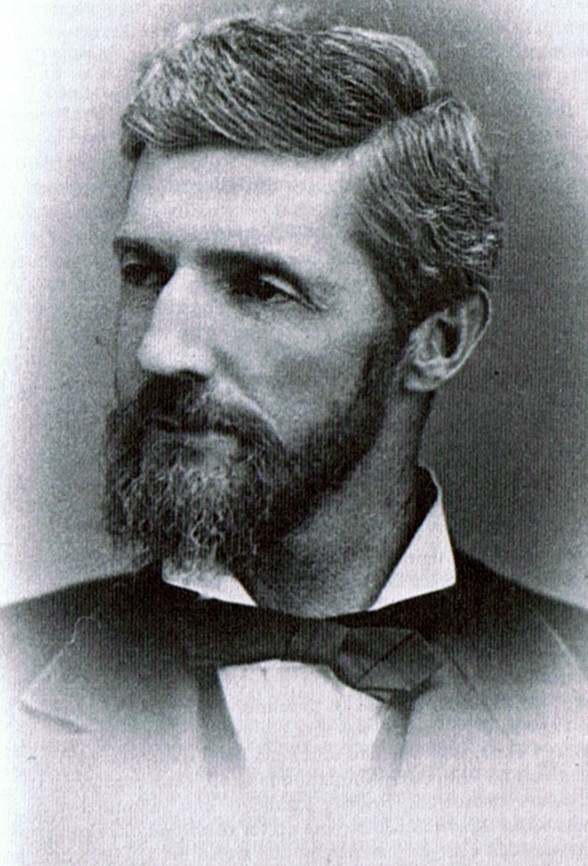
David Preston Thompson

In Oregon, he helped build the a railroad around Willamette Falls near Oregon City, which was the first railroad in Oregon. He was then appointed as a deputy surveyor for the United States to survey public lands in both the Oregon and Washington territories, serving until 1863. With the outbreak of the American Civil War in 1861 Thompson enlisted in the United States Army where he rose to the rank of captain in the First Oregon Cavalry. Due to the distance between engagements in the east and Oregon, the unit never saw action in the war. Later Thompson engaged in various business interests including mining, railroads (including the Oregon Railway and Navigation Company), banking, and manufacturing.

== Politics ==
In 1868, Thompson served in the Oregon State Senate representing district 3 and Clackamas County as a Republican. At the next session in 1870 he served as a Democrat representing district 16 and Multnomah County. In 1874, he was appointed by President Ulysses S. Grant as the governor of Idaho Territory, beginning service in 1875. While governor Thompson oversaw several mail contracts, he maintained his residence in Oregon and made only brief trips to Idaho Territory. He resigned the post, at Grant's request, in the summer of 1876.

In 1878, he returned to the Oregon Legislature as a Republican representing Multnomah County. He was elected Mayor of Portland on June 16, 1879, and reelected June 20, 1881, serving until 1882. In 1884, Thompson was a presidential elector for the Republican Party and Rutherford B. Hayes. After an absence from that body he was elected again and served there in 1889. In 1890 he was the Republican nominee for Oregon Governor, but lost the election. Then in 1892 President Benjamin Harrison appointed Thompson as United States minister to the Ottoman Empire where he served until resigning in 1893.

== Family and later life ==
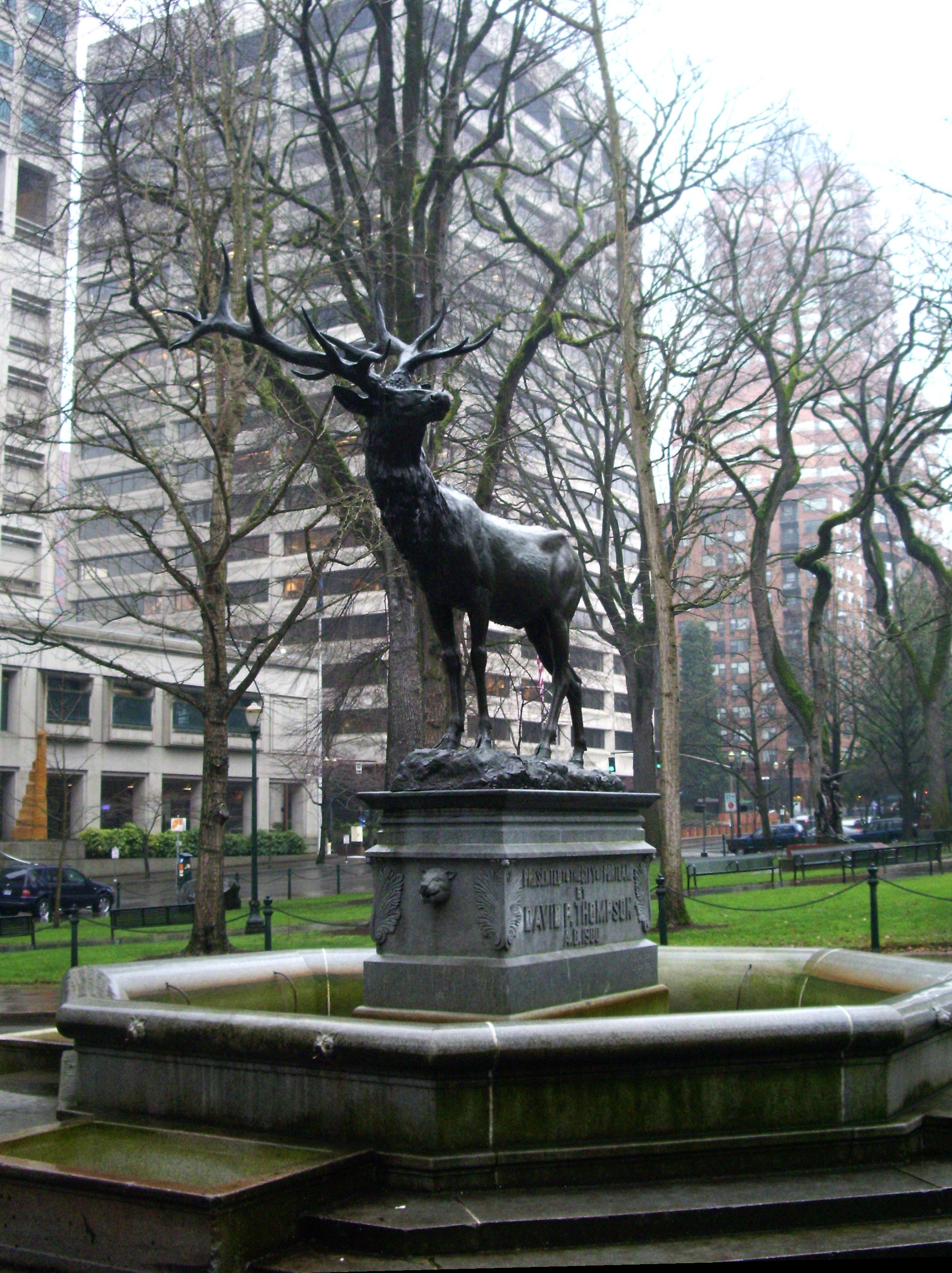
Thompson Fountain was donated to the City of Portland by David P. Thompson.

In 1861, Thompson married Mary R. Meldrum with whom he would father three children: Bessie, Genevieve, and Ralph. Thompson served as a regent to the University of Oregon and as president of the Oregon Humane Society. In 1891, the Portland Public Library was founded, with Thompson serving as its first president. He donated a fountain to the city of Portland that is downtown, and after his death his family donated a statue by the sculptor Herman A. MacNeil named Coming of the White Man that stands in Washington Park. The fountain, called Thompson Elk Fountain, is located in the middle of Main Street in the Plaza Blocks downtown, designed by sculptor Roland Hinton Perry. On July 2, 2020, the elk statue was separated from the fountain and removed for safekeeping after the granite fountain was set on fire amid ongoing George Floyd Protests. The bronze statue itself was largely undamaged. The granite components of the fountain were deconstructed and removed to safekeeping later in July, although components were destroyed by the City in the process. In addition, Thompson Park in Northeast Portland is named in Thompson's honor. David P. Thompson died December 14, 1901, in Portland, and his cremated remains were interred at River View Cemetery.

Party political offices
Preceded by Thomas R. Cornelius	Republican nominee for Governor of Oregon; 1890	Succeeded by William Paine Lord
Preceded by William Spencer Newbury	Mayor of Portland, Oregon; 1879–1881	Succeeded by J. A. Chapman
