= William W. Page =

American judge

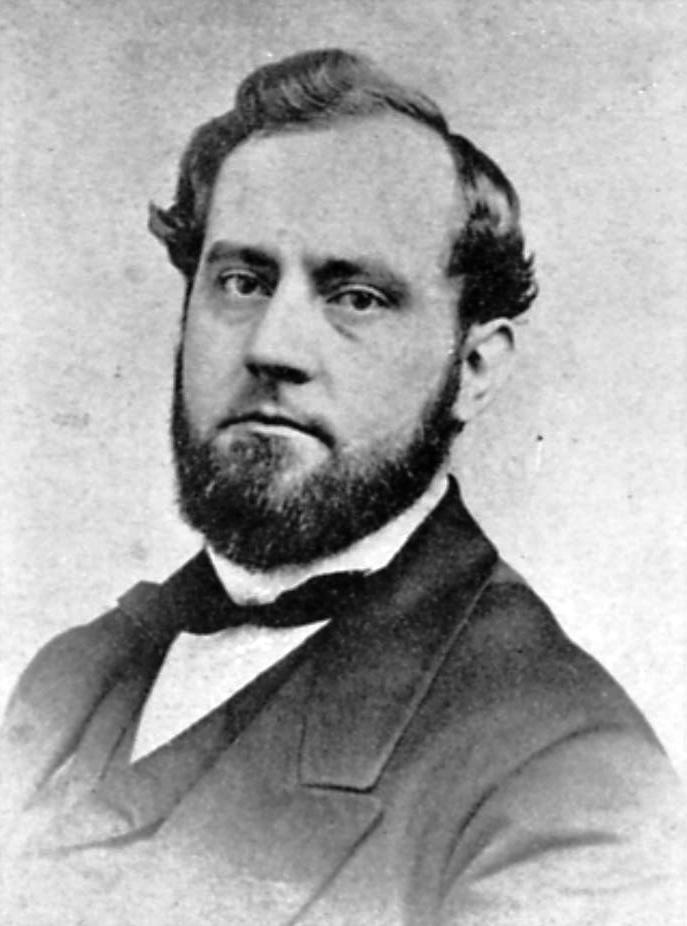

13th Justice of the Oregon Supreme Court
- In office 1862–1862
- Preceded by: Aaron E. Waite
- Succeeded by: Erasmus D. Shattuck

Personal details
- Born: December 4, 1836 Amherst, Virginia
- Died: April 12, 1897 (aged 60) Portland, Oregon
- Spouse: Albina Victoria Amireux

William Wilmer Page (December 4, 1836 – April 12, 1897) was an American attorney and judge in the state of Oregon. A native of Virginia, he served as the 13th justice of the Oregon Supreme Court for four months in 1862 to finish the term of Aaron E. Waite.

== Early life ==
William Page was born on December 4, 1836, in Virginia. The son of the Reverend Charles Page, he graduated from Miami University's law school in the state of Ohio. He then practiced law in Chicago, Illinois in 1855.

== Oregon ==
In 1857, Page traveled to Oregon Territory over the Oregon Trail. He arrived in Oregon City and was soon admitted to the state bar by Oregon Supreme Court justice Matthew Deady. Then in 1862 justice Waite resigned from the State Supreme Court to run for Congress. William Page was then appointed to fill Wait's remaining term on the bench by Oregon Governor John Whiteaker in May. The term ended in September 1862 and Page left the court. After his time on the state's highest court, Page moved to Portland, Oregon where he continued to practice law until his death on April 12, 1897. The city of Albina, Oregon was laid out with a plat for the new town filed April 1873 by Page, Edwin Russell and George Williams. The town was named after Page's daughter, Albina.
