= Bernard Goldsmith =

American politician

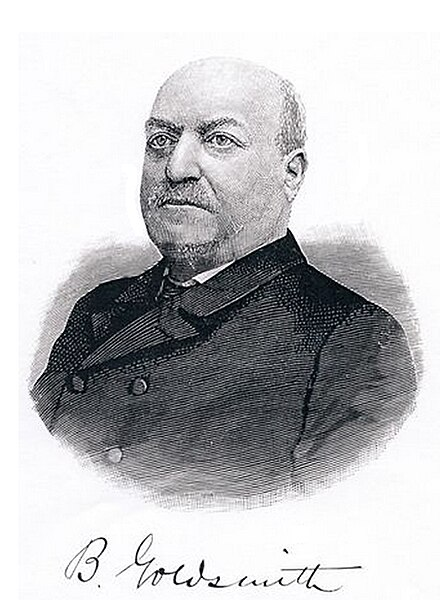

19th Mayor of Portland, Oregon
- In office 1869–1871
- Preceded by: Hamilton Boyd
- Succeeded by: Philip Wasserman

Personal details
- Born: November 20, 1832 Munich, Bavaria
- Died: July 22, 1901 (aged 68) Portland, Oregon, U.S.
- Party: Democratic (1854–1861); Republican (1861–1901)
- Profession: Businessman, politician

Bernard Goldsmith (November 20, 1832 – July 22, 1901) was a Bavarian-American businessman and politician. He is best remembered as the 19th mayor of Portland, Oregon, serving from 1869 to 1871, and as the first Jew to hold that position.

== Biography ==
=== Early years ===
Bernard Goldsmith was born November 20, 1832, in Munich, Kingdom of Bavaria. He emigrated to New York City with his brother Solomon at the age of 15, working in the city as an apprentice to a watchmaker.

Goldsmith subsequently came west, working for a time in California as a stevedore before opening his own jewelry store.

=== Business life ===
Goldsmith's jewelry store prospered, and he expanded his business interests, opening three stores in Northern California and Southern Oregon. He moved to Portland in 1861, where he opened a mercantile store together with some of his seven brothers. He also began to engage in speculative investments, playing the currency market, speculating on wheat and cattle, and investing in Idaho mines.

In 1864, Goldsmith became one of the original directors of the Library Association of Portland, founded in that year. Goldsmith was also a backer of the Willamette River Navigation Company, as well as the Willamette Falls Locks and Canal Company, which was responsible for building the Willamette Falls Locks. He was one of twelve founding members of the elite Portland Stock and Exchange Board in 1865.

These commercial ventures proved successful. By the time he was elected mayor in 1869, Goldsmith was the eighth-richest resident of Portland and was regarded as the "most prosperous Jew in Oregon."

=== Political career ===
Goldsmith was a Democrat before the Civil War, then shifted to the Republican party in opposition to slavery and in support of Abraham Lincoln, following the national pattern. He ran for mayor on the Union (Republican) ticket, then switched back to the Democratic party in 1875.

Goldsmith was Portland's first Jewish mayor and was among the first Jewish mayors in the United States. He was part of a group of successful early Jews in Portland who exhibited a strong sense of public responsibility and appetite for public life, along with another of Portland's early mayors, Philip Wasserman.

Goldsmith's accomplishments include adding downtown park blocks and public squares to the city's domain, and in 1871, purchasing 40 wooded acres in the hills above downtown Portland, which would become the nucleus of what is now Washington Park. The $32,000 price drew considerable criticism. Goldsmith was the driving force behind the building of locks to navigate around the Willamette River falls across from Oregon City, which allowed boats to travel from the Pacific Ocean to Eugene, Oregon, cutting the cost of shipping Willamette Valley goods to Portland by half. Goldsmith and his associates obtained a $200,000 legislative grant from the state of Oregon for the project; when cost estimates more than doubled, Goldsmith paid an additional $200,000 out of his pocket.

=== Later life, death, and legacy ===
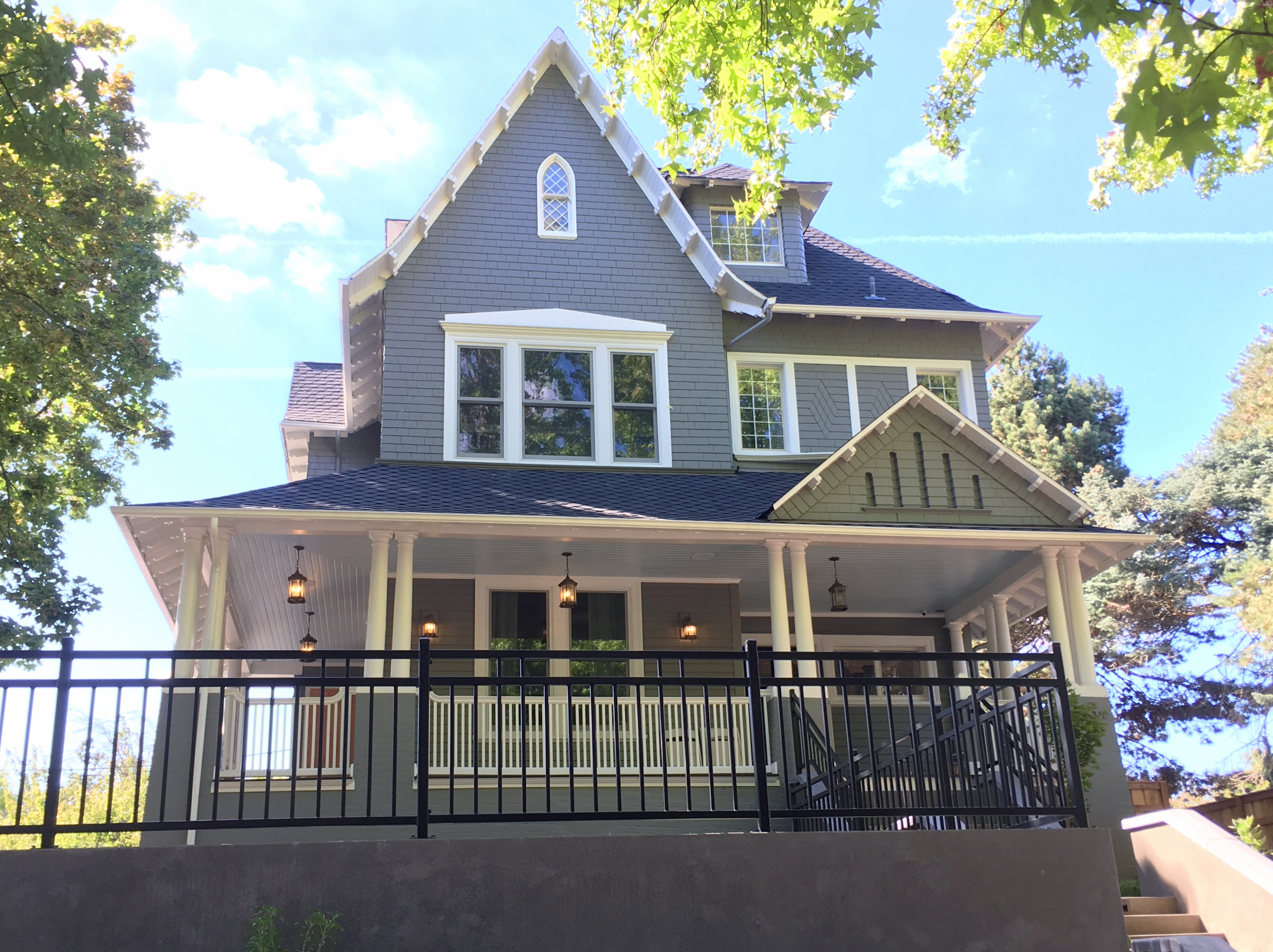
The Bernard and Emma Goldsmith House, Portland, Oregon

Bernard Goldsmith died at age 68 on July 22, 1901. His term of office has been memorialized as "one of the more successful in Portland history" by Oregon historian E. Kimbark MacColl.

Goldsmith's Portland shingle-style residence, designed by architect Edgar M. Lazarus and completed in 1892, was added to the National Register of Historic Places in 2018.

== Footnotes ==
Preceded by Hamilton Boyd	Mayor of Portland, Oregon; 1869–1871	Succeeded by Philip Wasserman
