= Thomas J. Holmes =

Mayor of Portland, Oregon

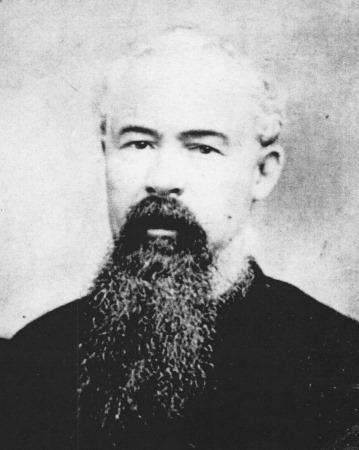

16th Mayor of Portland, Oregon
- In office 1866–1867
- Preceded by: Henry Failing
- Succeeded by: J. A. Chapman

Personal details
- Born: c. 1819 Suffolk, England
- Died: June 18, 1867 (aged 47–48) Portland, Oregon, U.S.
- Party: Democrat

Thomas J. Holmes (c. 1819 – June 18, 1867) was the mayor of Portland, Oregon, United States from 1866 to 1867. He was born in Suffolk, England, and emigrated to the United States in 1830. He lived in New Jersey until 1852, when he moved west to California and, later the same year, to Oregon. He served on the Portland Public Schools board from 1862–1866. Following the resignation of Mayor Henry Failing, Holmes was chosen to succeed him as mayor by a vote of the city council on December 1, 1866.

Thomas Holmes died at his Portland home of a stroke on June 18, 1867, only one day after being elected to a full term as mayor.

His son, Byron Z. Holmes (1847 – November 23, 1903), was elected to the Oregon Legislature in 1876 and was a "prominent citizen" and businessman in Portland.

Preceded by Henry Failing	Mayor of Portland, Oregon; 1866–1867	Succeeded by J. A. Chapman
