= Philip Wasserman =

American politician

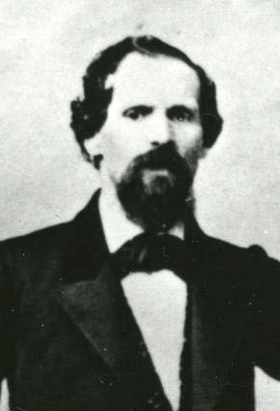

20th Mayor of Portland, Oregon
- In office 1871–1873
- Preceded by: Bernard Goldsmith
- Succeeded by: Henry Failing

Personal details
- Born: December 1828 Kingdom of Bavaria
- Died: February 26, 1895 (aged 66) Portland, Oregon, U.S.
- Party: Republican
- Profession: Banker, politician

Philip Wasserman (December 1828 – February 26, 1895) was the mayor of Portland, Oregon, United States from 1871 to 1873. He was a pioneer banker and co-founder of the First National Bank.

Wasserman moved to Portland from San Francisco in 1858 and entered the tobacco and cigar business with his brother, Herman. He was part of a group of successful early Jews in Portland who exhibited a strong sense of public responsibility and appetite for public life, along with his predecessor (and Portland's first Jewish mayor), Bernard Goldsmith.

He died of heart failure at his home in Portland on February 26, 1895.

Preceded by Bernard Goldsmith	Mayor of Portland, Oregon; 1871–1873	Succeeded by Henry Failing
