= George W. Vaughn =

American politician

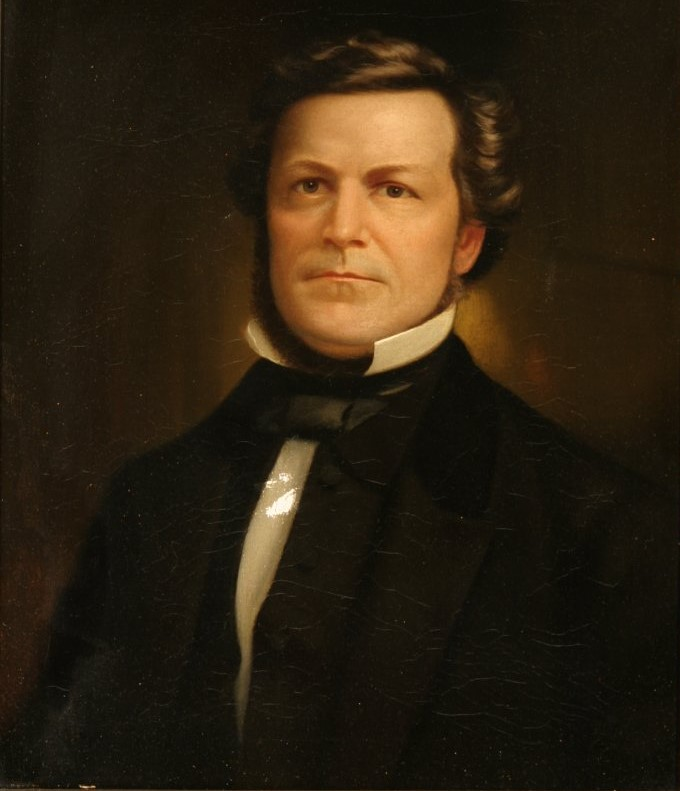
- A portrait of Vaughn by Theodore Gegoux

6th Mayor of Portland, Oregon
- In office 1855–1856
- Preceded by: William S. Ladd
- Succeeded by: James O'Neill

Personal details
- Born: 1809 Blairstown, New Jersey, United States
- Died: March 1877

George W. Vaughn (1809 – March 1877) served as mayor of Portland, Oregon, from 1855 to 1856. Born in 1809 in Blairstown, New Jersey, he moved to Portland in 1850.

Preceded by William S. Ladd	Mayor of Portland, Oregon; 1855–1856	Succeeded by James O'Neill
