= James O'Neill (Washington politician) =

American politician (1826–1901)

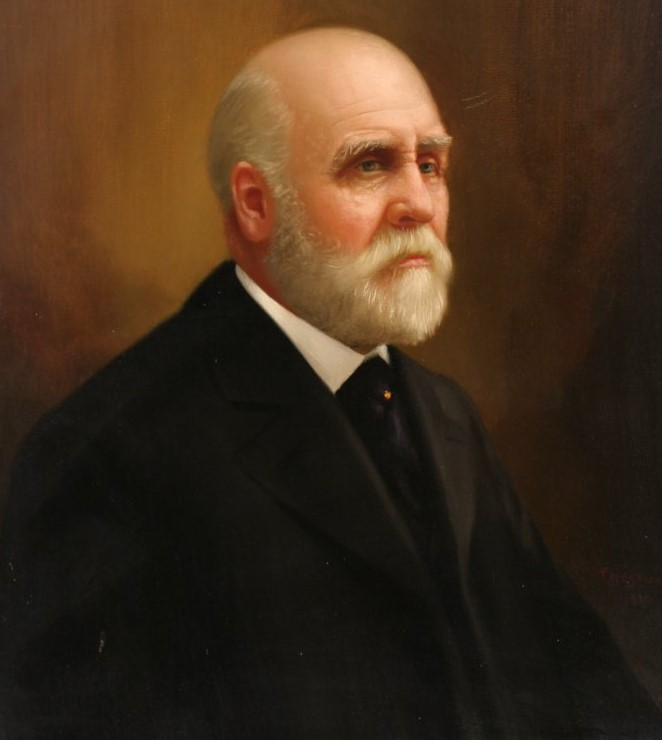
- A portrait of O'Neil by Theodore Gegoux

Member of the Washington Senate from the 2nd district
- In office January 7, 1891 – January 14, 1895
- Preceded by: Alexander Watt
- Succeeded by: Willard B. Field

7th Mayor of Portland, Oregon
- In office 1856–1857
- Preceded by: George W. Vaughn
- Succeeded by: William S. Ladd

Personal details
- Born: February 9, 1826 Duanesburg, New York, U.S.
- Died: July 21, 1901 (aged 75) Spokane, Washington, U.S.
- Party: Republican
- Spouse: Caroline M. Grinnell

James O'Neill (February 9, 1826 – July 21, 1901) was an American businessman and politician in the Oregon Territory and the territory and state of Washington. A New York native, he was mayor of Portland, Oregon, and an Indian Agent in Idaho and Washington territories. He later served in the legislatures of the Washington Territory and the State of Washington.

== Early life ==
O'Neill was born in Duanesburg, New York, in 1824 or 1826. He was the oldest of five children born to James E. O'Neill and the former Elizabeth Marsh. Of Irish descent, his father was a shopkeeper in Schenectady County, New York, where the younger James was born. James was educated in the local public schools as well as the academies in Gallupville and Albany.

After receiving his education he worked in his father store for a time before moving to Albany where he worked as a store clerk. From 1849 to 1851 he was in business for himself in Albany, and in 1851 he moved to New York City and continued his business until 1853. He married Caroline M. Grinnell of New York in 1849, and they had one daughter, Kate. Caroline died in 1871.

== Oregon ==
In 1853, O'Neill moved to the Oregon Territory, traveling by ship to Panama where he then traveled by land across the Isthmus. He then continued by ship to Oregon. In Oregon, he settled in Oregon City where he worked as an agent for Wells Fargo & Company until 1857. A few years after arriving he moved across the Willamette River to Portland. A Whig Party supporter, he attended that party's first Oregon convention in 1855 in Corvallis.

On April 7, 1856, O'Neill was elected as the seventh mayor of Portland, replacing George W. Vaughn. He was re-elected the next year, becoming the city's first two-term mayor, but was replaced on November 4, 1857, by William S. Ladd before the end of his second term. In 1858, O'Neill returned to New York briefly, and then returned to Portland as a merchant, remaining until 1861. He switched political allegiance to the Republican Party when that party was formed . His brother, Captain Daniel O'Neill (born 1826) was a steamship captain in Oregon.

== Idaho and Washington ==
In 1863, he was working as an interpreter for the Office of Indian Affairs in the Idaho Territory. O'Neill worked out of Lapwai and in 1865 was working as an Indian agent for the Nez Perce Agency in Idaho. He continued in that position through 1867. He then moved to Cheweela on the Colville Indian Reservation and continued working for the Office of Indian Affairs. From 1868 until 1878 he was back in New York.

O'Neill returned to Washington in 1878 and worked as a farmer for the Coeur d'Alene Tribe. He kept that position until resigning in 1887. During this time he also served as postmaster for Chewelah, while in 1881 he served in the Washington Territorial House of Representatives of the Washington Territory representing Spokane and Stevens counties. While in the House he worked to pass the bill incorporating the city of Spokane Falls (now Spokane) in 1881.

In 1888, O'Neill was elected as auditor for Stevens County, serving for two years. James O'Neill was elected to the Washington State Senate in 1889 when Washington became a state. He represented the Second District, made up of Spokane and Stevens counties and served as chairman of the mines committee and of the Indian Affairs committee. In 1892, he served as a delegate to the Seattle Convention.

He died on July 21, 1901, in Spokane, Washington, and was buried in Fairmount Cemetery.

Preceded by George W. Vaughn	Mayor of Portland, Oregon; 1856–1857	Succeeded by William S. Ladd
