= S. J. McCormick =

American politician

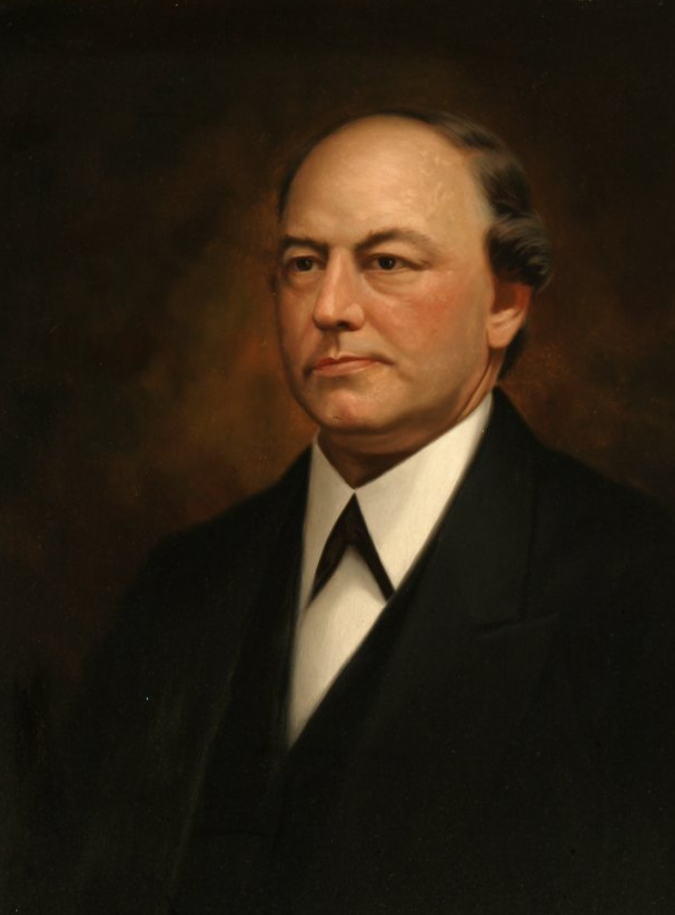
- A portrait of McCormick by Theodore Gegoux

10th Mayor of Portland, Oregon
- In office 1859–1860
- Preceded by: A. M. Starr
- Succeeded by: G. Collier Robbins

Delegate to the Oregon Constitutional Convention
- In office 1857
- Constituency: Multnomah County

Personal details
- Born: Stephen James McCormick; 26 September 1829 Dublin, Ireland
- Died: 12 August 1891 (aged 61) San Francisco, California, U.S.
- Party: Democratic
- Spouse: Annie Clark
- Profession: Printer, publisher, editor

Stephen James McCormick (1829–1891) was a prominent printer and publisher in Oregon, United States, who served as mayor of Portland, Oregon, from 1859 to 1860. He was originally from Dublin, Ireland.

He worked as a newspaper reporter in New York. He came to Portland with his wife in 1851.

In Oregon, McCormick worked as a printer and publisher. In 1852, he opened a book shop in Portland, the Franklin Book Store. He began publishing a semi-weekly newspaper, The Portland Commercial, on March 24, 1853, but it was discontinued after a short life.

He was elected as a Multnomah County delegate to the Oregon Constitutional Convention, held in 1857. He also served on the county commission and school board. He became a prominent publisher in Oregon, and his publications included the Oregon Almanac (originally known as McCormick's Almanac), Oregon Monthly Magazine, a city directory for Portland, and Abigail Scott Duniway's Captain Gray's Company (1859). In 1857, he was elected chief of the Portland Fire Department (established in 1854), serving for a brief period. He was elected mayor of Portland on April 4, 1859, for a one-year term. During and after his term as mayor, he continued working in his main occupation, publishing.

On May 13, 1859, he established another Portland newspaper, the Portland Daily Advertiser, which was only the second daily newspaper in the Pacific Northwest (the first being the Portland Daily News, which began publication less than four weeks before McCormick's Advertiser). It ceased publication – a suspension that became permanent – in October 1862. McCormick sold the paper before the start of the Civil War in 1861, the same year that The Oregonian became a daily paper. The Advertiser was pro-slavery and, according to a 1911 account by Henry Pittock, it took a pro-secession stance after the inauguration of Abraham Lincoln as U.S. President in March 1861, causing the paper to lose influence in Portland, where the majority of residents were pro-Union. It ceased publication the following year.

McCormick subsequently moved to San Francisco, California, where he became editor of the Catholic Monitor newspaper. In 1889, he wrote the book, The Pope and Ireland.

He died in San Francisco in 1891.

| Preceded by A. M. Starr | Mayor of Portland, Oregon; 1859–1860 | Succeeded by G. Collier Robbins |
