= Carriage house =

Outbuilding for the storage of horse-tack and carriages

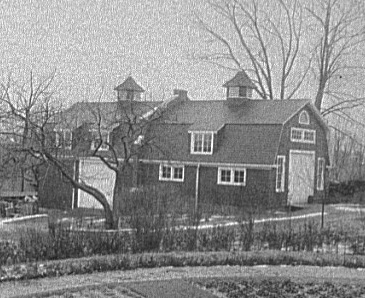
Carriage house, New York City, c. 1900

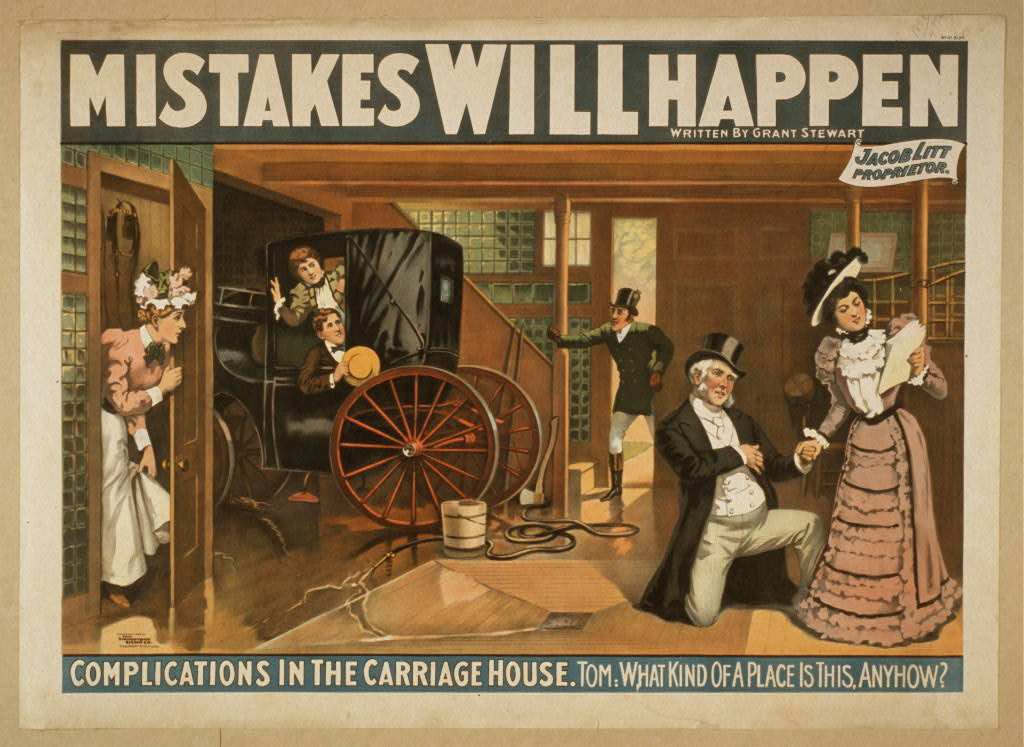
Fanciful rendering of the interior of a carriage house from a theatrical poster (1898)

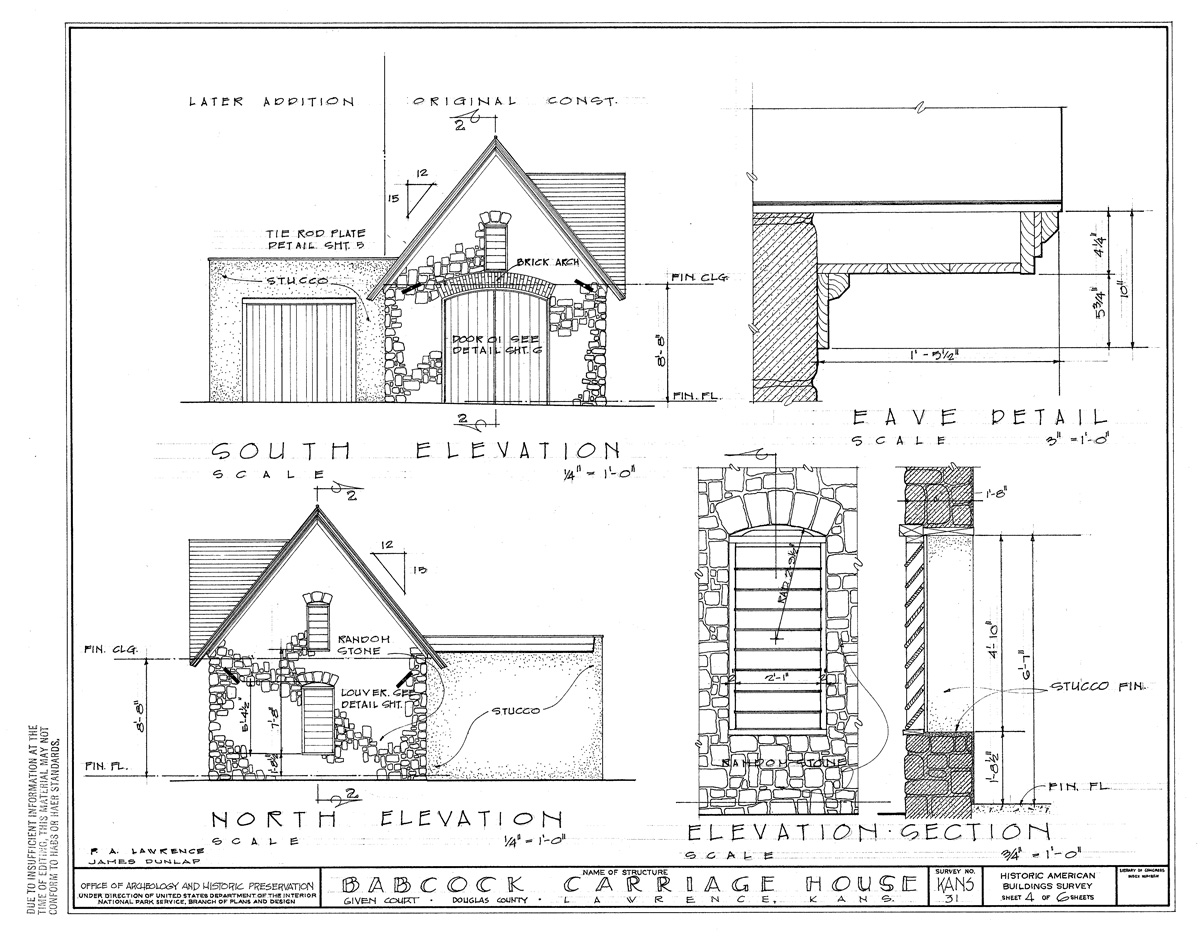
Small carriage house, Douglas County, Kansas

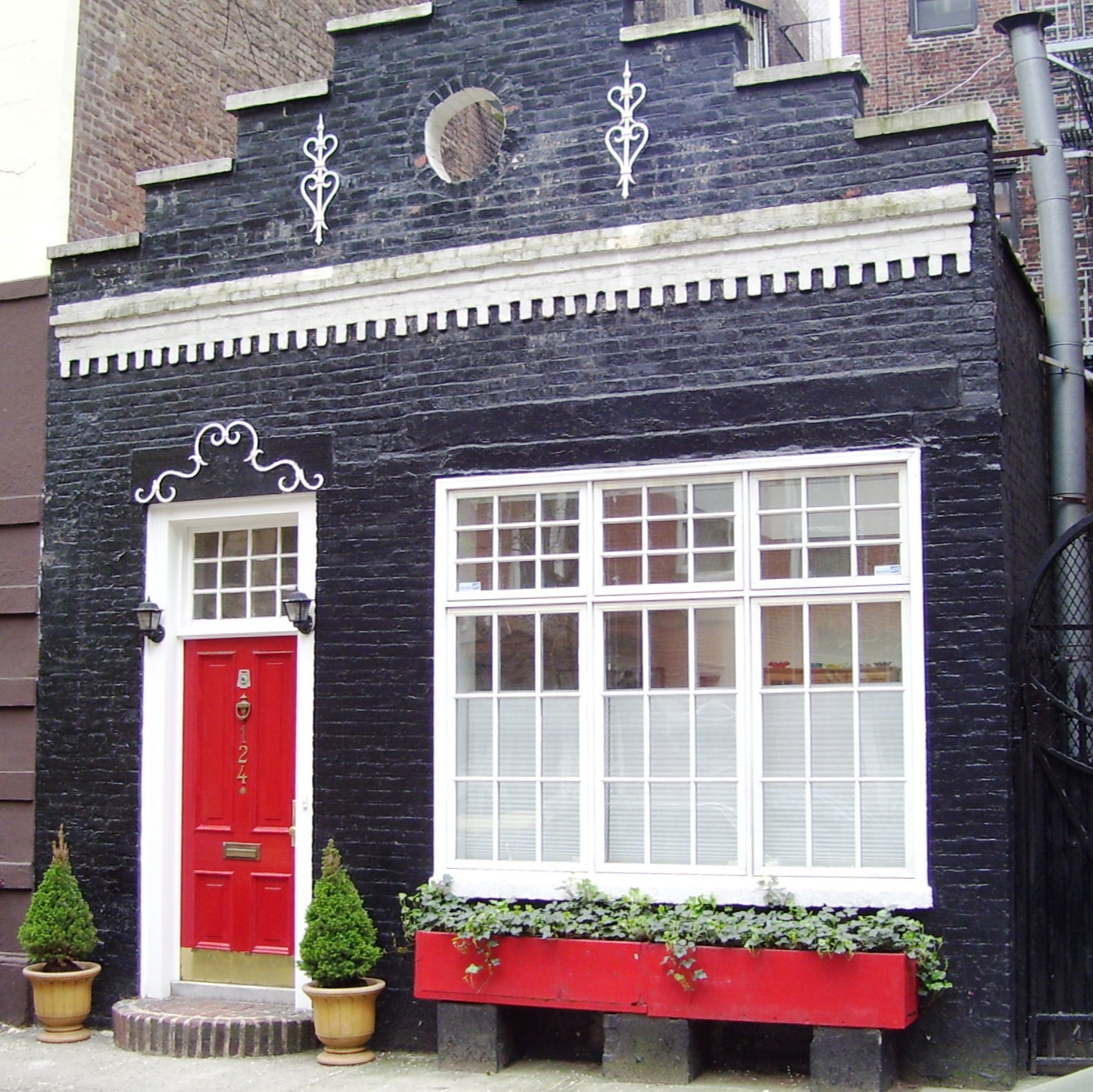
This carriage house in Manhattan has been made over into a single-family home

A carriage house, also called a remise or coach house, is a term used in the United States and Canada to describe an outbuilding that was originally built to house horse-drawn carriages and their related tack. Carriage houses were often two stories, with related staff quarters above.

== Current usages ==
In modern usage, the term "carriage house" has taken on several additional, somewhat overlapping meanings:

- Buildings that were originally true carriage houses that have been converted to other uses such as secondary suites, apartments, guest houses, automobile garages, offices, workshops, retail shops, bars, restaurants, or storage buildings.
- Purpose-built secondary homes, also called accessory dwelling units or detached dwelling units, on the same lot as a primary residence. They have completely separate living areas and facilities, sometimes in the style of converted carriage houses. Some municipalities, such as Ottawa and Ontario, Canada, have introduced regulations permitting coach houses to intensify use of urban residential space and increase affordability and possibilities for multi-generational housing in low-density areas, whereas the American state of California revised state laws to limit local governments' authority to restrict ADU construction and reduce cost and bureaucracy hurdles in order to ease the shortage of housing.
- A marketing term for single-family homes, built on a lot just large enough for the home, and often sharing in common land with other homes in the same planned unit development. They are more properly called "carriage homes" or "patio homes". Some municipalities have relaxed setback restrictions for such buildings or allow "zero lot line" carriage homes, in which a wall of the home lies on the property line itself.

== Other modern uses ==
Because of the prestigious nature of some large, elaborate carriage houses, the term "carriage house" is commonly used as part of the name of businesses such as antique shops and restaurants. Sometimes these businesses are housed in former carriage houses. Property developers are now including coach houses in their portfolios. The unique architectural features and integrated space for potential car parking make it an attractive offering to many clients.

== See also ==
- Charles O. Boynton Carriage House
- Ladd Carriage House
- Pfeiffer House and Carriage House
- John G. and Minnie Gluek House and Carriage House
- Accessory dwelling unit
- Mews
