= William S. Ladd =

American politician

William Sargent Ladd
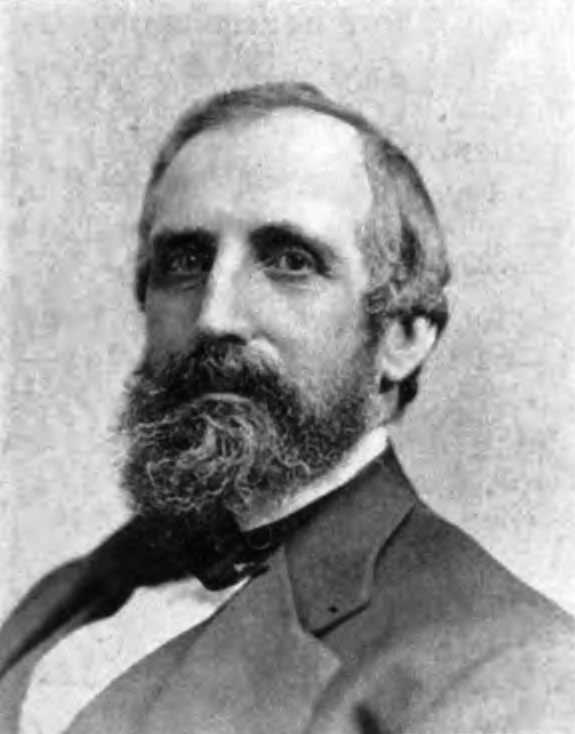
- Ladd c. 1870

5th Mayor of Portland, Oregon
- In office 1854–1855
- Preceded by: Josiah Failing
- Succeeded by: George W. Vaughn

8th Mayor of Portland, Oregon
- In office 1857–1858
- Preceded by: James O'Neill
- Succeeded by: A. M. Starr

Personal details
- Born: October 10, 1826 Holland, Vermont, U.S.
- Died: January 6, 1893 (aged 66) Portland, Oregon, U.S.
- Party: Democratic (1853–1864); Republican (1864–1893)
- Spouse(s): Caroline Ames Elliott; 1827–1909

William Sargent Ladd (October 10, 1826 – January 6, 1893) was an American politician and businessman in Oregon. He twice served as the mayor of Portland, Oregon, in the 1850s. A native of Vermont, he was a prominent figure in the early development of Portland, and co-founded the first bank in the state in 1859. Ladd also built the first brick building in Portland and was a noted philanthropist. Part of his former estate, the Ladd Carriage House, is on the National Register of Historic Places.

== Early life ==
William Ladd was born to Nathaniel Gould Ladd and Abigail Kelley Mead on October 10, 1826, in Holland, Vermont. Nathaniel was of English heritage and received his education at Dartmouth College, becoming a physician, while Abigail was from New Hampshire. When William was seven years old, the family moved to Sanborton Bridge, New Hampshire, where he was educated in the local public schools and an academy. During the summers, he worked, and at age 15 his father got him a job on a farm. William later worked on the family's 58-acre (230,000 m^{2}) farm before at age 19 beginning to work as a teacher in area schools.

His father had earned his way through school, but was successful enough to pay for William to attend college. However, William decided to pay for his own way in life and did not attend college. He then began working for the Boston, Concord & Montreal Railroad at a freight house in Sanborton Bridge. Ladd received several promotions and was briefly in charge of the company's freight department before being returned to Sanborton Bridge. Disillusioned with the demotion, and spurred by reports from Samuel R. Thurston and a local shopkeeper who had returned with a large fortune, he decided to move west to work with Charles E. Tilton, a former classmate, who was involved in a mercantile business in San Francisco.

Ladd left from New York City on February 27, 1851, and sailed to San Francisco, traveling over the Isthmus of Panama. Upon arriving in San Francisco and finding the San Francisco market was overstocked, he attempted to get Tilton to partner with him in a venture to import goods to what was then the Oregon Territory. Tilton refused, due to the risk involved, so Ladd traveled north to Oregon on his own.

== Oregon Territory ==
Ladd arrived in Portland, Oregon Territory on April 8, 1851 (before Oregon became a state in 1859), traveling on Pacific Mail Steamship Company's Columbia steamer. He came with a small load of wine and liquor on consignment from Tilton, which he sold off at a small store, making $2000 in the first four months. Immediately upon arriving, Ladd went into a bar owned by Colburn Barrell, who gave Ladd a free drink and a new pair of shoes, since his only shoes were in poor condition. Barrell recalled liking Ladd immediately and soon became one of Ladd's best customers.

The day after arriving in Portland, Ladd rented a small store at 42 Front Street and sent an order to Tilton for more liquor. At that time, Portland contained six to eight saloons and retail liquor stores, with approximately 30 retail stores. One saloon had just received its first billiard table. Ladd only grossed $41.40 in the last two weeks of April and was unable to pay the $6 property tax, instead exchanging several nights and mornings to remove two stumps from the street in lieu of payment. Early May proved better for Ladd, selling a large amount of gin to Barrell, adding the local Skidmore's California House hotel and Ainsworth's Lot Whitcomb steamer as customers. Ladd began to branch out, adding eggs, chickens, and other local goods to his liquor store. He then earned $250 by selling goods from W. D. Gookin on consignment, adding shaving soap, tobacco, paper, farm tools, blasting powder to his store. In August 1851, Ladd's gross sales were $1000. In association with Gookin he continued in the mercantile business for several years.

== W. S. Ladd & Company ==
In 1852 Ladd entered a silent partnership with Tilton. and Ladd opened W. S. Ladd & Company in Portland, and was soon joined by his brother John Wesley Ladd. William S. Ladd handled the wholesale trade, and 'Sim', Simeon Reed was "the best dressed bartender in early day Portland."

Ladd erected the first brick building in the city in 1853, at 163 Front Street.

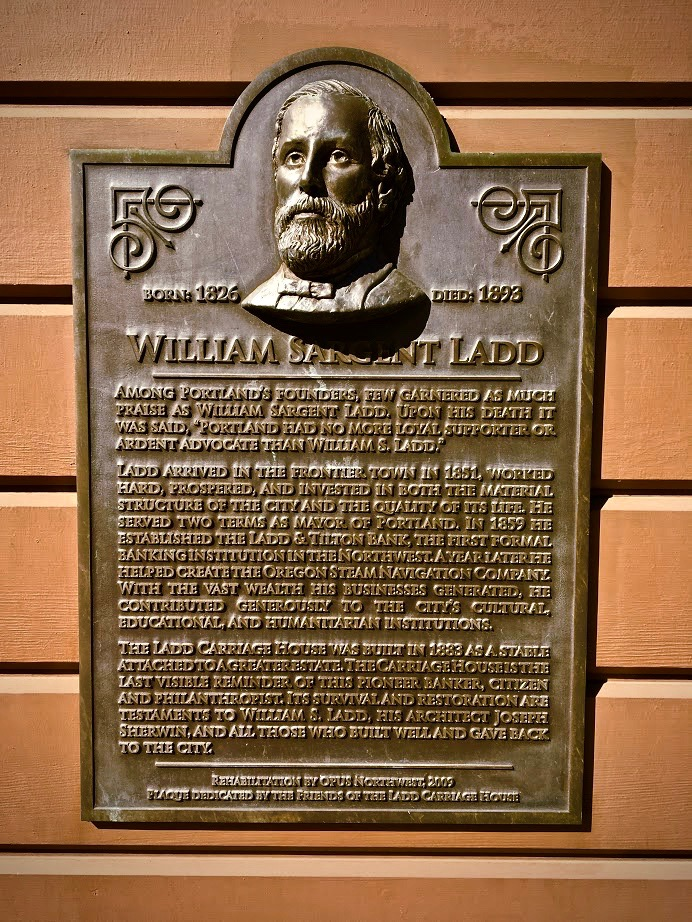
William S. Ladd plaque Ladd Carriage House (Gretchen Forster photo 2018)

In 1855, Ladd bought out Tilton, with Tilton returning east. Ladd then made his brother a partner in his firm. In 1858, Tilton returned and shortly after re-joined Ladd as a silent partner.

== Oregon becomes a state and Ladd branches out ==
Oregon Territory became Oregon state February 14, 1859. (Note: Adjoining to the south, California had become a state on September 9, 1850. Adjoining to the north, Washington Territory became Washington state November 11, 1889.)

Tilton would retire and leave the W.S. Ladd & Company partnership in 1880. The company later become Ladd, Reed & Co. when Simeon Gannett Reed joined the business. Reed's wife Amanda had accompanied the future Mrs. Ladd out West and the future Reed couple were to meet through Ladd.

== The Ladd and Tilton Bank ==
W.S. Ladd with Tilton founded the Ladd and Tilton Bank, the first bank in Oregon, in April 1859. Tilton left the running of it to Ladd. Under him it grew into a substantial enterprise, although Oregon did not have banking laws and regulations until 1907 and W. S. Ladd ran it without a board but invested its money in many successful enterprises during his lifetime. (Note: The Ladd & Tilton bank was ultimately sold in 1924 to the US National Bank, after W.S. Ladd's death, during the tenure of his son William M. Ladd as president, when the bank was controlled by his brother-in-law Frederic B. Pratt.)

In 1867, Ladd along with Asahel Bush founded the Ladd and Bush Bank in Salem, Oregon. Ten years later Bush would buy out Ladd and become the sole proprietor of the financial institution. MacColl states that Ladd was equally generous and miserly, a conservative investor, and an adventurous and speculative trader. Specifically, "he created his vast real estate holdings out of forfeited mortgages and defaulted loans."

== Other businesses ==
William Ladd and Simeon Reed would also partner in a variety of ventures, including a hobby farm where Reedville, Oregon now stands.

Over the years Ladd would be a major player in the early economic development of Portland. Investments or promotions included:

- The Oregon Steam Navigation Company formed in 1862 with Ladd as the second biggest investor, and Reed investing as well.
- The Oregon Telegraph Company in 1862.
- The Oregon Iron Company in 1864.
- The Oregon Central Railroad Company in 1866.
- The Idaho Telegraph Company in 1868.
- The Oregon Furniture Manufacturing Company in 1874.
- The Portland Flouring Mills Company in 1883.
- The Portland Hotel in 1887.
- The Portland Cordage Company in 1888.

Ladd was also involved with agriculture. He owned farm land in Multnomah County and neighboring Washington and Clark counties, notably Ladd Hill in what is now Clackamas County. He imported cattle, thoroughbred horses, hogs, and sheep for his Broad Mead farm and his other farms in order to improve the bloodlines and breeds in Oregon.

In 1891, Ladd platted what became Ladd's Addition in what is now Southeast Portland. The Addition has a criss-crossed street layout, and had parks and utilities, and was annexed into Portland that year along with the rest of East Portland.

== Politics ==
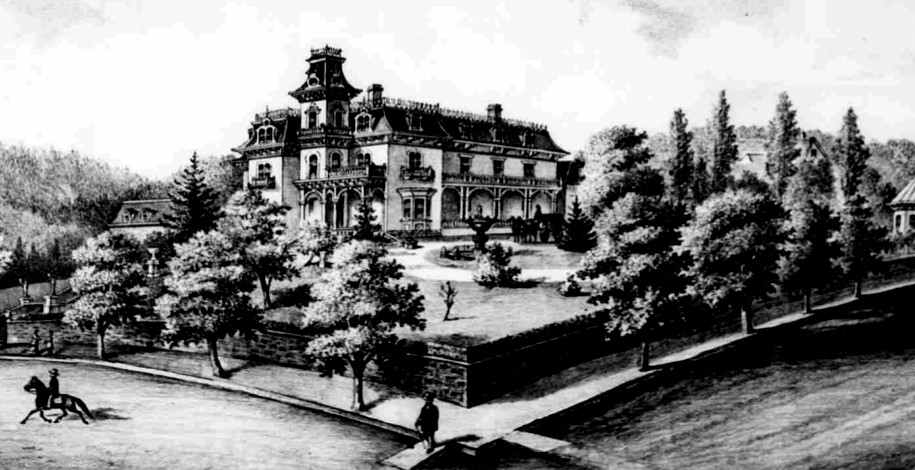
Ladd's house c. 1881

In 1853 and again in 1856, Ladd served on the city council in Portland. He served as fifth mayor of the city, serving from March 15, 1854, to April 1, 1855. He served again as the eighth mayor from 1857 to 1858 (at the time by convention the mayors held office for one year terms).
In 1886, he was a member of the city's water commission.
Originally a Democrat, he became a Republican in 1864 when he supported Abraham Lincoln's re-election.

== Educational institutions and philanthropy ==
Education was one of Ladd's lifelong interests. Some of the educational and charitable initiatives he was involved in reflect this.

- In 1854, when he was mayor, he and two of the other Portland merchants, who with him were to make important contributions to education in Oregon, Josiah Failing, the immediate past mayor and Henry W. Corbett were responsible for the establishment of a tax funded Portland public school system. Three years after the trio had arrived in Portland, they together paid for a notice in the fledgling city's new newspaper The Oregonian that called for a public meeting on December 7, 1854, to seek agreement from the taxpayers for the founding of a public school. The first public school building Central School was opened on May 17, 1858. (Note: The school was erected at cost of $7,000 (including $1000 for the land).) By that summer 280 pupils had been enrolled. It was located on the block where the Portland Hotel was later built and now the site of Pioneer Courthouse Square.
- He served on the Portland Public Schools board from 1854 to 1856, 1865 to 1868 and 1875 to 1876.
- Ladd was one of the first people to contribute funds toward the creation of the Portland Library fund (now the Multnomah County Library) and for 22 years gave it space at an annual rent of one dollar on the second floor in the Ladd and Tilton Bank, above the banking floor, (Note: "At the Association's annual meeting in February 1869, W. S. Ladd presented it with a gift from the Ladd & Tilton Bank: a three-year lease for a suite of rooms on the second floor of the bank's new building at the south west corner of First and Stark streets. The rent – one dollar a year!" This arrangement was to continue after the initial three years for a further 19.) until a purpose-built building was opened for it built by public subscription and generous benefactors such as he. The new Portland Library Building with the Art Gallery on the second floor was opened just after his death under the presidency of Henry Failing on June 7, 1893. (Note: The new Portland Library Building occupied a half-block site on the south side of Stark Street, between Seventh Street (now Broadway) and Park street and designed by William Whidden.)
- Ladd served as the president of the board of regents at the state's agricultural college in Corvallis, now known as Oregon State University.
- He was also a trustee and one of the largest donors to Albany Collegiate Institute, the forerunner of Lewis & Clark College. His philanthropy saved the fledgling college from closing in its early years. (Note: Ladd endowed it with H. W. Corbett in Portland April 5, 1883.)
- He endowed a chair at the state's medical school in Portland (later Oregon Health & Science University).
- He endowed a scholarship at Willamette University in Salem.
- He endowed a chair at the Presbyterian's seminary in San Francisco in 1886.
- Ladd also helped to establish River View Cemetery in Portland.

== Family ==
In 1854 William arranged for his bride-to-be, Caroline Ames Elliott (March 18, 1827 – October 23, 1909), with whom he had fallen in love back in New Hampshire, to travel to San Francisco. She arrived there where Ladd met her, and they were married there on October 17, 1854. The couple arrived in Portland on November 6, 1854.

William and Caroline had five children surviving into adulthood:

- William Mead Ladd (1855–1931)
- Charles Elliott Ladd (1857–1920)
- Helen Kendall Ladd (1859–1936). Married Henry Jagger Corbett (1857–1895).
- Caroline Ames Ladd (1861–1946). Married Frederic Bayley Pratt (1865–1945).
- John Wesley Ladd (1870–1932)

(Myra Tilton Ladd (1865–1865) died as infant. Another child unnamed had died at birth in 1860).

Ladd enthusiastically supported his wife Caroline's educational, charitable, and religious works and credited his success in life to her cooperation and sympathy. Among her many charitable contributions she donated money to build the first purpose-built Portland Art Museum on land left for that purpose with a bequest from her husband's business associate Henry W. Corbett, her daughter Helen's father-in-law. (Note: Corbett donated in his will the property for the site of the first Art Museum Building together with an endowment for it. Caroline Elliott Ladd (Mrs. William S. Ladd) donated the funds for the construction of the building and the collection was installed there and it opened at SW Fifth and Taylor in 1905. The building was designed in Georgian classical style by Whidden & Lewis.)

== Residence ==
Ladd built his house and landscaped the grounds occupying the Portland city block bounded by what is now Jefferson, Broadway, Columbia and 6th Avenue. It was built in 1859, designed by E.M. Burton, the original being a two-story Italianate flat-roofed villa-style with a cupola. Ladd had ordered plans for the house after his wife, Caroline Elliott Ladd, had admired one of similar design in Concord on a trip east in 1858. Mr. and Mrs. Ladd and their growing family had moved in by Christmas 1860 after it had been fitted out with panelling and detailing shipped from the east. (Note: The 1858 trip to the East was largely to get C. E. Tilton to partner with Ladd in founding the Ladd & Tilton bank, Portland's first bank, and the Concord house was seen on their trip.)

The house was later enlarged with an extended wing and another floor added with mansard roofs in the Second Empire style with these later additions made by architect William P. Lewis. The back of the house faced what is today SW Broadway and its large two-story circular peaked greenhouse was located at the corner of Broadway and Jefferson.

The Ladd house interior was described in The Oregonian:

As the house now stands it has thirty rooms. The staircase is wide, the rooms spacious: windows reach floor to ceiling and doors are ample. Decorative woods, richly carved and inlaid, line wainscotting and mantels everywhere. Rosewood, maple and mahogany predominate. These art panels came from the east, brought in ships hold around the Horn.

The rooms were elegantly proportioned and in the music room, the woodwork was inlaid with "olive and rosewoods in an elaborate manner."

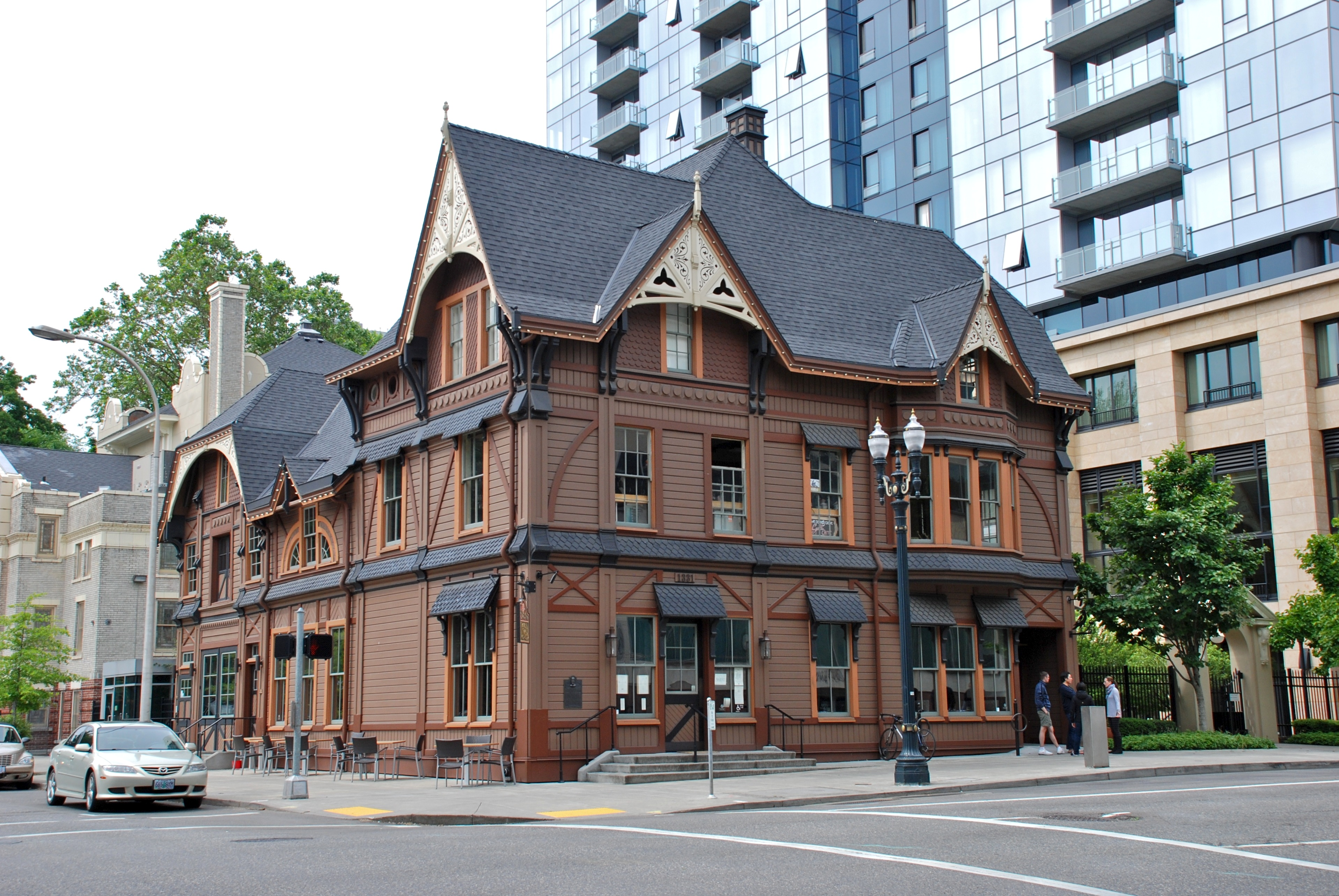
Ladd Carriage House in 2014

Ladd built the Ladd Carriage House in 1883 across the street on the corner of Columbia and Broadway for his horses and carriages and some staff quarters. The building still stands (now occupied by The Raven and Rose restaurant, next door to Ladd Tower). It is listed on the National Register of Historic Places.

The Ladd house was last occupied by William S. Ladd's daughter Helen Ladd Corbett, who was the widow of Henry Jagger Corbett, the eldest son of banker, merchant and US Senator Henry W. Corbett who he had predeceased. She moved to her parents' house in 1910 after her mother's death so her eldest son Henry Ladd Corbett could move into her previous home (the Henry Jagger Corbett family residence) on the Park Blocks in Portland. She lived as a widow in the former W. S. Ladd home until she sold it in 1926 to move to south of the Portland city limits in an area which earlier had been known as Rivera.

She sold the Ladd house and the downtown block it occupied for an intended hotel, which was never built, as the Depression began.

The Ladd house burned down while it was being dismantled after most of the fine furnishings and interior architectural details had been removed for use in Helen Ladd Corbett's new house. (Note: Located at the then Pacific Highway (now known as SW Riverside Drive) with SW Military Road. The new house had been designed by Whidden & Lewis for a previous owner, which she altered and where she lived for the last nine years of her life. It was sold by her sons a few years after her 1936 death. It was described by The Oregonian in 1939: The former country estate of the late Mrs. Helen Ladd Corbett, constituting six and a half acres of sightly property near the Willamette River a short distance south of West Portland will be divided into several tracts on which fine country homes will soon be erected ... The site of the former Corbett estate extends from the Pacific highway [now SW Riverside Drive] at its junction with Southwest Military road along gentle slopes above the exclusive Riverwood section in the midst of many of the finest country estates and gardens near Portland. From several vantage points there is an outlook across the Willamette river towards Mount Hood.)

The Oregonian Building was later built on the site. (Note: The Oregonian Building opened in 1948, designed by Pietro Belluschi.) The Oregonian Building was subsequently bought by Amazon's AWS Elemental, formerly Elemental Technologies, whose headquarters now occupies the building.

== Infirmity and death ==
In the 1880s Ladd was suffering from a growing paralysis of his legs and had to steer a Bath chair pushed by an attendant for mobility, although once he was seated behind his desk visitors would not necessarily have known, and he continued his business and philanthropic activities with the aid of his eldest son, William M. Ladd.

William S. Ladd died in Portland on January 6, 1893, at the age of 66. He was buried at River View Cemetery.

His estate was variously believed to have been valued from $5 million to as high as $10 million, including 4,000 acres (16 km^{2}) in Tacoma and Portland. The estate value was believed to be underestimated by one source due to the Panic of 1893.

Ladd Acres Elementary in Reedville, Oregon (part of the Hillsboro School District) was built on the former land of Ladd and Reed's farm in Washington County, with the school named in Ladd's honor.

In 1909, his Hazel Fern Farm in Multnomah County was sold to become the Laurelhurst neighborhood, including Laurelhurst Park

Reed College was built on forty acres of William S. Ladd's land. The site for the college was donated by his son William M. Ladd.

The SS William S. Ladd Liberty ship (#2084) honouring his memory was launched on September 13, 1943, and was sunk by Kamikaze attack on December 10, 1944, 11 miles south of Dulag, Leyte, Pacific Islands.

== See also ==
- SS Williams S. Ladd

== Footnotes ==
Preceded by Josiah Failing	Mayor of Portland, Oregon; 1854–1855	Succeeded by George W. Vaughn
Preceded by James O'Neill	Mayor of Portland, Oregon; 1857–1858	Succeeded by A. M. Starr
