= Ladd Tower =

Building in Oregon

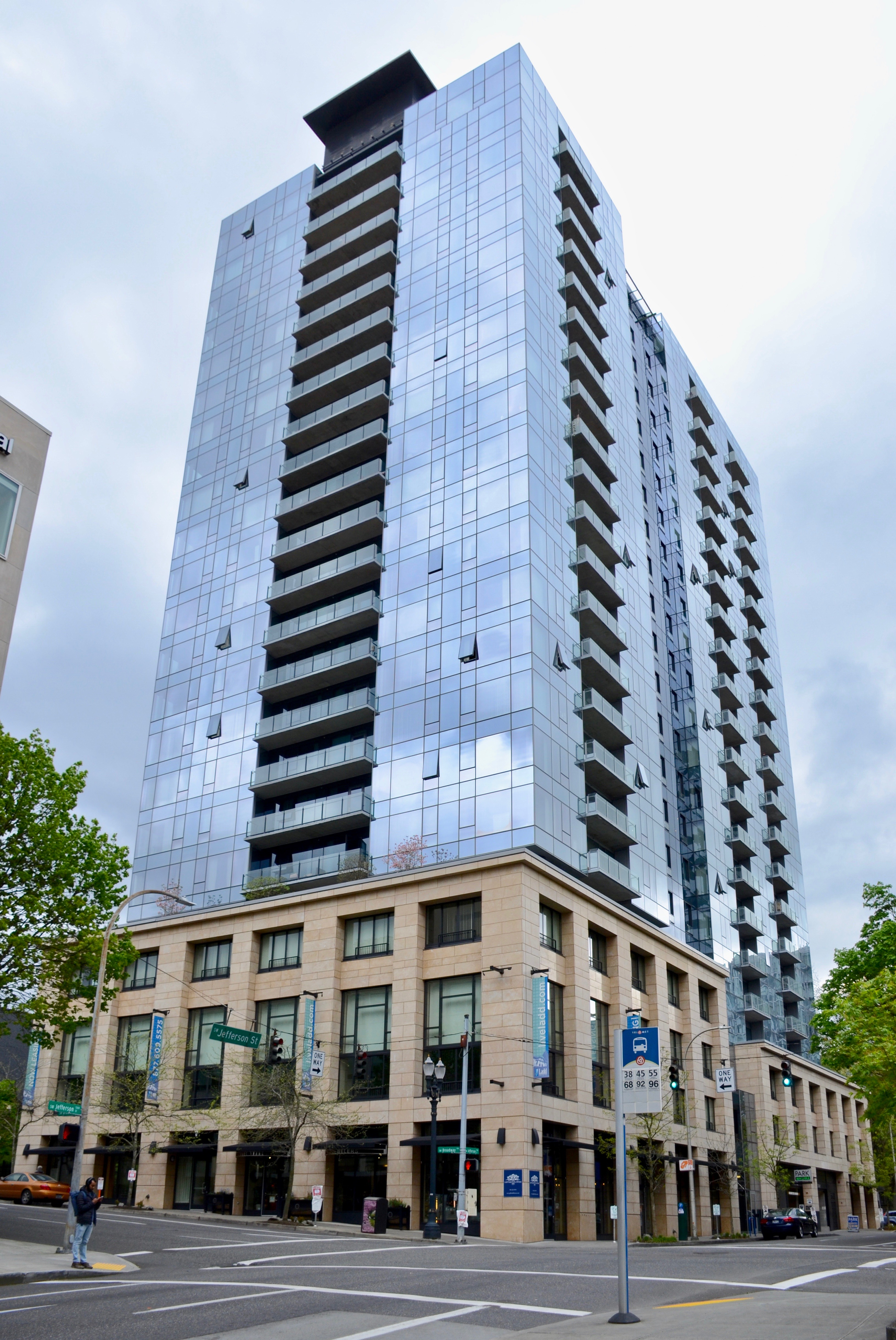
- Viewed from the east in 2019

- Location in downtown Portland

General information
- Location: 1300 Park Ave; Portland, Oregon
- Coordinates: 45.514978°N 122.682384°W
- Construction started: Fall 2006
- Completed: 2009

Height
- Height: 240 feet

Technical details
- Floor count: 23

Design and construction
- Architect: Ankrom Moisan Architects
- Main contractor: Opus Carroll LLC

Website
- www.hollandresidential.com/or/portland/ladd/

Ladd Tower is a 23-story residential building in downtown Portland, Oregon, completed in early 2009. The construction of Ladd Tower necessitated that the Ladd Carriage House, directly adjacent the construction site, temporarily be moved from its foundation; it returned in October 2008. The building is managed by Holland Residential, which also has commercial space on the ground floor. The main residential tower also shares space on the first through third floors with an adjacent church.

The tower is Leadership in Energy and Environmental Design-certified. The $80 million building stands 240 feet (73 m) tall.

The tower was originally slated to sell as condominiums. Only 60 of 200 units were presold. In 2007, Opus Northwest converted the project to rental apartments, returning deposits to approximately 60 buyers. The building was redesigned, with shorter ceilings, leaving the overall building height unchanged, but going from 21 to 23 floors. The apartments were smaller, at 332 apartments, versus 189 condos in the original plan.

The original design of the tower put the building flush against the South Park Blocks. A 27-foot setback beginning at the fourth story garnered "unanimous approval from the Portland Design Commission, a dramatic turnaround from icy receptions to two earlier proposals", according to The Oregonian. A local developer called it a "low-ego building".

The building is named after early local politician and developer William S. Ladd.

== See also ==
- Architecture in Portland, Oregon
