= Raven & Rose =

Restaurant in Portland, Oregon, U.S.

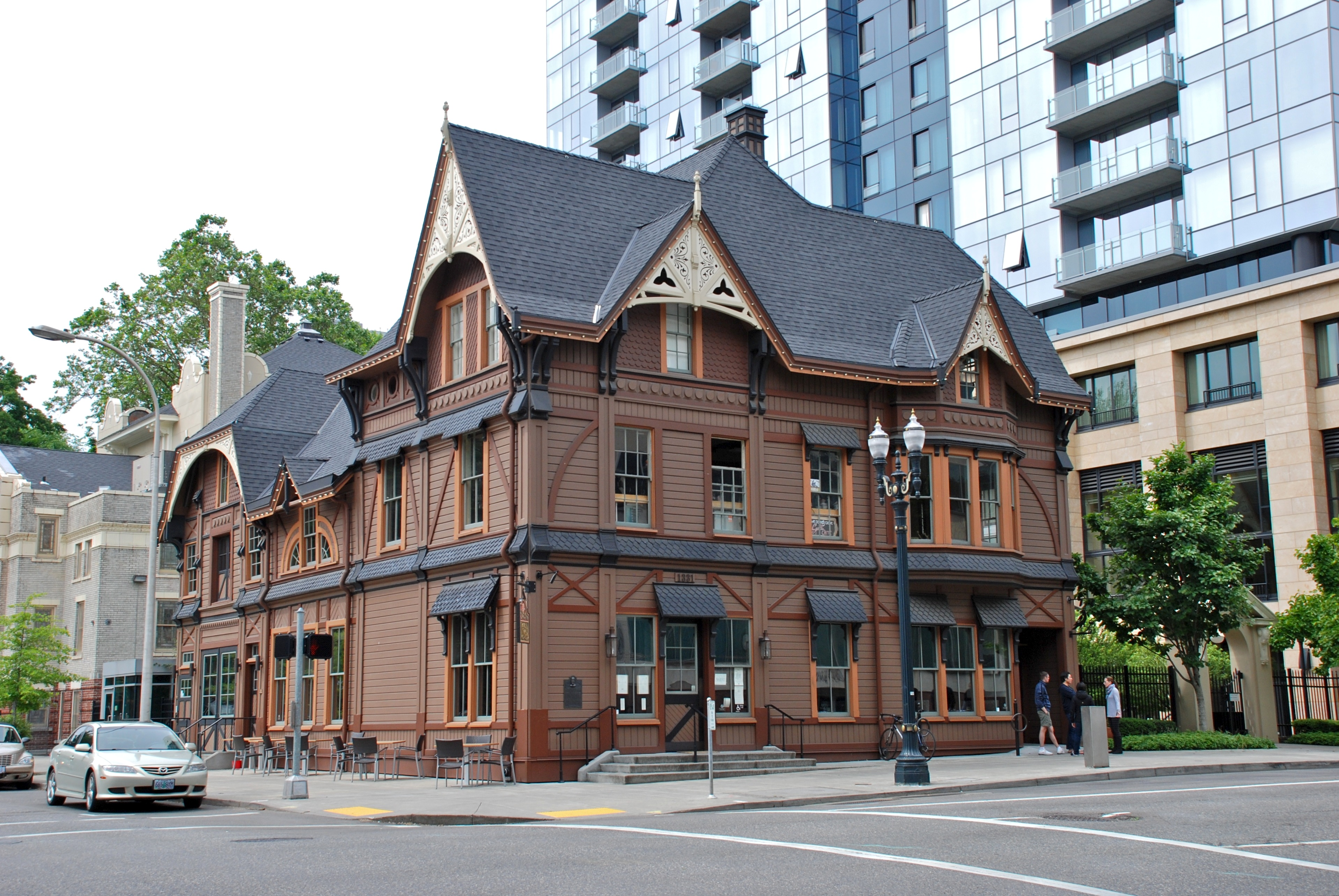
- Exterior of the Ladd Carriage House (pictured in 2014), which housed the restaurant Raven & Rose and upstairs cocktail bar The Rookery
- Interactive map of Raven & Rose

Restaurant information
- Food type: Irish
- Location: Portland, Multnomah, Oregon, United States
- Coordinates: 45.5149°N 122.6824°W
- Website: ravenandrosepdx.com

Raven & Rose was a restaurant in Portland, Oregon, with an upstairs cocktail bar called The Rookery. Both were housed in the Ladd Carriage House.

== Description ==
The "British Isles-inspired" and "Irish-influenced" restaurant Raven & Rose was housed in the Ladd Carriage House along Southwest Broadway in downtown Portland, along with an upstairs cocktail bar called The Rookery.

== History ==
Dave Shenaut became bar director in 2012 and continued to hold the position, as of 2015. Raven & Rose owner Lisa Mygrant confirmed the hiring of Daniel Mondok as executive chef in January 2016.

The restaurant and bar were forced to close temporarily during the COVID-19 pandemic. As of March 14, 2020, Raven & Rose planned to operate a takeout service and offer a special menu for St. Patrick's Day.

The restaurant had closed permanently by November 2021.

== See also ==
- List of Irish restaurants
