= SS William S. Ladd =

World War II Liberty ship of the United States

- Typical Liberty Ship at sea

History

United States
- Name: William S. Ladd
- Namesake: William S. Ladd
- Builder: Oregon Shipbuilding Company, Portland, Oregon
- Laid down: November 20, 1942
- Launched: December 15, 1942
- Acquired: December 23, 1942
- Fate: Sank on December 28, 1944 off Mindoro, Philippines, after Kamikaze strike

General characteristics
- Type: Liberty ship
- Tonnage: 7,225 GRT; 4,397 NRT
- Displacement: 14,245 long tons (14,474 t)
- Length: 422 ft 10 in (128.88 m)
- Beam: 57 ft 0 in (17.37 m)
- Draft: 27 ft 10 in (8.48 m)
- Depth of hold: 34 ft 10 in (10.62 m)
- Propulsion: Two oil-fired boilers, triple-expansion steam engine, single screw, 2,500 hp (1,864 kW)
- Speed: 11 knots (20 km/h; 13 mph)
- Complement: 41 crew, 29 Armed Guard, 70 total
- Armament: Combination of 4 in (100 mm), 40 mm, 20 mm, and .50 caliber guns

SS William S. Ladd (MC hull number 2084) was an American Liberty ship built during World War II, one of the 2,710 type 'EC2-S-C1' ships that carried all kinds and types of dry cargo during the war. She was named for William S. Ladd, an American politician and businessman in Oregon, who twice served as Portland's mayor in the 1850s. The ship's keel was laid on August 29, 1943, and 15 days later, on September 13, the hull was launched. William S. Ladd was fitted out in seven days, and was delivered to the U.S. Navy on September 20. The Navy placed Ladd under charter to Weyerhaeuser Steamship Co.

William S. Ladd came under attack on December 10, 1944 while anchored off Leyte, Philippines unloading her cargo of gasoline and ammunition. A Japanese Kamikaze crashed into the ship, and after a two-hour fire-fighting battle, Ladd sank. Ladd was the last of the ships built in the Pacific Northwest to fall to enemy action.

== Construction and design ==
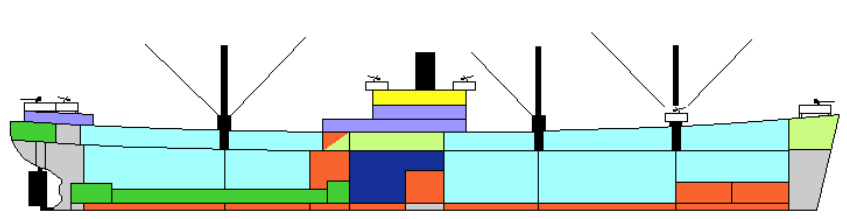
A colored diagram of compartments on a Liberty ship, from the right side, front to the right Machinery spaces Command and control Liquid stores Dry cargo Engine room Misc Dry stores Habitation

William S. Ladd was powered by two oil-fired boilers and a single 2,500 hp (1,864 kW) vertical type, triple-expansion reciprocating steam engine. Using the color-coded image at the left, The machinery space (dark blue in the picture) was located at the middle of the ship. The single propeller was driven through a long propeller shaft that ran through a tunnel (lower green area in the picture) under the aft cargo holds. The propeller rotated at 76 rpm, giving a speed of about 11 knots (20 km/h; 13 mph). There were two decks running the full length of the ship, with seven watertight bulkheads dividing the machinery space and five cargo holds (light blue in the picture), three ahead of the machinery space and two aft. Crew accommodations were provided in a large three-deck structure located in the middle of the ship (medium blue in the picture) directly above the machinery space, and in a small structure (medium blue in the picture) located at the stern. The bridge, radio room and Captain's quarters were located on the top deck (yellow in the picture) of the three-deck structure. The fuel for the boiler was carried in several tanks (red in the picture) located throughout the ship. Ship's storage (light green in the picture) was located at the bow and above the machinery space. Gun crew quarters and the ship's hospital were located in the stern structure. When armed, the gun 'tubs' (white in the picture) were located at the bow, stern and above the bridge. These could be any mixture of 5 in (130 mm), 4 in (100 mm), 3 in (76 mm), 40 mm (1.57 in), 20 mm (0.79 in) and/or .5-inch (12.70 mm) caliber guns.

The ship's steering was by a contrabalanced rudder (black, at left in the picture), with its associated steering gear located in a compartment (green in the picture) above the rudder and below the aft structure. Steam-powered generators provided electric power for radios, navigation equipment, refrigeration compressors, pumps, lighting, and degaussing. An evaporator produced fresh water for the boilers and for the crew. Large hatches above the cargo holds allowed steam winches and booms rigged to three centerline masts to quickly load or unload cargo. Liberty ships carried weapons, ammunition, food, tools, hardware, vehicles, and other things needed for the war effort. They could also be equipped to carry a large number of troops by rigging bunks in the holds similar to those used by the Armed Guard.

== History ==
Like many Liberty Ships, William S. Ladd transported war materials between the United States and the rear areas of the Pacific Front, often calling at Pearl Harbor, Australia, Guadalcanal, Hollandia and Manaus. The SS William S. Ladd was the last ship to be sunk while lying at anchor off Leyte, in the Philippines Islands. Before she went down in Leyte Gulf, she established a record of four Japanese planes destroyed. She accounted for the first one plane on the afternoon of December 5 and knocked down three on December 10. It was one of these three planes crashed into her sending her to the bottom.

== The attack ==
William S. Ladd was preparing to unload 500 barrels of gasoline and 150-tons of ammunition when a Japanese Kamikaze smashed into the ship's after mast. The shredded plane continued on to hit the midship house, then falling toward the stern and into the #4 cargo hold. The aircraft's bombs exploded once inside of the hold, shattering the engine room bulkhead. A number of explosions in No. 4 and No. 5 holds followed. Fires started throughout the ship, and with fire lines severed by the blast, they soon raged out of control. At 1750 the after-guns were secured and the men manning them were ordered to abandon ship. At 1830, after a futile two hour battle to save the ship, Captain Nels F. Anderson of Silver Lake, Washington, ordered all hands off the ship as it settled by the stern. At 1840 forward guns No. 1 to 5 were ordered secured and the Armed Guards were ordered to abandon ship. At 1930 the last Navy personnel and ship's officers abandoned the doomed vessel. No one was killed, eight Armed Guards were wounded and hospitalized on Leyte.

Today, SS William S. Ladd lies at the bottom of Leyte Gulf at approximately 10°15′N 125°10′E.

== See also ==
- List of Liberty ships
- Liberty ship
- Type C1 ship
- Type C2 ship
- Type C3 ship
