= Ladd Hill, Oregon =

Unincorporated community in the state of Oregon, United States

- Unincorporated community
- Location within Oregon Location within the United States
- Coordinates: 45°16′27″N 122°51′22″W
- Country: United States
- State: Oregon
- County: Clackamas
- Elevation: 338 ft (103 m)
- Time zone: UTC-8 (Pacific (PST))
  - Summer (DST): UTC-7 (PDT)
- ZIP code: 97070
- Area codes: 503 and 971
- GNIS feature ID: 1136457

Ladd Hill is an unincorporated community in Clackamas County, Oregon, United States. The Hill is named after William S. Ladd who owned property on the north side of the Williamite River in what is now the community.
