= A. M. Starr =

American politician

9th Mayor of Portland, Oregon
- In office 1858–1859
- Preceded by: William S. Ladd
- Succeeded by: S. J. McCormick

Personal details
- Born: c. 1820
- Died: April 30, 1891 (aged 71) San Francisco, California, U.S.
- Party: Republican
- Profession: Businessman

Addison M. Starr (c. 1820 – April 30, 1891), better known as A. M. Starr, was an American politician who served as the 9th mayor of Portland, Oregon from 1858 until 1859. He was born in New York and came to live in Portland in 1850, opening a stove and tin store with his brother, Louis (or Lewis).

He served as Multnomah County Sheriff from 1858 to 1862.

He lived in San Francisco, California, from 1862 until his death, on April 30, 1891, at the age of 71.

Preceded by William S. Ladd	Mayor of Portland, Oregon; 1858–1859	Succeeded by S. J. McCormick
