= Ladd Carriage House =

Historic building in Portland, Oregon, U.S.

- U.S. National Register of Historic Places
- Portland Historic Landmark
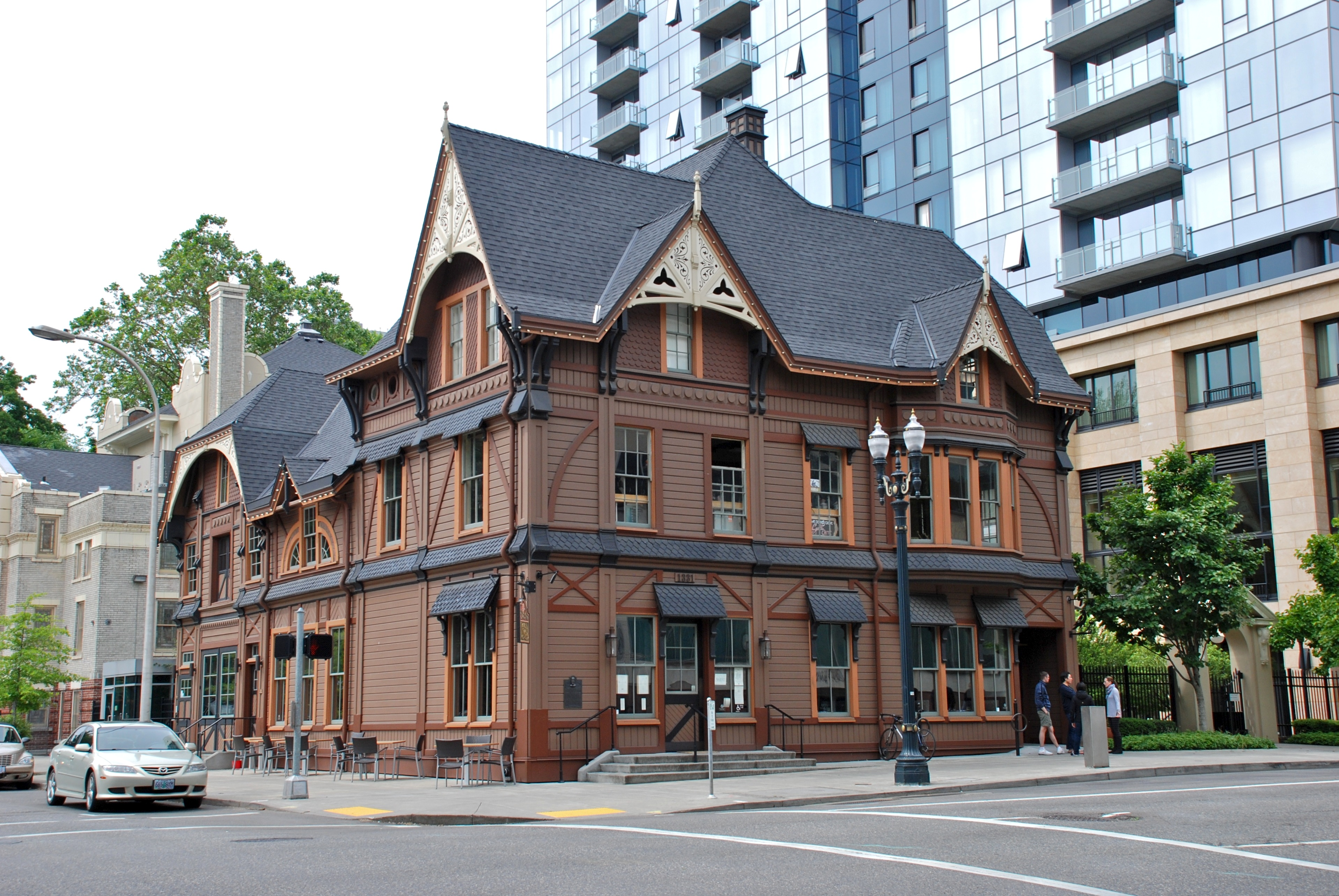
- The Ladd Carriage House in 2014

- Location within Portland, Oregon
- Location: 1331 SW Broadway; Portland, Oregon
- Coordinates: 45°30′54″N 122°40′56″W
- Area: < 1 acre (0.40 ha)
- Built: 1883
- Built by: William S. Ladd
- Architect: Joseph Sherwin
- Architectural style: Stick-Eastlake
- NRHP reference No.: 09001211 (previously 80003369)

Significant dates
- First listed on NRHP: February 12, 1980
- First de-listed: January 4, 2008
- Re-listed: January 7, 2010

The Ladd Carriage House is a building in downtown Portland, Oregon, at Broadway and Columbia. It is one of the few surviving buildings forming part of the former grand estates which once stood in the downtown core. It is listed on the National Register of Historic Places.

The building served as a coach house and stables for the William S. Ladd mansion, once located across Broadway on the block bounded by Broadway, Columbia, 6th Avenue and Jefferson. The Carriage House was built in 1883, designed by architect Joseph Sherwin, to house the Ladd family's horses and carriages.

== Early subsequent use ==
Helen Ladd Corbett (after the premature death of her husband Henry Jagger Corbett, eldest son of Henry W. Corbett), was the last occupant of her parents' William S. Ladds' house. She later sold the Carriage House (or Ladd Barn as it was also known) in 1925 to the Hoffman family's Wauna Land Company.

The Ladd mansion and the city block that the house and garden occupied across the street (Broadway) were also later sold by Helen Ladd Corbett in 1926 for a proposed hotel, prior to her move to the south of Portland, which earlier had been known as Rivera now known as the Dunthorpe area. Her new house was located on the grounds at Pacific Highway (now SW Riverside Drive), SW Military Road and SW Military Lane. The hotel was never built owing to the Depression. The city block was subsequently purchased in 1944 by the Oregonian Publishing Company and the Pietro Belluschi designed building was built there by The Oregonian for its headquarters, which it occupied until 2014 when it was subsequently bought by Amazon's AWS Elemental, whose headquarters now occupies the building.

The Carriage house was renovated in October 1926 and was divided into specialty shops with additional windows. The architect was Morris H. Whitehouse, There were five studios on the first level and the top floor, the former hay loft, was used as a dance floor and an apartment.

The Society of Arts and Crafts and the Portland Civic Theatre each had a studio in the building. Hoffman Construction had offices there from 1933 and in later years occupied the whole building. The architect Van Evera Bailey had his office in the carriage house.

== House relocation and restoration ==
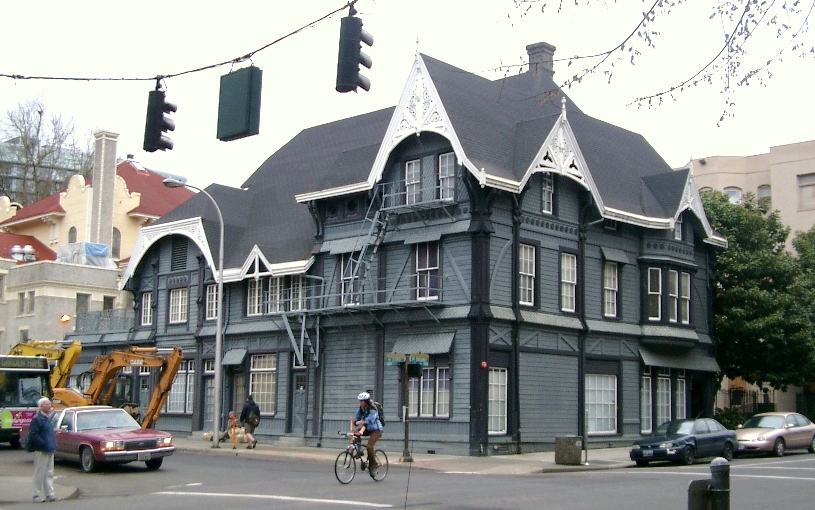
The house in 2007, wearing an earlier paint scheme

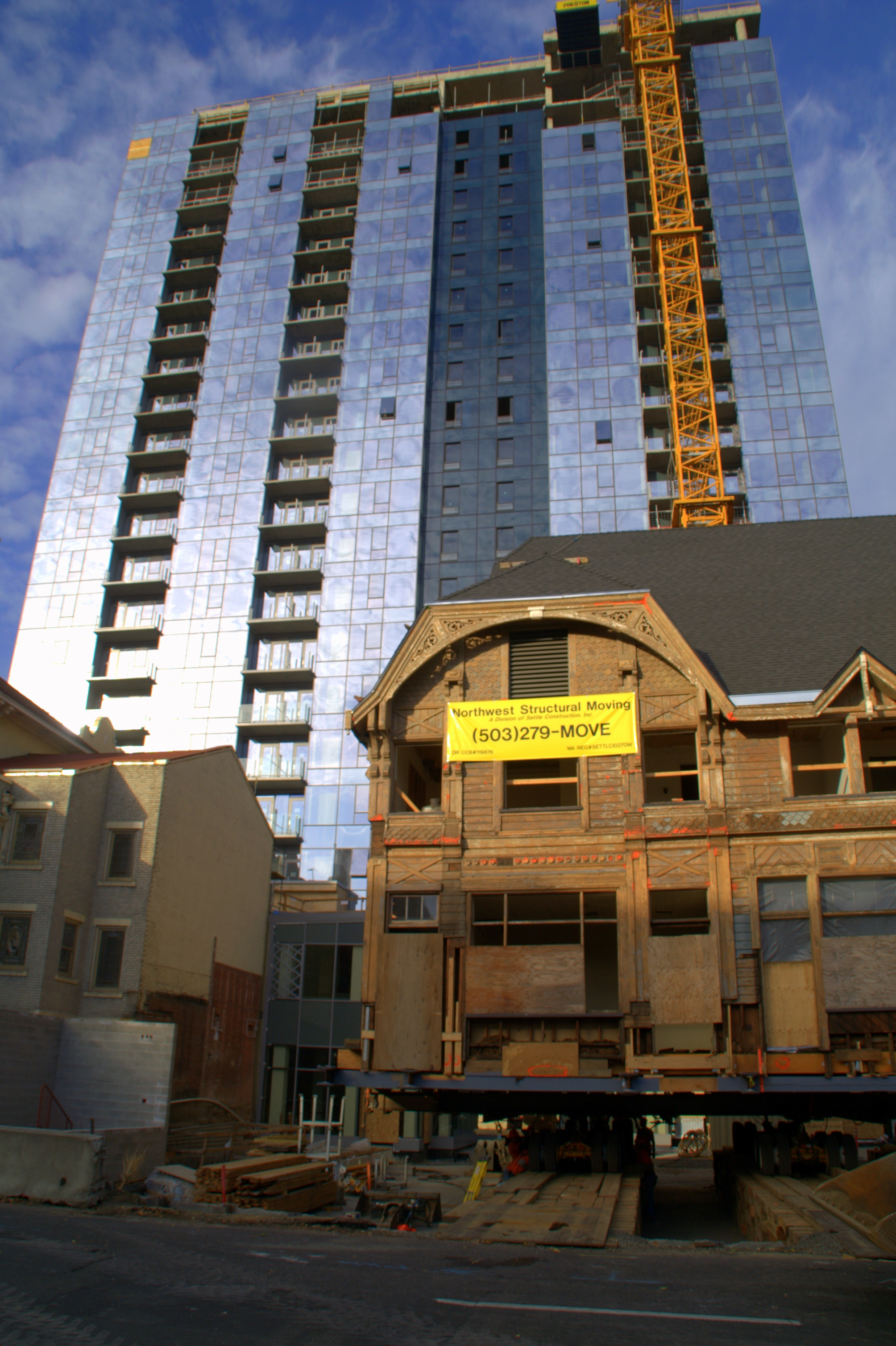
The house in 2008, after being moved back to its original site, with Ladd Tower in the background

The future of the building was in doubt when the neighboring First Christian Church announced plans to redevelop the block. The congregation bought the Ladd Carriage House in 1971, and sought to expand parking for its members. As part of the redevelopment, a condominium tower, Ladd Tower, would be built above a parking garage. A demolition permit had been secured for the lot, but never used. Nevertheless, this raised alarm bells in the preservationist community and a grass-roots campaign, the Friends of Ladd Carriage House, was formed to either save or move the old building. One proposal was to move the Carriage House to Lair Hill, but this was logistically complex (steep streets, crossing bridges, cutting Portland Streetcar lines).

A compromise was agreed where the Ladd Carriage House would be moved temporarily while a new garage was excavated. The building would then be moved back onto its original site. The plans for the condominium tower were scaled back so that the tower's footprint only occupied half the block, instead of three-quarters of it.

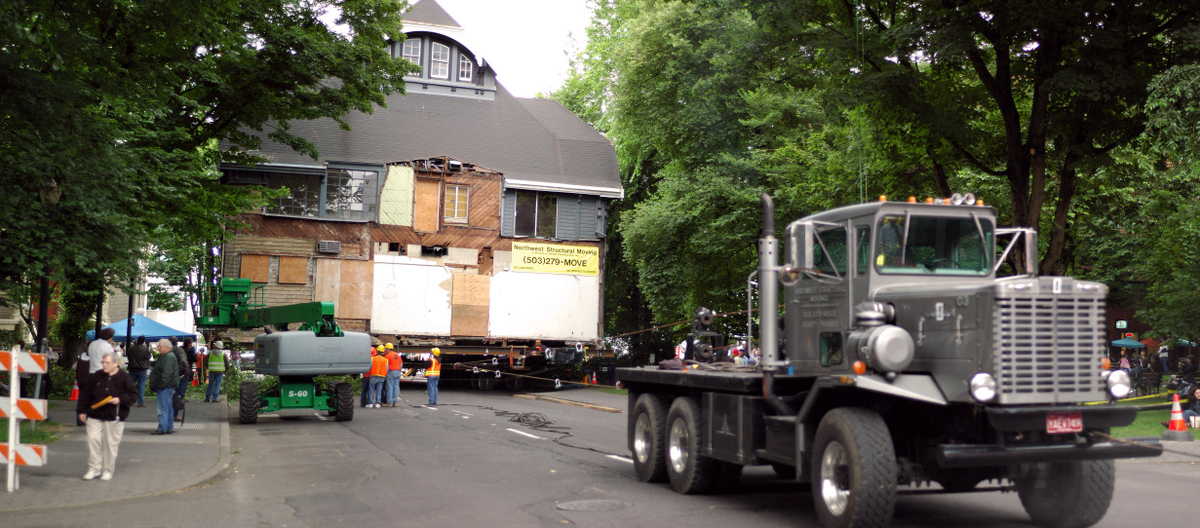
The Ladd Carriage House being temporarily moved to a different location in 2007.

On June 16, 2007, after ground was broken on Ladd Tower, the Ladd Carriage House was moved to the parking lot owned by the First Christian Church at the corner of 10th and Columbia streets. This meant the building didn't need to cross streetcar lines. It was moved back to its original site on October 25, 2008.

== Latest renovation and use ==
Extensive exterior renovations occurred after the Ladd Carriage House moved back to its original site by Venerable Properties. In April 2009 the house was repainted, going from shades of blue to shades of brown. The house was restored to the National Register of Historic Places in 2010, and in 2011 the building was sold for $1 million. Interior renovations began in spring 2012, and the Raven & Rose restaurant opened in fall 2012.

This latest Ladd Carriage House restoration received a preservation Award by the Victorian Society in America.

== See also ==
- Architecture of Portland, Oregon
- National Register of Historic Places listings in Southwest Portland, Oregon
