= Theodore Gegoux =

Canadian artist

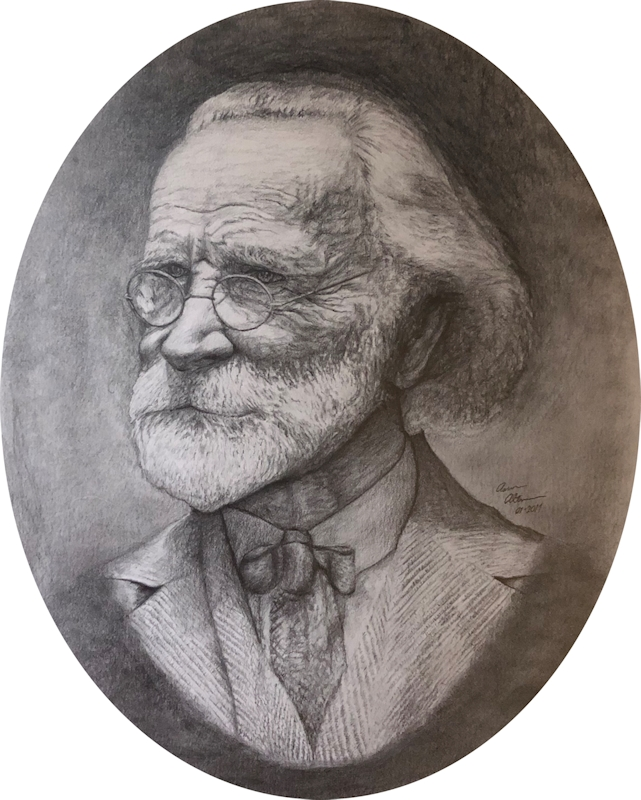
Theodore Gegoux

Theodore Gegoux was born November 19, 1850, in St-Clement Beauharnois, Canada East. Gegoux was a commercial success as a portrait artist in and around Watertown New York during the latter half of the 19th century. So prolific was he, that by the age of 32 he claimed 1300 completed portraits. For 30 years Gegoux lived in northern New York state, producing portraits; still lifes; and occasionally landscapes; one of the most noted artists in Watertown. In 1890, Hamilton Child wrote in his Gazetteer that Gegoux had established himself at Watertown, New York as, ".. one of the best oil, pastel, and crayon portrait artists in the city." Gegoux also painted still life, frequently fruits and flowers. Marine paintings were another topic, Gegoux painted both oceans Atlantic and Pacific. He also painted scenes of Lake Ontario and the St. Lawrence River. There are many more works of art, lost works, than have thus far been catalogued. Each year more are discovered.

Gegoux painted various subjects or differing types of media; as can be further evidenced by a letter from Prof Gerdts, author of Art Across America.

Gegoux is -- and understandably -- a "provincial" artist -- not a primitive, but not really "high style" academic either. But fascinating for his straightforward renderings of themes that more sophisticated painters might shy away from. Having said that, I must say that his still lifes are really beautifully done -- very, very skillfully rendered, though in a manner more similar to that "realism" of the 1850s-'70s, than the more either radically modernist or poetic approach of his own time. -- William H. Gerdts, 1990, Professor Emeritus of Art History, City University of New York

Gegoux worked with oils on canvas and crayon on linen backed paper. Gegoux also used many other media and varied subject material. Gegoux once painted a portrait on plate glass which was mounted into a wall like a window to catch the morning sun. He painted flowers on wooden panels. He painted oil on artist board; and he executed still life in watercolors on paper. Gegoux painted portraits of the deceased from old photos; verbal descriptions; and from views of the corpse. He was often summoned by parents who wanted an image to memorialize their departed child. He painted a pet portrait of his son's cat "Hims", oil on canvas. Gegoux painted nocturnal scenes of structure fires. He also painted several doublets, which are two identical portraits. As such, two family members would each have a portrait. In 1984, John A. Haddock wrote in his Centennial History of Jefferson County, New York, regarding the portrait of Justin W. Weeks 1889 .. "The artist Gegoux, has painted an heroic sized portrait of Mr. Weeks, which has attained deserved popularity as a fine work of art -- reflecting great credit upon the artist, for he has made a picture that seems just ready to walk out of the frame, to become the very living man himself. The writer lately examined that picture with great interest. Nothing finer in the way of portraiture is seen in any of the great galleries of Europe -- a thing easy to say, but which any observing European traveler will verify."

Gegoux painted at least three Presidents, although none from life. Lincoln's portrait survives at the Jefferson County Historical Society, New York. Gegoux's U.S. Grant portrait was eight feet tall; it was hung on the Armory at the Watertown, New York on the day of Grant's National Funeral. The Grant portrait was later gifted to the Joe Spratt G.A.R Post at Watertown. Gegoux's portrait of President Garfield was as a civil war general. Gegoux also painted five other Civil War Generals, although none from life. His portrait of General Meade "being as near perfection as a likeness can be. It almost seems capable of speaking so life-like is the expression and color". In addition to Meade, Generals Burnside, Hancock, Logan, and McClellan were executed in oil, all sized 4' x 3' for the G.A.R. Post.

Gegoux's "A Young Paganini" was accepted for the 1896 First Annual International Carnegie Exhibition at Pittsburgh. This period was the height of Gegoux's success and fame. One of Gegoux's finest portraits is a "The Portrait of Two Sisters" 1908, which is a portrait of Agnes Louis Flanders (1905–1979) and Helen Mary Flanders (1903–1994) commissioned by their grandfather and executed in oil on canvas. One of Gegoux's finest pastel works is the "Keewaydin Mansion in Moonlight" c. 1895. A nocturnal scene in moonlight from the perspective of a boat on the St Lawrence River depicting a once famous home, which was later destroyed by fire. The Mansion once stood on the grounds of what is now the Keewaydin State Park. Gegoux did not attain significant notice beyond his local area; although these years in New York were a financial success. Gegoux wanted to join the New York City art scene, but he never got closer than Schenectady.

Seeking a new frontier to revitalize his career, in the fall of 1909 Gegoux secretly left his wife and two grown boys for Oregon. His whereabouts were a mystery to his family and friends for more than two years. Unbeknownst to anyone who knew him, Gegoux had arrived at Portland in early 1910. Finding the "Haunted Castle" vacant, Gegoux chose Piggott's folly for his residence and studio. In those early days of the 20th Century, every resident of Portland, Oregon knew about the "haunted castle". This was so much the case that, in 1910 the census taker listed this address as the "haunted castle". The census found Gegoux living there. In 1911 Gegoux told an Oregonian reporter at the Haunted Castle, "... I am up here where it is quiet, where no one disturbs me and I can work to the best advantage." This reporter went on to provide a rare account of the artist's physical appearance, "Mr. Gegoux is a man below the ordinary size and his hair and mustache are plentifully mixed with the silver that marks the other side of the crest of life. He is very quiet, although he exhibits high nervous temperament that determination and close application to his work has subdued." The Haunted Castle is where Gegoux started work on the portraits of the "Early Mayors of Portland"; a collection of 29 works; all oil on canvas; all sized 26" by 21". This collection was completed in 1915 while Gegoux was living in Southern California with his youngest son Frank. Only two of these portraits were individually sold. The remaining collection has been property of the Oregon Historical Society since 1927.

In 1916 Gegoux returned to Oregon where, guided by George Himes secretary of the Oregon Historical Society, began work on "The Inception of the Birth of Oregon". This largest of Gegoux's work, oil on canvas, measures 80" x 103". The principle work was finished and copyrighted in 1920. The hand carved frame and date were added in 1923.

The painting composition was informed by discussions with George Himes; it faithfully depicts the so-called "Meek Myth" version of the settlers meeting at Champoeg in May 1843. George Himes and a long list of historians did not think this version a myth. Rather, they believed it to be true history. When it came time to vote, these pioneers were a mass of settlers too unruly to be accurately counted. They were divided into two groups by Joe Meek with a wave of his hat and a call to "divide". Two French Canadians, F. X. Matthieu and Etienne Lucier, joined the Americans at the last minute to win the vote for organization. This version of events is still hotly debated today. What is not debated is that from the moment of that meeting, that historic vote, Oregon was never again without a civil organization. The Oregonian newspaper of December 16, 1900, reported on the significance of this meeting, " .. the spirit of those resolute, patriotic, and competent common wealth fathers has fitting expression in an enduring monument."

To commemorate this meeting a granite monument was placed at Champoeg on May 5, 1901. The Morning Oregonian newspaper account, on that date, implied that a commemorative painting of this meeting could ".. be a matter of great interest." This news copy was likely written by George Himes, described a vision for a historic painting of this Champoeg meeting ".. if its personnel could be given with reasonable accuracy, and the full significance of what has grown out of that gathering of incongruous elements adequately portrayed, would give a subject for a great historical painting." Gegoux painted the scene of the pioneer settlers gathered at the McLoughlin Warehouse near the settlement of Champoeg. Unfortunately that warehouse and the town " .. hugged too closely the bank of the Willamette River for permanence, and in the swirl of waters known as the flood of 1861 its frail buildings were washed away."

Gegoux was arguably an unlikely artist for this project. He called on George Himes at the rooms of the Oregon Historical Society carrying a portrait of Portland's mayor. He appeared little more than an itinerant artist, giving the "haunted castle" as his address. Himes must have seen something in Gegoux. Himes had recruited two previous artists, However both candidates, W. H. Gilstrap (1849–1914) and George O'Brien (1853–1914), died before work began. First in 1902, Himes and Gilstrap discussed creating a large canvas scene for the Lewis and Clark exposition of 1905. Trips to Champoeg were conducted and discussions ensued but no paint touched canvas, likely due to a lack of funding. Regarding George O'Brien, as late as 1912 Mr. Himes was still in discussions with this artist who eventually took a portrait commission from the Mayo physicians of Wisconsin, where Mr. O'Brien died. Gegoux was the third artist that Himes had recruited, but the only one to produce the painting.

Gegoux painted under most challenging conditions; and he chose an unlikely location for his studio. Few other artists would have chosen the former Jette tavern in the woods within the flood plains of the Willamette River. He painted in a building that was so ill-suited a wall had to be knocked out to give the artist a proper perspective of the picture. The historic work was nearly lost to fire, when that "studio" caught fire on a spring morning in 1918. The historic painting was saved from flames; some have said that Arthur Jette and his young son entered the burning structure to recover the painting.

Gegoux had wanted a place for his masterpiece in the State Capitol, but the State voted against buying the painting. Which turned out to be a fortunate fate when the Capitol burned, nearly to the ground, in 1935. At the time of the State Capitol fire, the "Birth of Oregon" was safely rolled up at Bekins Moving and Storage in Portland. This historic painting survives. Gegoux considered this work his masterpiece; this historic painting reflects the culmination of all this artist's skill and ability. The painting is now exhibited at the Champoeg visitors' center.

Stricken by dementia in his final years, Gegoux is not believed to have painted after 1926. He died on July 3, 1931, at the "County Farm", which is now Rancho Los Amigos Medical Center, Downey California.

== Gallery ==
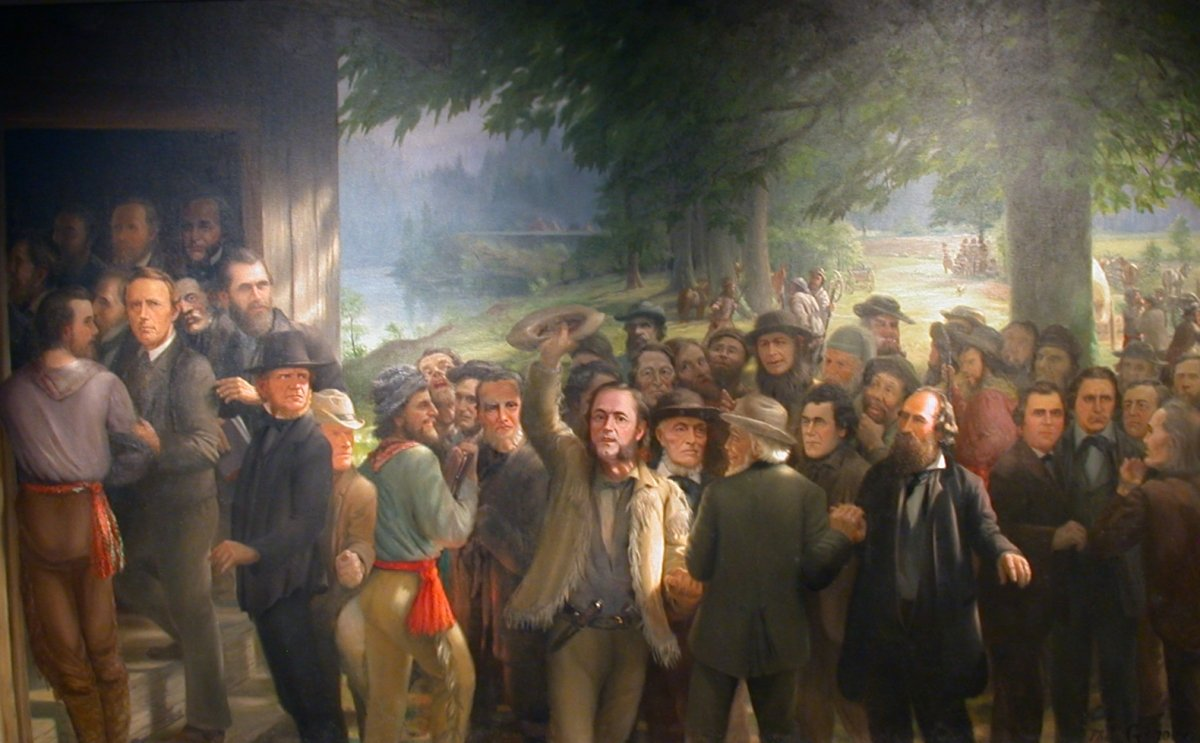
The Inception of the Birth of Oregon, 1923 by T. Gegoux, oil on canvas, 80 ins x 103 ins, exhibited at Visitor Center, Champoeg State Park, Oregon

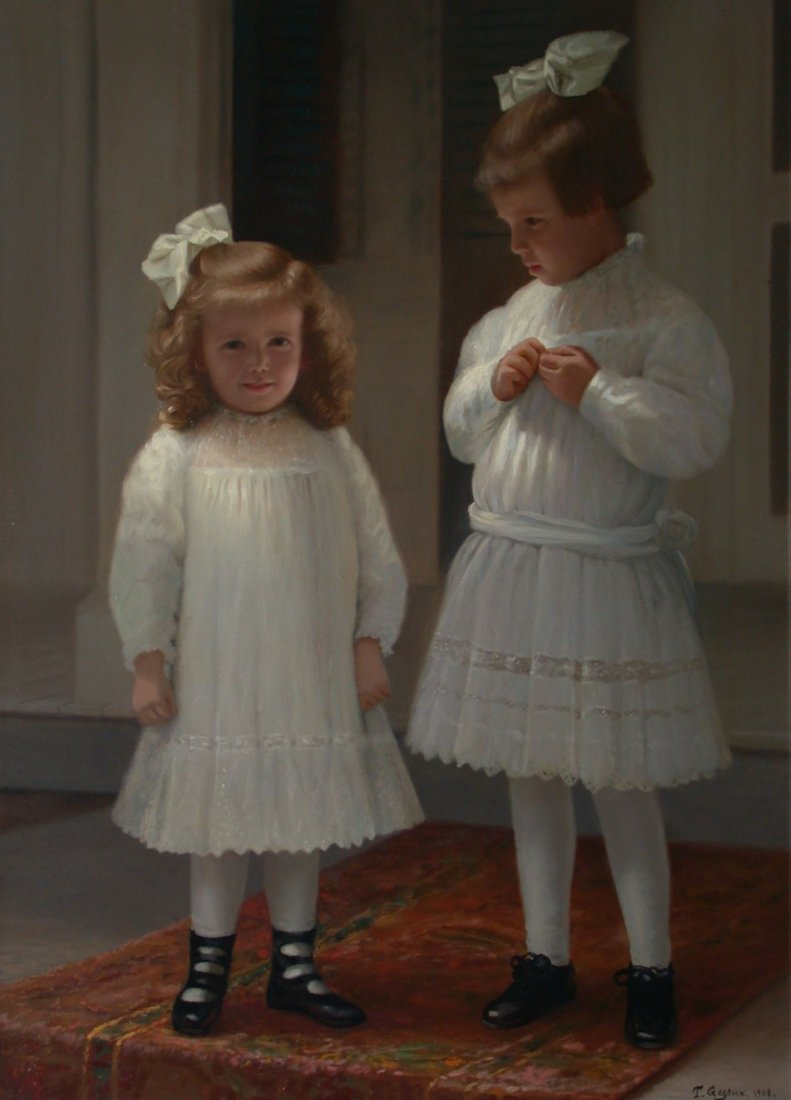
The Portrait of Two Sisters, 1908, T. Gegoux, oil on canvas, 30 ins x 22 ins, Agnes Louis Flanders (1905–1979) and Helen Mary Flanders (1903–1994)

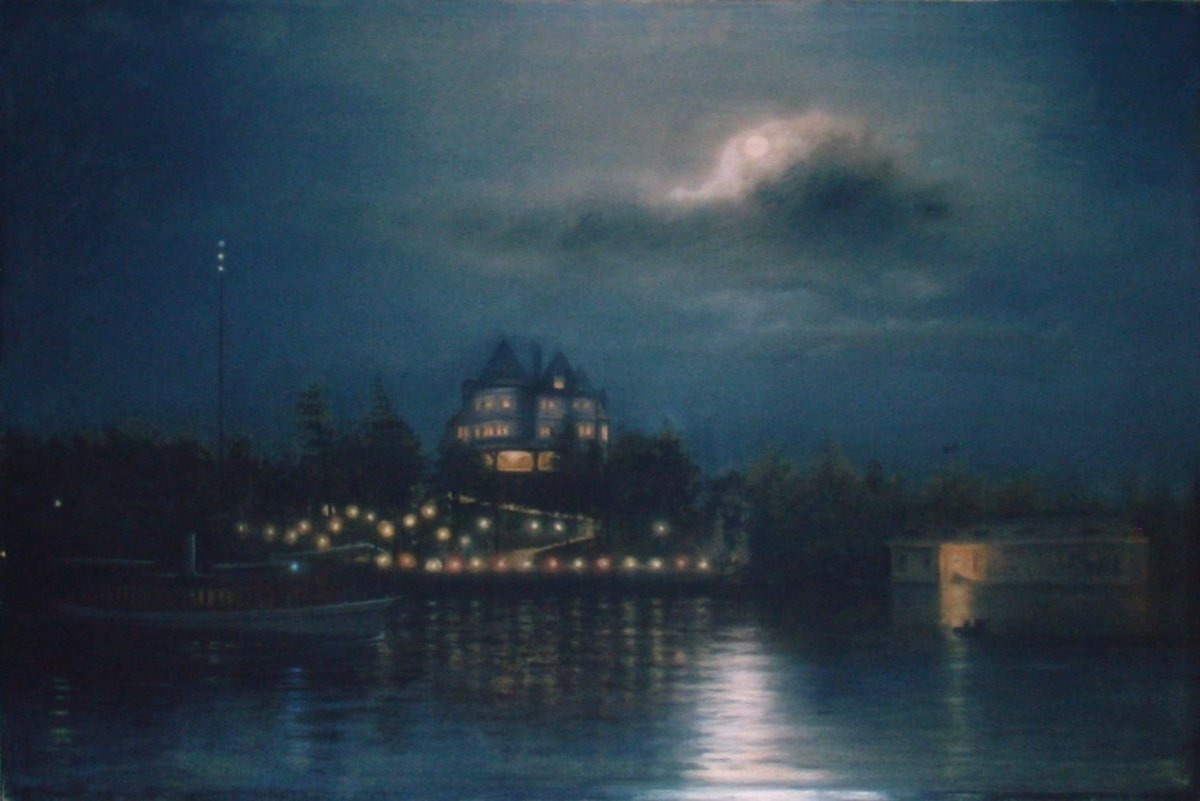
Keewaydin Mansion in Moonlight .. circa 1895, T. Gegoux, pastel crayon on paper, 27 ins x 40 ins, exhibited at Keewaydin State Park, Alexandria Bay, New York

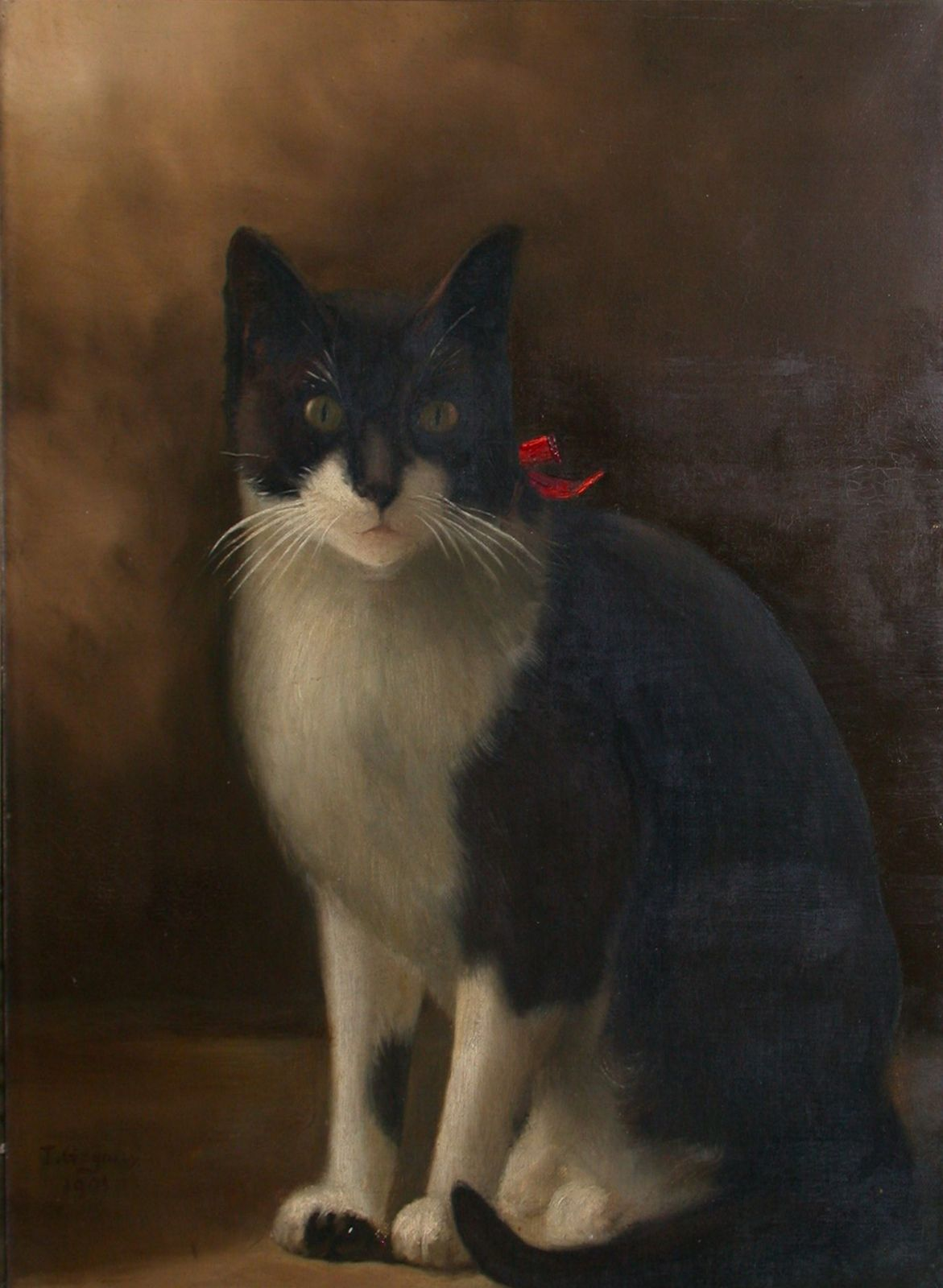
The Portrait of Hims circa 1901, T. Gegoux, oil on canvas, 14 ins x 12 ins, Private Collection

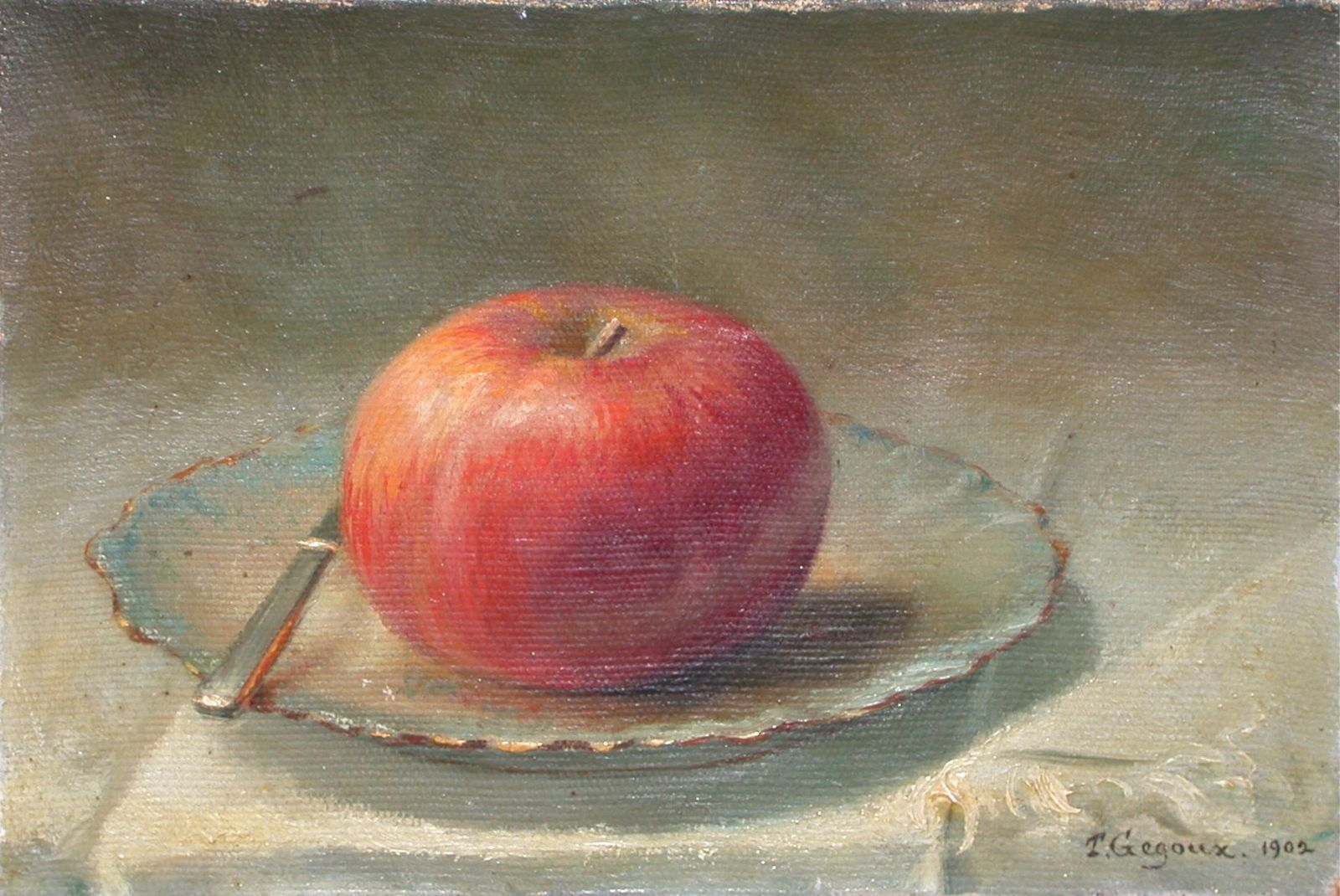
Apple Still Life with Knife, 1902, T. Gegoux, oil on canvas, 6.75 ins x 9.75 ins, Private Collection

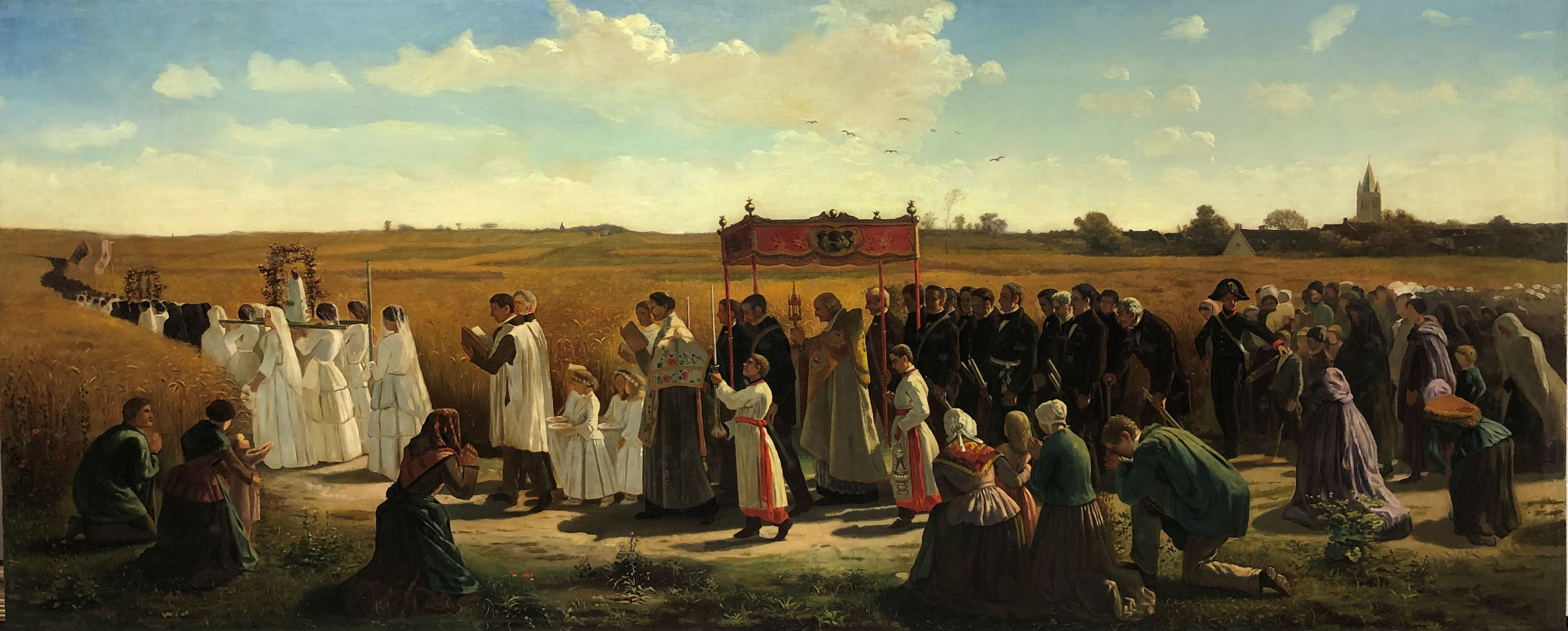
The Blessing of Wheat at Artois, 1882 copied by Gegoux, oil on canvas, 50.05 ins by 125.5 ins, original by Jules Breton (1827–1906)

== Bibliography ==
- "19th Century Paintings, Drawings and Watercolors", by Christie's East, October 25, 1988
- "A Creative Capitalist" by Boni Shafer, January 31, 2012 - NNY (Northern New York) Business, January 2012 edition page 44 & 45.
- "Art Across America" in 3 volumes, by William Gerdts, 1990
- "Artists in California, 1786-1940 - 3rd Edition", by Edan Hughes, 2002
- "Artists of the Pacific Northwest, a biographical dictionary", by Maria Sharylen, 1993
- "Catalog of Copyright Entries" by Library of Congress, Copyright Office - 1920
- "Catalogue, First Annual Exhibition", by Carnegie Art Galleries, 1896
- "Gazetteer of Jefferson County, N.Y. ", by Hamilton Child, July 1890, page 296
- "Champoeg: Place of Transition", by John A. Hussey, 1967
- "Davenport Art Reference", by Raymond Davenport, 2003-2004
- "History of the Oregon Country" in six volumes, by Harvey W. Scott, 1924
- "Oregon Painters, Landscape to Modernism (1859–1959) 2nd Edition", by Ginny Allen & Jody Klevit, 2021, page 174 & 175.
- "Oregon Painters, the first hundred years (1859–1959)", Ginny Allen & Jody Klevit, 1999
- "Record of the Carnegie Institute's International Exhibitions 1896-1996", by Peter Hastings Falk, 1998
- "The Autobiography of Theodore Gegoux", by Theodore Gegoux, 1926
- "The Centennial History of Jefferson County, New York", by John Haddock, 1894
- "The Pacific Northwest Landscape - a painted history" by Kitty Harmon & Jonathan Rabin, 2001
- "Theodore Gegoux Painted the Steamboat St. Lawrence, Who Was He?" by Richard F. Palmer October 13, 2018 - Thousand Island Life (http://tilife.org/)
