= Fuel Coffee & Books =

Chain of coffee shops and bookstores in Seattle, Washington, U.S.

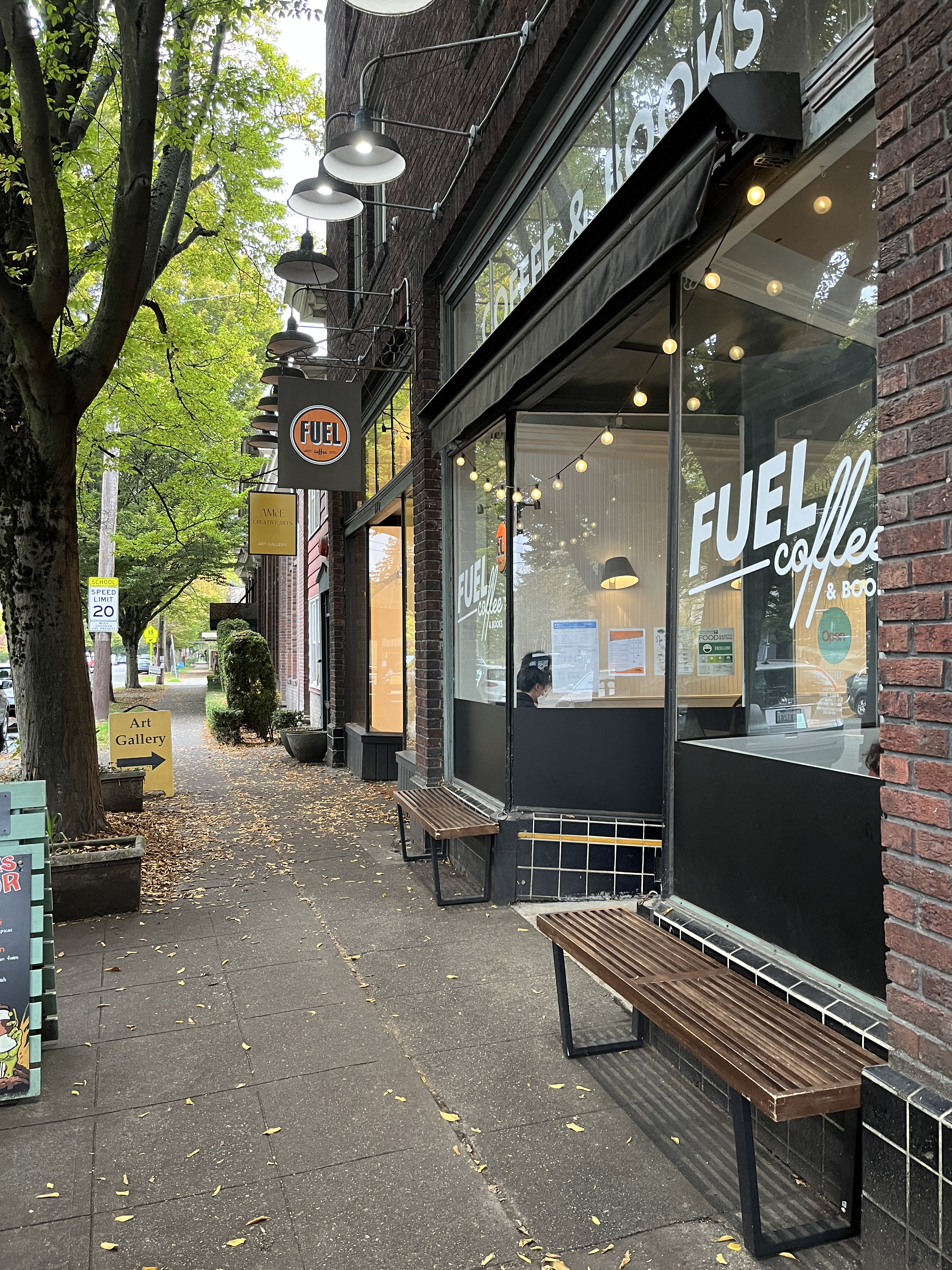
- Exterior of the Capitol Hill shop, 2023
- Interactive map of Fuel Coffee & Books

Restaurant information
- Established: 2005
- Owners: Danielle and David Hulton
- Previous owner: Dani Cone
- Location: Seattle, Washington, United States
- Coordinates: 47.6247°N 122.3070°W
- Website: fuelcoffeeseattle.com

Fuel Coffee & Books (formerly and more commonly known as simply Fuel Coffee) is a small chain of coffee shops and bookstores in Seattle, in the U.S. state of Washington. Dani Cone opened the original shop on Capitol Hill in 2005. Montlake and Wallingford locations followed in 2006 and 2007, respectively. In 2020, all three locations were acquired by Danielle and David Hulton of Ada's Technical Books, and the businesses were merged and rebranded. Fuel has used coffee by Caffé Vita, and the food menu has included pastries and pies. The business has garnered a generally positive reception.

== Description and history ==
Fuel Coffee is a small chain of coffee shops in Seattle, with three locations. Dani Cone opened the original location on Capitol Hill in 2005. Additional shops followed in Montlake and Wallingford in 2006 and April 2007, respectively. Fuel's logo is inspired by Gulf Oil imagery, and the cafes display gasoline-related objects.

In 2006, Claudia Rowe of the Seattle Post-Intelligencer described the Capitol Hill location as "librarylike" with cathedral ceilings and local artwork. In May 2020, all three cafes were acquired by spouses Danielle and David Hulton, the owners of Ada's Technical Books. The book store was established in 2010 at the Loveless Building designed by Arthur Loveless and moved in 2013 to a 15th Avenue building constructed in 1922 that had previously been the location of Horizon Books from 1971 to 2009. The two businesses were merged and rebranded as Fuel Coffee & Books, and the cafes received remodels.

Fuel has used coffee from Caffé Vita Coffee Roasting Company, where Cone used to work as a barista. The business has used flash brewing systems and a Kyotobot for cold brews. In addition to coffee drinks, Fuel's menu has included pastries as well as pies from High 5 Pie, which is also owned by Cone. Cone has also served Fuel at her Cone & Steiner stores. On April 20, 2026, it was announced that Ada’s Technical Books & Cafe on Capitol Hill would close in June of that year and that the Montlake and Wallingford Fuel locations had been put up for sale. The Capitol Hill property is to be retained and the coworking space there is to continue operating.

== Reception ==
Lonely Planet Seattle has said of the 19th Avenue location: "For once a cafe that doesn't try too hard to be cool. Fuel has a tangible community feel, retro gas-station motifs and great coffee." Seattle Metropolitan has said of Fuel: "What this student-oriented upstart coffee house lacks in warm-n-cozy it more than makes up for with its fine smooth coffee".

In 2006, the Seattle Post-Intelligencer's Claudia Rowe said Fuel offered "superior" coffee and "unfailingly friendly" service. She opined, "Though pastries here are sometimes hit or miss, the orange-chocolate loaf and the cranberry almond muffin are outstanding." In 2017, Alexa Peters of Seattle Magazine recommended the Wallingford location for productivity and wrote, "The only downside is that this locale is a little smaller and tables can fill up fast."

== See also ==
- List of coffeehouse chains
- List of restaurant chains in the United States
