= Josiah Failing =

American politician

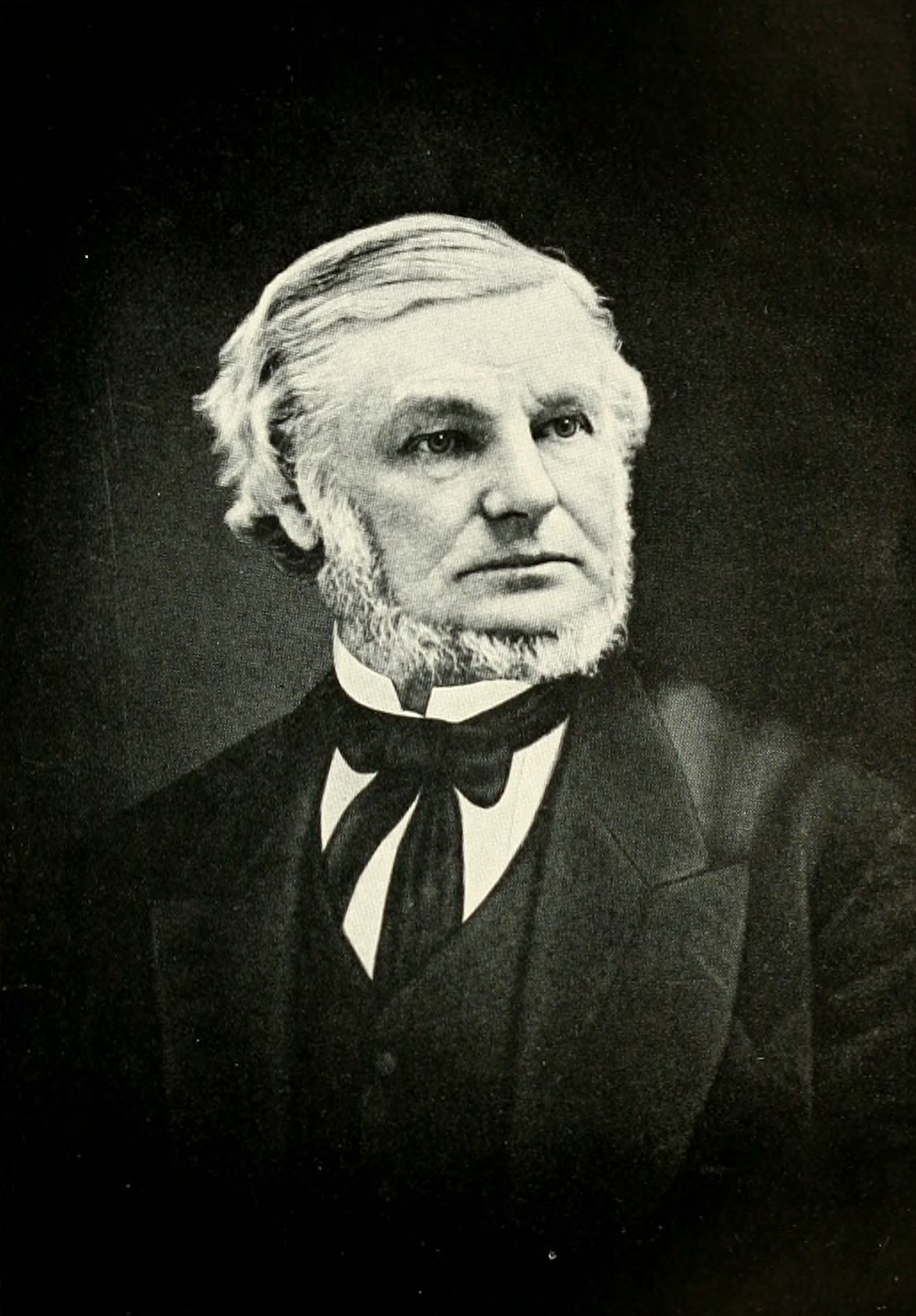

4th Mayor of Portland, Oregon
- In office 1853–1854
- Preceded by: Simon B. Marye
- Succeeded by: William S. Ladd

Personal details
- Born: July 9, 1806 Canajoharie, New York
- Died: August 14, 1877 (aged 71) Portland, Oregon
- Party: Republican

Josiah Failing (July 9, 1806 – August 14, 1877) was a businessman and the fourth mayor of Portland, Oregon, United States. Born in New York, he moved to Portland when it was still a small town of a few hundred. He and his son Henry, who also became a noted businessman and mayor of the city, started a general merchandising business that became very successful.

== Early life ==
Josiah Failing was born in Canajoharie, New York, on July 9, 1806. His ancestors were German Palatines who settled in the Mohawk Valley of New York in the early part of the 18th century. He was raised on a farm. Early in life he went to Albany, to learn the trade of paper stainer, and in 1824, accompanied his employer in a move to New York City. There he married Henrietta Ellison on June 15, 1828. Henrietta was of English and Dutch ancestry. They had 11 children.

Failing served his apprenticeship in New York and followed his trade until forced to abandon it on account of ill health. He then engaged in the trucking business, following this line of work for many years. During this period he served for several years as superintendent of public vehicles of the city.

== Rise to prominence in Portland, Oregon ==
Through letters from early Baptist missionaries, Failing had been fascinated by the Oregon Country for 20 years when he moved his family there in 1851. The move was risky for a family of modest means, but represented a fresh start. While the family only intended to stay for a few years or less, they settled in Portland. After waiting five months for his supplies to arrive, Failing established the mercantile firm of J. Failing & Company with three years of store supplies worth $25,000 from "merchant-shipper-capitalist" C. W. Thomas's Hunt, Thomas & Company, as well as East Coast-backed credit, providing a huge advantage over their competitors who were mainly working on consignment. They located the store diagonally across the street from the business of Henry W. Corbett, a future U.S. Senator with whom the Failing business would later partner. Spring 1853 was problematic, with three shiploads of goods being lost, and the replacements were too late for the busy spring season. Josiah spent less time in his store, not comfortable with the monopolistic practices used by his competitors, turning the business operations over to his son Henry.

Failing's arrival coincided with a period of rapid changes and growth in Portland, and he became thoroughly identified with the city's progress, and engaged in the management of its public affairs. On April 4, 1853, he was elected as the fourth mayor of Portland. He was particularly concerned with education, was a member of the Portland Public Schools board from 1856-1862 and 1864-1868, and devoted much of his time to their establishment and management. Failing started the local chapter of the Sons of Temperance in 1856.

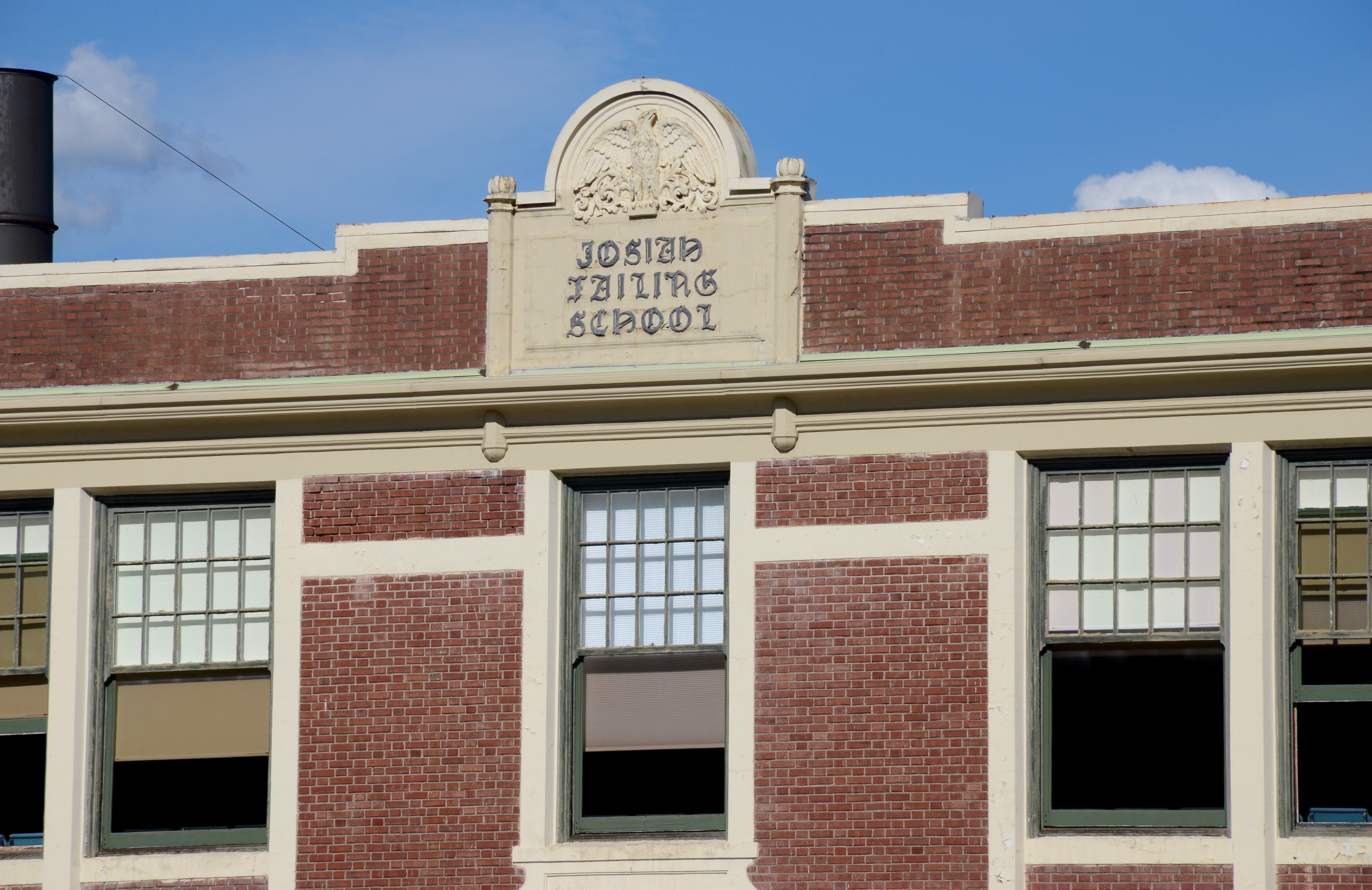
The main building of the National College of Natural Medicine, in South Portland, was originally an elementary school named for Josiah Failing.

Josiah Failing's business split from C. W. Thomas in 1859, giving all profits to Failing after then. He remained with his business until 1864, when, having acquired a modest competency, he retired from active business. Another source has Josiah leaving the business to Henry as early as 1853, when a New York partner advised a business practice with which he was uncomfortable.

An enthusiastic Republican, Failing was a delegate to the 1864 Republican National Convention which nominated Abraham Lincoln for a second term, and to the 1868 convention that nominated Ulysses S. Grant. From the time he retired from business until his death on August 14, 1877, he devoted his time to religious and philanthropic work. He was a Baptist. He is buried at River View Cemetery, which was founded by his son Henry and other prominent Portland citizens. Failing School was named in his honor in 1882–83, and the name carried over to a replacement built in 1912, which still stands and is currently the National University of Natural Medicine. Failing Street in Northeast Portland carries his family's name.

| Preceded by Simon B. Marye | Mayor of Portland, Oregon; 1853–1854 | Succeeded by William S. Ladd |
