= Myra Albert Wiggins =

American photographer (1869–1956)

- Born: Myra Jane Albert; December 15, 1869; Salem, Oregon, US
- Died: January 13, 1956 (aged 86); Seattle, Washington, US
- Known for: Photography, Painting
- Movement: Photo-Secession
- Spouse: Frederick Arthur Wiggins (m. 1894–1956)

Myra Albert Wiggins (1869–1956) was an American painter and pictorial photographer who became a member of the important early 20th century Photo-Secession movement.

== Life ==
=== Early years (1869–89) ===
Wiggins, née Myra Jane Albert, was born on December 15, 1869, in Salem, Oregon. She was the second of four children born to John Henry Albert and Mary Elizabeth Holman. Her father worked his way from being a bookkeeper in a local linseed oil company to becoming president of the Capital National Bank in Salem.

She showed natural artistic talent at an early age, and she would spend hours drawing and painting both in her home and in the fields around Salem. Her parents encouraged her talent both because she was very good and because a cultural background in the arts was expected for upper class women of the time. When she was 17, she won the first of many awards for painting at the Oregon State Fair, and between 1886 and 1907 she won a total of 94 more state fair awards for her art.

About 1888 she met her future husband, Frederick Arthur Wiggins, who was the owner of a local store that was one of the first to offer a variety of products under one roof. Among the products he offered were bicycles, which at that time were first becoming a craze among younger people, and Myra recalled that she first met Fred while riding around town on her bicycle. Their families were very active in outdoor activities, and several times a year they would see each other at outings in the area.

Wiggins said that her introduction to photography was her brother's doing since he wanted to take a photograph of his sweetheart and, not having a camera, thought their father would be more likely to buy one if both of them said they would use it. In 1889, they acquired a large glass-plate camera and tripod, and soon she was using it far more than her brother. Some of her first pictures were taken on one of her family's many trips to the Oregon Coast.

Within two years she won a new camera as first prize in the amateur division of a competition held by West Shore magazine, and many of the photographs she submitted for the contest were exhibited at the Portland North Pacific Industrial Exposition in 1890.

=== Becoming an artist (1890–99) ===
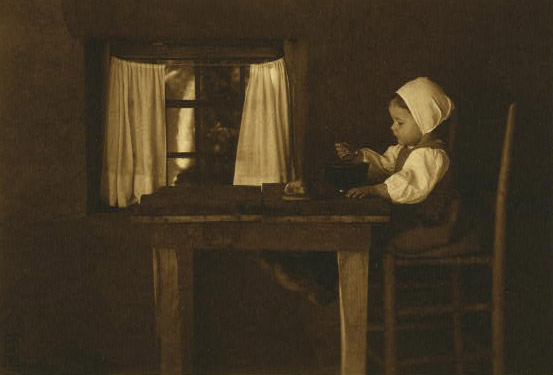
Myra Albert Wiggins: Hunger is the Best Cook, 1898

Like many progressive women of the late 19th century, Myra was sent to New York City for her higher education. She studied at the Art Students League of New York from 1891 to 1894, where she took classes from William Merritt Chase and John Twachtman. Chase in particular influenced her thinking about art, and when she brought her photographs for him to view he would sometimes write comments on the back of them. She immortalized Chase in a famous 1891 photograph of the artist teaching at the league, surrounded by his female students.

While she was studying in New York, she would return to Salem during the summers, and in the summer of 1892, she announced her engagement to Fred Wiggins. When she returned to New York that fall, she became one of the first female members of the New York Camera Club. She used the club's darkroom facilities, and it was here that she met Joseph Keiley, an influential photographer, writer, and close friend of Alfred Stieglitz.

She and her fiancé were married on November 24, 1894, in Salem, and their daughter Mildred, their only child, was born in 1896.

=== Master of photography (1900–29) ===
In 1900, Wiggins was given first of two one-woman exhibitions of her photography at the Chicago Art Institute. She had already met and corresponded with the most important photographer of the time, Alfred Stieglitz, and in 1903 he admitted her as a member in the newly formed Photo-Secession.

In the fall of 1903, one of Wiggins photographs was included in the Hamburg Jubilee Exhibition in Hamburg, Germany, and in the London Salon organized by the famous Linked Ring. A review of the latter exhibition in the British magazine Photography contains these words of praise:

"All things considered, we consider Mrs. Wiggins' picture called Polishing Brass one of the finest in the whole room. It certainly is the most pictorial, and is exactly like a print by Chodowiecke [sic], both in subject and feeling. A woman is seated at a table with metal utensils of quaint and interesting form. The whole thing is quiet, healthy, and exceedingly well-designed – an example for hundreds."

In 1904, Wiggins was one of five Oregon delegates selected to go on a "Cruise of the Christians" to attend the World's Fourth Sunday School Convention in Jerusalem. She photographed scenes both on the boat and when she arrived, often developing the film in her room at night. On the return trip she stopped in Paris and London specifically to see major photographic salons that were on exhibit at the time. Later that year she published Letters from a Pilgrim (Salem: Statesman Publishing), a photographically illustrated description of her journey to the Middle East.

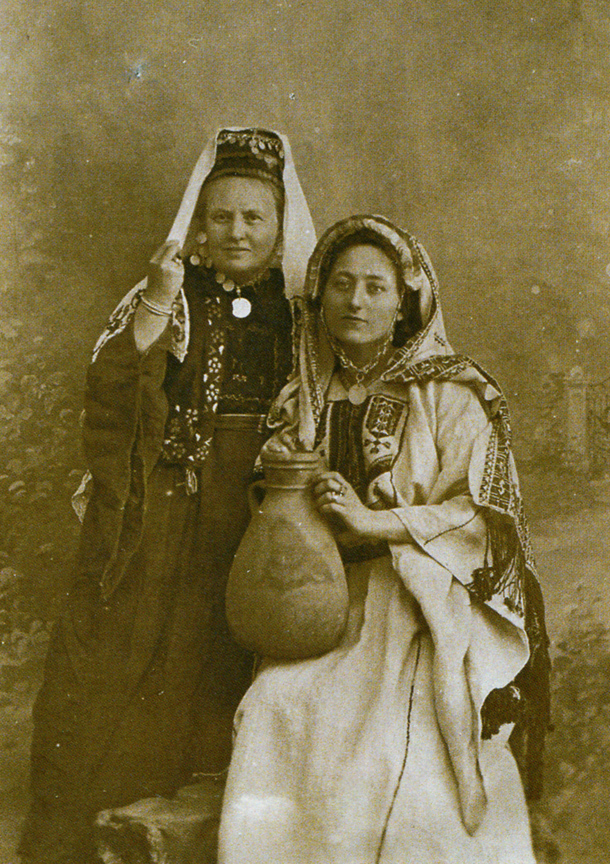
Myra Albert Wiggins: Two Pilgrims (self-portrait of Wiggins on the right). Published in her book Letters from a Pilgrim, 1904

That same year, Stieglitz sent 200 photographs representing the best artists of the Photo-Secession to the Hague International Photography Exhibition. Among those artists he included were Wiggins and her Oregon colleague Sarah Ladd. Wiggins also had photographs published in several important magazines, including Photo-Era, The Photo Miniature, Photograms of the Year and Die Kunst in Der Photographie (a high quality German quarterly similar to Camera Work).

Wiggins' mother Mary died in 1905 after being in a car wreck. Her father, who was driving, was not injured, but he suffered greatly from guilt and anguish in the following years.

In 1906, she was included in the invitational exhibit "The Work of Women Photographers of America" at the Camera Club of Hartford, Connecticut. Wiggins was one of 26 women who were presented in the show. Later that year two of her photographs were included in the annual members exhibit at Stieglitz's Little Galleries of the Photo-Secession in New York.

By 1907, Fred Wiggins wanted to enter the plant nursery business and he moved his family to Toppenish in central Washington. Fred started the Washington Nursery Company, and Wiggins tried to help her husband financially by opening an art studio and school. Her new hometown area was much more rural and undeveloped than Salem, and much of the countryside around the town was dry and dusty. The dust caused health problems for Wiggins, and it was several years before she could produce a regular income from her painting.

Wiggins continued to photograph as much as her health allowed, and she exhibited again at the Little Galleries in New York and at the Arts and Crafts Exhibition in San Francisco. Fellow Photo-Secessionist Anne Brigman commented on Wiggins' photos in the latter show, saying she "invariably infuses her work with an atmosphere of tender sadness."

Over the next decade Wiggins' photos were shown in many important exhibitions, including the International Exhibition of Pictorial Photography in New York City (1909), the Annual Pictorial Photography Invitation in Seattle, Washington (1910) and the landmark International Exhibition of Pictorial Photography (1910) at the Albright-Knox Art Gallery in Buffalo, New York. Encouraged by the interest in her work by other photographers in Seattle, Wiggins started to spend more time in that city.

From the mid-1910s to the late 1920s, she alternated between helping her husband with his business and taking her photographs to Seattle when there was enough money to go. During this time she also developed an interest in lecturing about her work, other photographers and about art in general.

In 1928, the Seattle Fine Arts Society gave Wiggins her last one-woman photography exhibit.

=== Master of painting (1930–56) ===
In 1930, Wiggins co-founded the Women Painters of Washington, one of the state's oldest existing arts organizations. Through her lecturing and classes, she became a vital force in most of the region's arts activities. In 1932 she moved permanently to the Loveless Building in Seattle.

She continued to paint for many years and was recognized for her artistry through retrospective exhibits at the Seattle Art Museum (1953) and the de Young Museum in San Francisco (1954). She also had one-person shows of her paintings in Vancouver, Chicago, New Orleans, Louisiana, and New York. By the time she turned 86 in 1955, she had completed 114 paintings.

On January 13, 1956, Wiggins died of a stroke. She was actively painting up until the time of her death. Her husband died in an accident four months later.

Her work is in the permanent collections several important museums, including the Portland Art Museum, the Getty Museum and the National Museum of American Art at the Smithsonian Institution.

== Exhibitions ==
From February 14 – April 26, 2015 the Hallie Ford Museum of Art at Willamette University exhibited Myra Albert Wiggins: A Photographer's Life. The exhibition was accompanied by two lectures by curators Carole Glauber (A Life in Pictures: Myra Albert Wiggins) and Roger Hull (Art References, Art Echoes in the Photography of Myra Albert Wiggins).

From February 27 – May 3, 2026, the Musée d'Orsay exhibited Myra Albert Wiggins and her time. The exhibit celebrated the donation of ten of her prints to the Musée and was shown “in dialogue with works by contemporary male and female artists, representatives of the international pictorialism promoted by Stieglitz.”
