= Colman Building =

Historic building in Seattle, Washington

- U.S. National Register of Historic Places
- Seattle Landmark
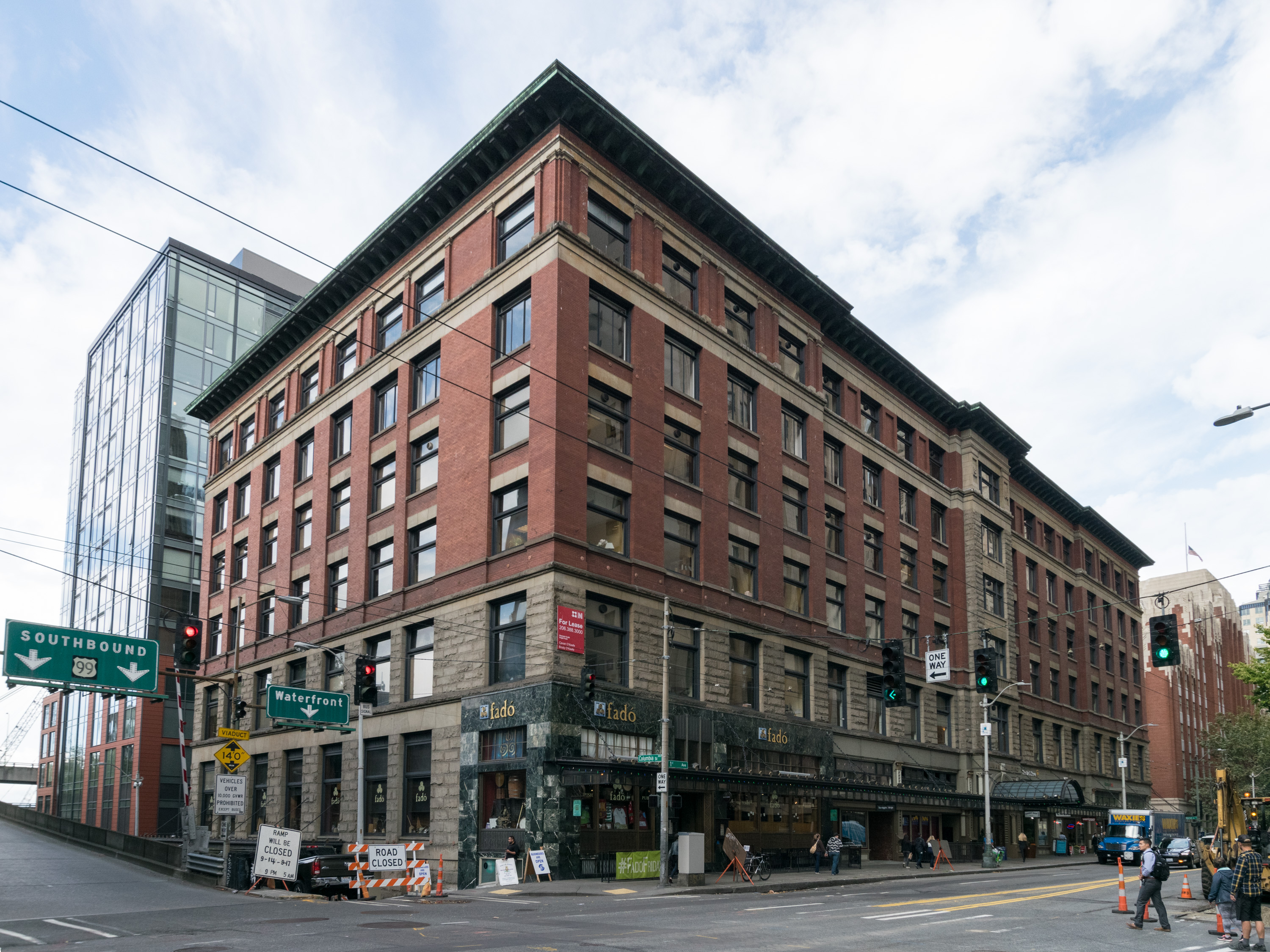

- Location within Downtown Seattle
- Location: 811 1st Ave. Seattle, Washington
- Coordinates: 47°36′12.80″N 122°20′8.07″W
- Built: 1889-90, 1904–6
- Architect: Stephen Meany, August Tidemand
- Architectural style: Romanesque, Chicago School
- NRHP reference No.: 72001272

Significant dates
- Added to NRHP: March 16, 1972
- Designated SEATL: March 19, 1990

The Colman Building is a historic office building on First Avenue in downtown Seattle, Washington. It occupies a half of a block in proximity to Pioneer Square, and is bound by First Avenue, Marion, and Columbia Streets. It is listed on the National Register of Historic Places and is a City of Seattle landmark.

The building was built in several stages with a change of design between 1889 and 1906. It was commissioned by Scottish immigrant and master machinist James Murray Colman who arrived in Seattle in 1872 and would later build Seattle's first brick office building (1875) and Colman Dock which originally was the city's main coal shipping point. Colman owned large tracts of lands along Seattle's waterfront and was instrumental in bringing the first railroad (Seattle and Walla Walla Railroad) to the city as well as helping start the city's first street car line.

Architect Stephen J. Meany drew the original plans in a Victorian style while the reconstruction that is visible today was the work of August Tidemand, inspired by the Chicago School with less ornamentation and large pivoting windows. The architectural cast-iron elements from the original design remain on the first floor, while the second floor was re-faced rusticated stone. Four floors of red brick trimmed with marble were built on top of this. The building is crowned with a copper cornice. The Colman building was one of the largest office buildings in Seattle in the 1900s and was the centerpiece of Colman's multi-million dollar estate at the time of his death in 1906 shortly after its completion.

== History ==
=== James Colman and the first Colman Building ===
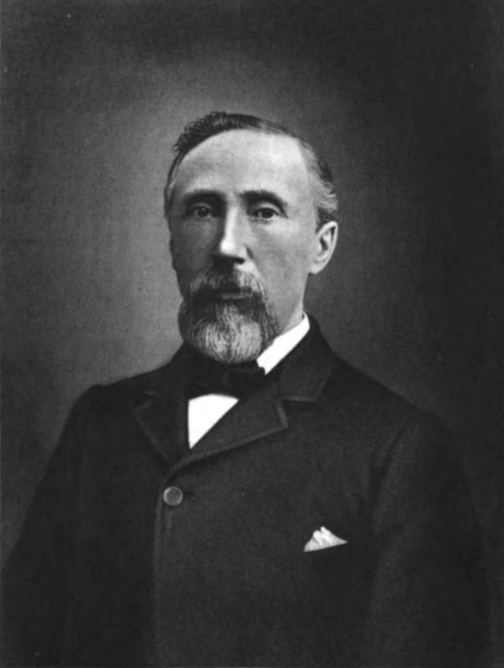
James Murray Colman

Among his numerous land holdings along Seattle's waterfront, James Colman owned the entire block of First Avenue between Columbia and Marion Streets. According to legend, he came to acquire the property when he towed the wrecked ship Windward to shore there intending to salvage it. When the Colman building was later built on the site, the ship's hull was surrounded by land and buried under the foundation where it is said to still lie in the sub-basement. By the mid 1880s Colman had built up the lot with a uniform row of 2-story wood frame shops, occupied by everything from fruit sellers to undertakers and one of the earliest permanent locations of Seattle's YMCA.

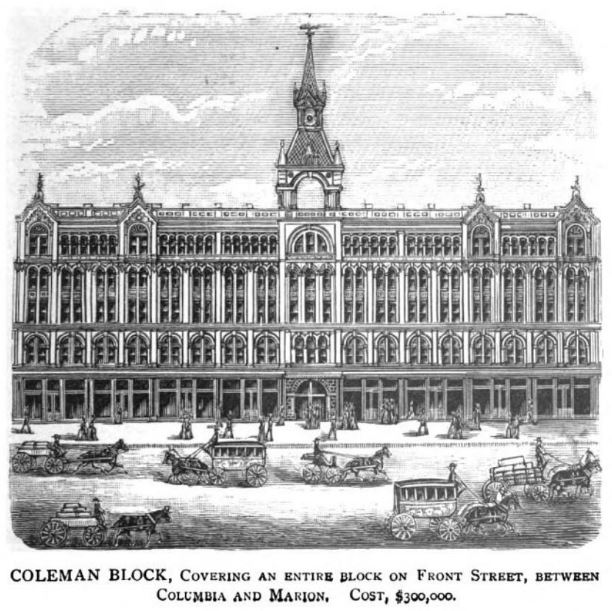
Stephen Meany's original design for the Colman Building

In 1888, Colman commissioned architect Stephen Meany to design a large office building that would occupy his property. Meany's design was of an ornate five story brick Victorian/Romanesque edifice trimmed in cast iron and faced in cement and would feature a large central tower. While the cornerstone was laid and foundation begun in early 1889, a shortage of stone plaguing the city forced Colman to put off construction in order to keep collecting rents on buildings still on the property as long as possible. Construction of the building was made easier when the Great Seattle Fire of 1889 wiped out all of the buildings on the block. Construction commenced as soon as the debris was cleared.

During the rebuilding of Seattle in the aftermath of the fire, a huge surplus of office space was being created with all of the multi-story structures being built simultaneously. Noticing this, Colman halted construction of the building, which had only reached its second floor. It remained in this unfinished form for the next fifteen years. Despite its stunted growth, the Colman became an important business address in the city and housed many notable businesses and social clubs like the Elks and the Seattle Bureau of Information, whose sole purpose was to keep the newspapers in on the East coast supplied with good news about the city. The Customs House operated within the Colman Building as well as the Circuit Court. Architect Meany moved his offices into the building and The Dexter Horton Bank, a predecessor to Seafirst Bank, relocated to the building in 1890 while their new building was being built.

In July 1895 the corrugated iron-clad warehouses occupying the other half of the block burned to the ground. Colman replaced them with a 3-story stone warehouse building, known as The Colman Block Annex, which eventually functioned for many years as a candy factory, before being demolished in the mid-20th century for a parking lot. Today, this is the site of Griffis Seattle Waterfront (Formerly known as The Post Apartments.)

=== Reconstruction ===
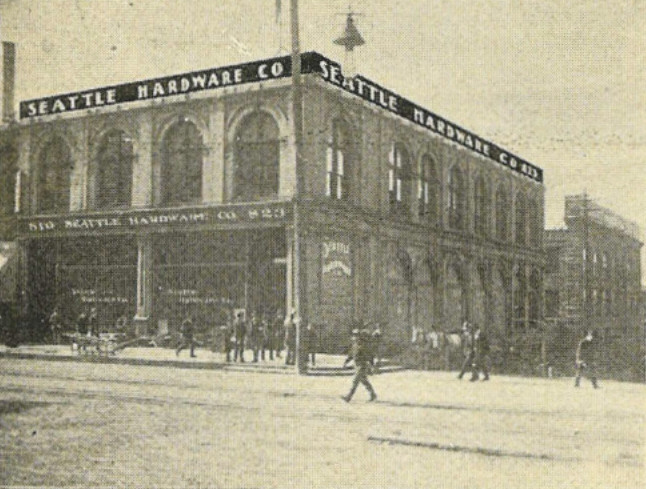
A portion of the original Colman Building c. 1900

Construction of the Colman Building was finally resumed in February 1904 and by this time, architectural tastes had changed, and Colman hired Norwegian architect August Tidemand, who had designed the Colman Block Annex ten years prior, to completely rebuild the building in a Chicago School style while still echoing the building's intended 1889 layout. Tenants were moved to the nearby Burke Building until construction finished. Perks of the new building would include 300 offices, fireproof construction and stair fire escapes. Another improvement over the old building would be the addition of three elevators with 24-hour operators. As construction began in early 1904 The Seattle Times noted the improved service over that of the Colman Building at the time:

In speaking of the new elevator service to be employed in this building recalls the fact that the lone elevator now used holds the record of being the slowest on earth.

Reconstruction of the building involved removing most of the brick facade and arches to be replaced with stone, with the floors above to be executed in brick trimmed with stone, all crowned by a projecting copper cornice. Several cast-iron elements from Meany's original design including the entrance arch and storefront columns were retained and integrated into the new facade. When completed in 1906, the new building rose six stories high and cost $150,000.

The Colman Building housed several businesses that catered to miners during the Alaska Gold Rush as well as housing several administrative offices for the Alaska-Yukon-Pacific Exposition in 1908-9. The Colman Building housed the flagship store of Augustine & Kyer, one of Seattle's leading early twentieth-century grocers, whose store eventually occupied nearly an acre of the building.

The lobby of the building was completely rebuilt in 1930 with designs by Seattle architect Arthur Loveless.

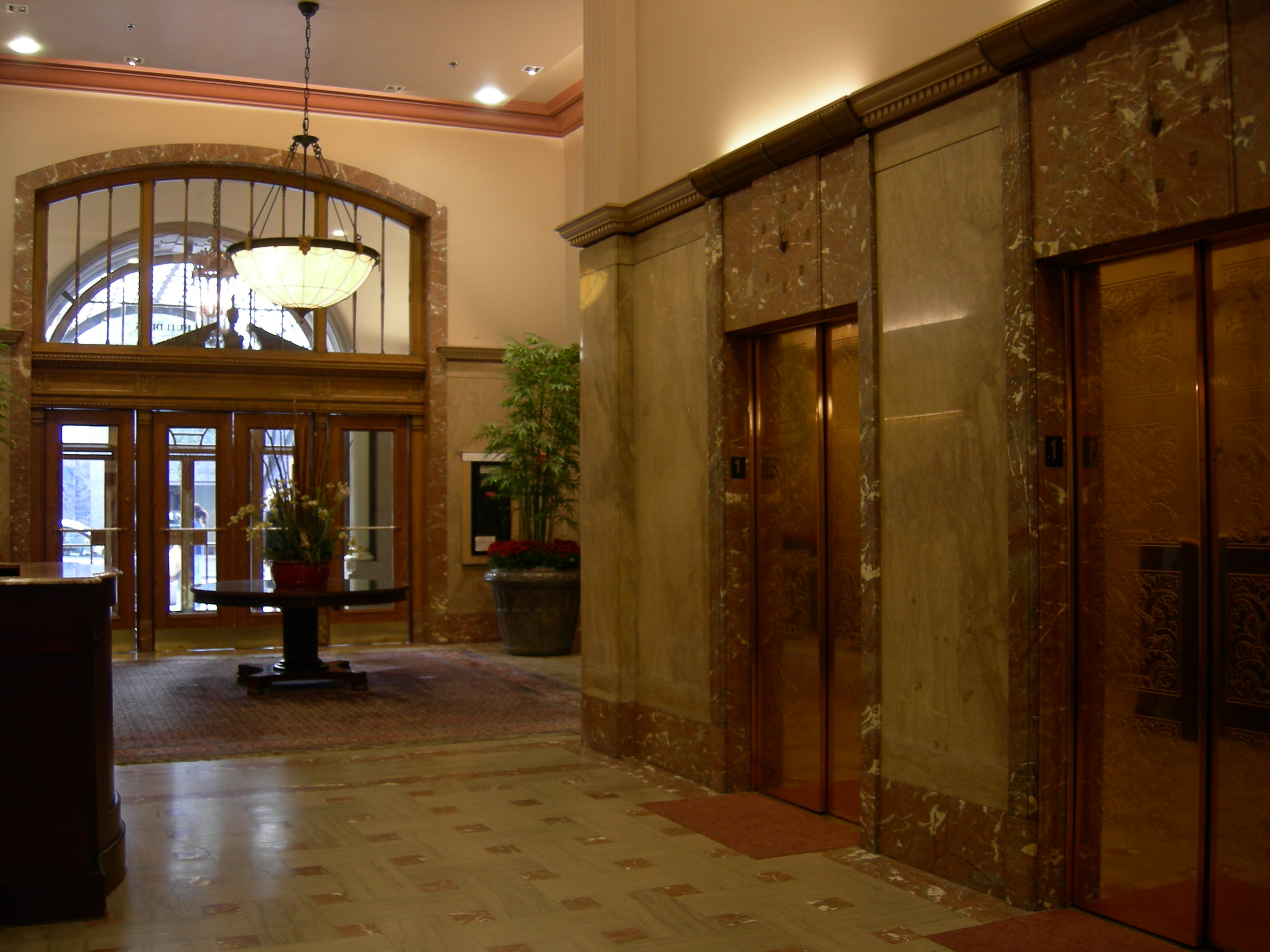
Colman Building lobby

=== Recent history ===
On March 16, 1972, the Colman Building was listed on the National Register of Historic Places. In October 1978, the building was purchased by CHG-City Center Investors, who began a ten-year, three phase process of restoring the building to its original grandeur. On March 19, 1990, the Colman Building became a City of Seattle Landmark (Ordinance #114993) on nomination by CHG International of Federal Way, Washington, with James Mason as their agent.

The Colman Building was brought back to local ownership in 1997 when Triad Development purchased the building for $7.1 million from Plaza Realty Holdings Inc. of Long Beach, California. They had in turn purchased the building out of foreclosure in 1996. Triad spent over $2 million in renovations including new air conditioning and better interior lighting as well improving street level businesses. In 2019, Unico Properties purchased the Colman Building for approximately $37 million.

== See also ==
- Colman Dock
- National Register of Historic Places listings in King County, Washington#Seattle
- List of landmarks in Seattle
