= Simon B. Marye =

American lawyer

3rd Mayor of Portland, Oregon
- In office 1852–1853
- Preceded by: A. C. Bonnell
- Succeeded by: Josiah Failing

Personal details
- Born: Hillside, Shenandoah County, Virginia, United States
- Died: February 19, 1868 Butte, Montana, United States
- Spouse: Sarah Chapman
- Profession: Lawyer

Simon Bolivar Marye was an American politician and lawyer. He served as Portland, Oregon's third mayor in 1852 and 1853, after the unexpected resignation of A. C. Bonnell. He took office on November 15, 1852. He was an attorney before the Supreme Court of the Territory of Oregon in December 1851. During three months in late 1864, Marye ran "contraband cotton and other needed items for use behind the lines for the Confederacy." He was practicing law in Vicksburg, Mississippi, at the time of his death.

| Preceded by A. C. Bonnell | Mayor of Portland, Oregon; 1852–1853 | Succeeded by Josiah Failing |
