= A. C. Bonnell =

American politician and businessman

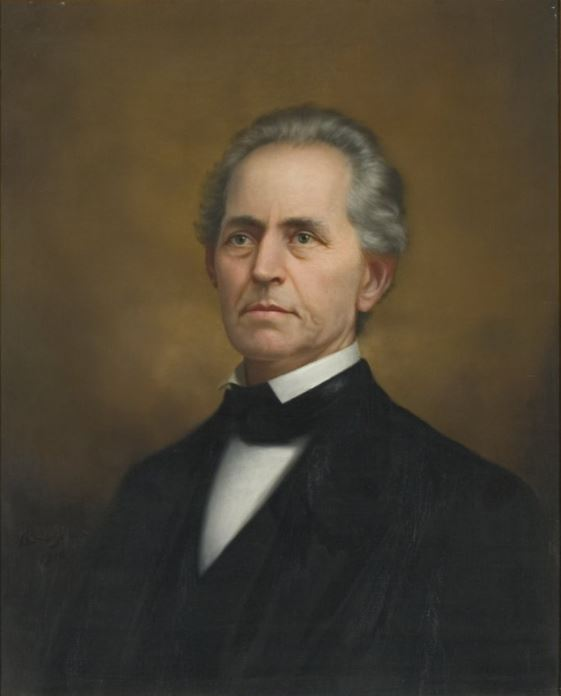

2nd Mayor of Portland, Oregon
- In office April 1852 – November 1852
- Preceded by: Hugh D. O'Bryant
- Succeeded by: Simon B. Marye

Recorder of Portland
- In office April 1853 – July 1853
- Preceded by: C. B. Pillow
- Succeeded by: A. P. Dennison

Personal details
- Born: March 16, 1801 near Chatham, New Jersey, United States
- Died: August 16, 1875 (aged 74) San Francisco, California, United States
- Spouse: Catherine Hough Looker
- Children: 6

Allison Clark Bonnell (March 16, 1801 – August 16, 1875), better known as A. C. Bonnell, was an American politician and businessman who served as the second mayor of Portland, Oregon, in 1852.

== Early life ==
Bonnell was born near Chatham, New Jersey, on March 16, 1801 to Aaron Bonnell and Rachel Clark. From 1817 to 1829, he lived in Brookville, Indiana. In 1829, he moved to Cincinnati, Ohio and served as a deputy sheriff and as a county recorder. In the 1840s, he worked in the retail business.

Bonnell moved west to San Francisco on November 1, 1849.

== Career ==
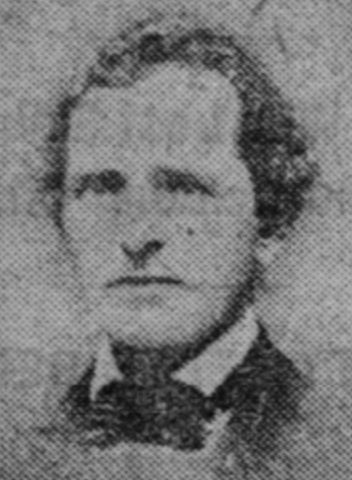
A. C. Bonnell as Mayor

Either in late 1849 or early 1850, he began working as a recorder clerk in the administration of mayor John W. Geary until August of that year, when he moved to Portland, Oregon.

Bonnell owned a lumber mill, which burned down in 1856.

=== Portland mayor and recorder ===
In 1852, Bonnell was elected as Portland's second mayor, succeeding Hugh O'Bryant. He served as mayor for six months, then resigned to take a long business trip.

In April 1853, after his return, Bonnell was elected to the position of city recorder. He served for three months.

== Later life ==
In 1856, after his lumber mill burned down, Bonnell moved permanently to San Francisco. There he served as the clerk and cashier of the San Francisco Evening Bulletin. He died there in 1875 and is buried at Woodlawn Memorial Park in Colma.

== Personal life ==
Bonnell married Catherine Hough Looker on November 1, 1835 in Cincinnati. They had 6 children together.

Preceded by Hugh D. O'Bryant	Mayor of Portland, Oregon; 1852	Succeeded by Simon B. Marye
