= Under U 4 Men =

Retail outlet based in Portland, Oregon, U.S.

Coordinates: 45.5202°N 122.6825°W

- Logo

- Exterior of the shop on Morrison Street, 2026
- Founded: 2006; 20 years ago in Portland, Oregon, United States
- Founder: Steven Lien
- Headquarters: 1013 Southwest Morrison Street, Portland, Oregon, United States
- Website: underu4men.com

Under U 4 Men, stylized as underU4men, is a men's underwear store based in Portland, Oregon, United States. The business was established by Steven Lien in downtown Portland in 2006. Under U 4 Men has an outpost on Seattle's Capitol Hill. Previously, the business also operated at Bridgeport Village, a shopping mall in Tigard and Tualatin, Oregon. It has billed itself as the "largest men's underwear store in North America".

In addition to underwear, Under U 4 Men stocks nightwear, swimsuits, and other clothing and grooming products. The shops have hosted live models and the Portland location has also housed a barber. Under U 4 Men is popular within Portland's gay community and has been showcased in fashion shows. Lien sold the Seattle shop to an employee in 2023. In 2025, he retired and sold the Portland operation to general manager Wesley Bateman, who relocated the shop to a smaller downtown space.

== Description ==
The LGBTQ-owned men's underwear store Under U 4 Men is based in Portland, Oregon. In addition to a storefront in downtown Portland, the business has an outpost in Seattle. Previously, Under U 4 Men also operated at Bridgeport Village, a shopping mall in Tigard and Tualatin. Under U 4 Men has billed itself as the "largest men's underwear store in North America". One guide book by Moon Publications described Under U 4 Men as a "hipper, sportier version of Victoria's Secret—for men".

Under U 4 Men stocks approximately 50 different brands of underwear, in a variety of colors, materials, and shapes. Seattle Metropolitan has said that Under U 4 Men offers "high-quality, fashion-forward men's underwear, from everyday to risqué". Under U 4 Men has also stocked cologne, nightwear, and swimsuits, as well as resort clothing, bondage gear, and products for hair and shaving. The business has "a strong following" within Portland's gay community, according to Fodor's.

In 2006, Byron Beck of Willamette Week said the Portland shop had "scantily clad" staff and male models wearing underwear. The Portland location has also had a barber on-site. In Seattle, Under U 4 Men operates in the Loveless Building on Broadway East, on Capitol Hill. In 2022, the shop was "the only offering of Speedo on the Hill" according to the Seattle Metropolitan.

== History ==
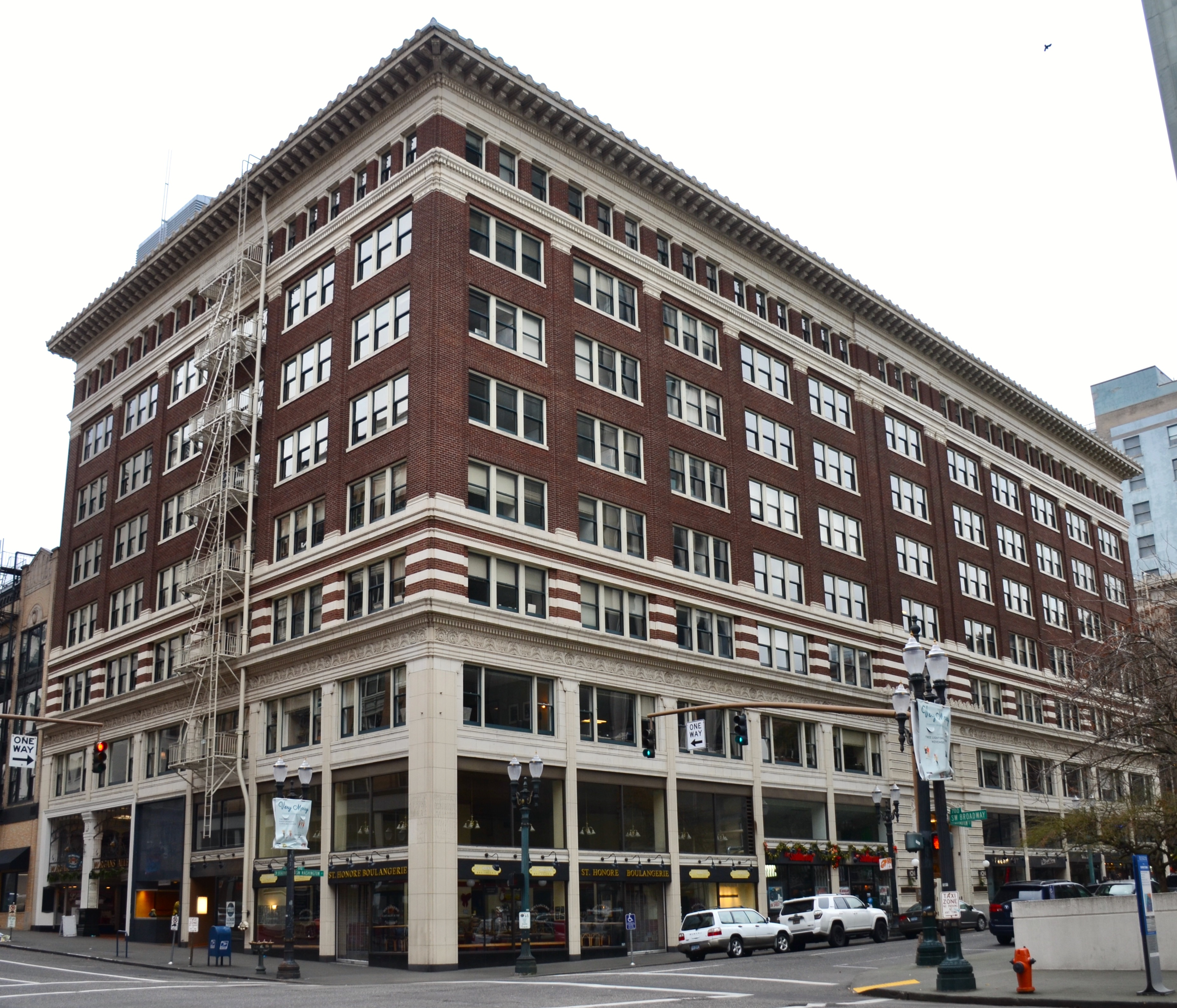
Under U 4 Men opened in the Morgan Building (exterior pictured in 2018) in downtown Portland in 2006.

Exterior of the shop in downtown Portland in 2025

Steven Lien started the business in an 850-square-foot space within the Morgan Building on Broadway, in downtown Portland, in 2006. Andrew Jankowski of Willamette Week said Under U 4 Men began "as a boutique selling designer underwear appealing predominantly to gay men" and "has had a presence in downtown Portland and its gay community since its inception". Early on, Lien did not plan to stock jockstraps, thongs, or "other stripper-friendly items", according to Beck. Lien spearheaded an effort to rename the stretch of Broadway between Alder and Stark streets the "Romance District", on behalf of approximately 20 businesses.

Under U 4 Men was a vendor at the Pride festival organized by Pride Northwest at Tom McCall Waterfront Park in 2007. Willamette Week's Elianna Bar-el said Under U 4 Men was the city's "only hotbox for male underthings" in 2008. Models representing the business wore briefs and bathing suits in a fashion show in Portland in 2008. Fashion designer Andrew Christian made an appearance at the shop in 2009. In 2012, the business consolidated the Bridgeport Village location and other offices into a space on Washington Street, across from the O'Bryant Square (now known as Darcelle XV Plaza). As of 2012, the Portland shop partnered with SmartPark to validate parking for purchases of $25 or more. Lien said 22 employees worked at the Portland shop in 2015.

In Portland, the shop saw an increase in shoplifting, as well as broken windows in the aftermath of the COVID-19 pandemic and George Floyd protests. In July 2020, Lien told The Oregonian he still considered downtown "a desirable and safe place for shoppers during the day". When the shop's windows were broken in 2020, Lien commissioned a mural of George Floyd in support of the Black Lives Matter movement. He also hired security to guard the door and stop theft. The city allowed Under U 4 Men and nearby businesses to use a parking space for curbside pick-up. In mid-2020, Lien said the shop's sales were down 50 percent compared to 2019. He considered a relocation but decided to renew his lease in 2023. The Portland operation included a 5,000-square-foot storefront and an additional 2,300 square feet for e-commerce at the time.

After selling the Seattle shop in 2023, Lien retired in 2025. He sold the Portland operation to longtime employee and general manager Wesley Bateman. On August 26, 2025, the shop hosted a closing party and sale, featuring models. Later in 2025, Bateman relocated the operation from the 7,300-square-foot space at Southwest Park Avenue and Washington Street to a smaller space at Southwest 10th Avenue and Morrison Street. The vintage boutique Shirtzenpantz opened its third location at the former store on Washington Street in 2026.

=== Seattle ===
In Seattle, Under U 4 Men operates in the Loveless Building (exterior pictured in 2017) on Capitol Hill

By 2008, Under U 4 Men was also operating in Seattle. The store hosted weekly shows with live models. In 2011, Under U 4 Men was showcased at Seattle's Metropolitan Fashion Week.

In 2014, Lien was among businesspeople affiliated with the Broadway Business Owners Association on Capitol Hill who spoke out against a minimum wage increase to $15 per hour. He said to Capitol Hill Seattle Blog, "My competitors are web-based retailers based outside to the city of Seattle. A change to $15 per hours is a competitive disadvantage that cannot be overcome. I do not have the ability to raise prices to cover this type of increase." Lien sold the Seattle shop to its general manager in 2023.

== Reception ==
Writing for Willamette Week in 2006, Beck said Under U 4 Men "might be one of the sexiest stores to open in Portland". Alley Hector of QPDX.com opined, "And while what is most exciting about Under U 4 Men isn't innovation... what is exciting is their synthesis of various eye-catching under-products, as well as their mere existence as a stylish and queer presence in the Portland retail fashion scene." Sasha Scarlett of the Portland Mercury said the shop was "awesome" in 2007.
