= Skweezy Jibbs =

- Skweezy Jibbs in a window display in Portland, Oregon, as part of a publicity stunt for his independent film (2026)

Skweezy Jibbs (Tim Savage) is an Internet personality, actor, and comedian. Savage has performed as the character Skweezy Jibbs since 2007. He had approximately 800,000 followers on Instagram in October 2025 and 4 million followers on TikTok in July 2026. In 2020, he visited eleven Wendy's restaurants in a day.

In 2026, Skweezy Jibbs "lived" in a window display at a Shirtzenpantz shop in downtown Portland as a publicity stunt for his film Skweezy Jibbs Makes a Movie. The film is associated with a national tour.

== Personal life ==
Originally from Florida, Savage lived in Portland, Oregon's Lents neighborhood in 2020.

== See also ==
- List of people from Portland, Oregon
