= Darcelle XV Plaza =

Public park in Portland, Oregon, U.S.

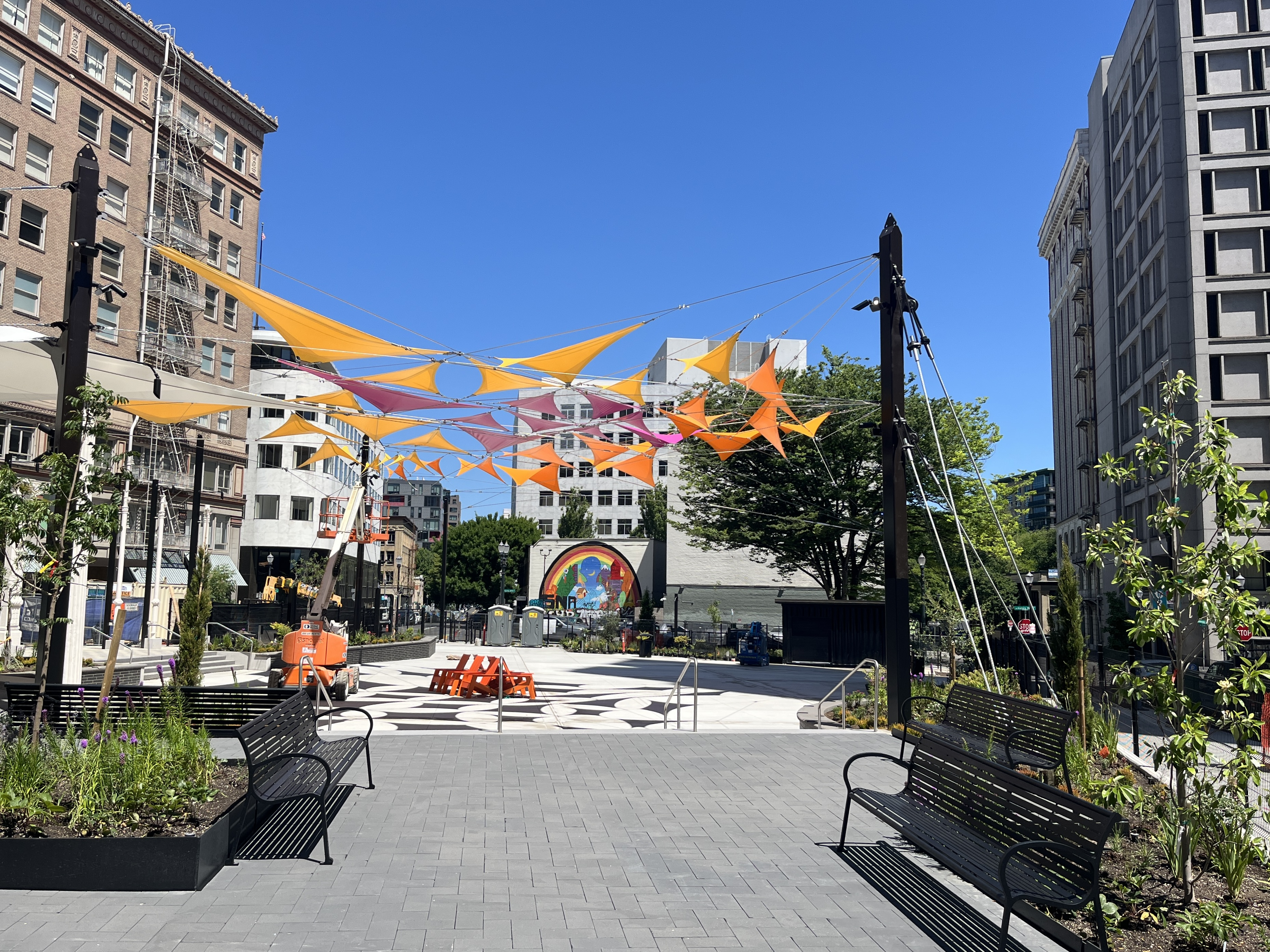
- The plaza in 2026
- Interactive map of Darcelle XV Plaza
- Location: SW Park Ave. and Washington St. Portland, Oregon, U.S.
- Coordinates: 45°31′17″N 122°40′48″W
- Area: 0.46 acres (0.19 ha)
- Created: 1973
- Operator: Portland Parks & Recreation

Darcelle XV Plaza (formerly O'Bryant Square) is a square that was a small park and fountain at the intersection of Southwest Park Avenue and Southwest Harvey Milk Street in downtown Portland, Oregon, in the United States. It received the current name in July 2023. Previously, the park was named after Hugh O'Bryant, Portland's first mayor.

The park has also been known as "Paranoid Park", "Paranoia Park", "Needle Park", and "Crack Park". Aaron Mesh, writing for Willamette Week on an article discussing plans for a park space in Northwest District described city's reluctance to commit to a plaza because "junkie haven O'Bryant Square, or "Paranoid Park"—have been a security hassle."

== History and features ==
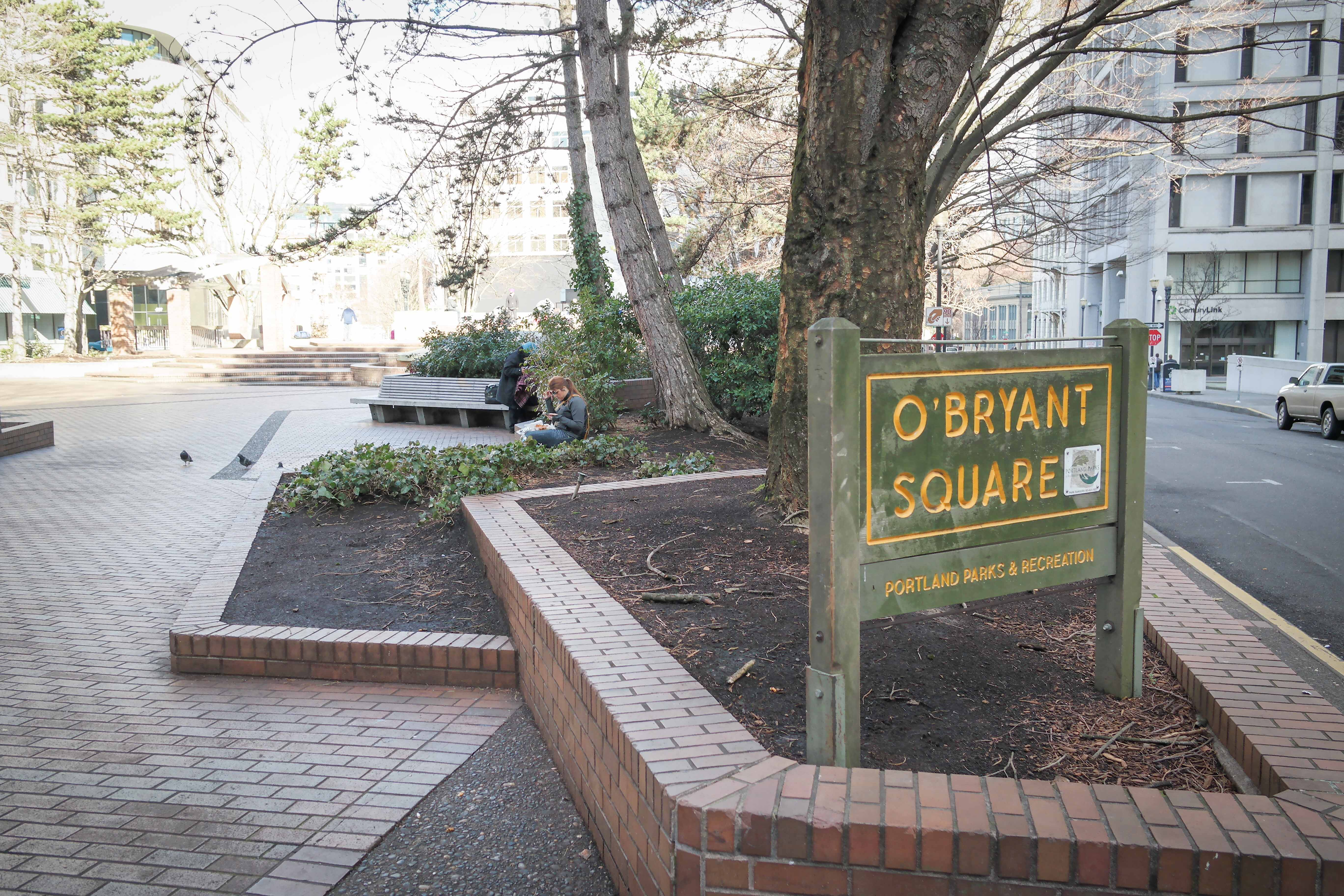
Park sign in 2014

The property, having once contained a quarter-block building and surface parking, was donated to the city by Mr. and Mrs. William E. Roberts In 1971. Development of the park and underground parking cost $1.25 million, backed by federal grants and bonds built on the projected parking revenue.

A bronze fountain titled Fountain to a Rose was built in 1973. It was shaped like a rose and surrounded by 250 rose bushes and other plants. Its inscription read "May you find peace in this garden." The fountain was made possible through a $28,000 bequest from Donald Card Sloan, a former prime minister of the Royal Rosarians. The square and fountain were dedicated in 1973 and the park was named O'Bryant Square for Portland's first Mayor, Hugh D. O'Bryant. It was popular in both the business and planning communities and received a national design award from the United States Department of Housing and Urban Development in 1976.

Laurie Olin was brought on to redesign the park in 2006 when he was designing Director Park. Olin called O'Bryant "a real ugly duckling". In 2007, The Oregonian called it "a relic of 1970s urban design".

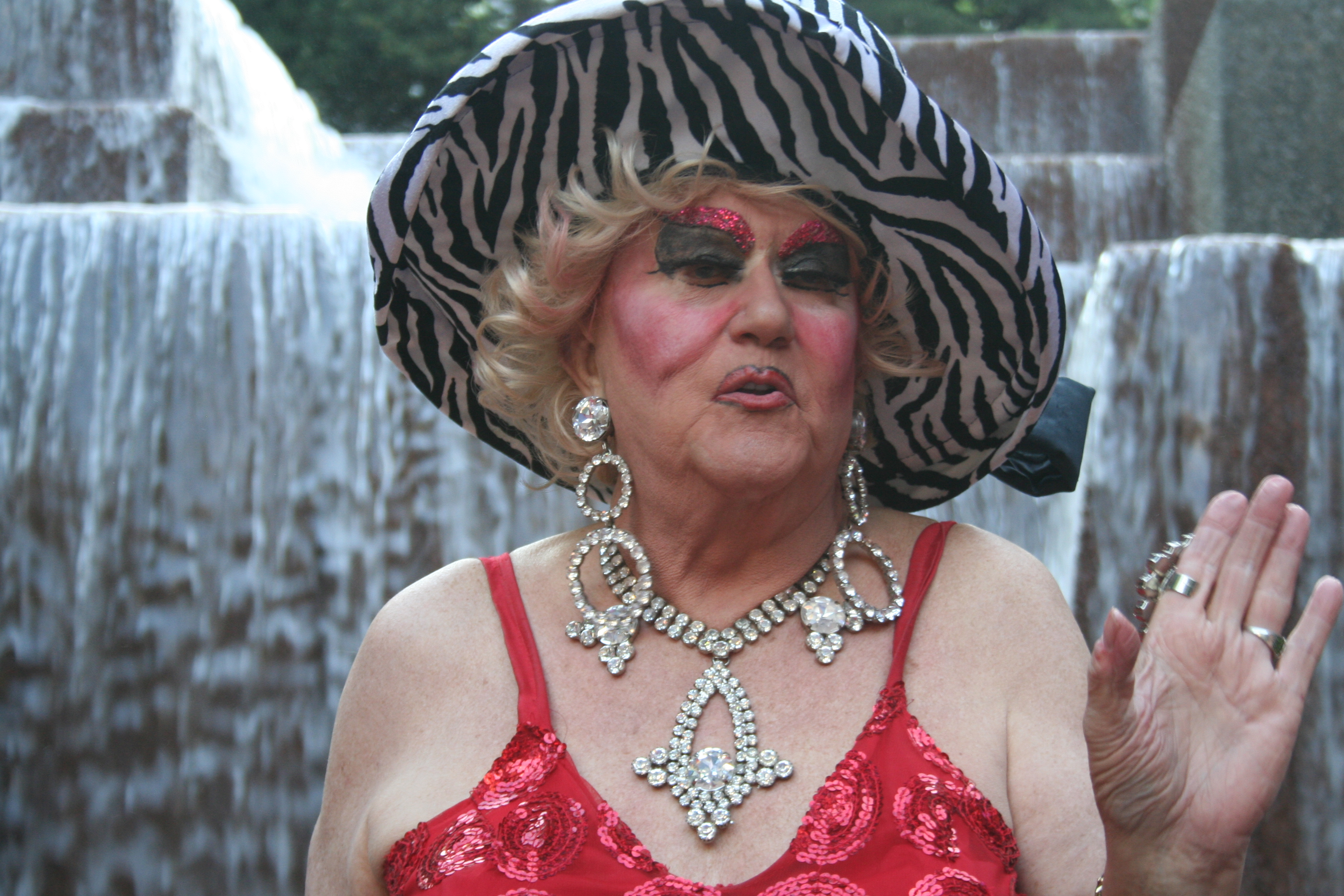
The park commemorates drag performer Darcelle XV (pictured in 2012).

In March 2018, the park was closed indefinitely by the city, citing safety concerns related to structural issues in the underground parking garage. On April 12, 2023, Portland leaders voted to demolish the plaza. Fountain to a Rose was removed in 2023 as part of the park's redevelopment.

On July 13, 2023, the park was renamed Darcelle XV Plaza, in honor of Darcelle XV (1930–2023), who operated the drag venue Darcelle XV Showplace and was certified by the Guinness World Records as the oldest performing drag queen in 2016. The park is in the process of being redeveloped and is set to open in 2025. It will feature a stage and a dog park, as well as a large shade sail covering the center of the park. There are also plans for public art and wall of fame commemorating Portland's LGBTQ community.

== Reception ==
Steve Lien, owner of the nearby men’s underwear store Under U 4 Men and head of the Travel Gay Portland visitor center, called the new plaza design “a place for everyone” and hopes the park will eventually be, “as grand as Darcelle was." Portland Parks foundation director Randy Gragg “hopes (the plaza) can live up to the spirit, verve, excitement and humor of Darcelle." Plans for the park have been criticized for being the first city park in Portland to be fenced in and also for not including food carts after the nearby Ritz Carlton hotel opposed them as potential competition to its own indoor food offerings.
