= Hugh O'Bryant =

American politician

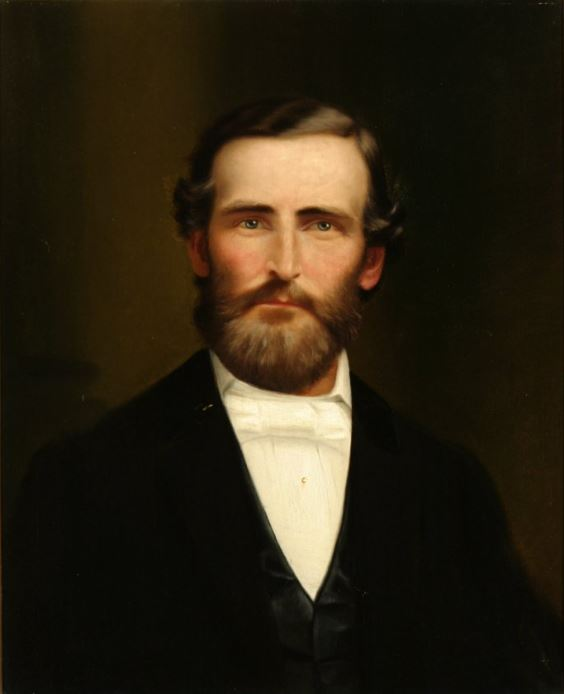

1st Mayor of Portland, Oregon
- In office April 1851 – April 1852
- Preceded by: Position established
- Succeeded by: A. C. Bonnell

Member of the Washington Territorial Legislature
- In office 1866–1869
- Constituency: Walla Walla County

President of the Oregon Territorial Council
- In office 1857–1859
- Preceded by: A. P. Dennison
- Succeeded by: Position abolished (Luther Elkins as President of the Oregon State Senate)

Member of the Oregon Territorial Council
- In office 1855–1859
- Constituency: Umpqua, Douglas, and Coos Counties

Personal details
- Born: December 5, 1813 Franklin County, Georgia, United States
- Died: January 9, 1883 (aged 69) Merced County, California, United States
- Party: Independent (before 1855); Democratic (after 1855)
- Spouse: Matilda Doddridge Walter
- Children: 7

Military service
- Branch/service: United States Army; Oregon Rifles
- Years of service: 1848
- Rank: First Lieutenant
- Battles/wars: Cayuse War

Hugh Donaldson O'Bryant (1813–1883) was an American politician who served as the first mayor of Portland, Oregon, from 1851 to 1852. He later served as the President of the Oregon Territory Council, and as a member of the Washington Territorial Legislature.

== Early life ==
Hugh O’Bryant was born on December 5, 1813 in Franklin County, Georgia, to Duncan O'Bryant and Martha Whitehead. His father was a Methodist missionary, and O'Bryant was raised among the Cherokee Indians due to his father’s missionary work to them beginning in 1821. The state of Georgia began to require all missionaries working with the Cherokees to swear an oath to the state. O'Bryant's father refused and moved his family to Arkansas where he continued his missionary work to the Cherokees until his death in 1834. In early 1843, O'Bryant set out for the Oregon Country, arriving in Oregon City in October 1843.

== Career ==
Upon arriving in Oregon City, O'Bryant set up shop as a merchant. Two years later, he moved across the Willamette River to Portland. In 1847, he volunteered to fight in the Cayuse War after the Whitman massacre, joining the Second Company of the Oregon Riflemen for the Provisional Government of Oregon as a first lieutenant.

In Portland, O'Bryant used his own money to fund the city's first library, located in one room of a business block. He paid for the rent and donated his own materials. He also solicited interested citizens to help donate materials as well. Despite having little formal education, O'Bryant was an advocate for education.

=== Mayor of Portland ===
In 1851, the Oregon Territorial Legislature voted to incorporate the City of Portland. Robert Thompson, Shubrick Norris, Thomas G. Robinson, George A. Barnes, and Loren B. Hastings were all elected councilors. O'Bryant was elected mayor by a mere four votes, defeating challenger Joseph Showalter Smith (who was later elected Oregon's first US Representative). The first meeting of the city council was held on April 14, 1851.

O'Bryant's one-year reign is often known for the failure of Portland's first government to effectively govern the city, leading to a new city charter in 1852. In O'Bryant's only year as mayor, he missed seven out of thirty-one council meetings. Although the council passed resolutions to build roads, build a jail, and purchase a fire engine, none of these materialized under O'Bryant's leadership. Funds for the fire engine were authorized by citywide vote on May 26, 1851, but it was only a week before his term ended, the following March, that O'Bryant notified the council that the bills authorizing this purchase were sitting on his desk, unsigned.

After his term, he performed justice of the peace duties for a short time and provided carpentry services for many new immigrants.

=== Oregon Legislature ===
In 1852, O'Bryant moved to Salem, and then to Roseburg. In 1855, O'Bryant began serving in the Oregon Territorial Council, the upper house of the legislature, as a Democrat. He represented district 8, which covered Umpqua, Douglas, and Coos Counties. He served until Oregon's statehood in 1859, serving as president of the council after 1857.

=== Washington Legislature ===
In 1860, O'Bryant moved to Walla Walla, Washington Territory, where he served in the territorial legislature representing Walla Walla County.

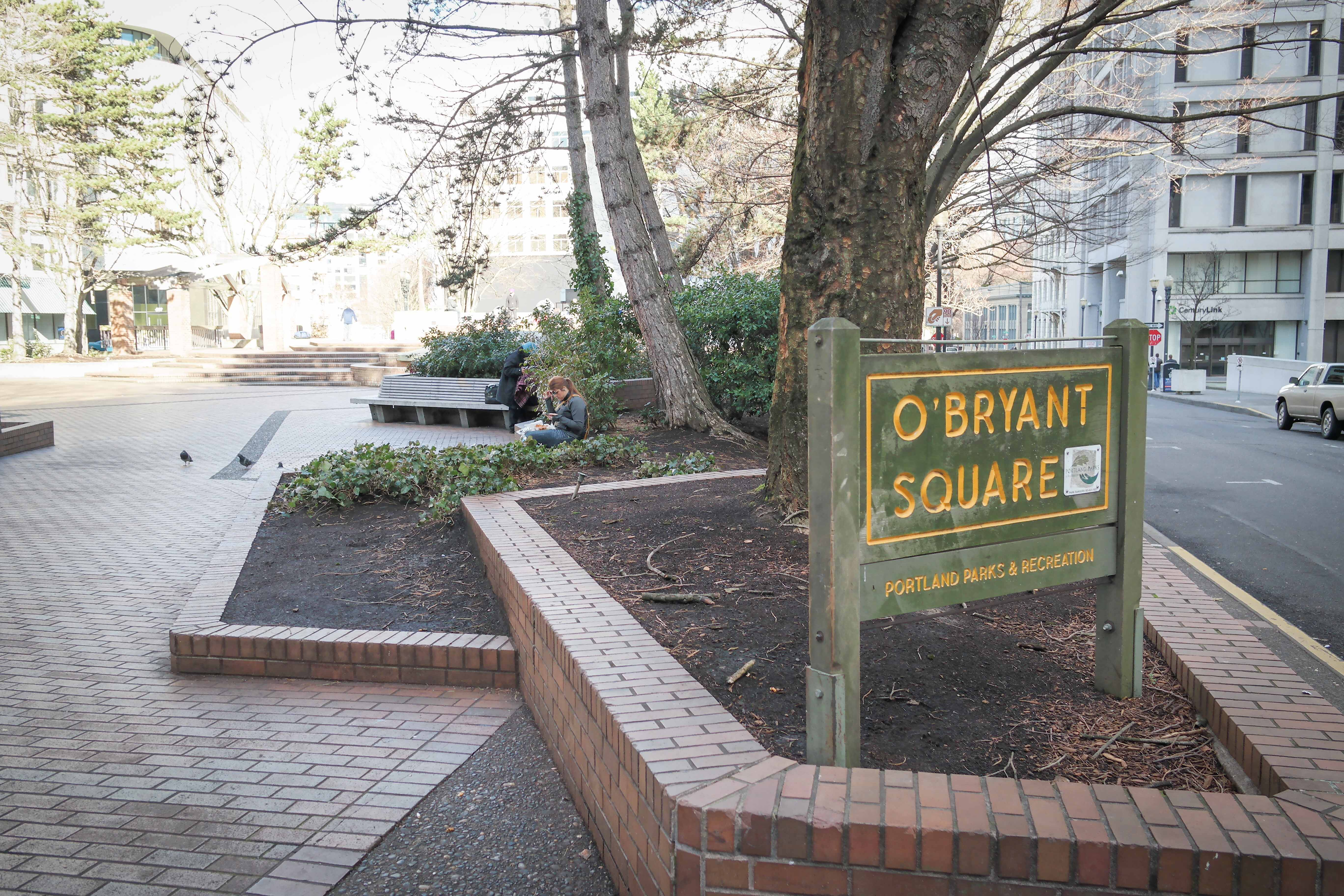
O'Bryant Square, which was demolished in 2023 as part of a redevelopment project.

== Later years ==
After his time in Washington, O'Bryant moved to Merced County, California, where he died in 1883.

== Personal life ==
O'Bryant married Matilda Doddridge Walter on July 15, 1852. They had 7 children together.

He was a Methodist.

== Legacy ==
O'Bryant Square in Portland was named after O'Bryant. In 2023, as part of a redevelopment, the park was demolished and will be re-built as Darcelle XV Plaza.

== See also ==
- List of mayors of Portland, Oregon

== Footnotes ==
| Preceded by Office created | Mayor of Portland, Oregon; 1851–1852 | Succeeded by A. C. Bonnell |
