= Shirtzenpantz =

- Exterior of a shop in downtown Portland, 2026
- Type: Vintage clothing store
- Founded: March 2025
- Founder: Owen Gail; Ethan Gail
- Headquarters: Portland, Oregon, U.S.
- Number of locations: 3
- Products: Punk rock clothing and accessories
- Website: shirtzenpantz.com

Shirtzenpantz is a vintage and second-hand clothing store chain based in Portland, Oregon, United States. The first store was opened by twin brothers Owen and Ethan Gail in 2025.

== History ==
Shirtzenpantz was first opened as a single store in March 2025, by twin brothers Owen and Ethan Gail, in the Hillsdale district. Both brothers previously had resold clothing found at Goodwill stores on Depop and Poshmark. The store quickly started garnering attention through online marketing campaigns on Instagram and TikTok, including Owen posting a video series kicking a rock named "Christosphere" daily until it became spherical.

Shirtzenpantz opened their second location in August 2025 in St. Johns, and their third location in March 2026, at the former Under U 4 Men location in downtown Portland.

Among the chain's marketing stunts includes creating unusually large clothing pieces; in October 29, Shirtzenpantz collaborated with Pendleton to create what they dub the "World's Largest Flannel Shirt".

Interior of the downtown Portland shop, 2026

Skweezy Jibbs in the downtown Portland shop's window display as part of a publicity stunt

== See also ==
- List of companies based in Oregon
