= Loveless Building =

Historical Building

- U.S. National Register of Historic Places
- U.S. Historic district
- Seattle Landmark
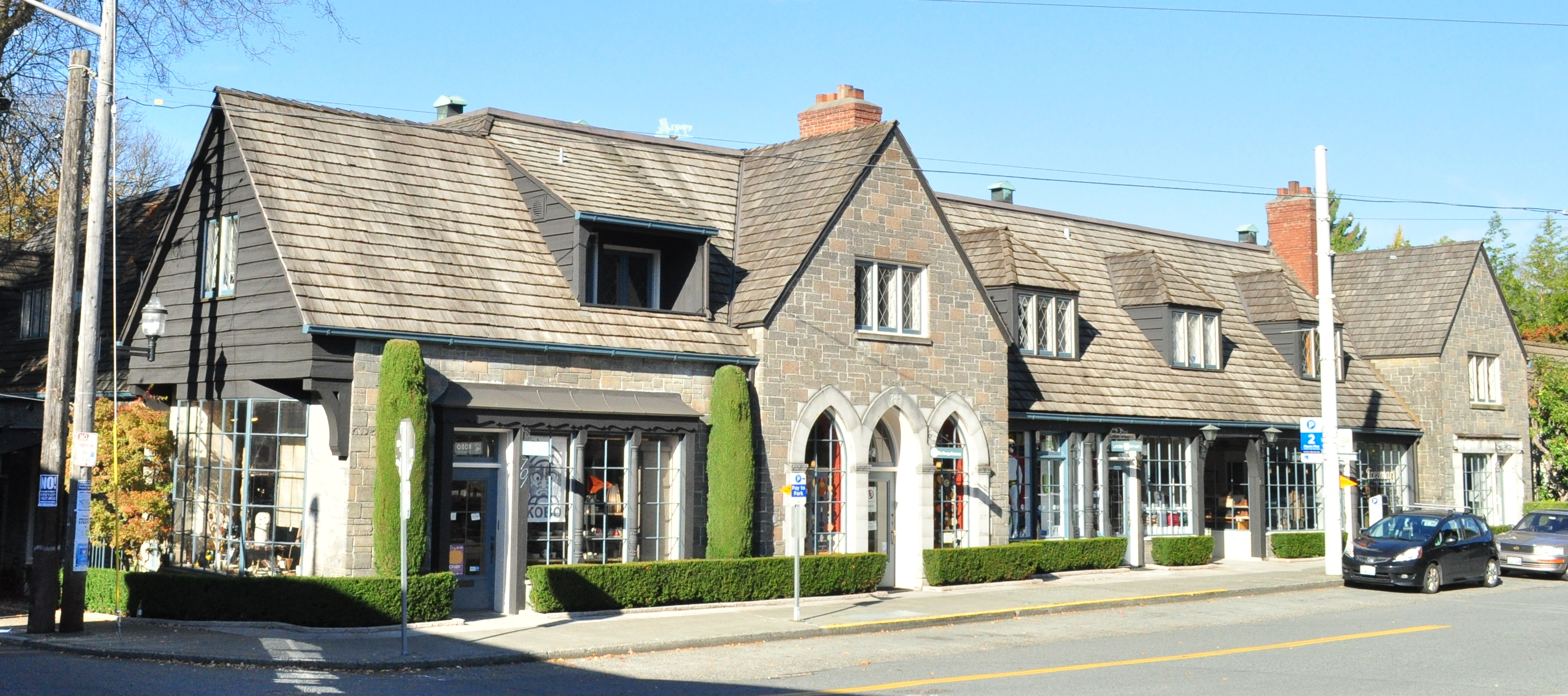
- The Loveless Building in 2017

- Location within Washington (state)
- Location: 711 Broadway E. Seattle, Washington
- Coordinates: 47°37′31.33″N 122°19′17.61″W
- Built: 1924-26, 1930-33
- Architect: Arthor Loveless
- Architectural style: Tudor Revival
- NRHP reference No.: 82004237
- SEATL No.: 109388

Significant dates
- Added to NRHP: May 13, 1982
- Designated SEATL: October 2, 1980

The Loveless Building (formerly the Office of Arthur L. Loveless, then the Studio Building) is a historic mixed-use residential and commercial building on the intersection of Broadway East and East Roy Street in Capitol Hill, Seattle, Washington, United States. Before being converted into the Loveless Building it was the home and Office of Arthur L. Loveless, who designed both the original building and the expansion.

The original office building was moved from the center of the lot to the northwest corner and cemented to the new concrete foundation. The original office is connected to, but remains self-contained from, the rest of the building with its own set of stairs separate from the other stairways such as the turret housing an octagonal stairway. The building is arranged around an interior courtyard designed by Otto Holmdahl, who prepared a preliminary plan for the entire Arboretum, was the principal architect for the Seattle World's Fair and, made rock gardens for Volunteer Park and Woodland Park.

The building is cited in the Harvard-Belmont Landmark District application to the National Register of Historic Places (NRHP) as a Primary Contributing Structure and features an official plaque noting it as being on the NRHP.

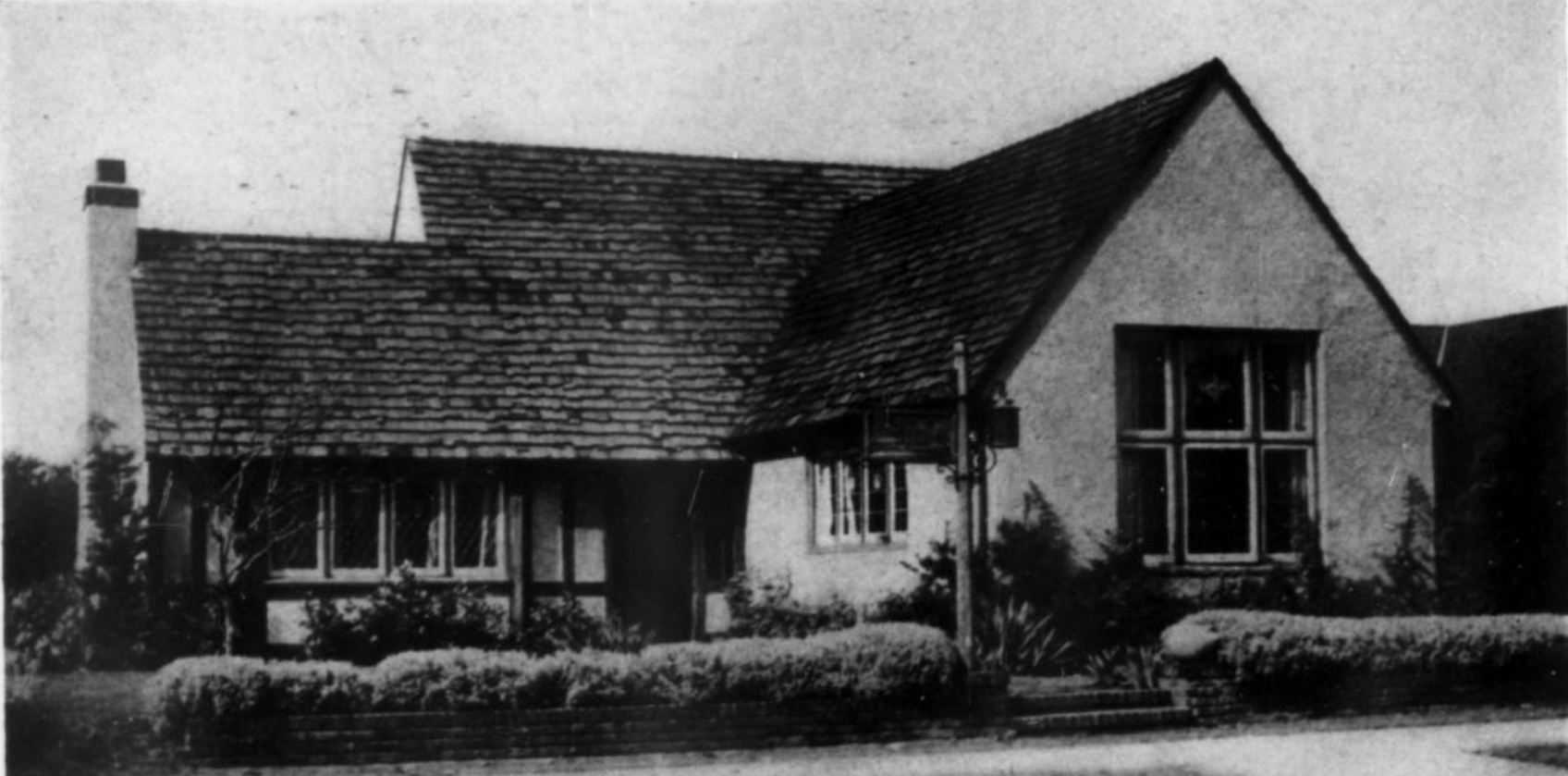
A photo of the Office of Arthur L. Loveless in 1928

The building also features a mural by artist Vladimir Pavlovich Shkurkin that depicts The Tale of Tsar Saltan in the commercial space in the southwest corner of the lot.

== Notable residents and tenants ==
- Photographer Ella McBride
- Photographer Myra Albert Wiggins
- Landscape Architect Otto Holmdahl
- Under U 4 Men

== Awards ==
The Loveless Building is considered his best-known work.

In 1928, before the expansion of the building, it won the American Institute of Architects (AIA) Honor Award for mercantile buildings.

In 1961, it won the AIA Citation Award.
