= Arthur Loveless =

American architect (1873–1971)

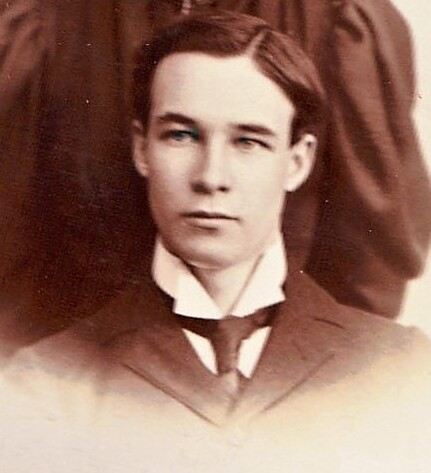
- Loveless c. 1895
- Born: Arthur Lamont Loveless; September 22, 1873; Big Rapids, Michigan, U.S.
- Died: January 5, 1971 (aged 97); Seattle, Washington, U.S.
- Education: Columbia University
- Occupation: Architect
- Years active: 1906–c. 1942

Arthur Lamont Loveless (September 22, 1873 – January 5, 1971) was an American architect who was active in the Seattle area. Born in Michigan, he worked as a bookkeeper and banker in Manistee before studying architecture at Columbia University from around 1902 to 1906. Forced to drop out due to financial concerns, however, he was employed by his professor's firm Delano & Aldrich before moving to Seattle in 1907. After brief partnerships with Clayton Wilson and Daniel R. Huntington, Loveless began independent practice around 1915. He designed a large number of residences in Seattle from the late 1900s to 1940s, including a 1909 mansion for impresario Alexander Pantages, an award-winning English country house-style residence in 1925–1926, and a studio and apartment complex in 1930–1933. He partnered with his associate Lester Fey in 1935, and was joined by Daniel E. Lamont in 1940. The partnership dissolved in 1942 and Loveless then retired. He was known for his revival architecture residences, especially making use of the Tudor Revival style.

== Biography ==
Arthur Lamont Loveless was born around Big Rapids, Michigan on September 22, 1873. (Note: One birth record lists his place of birth as "Mecosta, Michigan", although it is unclear if this refers to Mecosta County, Michigan (containing the town of Big Rapids), or to the town of Mecosta, Michigan itself. Biographer Andrew Veith names his place of birth as Big Rapids.) Along with his sister Georgia, he was one of two children of Loren T. Loveless (a barber and traveling salesman) and Carrie E. Thomas. He graduated from Big Rapids High School in 1891 and moved to Manistee, Michigan, where he found employment as a bookkeeper for the Manistee Manufacturing Company. Around 1895, he began work at the Manistee National Bank, and worked variously as a bank messenger, bill collector, and clerk over the following years.

=== Architectural career ===
Loveless grew dissatisfied with banking. Around 1893, he took a correspondence course in architecture with the University of Chicago, and around 1902 he moved to New York City to study architecture at Columbia University. He was forced to drop out of the school around 1906 due to financial difficulties, but was able to secure a position at his professor William Adams Delano's New York-based firm, Delano & Aldrich. In 1907, he left New York and moved to Seattle.

In 1909, Loveless he partnered with Clayton D. Wilson, previously known for designing the 400 Yesler Building. The Wilson & Loveless firm designed a number of residences and smaller commercial projects in Seattle, most notably a three-story mansion for impresario Alexander Pantages in 1909. Loveless partnered with city architect Daniel R. Huntington in 1912. Although Loveless began to pursue independent work again in 1915, the two architects continued sharing an office for a year or two afterwards. He designed a number of small projects for developer Lawrence Colman, including a Tudor Revival residence in 1922–1923.

During the 1920s, Loveless designed a number of buildings which won American Institute of Architects (AIA) honor awards, including his own residence (1923–1924) and office (1925–1926). Another AIA award winner, his 1925–1926 Darrah Corbet house, is modeled after English country houses. Typical of his work, the house faces away from the street towards a scenic view, with the main entrance at its rear. A hallway separates the living room and dining room, the latter of which connects the two wings of the house. He was the president of the AIA's Washington chapter from 1916 to 1917, and was elected an AIA Fellow in 1941.

Loveless completed various commercial and tenant improvement, such as alterations to the ground floor of the Colman Building. In 1930, Lester Fey became his associate, and the two designed the Playhouse Theatre. From 1930 to 1933, Loveless designed the Loveless Building, moving his original studio to accommodate for a courtyard with a much larger building incorporating shops and offices on the ground floor alongside second-story apartments. In 1935 or 1936, Fey became a partner to the firm. They were joined by Daniel E. Lamont in 1940, forming the firm Loveless, Fey & Lamont. This partnership dissolved in 1942 with the United States' entry into World War II, with the firm continuing under the name Lamont & Fey. Loveless retired soon after the partnership's dissolution, residing in his Loveless Building.

=== Personal life ===
Loveless never married. He was an avid traveler, visiting Mexico, Hawaii, Japan, Burma, China, and Spain during the 1930s and 1940s. He became an amateur photographer and a collector of Asian art and artifacts, especially of textiles and Chinese snuff bottles. After his death in Seattle on January 5, 1971, many of his collection was donated to the Seattle Art Museum.

== Works ==
Works by Arthur Loveless
Name	Location	Date	Ref.
Alexander Pantages House	1117 36th Avenue E, Seattle	1909	
Kennedy House	1620 47th Avenue E, Seattle	1909	
W. T. Campbell Building	4557-4559 California Avenue SW, Seattle	1911	
Polson Park and Museum House	1611 Riverside Avenue, Hoquiam	1923	
Porter House	2624 Mount Adams Place S, Seattle	1923	
Colman House	9343 Fauntleroy Way SW, Seattle	1923–1924	
Leber House	1634 22nd Avenue N, Seattle	1924	
Alpha Theta Delta House	4541 19th Avenue NE	1924	
Corbet House	300 Maiden Lane E, Seattle	1925	
Bowles House	2520 Shoreland Drive S, Seattle	1925	
House	7126 55th Avenue S, Seattle	c. 1925	
House	7140 55th Avenue S, Seattle	c. 1925	
House	2340 Delmar Dr E, Seattle	1928	
Bergues House	3048 E Laurelhurst Drive, Seattle	1925	
Grimshaw House	3038 E Laurelhurst Drive, Seattle	1925	
Thorgrimson House	7140 55th Avenue E, Seattle	1925	
House	3020 Magnolia Boulevard W, Seattle	1926	
Smith House	Willard Avenue & W Comstock Street, Seattle	1926	
Haight House	822 39th Avenue E, Seattle	1927	
Pierce House	5747 NE Ambleside Road, Seattle	1927–1928	
Lear House	3054 E Laurelhurst Drive, Seattle	1928	
Zeta Tau Alpha Sorority House	4731 18th Avenue, Seattle	1929	
Loveless Building (formerly the Studio Building)	711 Broadway E, Seattle	1930	
Field House	6007 NE Windermere Road, Seattle	1930	
Colman Building (alteration)	811 First Avenue, Seattle	1930	
North Broadway Shopping Center	711 Broadway E, Seattle	1931	
Playhouse Theatre	4045 University Way NE, Seattle	1931	
Delta Gamma Sorority House	2012 NE 45th Street	1937	
Agen House	Seattle	1941	

== Notes ==
=== Works cited ===
- Michelson, Alan. "Arthur Lamont Loveless". Pacific Coast Architecture Database (PCAD).
- Houser, Michael C. "Fey, Lester P." Docomomo.
- Veith, Thomas (2014). "Arthur L. Loveless". In Ochsner, Jeffery Karl (ed.). Shaping Seattle Architecture: A Historical Guide to the Architects (2nd ed.). University of Washington Press. pp. 180–185. ISBN 9780295806891.
- Woodbridge, Sally B.; Montgomery, Roger (1980). A Guide to Architecture in Washington State: An Environmental Perspective. University of Washington Press. ISBN 9780295705958.
