= Capitol Hill, Seattle =

Capitol Hill
- Neighborhood
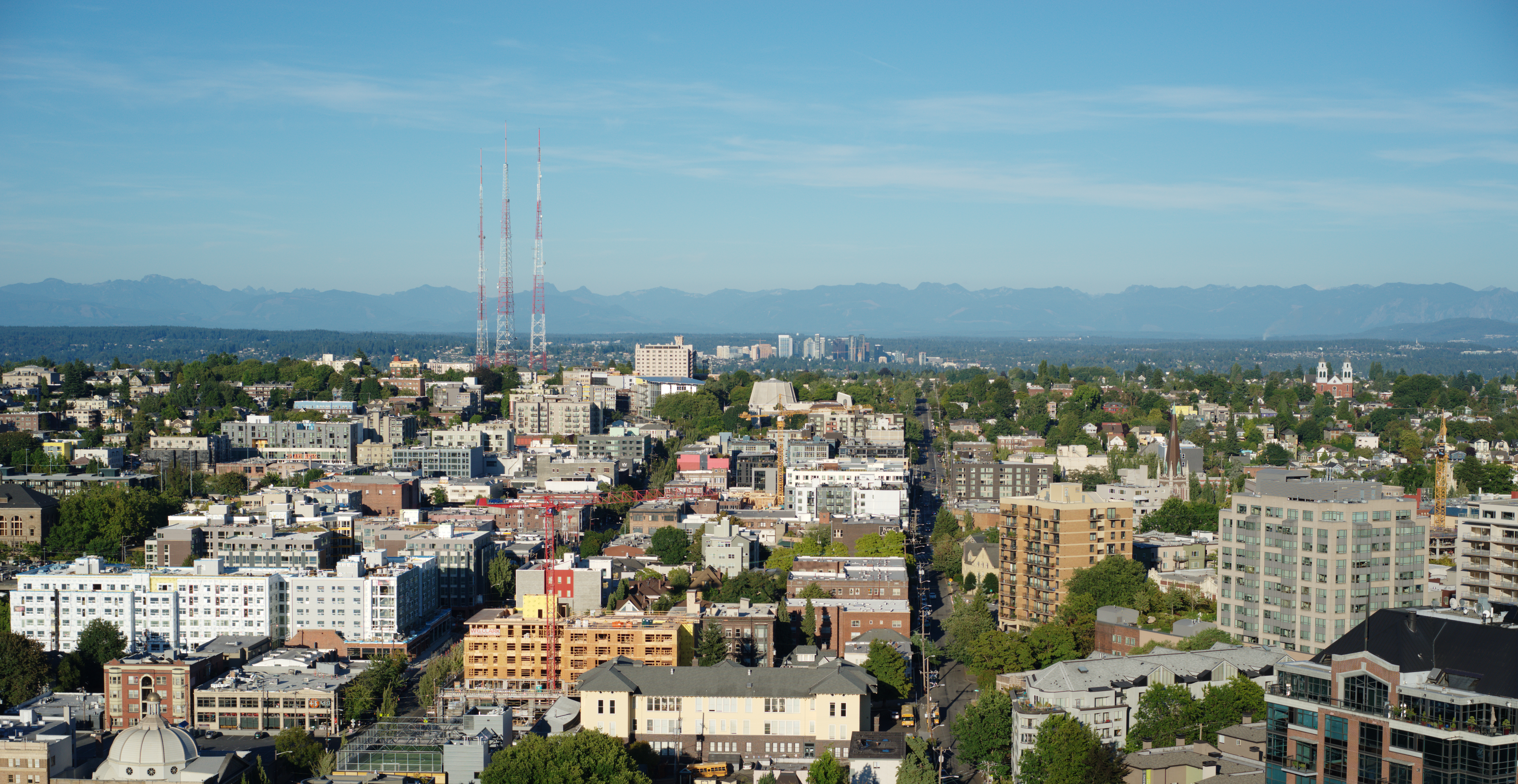
- Capitol Hill as seen from 9th Avenue and Pine Street, looking east

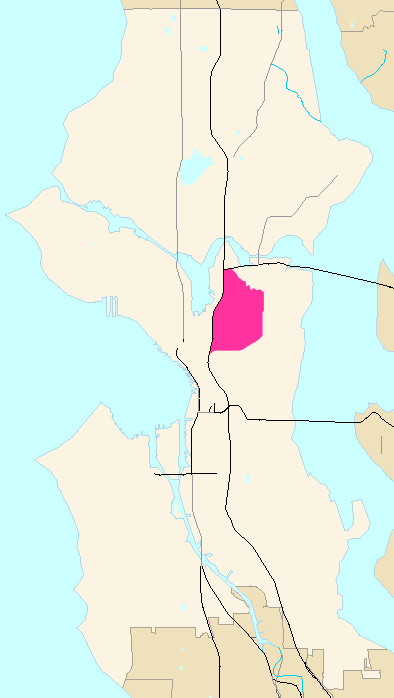
- Capitol Hill's location in Seattle
- Coordinates: 47°37′27″N 122°19′15″W
- Country: United States
- State: Washington
- City: Seattle
- City Council: District 3
- Neighborhood Council: East District
- Police District: East Precinct, E1-3
- Established: February 4, 1886 (annexation by Seattle)
- Founder: James A. Moore

Area
  - Total: 1.64 sq mi (4.2 km^{2})

Population
  - Total: 32,144
  - Density: 19,600/sq mi (7,570/km^{2})
- ZIP code: 98102, 98112, 98122
- Website: visitseattle.org/capitol-hill

Capitol Hill is a densely populated residential district and a neighborhood in Seattle, Washington, United States. It is immediately east of Downtown Seattle and north of First Hill. The neighborhood is one of the city's most popular nightlife and entertainment districts and is home to a historic gay village and vibrant music community.

== History ==
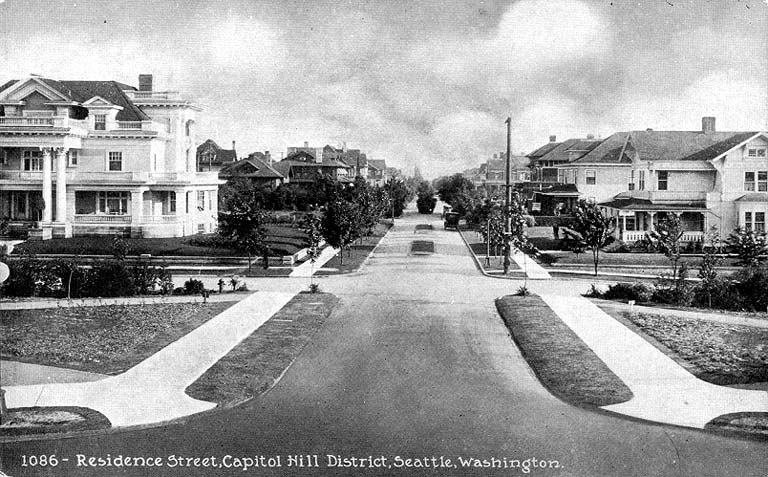
Capitol Hill c. 1917

In the early 1900s Capitol Hill was known as 'Broadway Hill' after the neighborhood's main thoroughfare. The origin of its current name is disputed. James A. Moore, the real estate developer who platted much of the area, reportedly gave it the name in the hope that the Washington State Capitol would move to Seattle from Olympia. Another story claims that Moore named it after the Capitol Hill neighborhood of Denver, Colorado, his wife's hometown. According to author Jacqueline Williams, both stories are likely true. The neighborhood was frequently referred to as Catholic Hill up until the 1980s due to its large Catholic population.

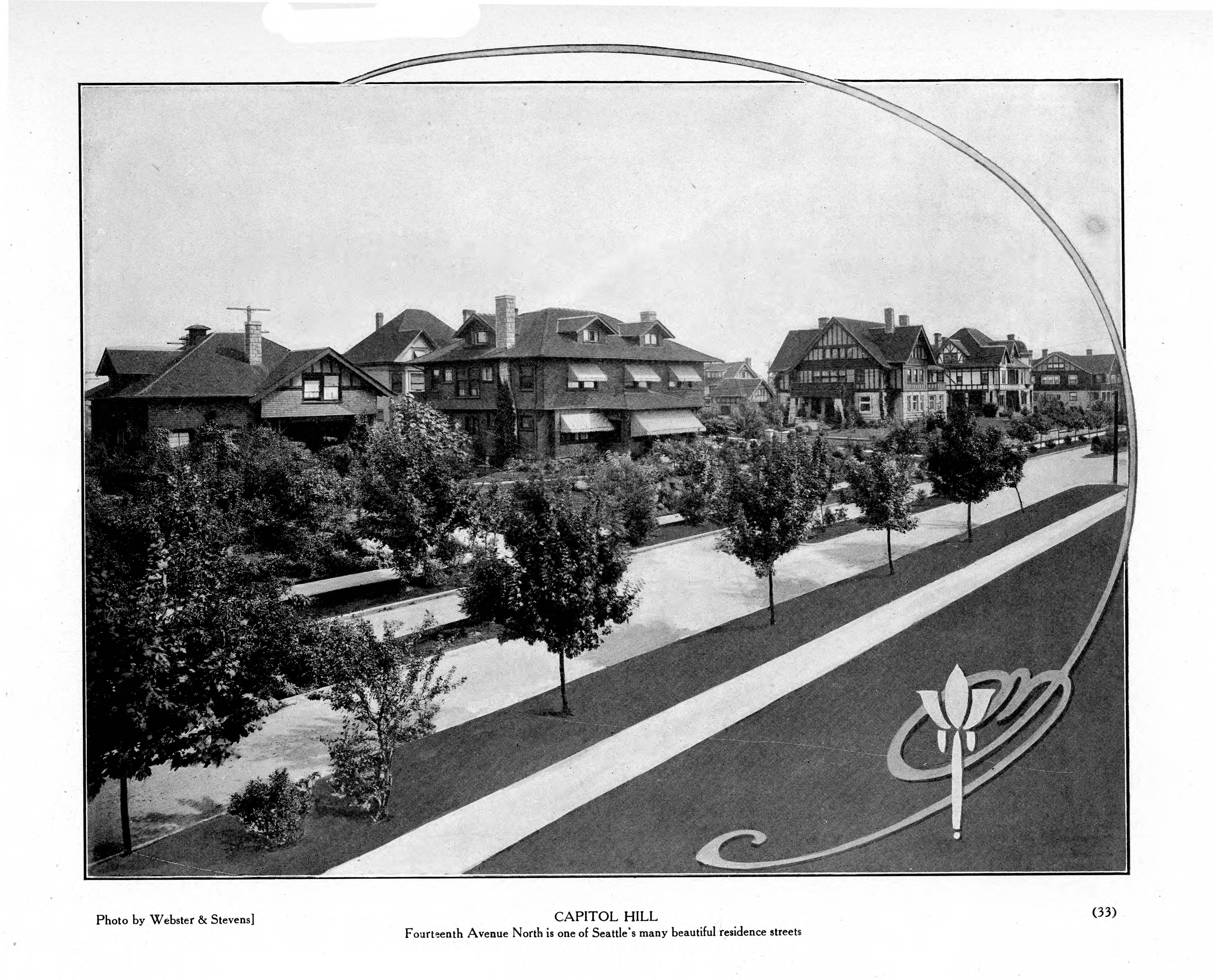
View of Fourteenth Avenue, an area known as Millionaire's Row (published 1909 in an Alaska-Yukon-Pacific Exposition pamphlet

Capitol Hill is home to some of Seattle's wealthiest neighborhoods, including "Millionaire's Row" along 14th Avenue E. south of Volunteer Park (family residences on tree-lined streets) and the Harvard-Belmont Landmark District. The neighborhood is home to many distinguished apartment houses, including several by Fred Anhalt, as well as a few surviving Classical Revival complexes such as the Blackstone Apartments. The neighborhood's architecture did not fare so well in the post-World War II period; architect Victor Steinbrueck wrote in 1962 of the "tremendous growth of less-than-luxury apartments" that at first "appear to be consistent with the clean, direct approach associated with contemporary architecture" but whose "open outdoor corridors" totally defeat their "large 'view' windows" by giving occupants no privacy if they leave their blinds open to enjoy the view. He added, "most tenants close their blinds and look for another apartment when their lease runs out."

In the early 1970s, Seattle grouped neighborhoods into planning zones, combining Renton Hill and Capitol Hill together under the name Capitol Hill. The Capitol Hill neighborhood was much wealthier, more oriented towards single-family homes, and less integrated with the city than Renton Hill.

During the 1970s, the social core of Seattle's LGBTQ community briefly moved from Pioneer Square to Renton Hill. It soon shifted to Capitol Hill, which has been Seattle's gayborhood ever since.

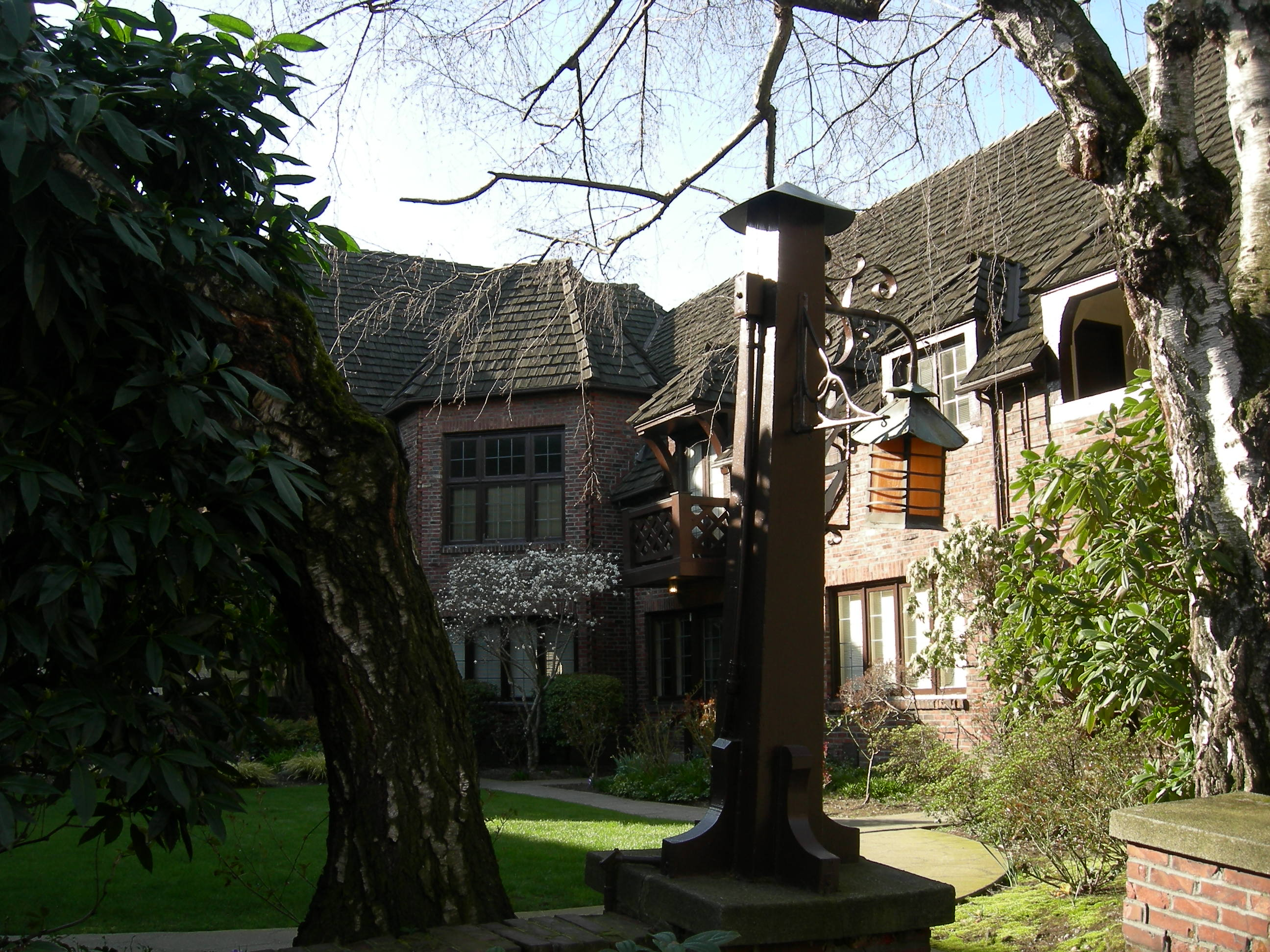
A Fred Anhalt apartment building on Harvard Avenue E.

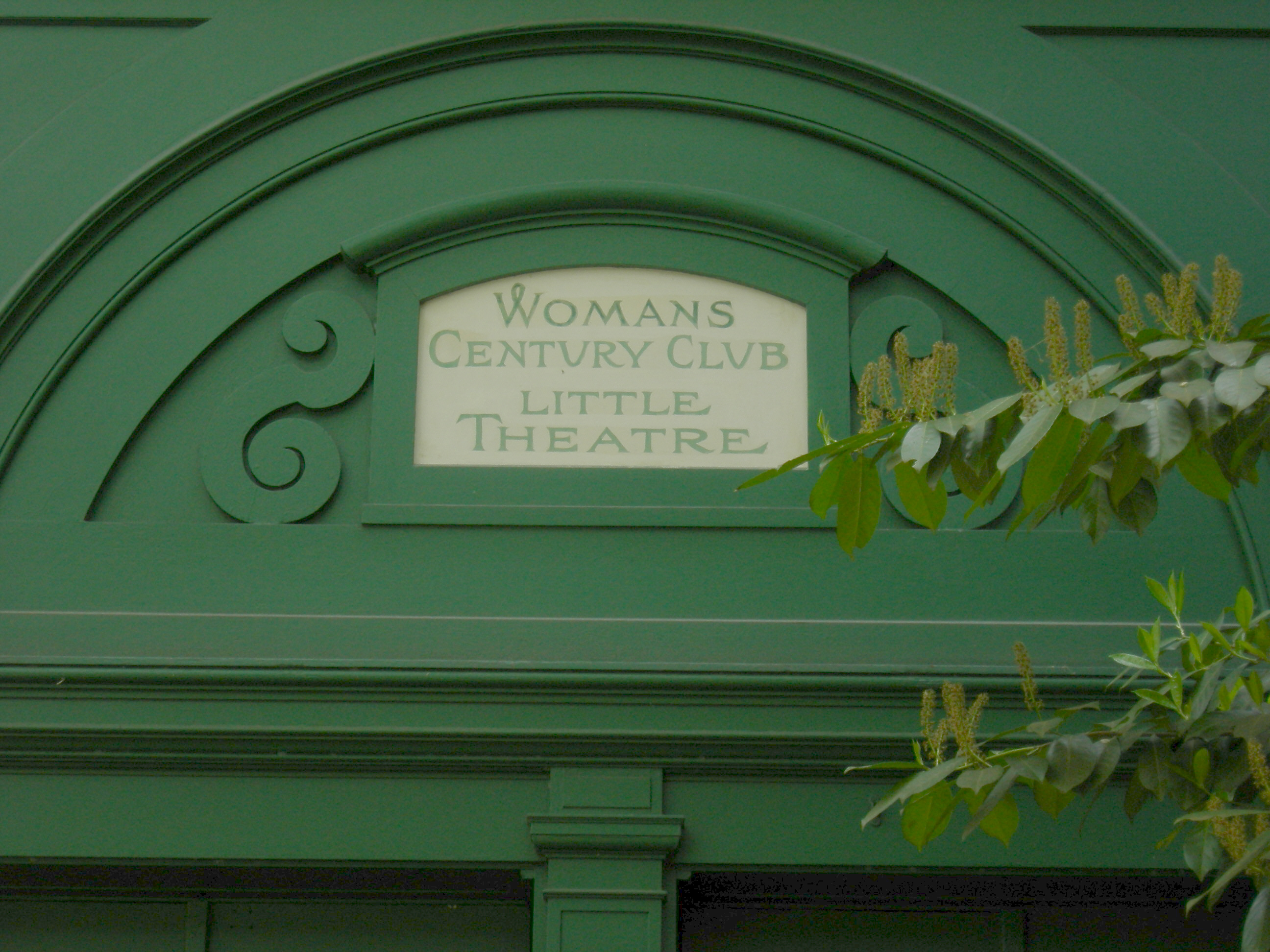
A sign over the rear door of the Harvard Exit Theatre recognizing the Woman's Century Club, founded in 1891. The club constructed the building in 1925 to serve as its clubhouse; it is now the Mexican consulate

During the George Floyd protests of 2020, Cal Anderson Park and surrounding blocks along Pike and Pine Streets near the SPD East Precinct were occupied by protesters and declared the Capitol Hill Autonomous Zone (CHAZ).

=== Auto Row ===
Portions of Capitol Hill were home to an "auto row" that comprised 31 of the city's 41 car dealerships by 1911. Automobile businesses, which also included service garages and parts suppliers, congregated around Pike Street, Pine Street, and Broadway. The auto row declined after the 1920s and was gradually replaced with other retailers and businesses that left behind spaces later used by artists and the LGBTQ community. Many of the buildings were preserved as historic landmarks or integrated into new developments.

== Geography ==
Capitol Hill is situated on a steep hill just east of the city's downtown central business district. It is bounded by Interstate 5 (I-5) to the west (beyond which are Downtown, Cascade, and Eastlake); to the north by State Route 520 and Interlaken Park (beyond which are Portage Bay and Montlake); to the south by E. Pike and E. Madison Streets (beyond which are First Hill and the Central District); and to the east by 23rd and 24th Avenues E. (beyond which is Madison Valley).

Capitol Hill's main thoroughfare is Broadway, the commercial heart of the district. Other major streets in the area are 10th, 12th, 15th, and 19th Avenues, all running north–south, and E. Pine, E. Pike, E. John, E. Thomas, and E. Aloha Streets and E. Olive Way, running east–west. Of these streets, large portions of E. Pike Street, E. Pine Street, Broadway, 15th Avenue, and E. Olive Way are lined almost continuously with street-level retail. The Pike-Pine corridor (the area between Pike and Pine streets) from Boren Avenue through 15th Street is another main thoroughfare in Capitol Hill, full of coffee shops, bars, restaurants, and other food and music businesses. The neighborhood is largely characterized by mid-rise buildings occupied by an eclectic mix of businesses.

The highest point on Capitol Hill, at 444 feet (135 m) above sea level, is in Volunteer Park, adjacent to the water tower. Capitol Hill has several of Seattle's steepest street grades, including the steepest paved street at 21% on E. Roy Street between 25th and 26th Avenues E. (eastern slope).

Panorama of Capitol Hill during blue hour, as seen from the 40th floor of 1525 9th Ave.

== Transportation ==
The Link light rail system's Capitol Hill station is served by the 1 Line and opened in March 2016 as part of the University Link extension. The 1 Line connects the neighborhood to the University of Washington campus to the north, and Downtown Seattle to the south. The station is located along Broadway south of John Street and Olive Way.

The First Hill Streetcar line, which opened in January 2016, terminates in the neighborhood on Broadway at Denny Way, just south of the Link light rail station. Capitol Hill was previously served by city-run streetcars until 1940.

Bus transit service to and within Capitol Hill is provided by King County Metro, including routes 10, 12, 43 and 49 of the Seattle trolleybus system. Capitol Hill is also served by the Rapid Ride G bus line along Madison Street, connecting from downtown Seattle, through First Hill, then Capitol Hill, and beyond to Madison Valley and Madison Park. The bus line includes 6-minute headways during peak times, and center-boarding stations between 9th and 13th avenues.

== Culture ==
=== Arts and entertainment ===
Capitol Hill has a reputation as a bastion of musical culture in Seattle and is the neighborhood most closely associated with the grunge scene from the early 1990s, although most of the best-known music venues of that era were actually located slightly outside the neighborhood. The music scene has transformed since those days and now a variety of genres (electronica, rock, punk, folk, salsa, hip hop and trance) are represented.

The neighborhood figures prominently in nightlife and entertainment, with many bars hosting live music and with numerous fringe theatres. Most of the Hill's major thoroughfares are dotted with coffeehouses, taverns and bars, and residences cover the gamut from modest motel-like studio apartment buildings to some of the city's most historic mansions, with the two types sometimes shoulder-to-shoulder.

Capitol Hill is also home to two of the city's best-known movie theaters, both of which are part of the Landmark Theatres chain. Both theaters are architectural conversions of private meeting halls: the Harvard Exit (now closed permanently) in the former home of the Woman's Century Club (converted in the early 1970s) and the Egyptian Theatre, in a former Masonic lodge (converted in the mid-1980s). There is also Seattle's only cinematheque, the Northwest Film Forum, which in addition to screening films, teaches classes on filmmaking and produces film alongside Seattle's burgeoning filmmaking community. These theaters respectively host showings for the Seattle International Film Festival (SIFF) and the Seattle Lesbian & Gay Film Festival every year. The Broadway Performance Hall, located on the campus of Seattle Central College (SCC), also hosts a variety of lectures, performances, and films. The cast of MTV's Real World Seattle: Bad Blood lived in and were filmed in Capitol Hill during 2016.

Since 1997, Capitol Hill has hosted the Capitol Hill Block Party annually in late July, an outdoor music festival that occurs on Pike Street between Broadway and 12th Ave and Union and Pine Street.

A "mystery soda machine", dispensing unusual drink flavors, was present in Capitol Hill from the late 1990s to 2018. Allison Williams of Seattle Met noted several years after the machine was removed, that the neighborhood of Capitol Hill now has a more corporate culture and may no longer be "weird enough for a persistent enigma."

Multiple hip-hop songs have been written about Capitol Hill and its nightlife. Seattle rapper Sir Mix-a-Lot, who hails from the nearby Central District, recorded his hit single "Posse on Broadway" about a night out on Capitol Hill. Macklemore, who grew up in the neighborhood near Broadway, has written multiple songs about Capitol Hill, including 2005's "Claiming the City" (a serious track addressing gentrification) and 2013's "Cowboy Boots" (an ode to the neighborhood's nightlife).

=== Coffeehouses ===
Besides the large Seattle-based chains—Starbucks, Seattle's Best Coffee (now owned by Starbucks), and Tully's Coffee—Capitol Hill has been home to some of the city's most prominent locally owned coffeehouses. David Schomer's Espresso Vivace on Broadway is credited as the birthplace of artisanal coffee culture and latte art in Seattle and the United States as a whole. The neighborhood is also considered a test market for coffeehouses by Starbucks Corporation, which placed two stealth Starbucks stores on Capitol Hill in 2009 and 2011 that were later closed by 2019.

== LGBTQ community ==
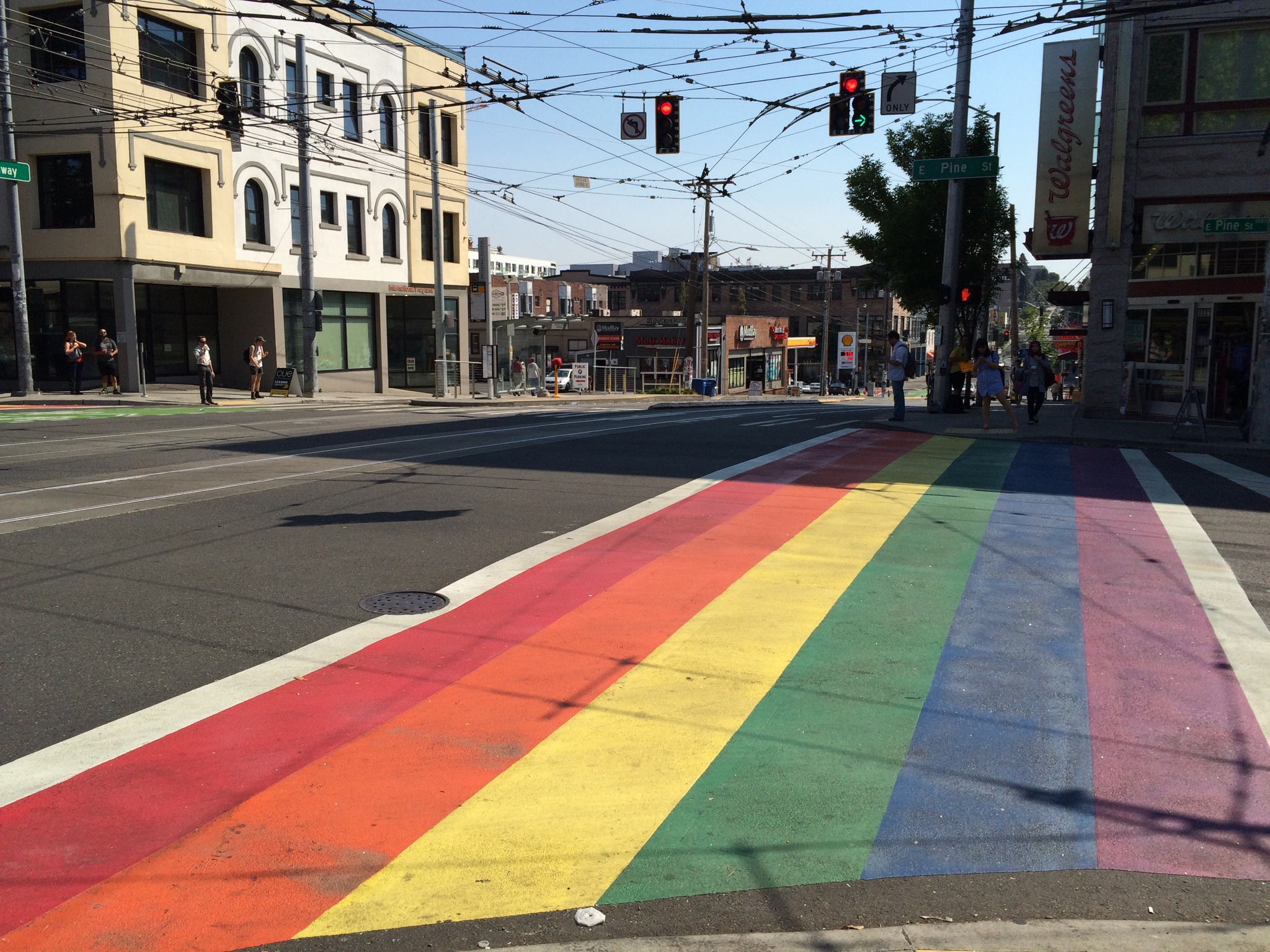
One of Capitol Hill's eleven rainbow crosswalks, pictured at Broadway and Pine Street

A burgeoning counterculture community on Capitol Hill in the mid-20th century became a magnet for LGBTQ people seeking community acceptance at a time when the city's earlier gay center in Pioneer Square was in decline. As a result, large-scale gay residential settlement of Capitol Hill began in the early 1960s, and the district continues to be home to a sizable number of LGBTQ people, making Capitol Hill Seattle's gayborhood.

The roots of the LGBTQ community on Capitol Hill can be traced to a change in the demographics and culture of the city as a whole in the 1950s and 1960s. LGBTQ Seattleites had long congregated in Pioneer Square, often interchangeably termed "Skid Road," and had built up a community in establishments such as The Double Header, The Casino, and The Garden of Allah (just north of the neighborhood). When the neighborhood, which houses many notable works of Victorian and Edwardian architecture, was targeted for urban renewal (and perhaps even prior), the Seattle Police Department engaged in extortion, allowing illegal homosexual practices and cross-dressing to continue only in bars which paid them off. The payoffs did not always guarantee security, and in 1966, citing alarm over the city's widespread image as a bastion of gay culture and tolerance, SPD planned a major house-cleaning of the gay bars in Pioneer Square. The gay community then began to migrate out of Downtown Seattle, which was accelerated by the opening of the Kingdome and redevelopment of the neighborhood for sports-friendly uses in the 1970s.

The rise of American counterculture on the west coast took place during the same period. Although the University District, home to sites such as the Ave, the University of Washington, Parrington Lawn or "Hippie Hill", the Last Exit On Brooklyn coffeehouse, and the Blue Moon Tavern, was the primary hub of 1960s counterculture in Seattle, Capitol Hill also experienced a very noticeable influx of artistic and bohemian life. Largely driven by low rent from white flight in the steadily disappearing "auto row" of Capitol Hill's Pike-Pine Corridor neighborhood, LGBTQ Seattleites began to build the foundations of a community of their own deep in the structure of this evolving neighborhood.

=== Community growth ===
After the Elite Tavern, the first gay bar on Broadway, opened in the 1950s, the LGBTQ community on the Hill began to grow parallel to its decline in Pioneer Square. By the late 1960s, Capitol Hill was primed to become the local home base of the gay liberation movement and community throughout the decade following the Stonewall riots of 1969 in New York City.

Capitol Hill was the birthplace of many notable LGBTQ organizations during the first 25 years of the gay rights movement. In July 1969, only a few days after the Stonewall riots, the Dorian Society opened Dorian House in Capitol Hill's Hilltop neighborhood, a locale which soon became an important hub of LGBTQ youth outreach. (Note: The name "Hilltop" has fallen out of common usage, but in this context refers to the area around 15th Avenue between Madison Street and Volunteer Park. The original Dorian House stood at 320 Malden Avenue East, just off 15th.) Now called Seattle Counseling Service, it was the first mental health organization in the United States specializing in affirming treatment of ostracized LGBTQ youth. In 1974, the Gay Community Center opened in the Hilltop area. In 1991, Lambert House LGBTQ youth community center, also in the Hilltop, opened its doors and became a model organization for queer youth outreach. After moving from Downtown in 1982, Seattle's official gay pride parades took place on Capitol Hill for several decades, and the annual festival continues to hold block parties on the Hill.

=== HIV/AIDS and memorials ===
The gay and bisexual male community on Capitol Hill was the epicenter of the HIV/AIDS epidemic in the region. Among the deceased in 1995 was Washington's first openly-gay legislator, Cal Anderson, who was the state legislative representative for Capitol Hill and the University District. In remembrance of Anderson's legacy, Lincoln Reservoir Park, the main Olmstedian centerpiece to the urban landscape of the Broadway, Pike-Pine, and Hilltop neighborhoods which form the core of Capitol Hill's LGBTQ community, was renamed in his honor.

During Pride week of 2015, eleven permanent rainbow crosswalks were painted in the Capitol Hill portion of the Pike-Pine corridor. In 2020, the plaza atop Capitol Hill light rail station adjacent to Cal Anderson Park became home to the AIDS Memorial Pathway, a permanent outdoor public art gallery commemorating victims of the HIV/AIDS epidemic. In 2019, the block of E Denny Way at the light rail station that connects Broadway to Cal Anderson Park was renamed E Barbara Bailey Way, after a notable small business owner and LGBTQ rights activist.

=== 21st century ===
In 1993, the oldest gay bar on Broadway, the Elite Tavern, was bombed by neo-Nazis. Capitol Hill has become the target of an increasing number of anti-LGBTQ hate crimes in the early 21st century.

The increased gentrification of the neighborhood by the end of the 20th century led to an outward migration of the LGBTQ community to other areas of the city and surrounding metropolitan area. From 2000 to 2012, the share of same-sex couple households on Capitol Hill declined by 23 percent, while it increased by 52 percent citywide. From 2010 to 2015, 89 new buildings were built on Capitol Hill and 4,600 residential units were added—primarily catering towards high-income tech industry workers.

== Landmarks and institutions ==
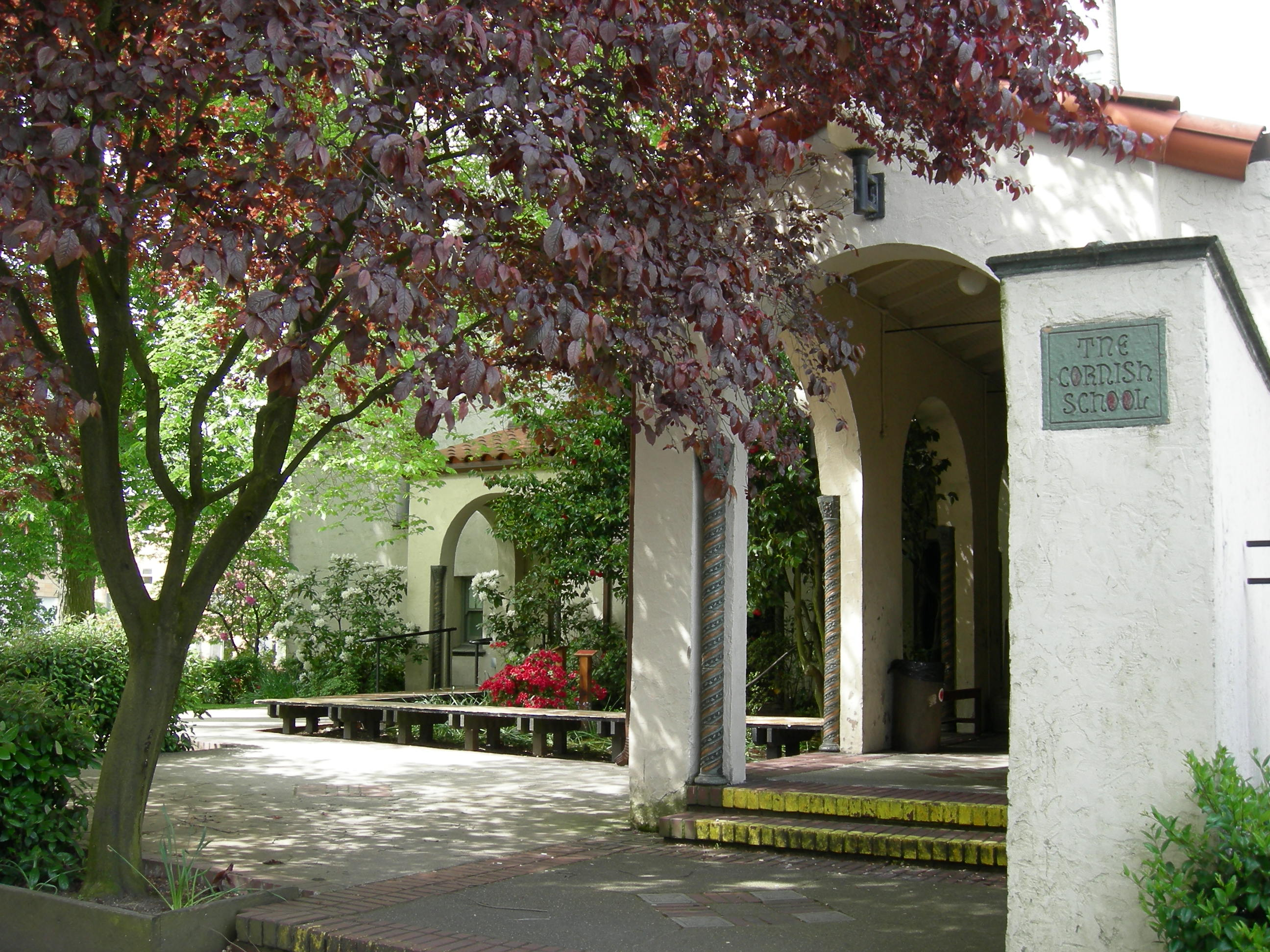
Kerry Hall is the original building of the Cornish School and was the last piece of the Cornish College of the Arts remaining on the Hill until its sale in 2024 (the rest is now in the Denny Triangle).

Registered Historic Places on Capitol Hill include the Harvard-Belmont Landmark District, in which is located the original building of the Cornish College of the Arts; Volunteer Park, in which are the Seattle Asian Art Museum and Volunteer Park Conservatory; and The Northwest School.

In addition to Volunteer Park, parks on Capitol Hill include Cal Anderson Park, Louisa Boren Park, Interlaken Park, Roanoke Park, Pendleton Miller Park, and Thomas Street Park. Lake View Cemetery, containing the graves of Bruce Lee and his son Brandon Lee, lies directly north of Volunteer Park, and the Grand Army of the Republic Cemetery is further north.

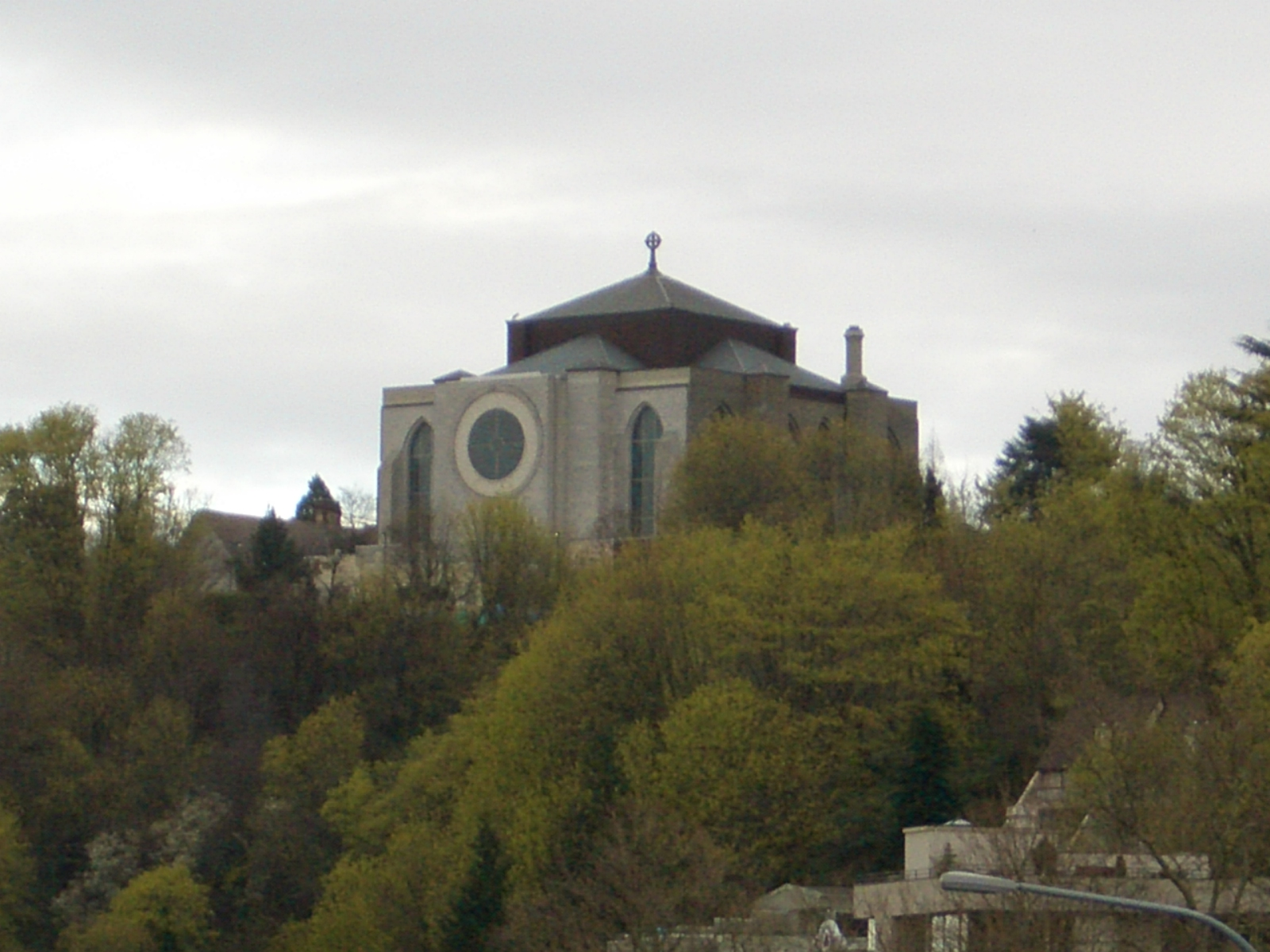
St. Mark's Episcopal Cathedral dominates the North Capitol Hill skyline.

Also on the Hill are The Northwest School, Seattle Academy of Arts and Sciences, St. Joseph School, Holy Names Academy, Seattle Hebrew Academy, Seattle Preparatory School, Seattle University, Seattle Central Community College, and St. Mark's Episcopal Cathedral. Additionally, Seattle University is located south of Madison Street, and is considered to be either in Capitol Hill or First Hill.

The oldest African-American church in Seattle is located on 14th Avenue, between E Pike and E Pine streets. The First African Methodist Episcopal Church was originally incorporated in 1891 as the Jones Street Church (when 14th Avenue was called Jones Street). The church was constructed in 1912, replacing the large house where congregations previously met, on the same site. The church structure was designated as a Seattle landmark in 1984.

The First Methodist Protestant Church of Seattle, listed on the National Register of Historic Places, was remodeled and is now occupied by a design and marketing firm.

There is one Jewish synagogue near Capitol Hill. Temple De Hirsch Sinai, whose Alhadeff Sanctuary was designed by B. Marcus Priteca, among others, is just south of Madison Street, placing it technically in the Central District.

In 2021, St Patrick's church on East Edgar Street was named as one of three Catholic churches facing closure in a reorganization plan by the Archdiocese of Seattle.
