= Fred Anhalt =

American architect

- Born: Frederick William Anhalt; March 6, 1896; Canby, Minnesota
- Died: July 17, 1996 (aged 100); Seattle, Washington
- Occupation: Architect
- Buildings: 1005 East Roy Street ("Ten-oh-Five"); 1014 East Roy Street; 1600 East John Street ("Anhalt Arms")

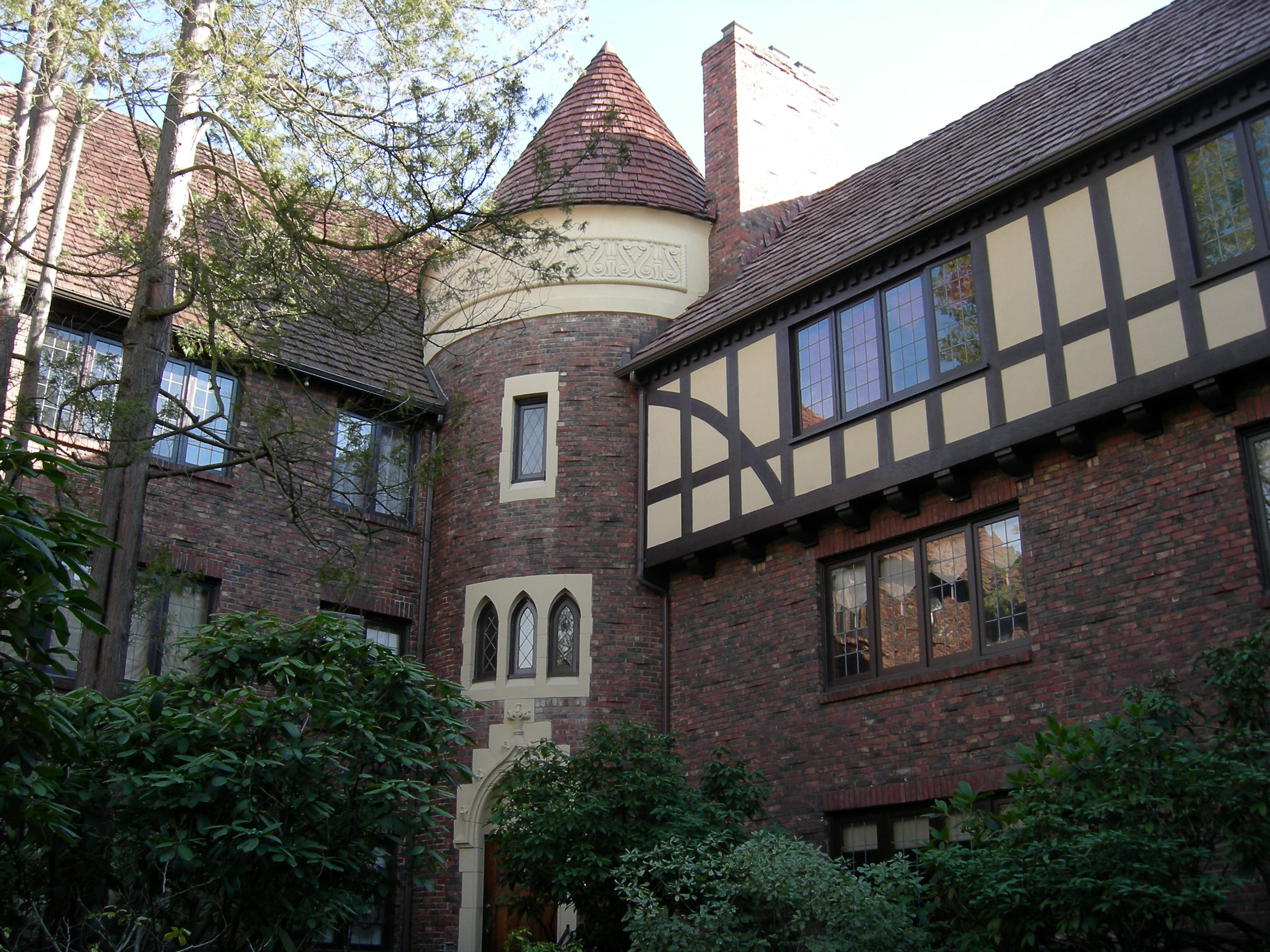
1005 E. Roy ("Ten-O-Five"), one of several Anhalt buildings with Seattle city landmark status

Frederick William Anhalt (March 6, 1896 – July 17, 1996) was a builder and contractor who constructed many distinguished rental apartment buildings in Seattle, Washington in the 1920s and early 1930s. In 1993, the Seattle Chapter of the American Institute of Architects (AIA) awarded Anhalt an honorary membership in recognition of excellence in residential design. In 2001, The Seattle Times listed Anhalt as one of the 150 most influential people in Seattle History. His buildings have been referred to as "Castles in Seattle."

Anhalt designed and constructed more than 40 buildings in Seattle between 1925 and 1942. Anhalt's designs reflect Norman, Tudor, and Spanish Mission architectural influences, and incorporate both architectural flourishes and modern construction techniques that were uncommon in mainstream residential architectural projects of the pre-war period. Three of Anhalt's buildings are listed as Seattle Historic Landmarks. Three other Anhalt buildings are part of the Harvard-Belmont Historic District in Seattle's Capitol Hill neighborhood.

== Early career ==
Fred Anhalt moved to Seattle from the midwest in the early 1920s. After working as a grocer and appliance salesman, Anhalt and partner Jerome B. Hardcastle, a former butcher, founded the Western Building & Leasing Company in 1925 in order to build small commercial buildings, primarily markets, in Seattle's outlying neighborhoods such as Ballard, Greenwood, Beacon Hill, West Seattle, and North Queen Anne Hill.

Anhalt's company soon branched out from commercial buildings and began to design and build bungalow-style houses and Bungalow court apartment buildings. Although Western Building & Leasing initially relied primarily on external architects and contractors to construct their buildings, by 1927 Anhalt began to take a more direct role, despite having no formal training as an architect. Anhalt would often work late in his home office, sketching designs for a new project at his drafting table. The next morning, Anhalt would hand the sketches off to Seattle architect Mark Borchert, to his frequent collaborator, architect William Whitely, or to his own draftsmen Edwin Dofson and Bjarne Moe, for further refinement. In 1928, Anhalt bought out Hardcastle and founded Anhalt and Borchert, Designers and Builders, with Borchert.

== Anhalt apartments ==
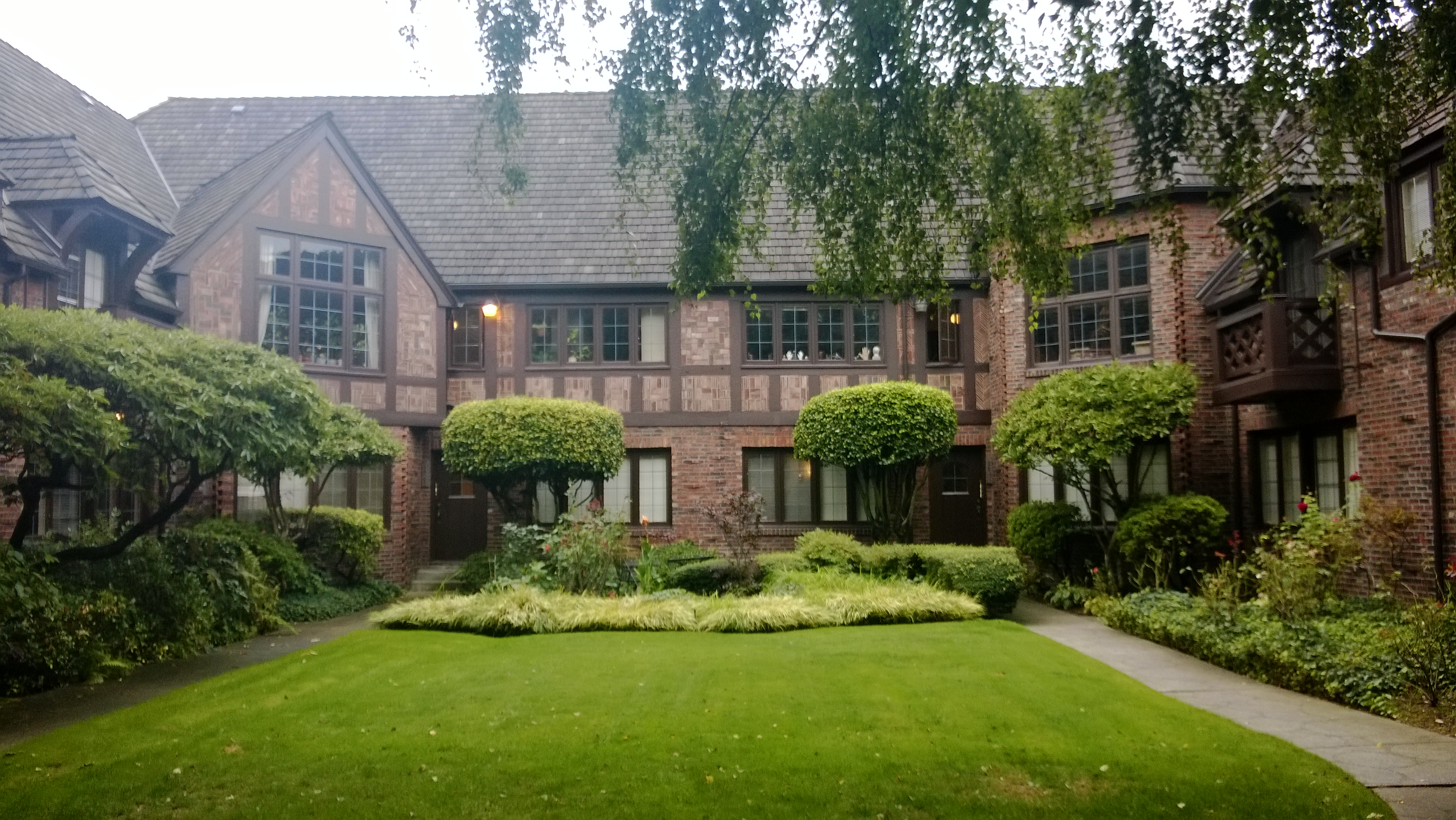
An Anhalt apartment courtyard.

A growing interest in classic European architectural styles led Anhalt to begin sketching concepts for larger and more sophisticated apartment building designs, incorporating elements drawn from architectural pattern books such as Samuel Skidmore's Tudor Homes of England. Many of these new, multi-story buildings incorporated Tudor and Norman elements, such as turrets, stained-glass windows, and spiral staircases. Others drew on the Spanish Mission style in their use of clay roof tiles and faux-adobe stucco with ceramic inlays.

In contrast with Anhalt's earlier bungalows, which were similar in style to other residential buildings of the period, the multi-story apartment buildings that Anhalt built during the late 1920s and early 1930s possess many custom touches, luxury amenities, and distinctive architectural features. These buildings were designed to provide members of the growing middle class with compelling alternatives to single family homes at a time when many central Seattle neighborhoods were becoming increasingly urbanized.

Most Anhalt apartments, especially those he built in Seattle's Capitol Hill and Queen Anne neighborhoods such as Anhalt Arms (formerly Berkeley Court), feature landscaped interior courtyards. These courtyards, which are shaded and recessed from the street, provide a semi-private, outdoor common space for residents. Unlike many apartments built during the pre-war era, many Anhalt Apartments also possess both a front and a back door. The front door faced inwards, either onto a small alcove or landing shared with one to three other apartments, or directly onto the interior courtyard. These design decisions were intended to foster both a sense of privacy for individual tenants, and a sense of community within the building as a whole.

Despite broad stylistic similarities, Anhalt apartments have been recognized for the degree to which each building is customized to its particular building site. The basic plan—individual living spaces oriented around a common, open courtyard—made it easier to make effective use of the natural light and existing vegetation on the building site. This floor plan also provided flexibility for minimizing street noise and maximizing privacy even in neighborhoods with high urban density.

The interiors of Anhalt apartments feature amenities and design details that were uncommon in apartments of the time. Many Anhalt apartments featured built-in refrigerators, electric dish washers, wood-burning fireplaces, high ceilings, hand-carved woodwork, and double floors for soundproofing. Although individual apartments were not exceptionally large, many featured individualized floor plans and amenities more commonly found in single-family homes: upper and lower levels connected by curved interior staircases, private balconies, glazed tile work, and stained-glass window panes. The 25-unit Ten-O-Five apartment building, completed in 1930, was the first apartment building in Seattle to feature an underground parking garage.

Lawrence Kreisman, in his booklet, Apartments by Anhalt, says:

"What made Anhalt's buildings succeed is not their particular style or size, or complexity. It is the style of living encouraged therein -- the creation, through design, of an enclosed community that, while it relates to the street and neighborhood, also provides a common green, an outdoor living room that is the sole province of the tenants."

Anhalt Apartments have been recognized both for their high build quality and for the speed with which they were constructed. Anhalt's company often completed construction of a building within fewer than three months, and usually constructed several buildings simultaneously. Anhalt achieved this balance through vertical integration and by taking advantages of efficiencies of scale—by centralizing design and construction within the same firm, and placing large orders with local suppliers of brick, tile and other building materials.

== Late career and legacy ==
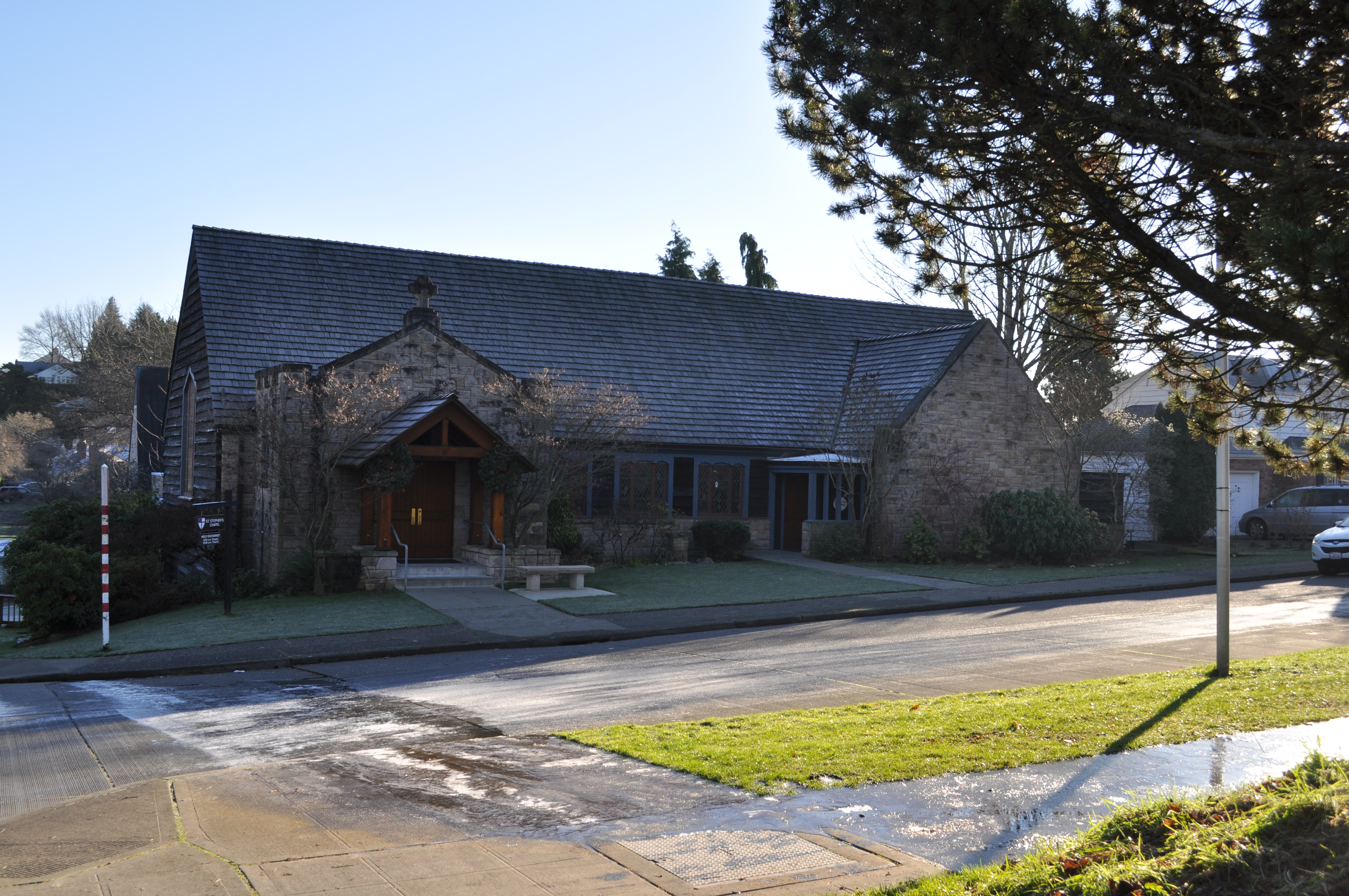

Due to the rapid pace of construction and the increasing scale of his apartment projects, Anhalt found himself over-leveraged during the early years of the Great Depression, as demand for new middle-class housing waned. Unable to secure the capital necessary to pay his debts, the Anhalt Company declared bankruptcy in 1934.

He continued to design smaller scale projects, including the original chapel at St. Stephen's Episcopal Church, in Seattle's Laurelhurst neighborhood. He ultimately left the field in 1942 to open a Shur-Gro Nursery, which won a special award for landscape design from the Seattle chapter of the American Rhododendron Society in 1954. Through the 1950s and 1960s, Anhalt continued to occasionally provide landscape designs for various building projects in Seattle, including the Copenhagen (now Bonneville) apartments.

== Buildings in Seattle ==
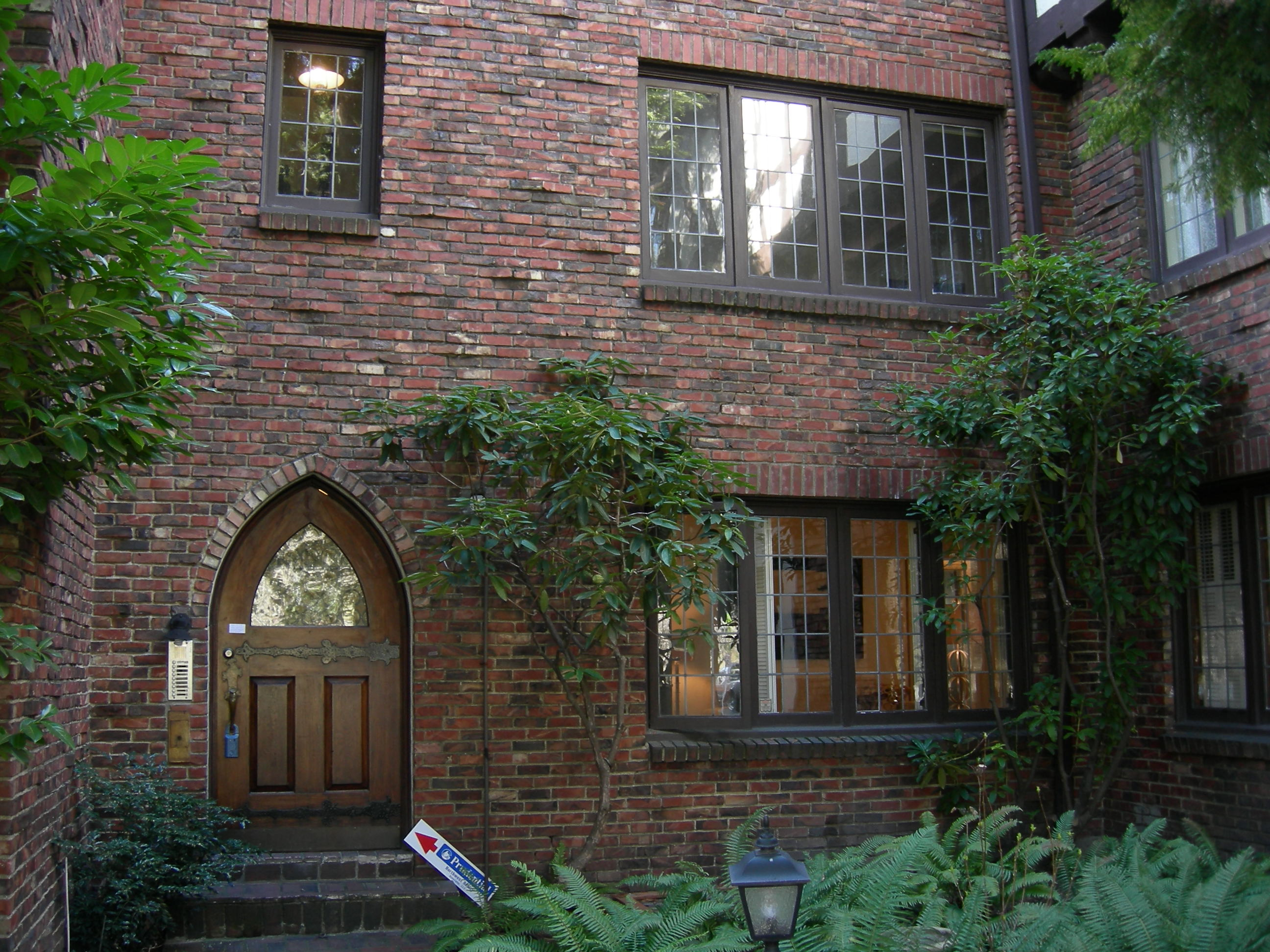
1014 E. Roy Street, an early Anhalt building in Capitol Hill, is a Seattle city landmark.

- 1005 Apartments - 1005 East Roy Street
- Anhalt Apartments - 1600 E John Street
- Anhalt Arms (formerly Berkeley Court) - 1405 E John Street
- Anhalt Hall - 711 NE 43rd Street
- Belmont Court - 750 Belmont Avenue East
- Belmont Place - 710 Belmont Place East
- Borchert Company Apartment Building - 417 Harvard Avenue East
- Oak Manor - 730 Belmont Avenue East
- Tudor Manor - 111 14th Ave East
- La Quinta Apartments - 1710 E Denny Way
- East Roy Street - 1014 East Roy Street
- Twin Gables - 1516 E Republican Street
- Barcelona Court - 2205 Bigelow Avenue North
- Franco Villa - 1108 9th Ave West
- Anhalt Condos - 1201 E. John Street
- Anhalt Capecod 4516 37th Avenue Northeast
- One of the buildings of the Lake Court complex - 2012 43rd Ave. E.
- 1320 Queen Anne Ave N
- 615-625 West McGraw St

== See also ==
- National Register of Historic Places listings in Seattle, Washington
