= AIDS Memorial Pathway =

Memorial and public art installation in Seattle, Washington, U.S.

Coordinates: 47°37′8.5″N 122°19′12.5″W

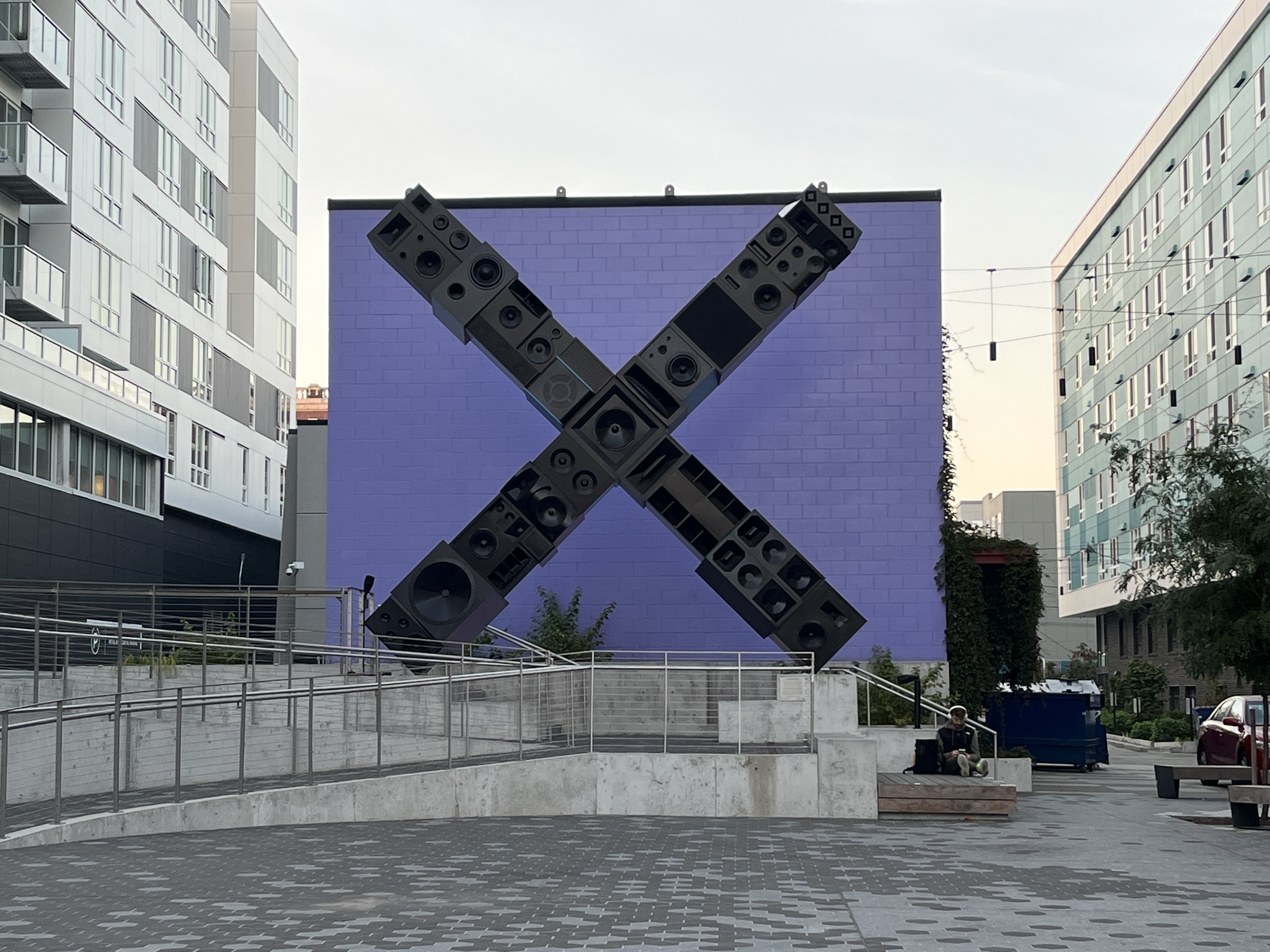
- The sculpture andimgonnamiss-everybody is among several artworks in the memorial
- Interactive map of AIDS Memorial Pathway
- Location: Seattle, Capitol Hill

The AIDS Memorial Pathway (or AMP) is in Seattle's Capitol Hill neighborhood, in the United States. The memorial features Christopher Paul Jordan's andimgonnamisseverybody, described as "an homage to the bars and clubs in which Seattle’s gay community sought refuge", as well as the sculptures Monolith, Serpentine, Lambda, and Ribbon of Light.

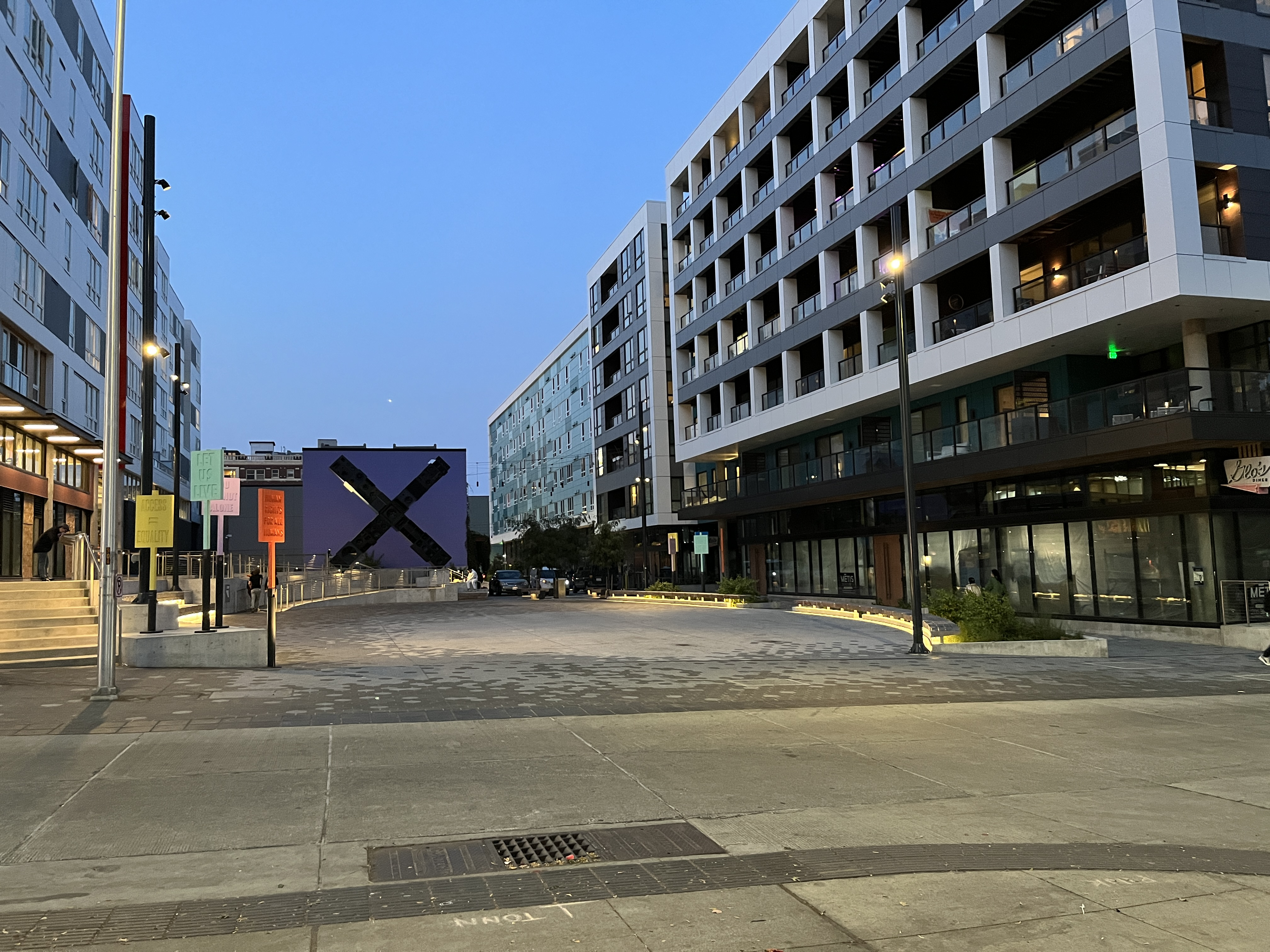

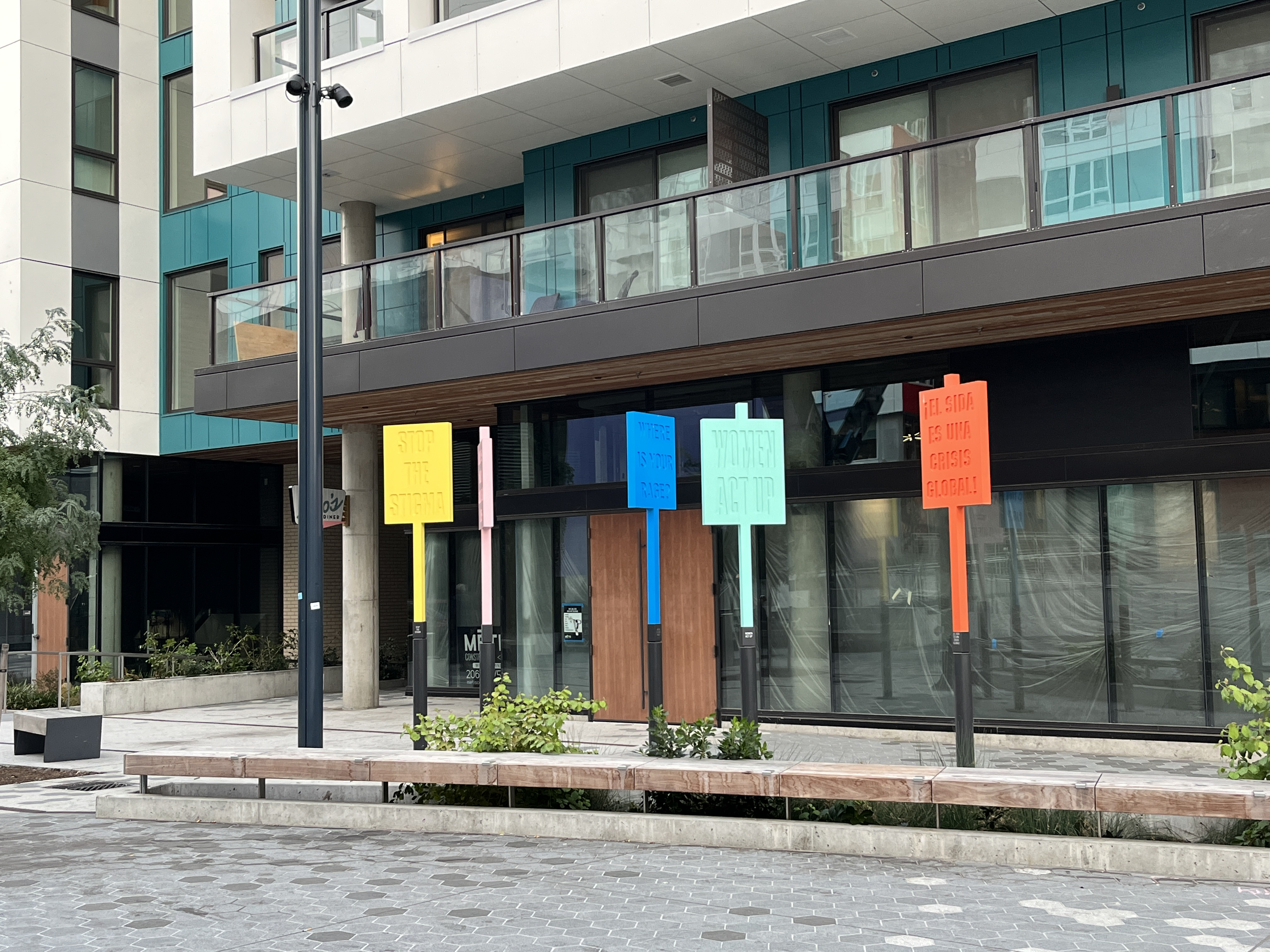
