= Louisa Boren Park =

Park in Seattle

- Louisa Boren Park, looking east over Lake Washington
- Interactive map of Louisa Boren Park
- Type: Park
- Nearest city: Seattle
- Coordinates: 47.634368°N 122.31237°W
- Area: 7.2-acre
- Created: 1913

Louisa Boren Park is a 7.2-acre (29,000 m^{2}) park in Seattle, Washington. A heavily wooded hillside and lookout with views to the northeast of the city, Lake Washington, and the Eastside, it is located at the north end of the Capitol Hill area, adjacent to Interlaken Park, out of which it was created in 1913. It was named after Louisa Boren Denny, wife and sister of Seattle pioneers David Denny and Carson Boren, respectively.

The Seattle Arts Commission commissioned artist Lee Kelly (b. 1932) to create an untitled sculpture for the park in 1975.
