= Blackstone Apartments =

Apartment complex in the United States

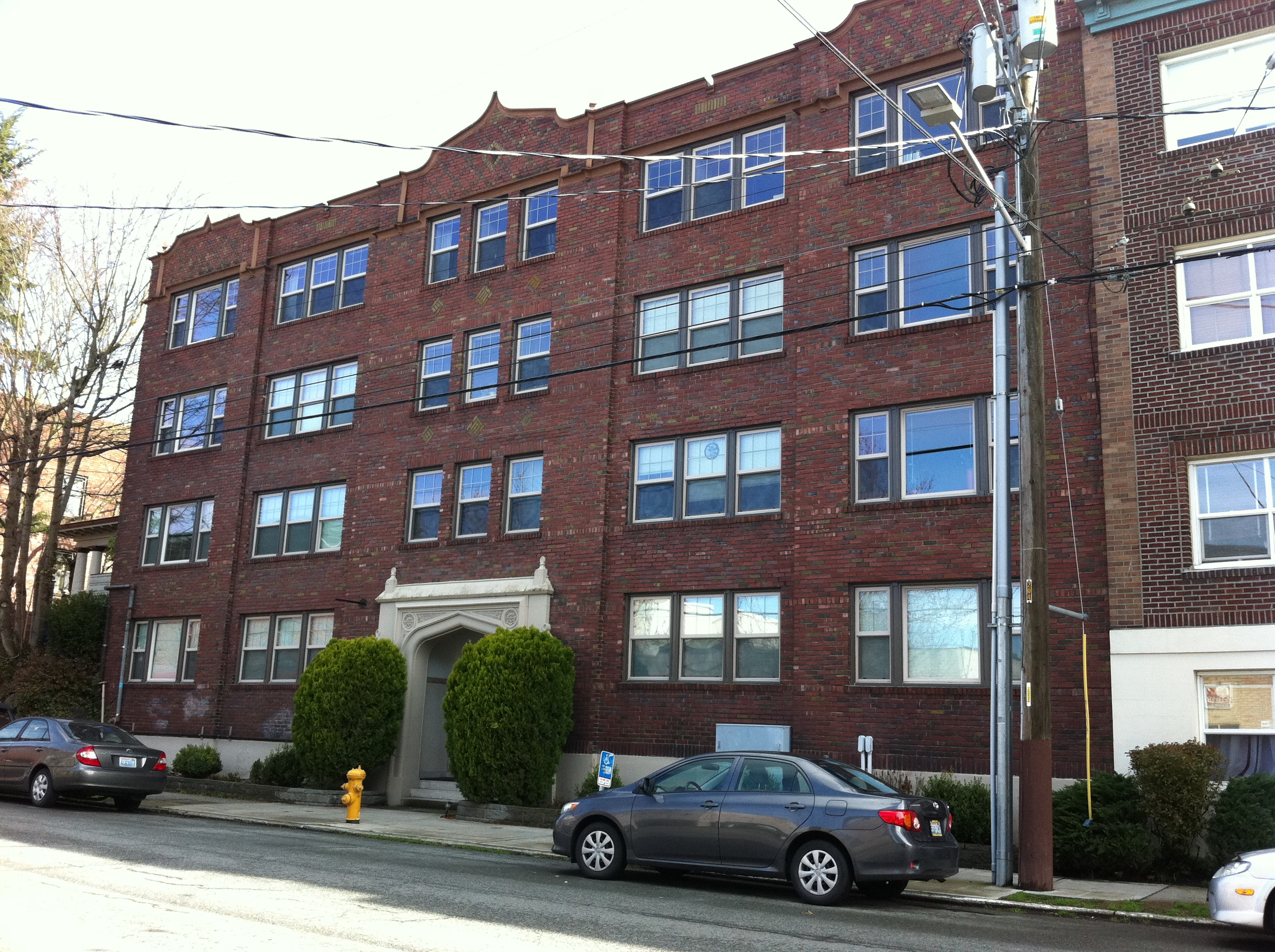
- Interactive map of the Blackstone Apartments area

General information
- Type: Apartment
- Architectural style: Classic Revival
- Location: Capitol Hill, 222 Summit Ave E, Seattle, WA, USA
- Coordinates: 47°37′13″N 122°19′30″W
- Completed: 1927
- Client: J.S. Long

Technical details
- Structural system: Wood Frame
- Floor count: 4

Design and construction
- Architect: J.S. Long
- Main contractor: Long Building Company

The Blackstone Apartments are located at 222 Summit Ave East in the Capitol Hill neighborhood of Seattle, Washington, United States. The apartment complex was designed and owned by J.S. Long and built by the Long Building Company in 1927. The Long Building Company was known for designing and building many of the Bungalow-style homes, particularly in the First Hill neighborhood of Seattle under the guidance of Stanley Long. The building consists of 26 units with a mixture of 2-, 3-, 4-, and 6-room suites; it has a brick exterior with a great deal of mahogany woodwork in the interiors and built-ins throughout the units, and was originally fitted with Monarch electric stoves and Frigidaires. The complex was "regarded as one of the most modern units of its kind in the city" when it was completed.

== History ==
=== The Area ===
In the early 20th century, Capitol Hill was one of the wealthier areas of Seattle. It has since been transformed into a hip, urban area for young professionals; it is known as the gay village in Seattle. The Blackstone Apartments are one of the few pre-World War II complexes remaining in Capitol Hill; post-WWII apartments differed greatly in this area. These newer complexes looked consistent, but with their large windows and courtyards, privacy was lost; they no longer reflected the luxurious apartments which Capitol Hill had once been known for. The Blackstone, however, which also had large windows, had been built with a raised first floor to prevent passersby from peering into the private lives lived inside the units.

=== 1920s Seattle Architecture ===
The 1920s in Seattle saw a change in the style of popular architecture. Inspired by the newness of the country, Seattle architects had expressed freedom in their architectural creations. By this time people's interest in the Arts and Crafts Movement, seen in the popular residential bungalow designs in the early 20th century, was beginning to decline. Design now turned to an eclectic-historic combination, particularly of the Classical Revival and English Revival styles. The Blackstone particularly reflects this turn, combining Classical design elements with modern technology.

=== The Vernacular ===
The early 20th century became a difficult time for architectural identification; no longer could a building be designated as vernacular architecture (folk culture) or as elite architecture (designed by an architect), but rather something in the middle. To contribute to the confusion of identification, most commercial, industrial, and residential buildings in Seattle at this time were designed not by architects but by builders. Because of this, these buildings are often considered to be the best representations of a new kind of architecture in Seattle: popular – vernacular – high-style. The Blackstone Apartments, a residential building designed by a builder and built for the middle to upper class, is a great example of this popular – vernacular – high-style architecture of the pre-WWII era in Seattle.

=== Stock Market Crash ===
Immediately after the Wall Street crash of 1929, some people believed that real estate would be a safer investment than stocks, and many people began to purchase apartment complexes; real estate saw a peak that year in prices, before they began falling as the Great Depression took hold in the country. These investments were particularly popular the weeks preceding the crash in Seattle; only a few weeks after the crash, the Blackstone Apartments became "the largest deal of the kind," selling for $140,000 to John J. Freeley for Mrs. Ada Parfitt. The next closest apartment sale in the Seattle area was for the Rosemont Apartments for $56,000.

== Architect/Owner ==
Not much is known about the complex's designer and original owner, J.S. Long. He was a designer for the Long Building Company, particularly of their Arts and Crafts style bungalows, some of which were featured in The Craftsman magazine. The Sears Catalog Home "The Ashmore," available between 1916 and 1922, is believed to have been based on one of J.S. Long and the Long Building Company's Seattle bungalow designs.

J. S. Long is Stanley Long, as Stanley's obituary on the HistoryLink article regarding him reads "...he leaves wife Blanche". The 1923 Seattle directory shows that J. S. was married to Blanche. There is no listing for a Stanley, and only J. S. is listed as owner in directories.
