= Untitled (Lee Kelly, 1975) =

Sculpture by Lee Kelly in Seattle, Washington, U.S.

- The sculpture in 2013
- Artist: Lee Kelly
- Year: 1975
- Type: Sculpture
- Medium: Cor-Ten steel
- Dimensions: 5.8 m × 4.3 m × 3.0 m (19 ft × 14 ft × 10 ft)
- Condition: "Treatment needed" (1994)
- Location: Seattle, Washington, United States; 47.634331°N 122.312358°W

Untitled is an outdoor 1975 sculpture by Lee Kelly, installed at Louisa Boren Park in Seattle, Washington, in the United States. The abstract, welded Cor-Ten steel piece measures approximately 19 feet (5.8 m) x 14 feet (4.3 m) x 10 feet (3.0 m).

It was surveyed and deemed "treatment needed" by the Smithsonian Institution's "Save Outdoor Sculpture!" program in November 1994. The work is part of the Seattle One Percent for Art Collection and administered by the Seattle Arts Commission.

== See also ==
- 1975 in art
- List of works by Lee Kelly
