= Interlaken Park =

Park in Seattle, Washington, United States

Coordinates: 47°38′13.7″N 122°18′33.9″W

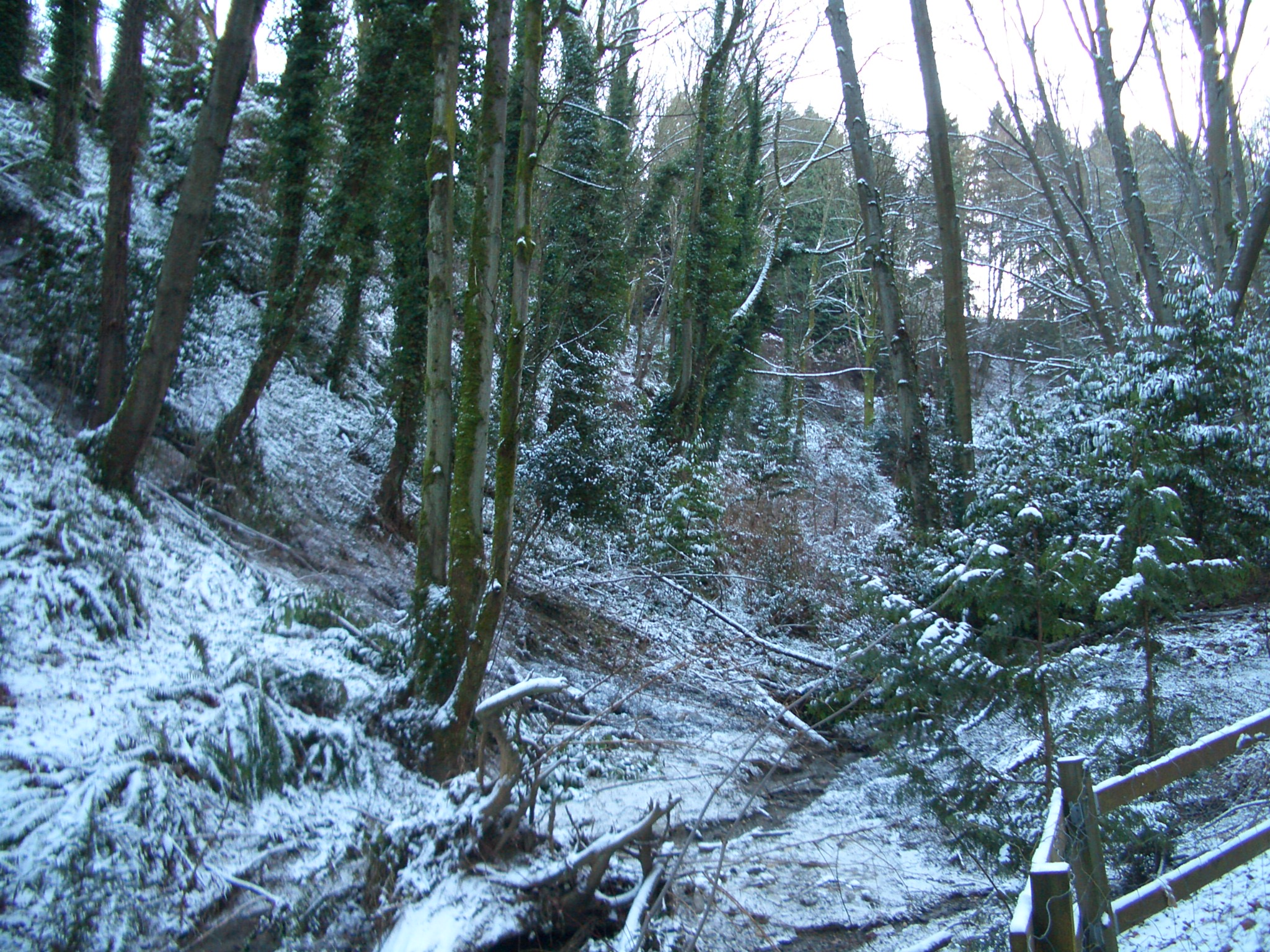
- Interactive map of Interlaken Park
- Location: Seattle, Washington, US

Interlaken Park is a 51.7-acre (0.209 km^{2}) park in Seattle, Washington. A heavily wooded hillside and ravine, it forms the division between Capitol Hill to the south and Montlake to the north. Interlaken Drive E. runs through the park north to south, and E. Interlaken Boulevard, part of which is now closed to traffic, does so northwest to southeast. Louisa Boren Park, once part of Interlaken Park, lies directly south.
