= Stealth Starbucks =

Starbucks coffeehouse

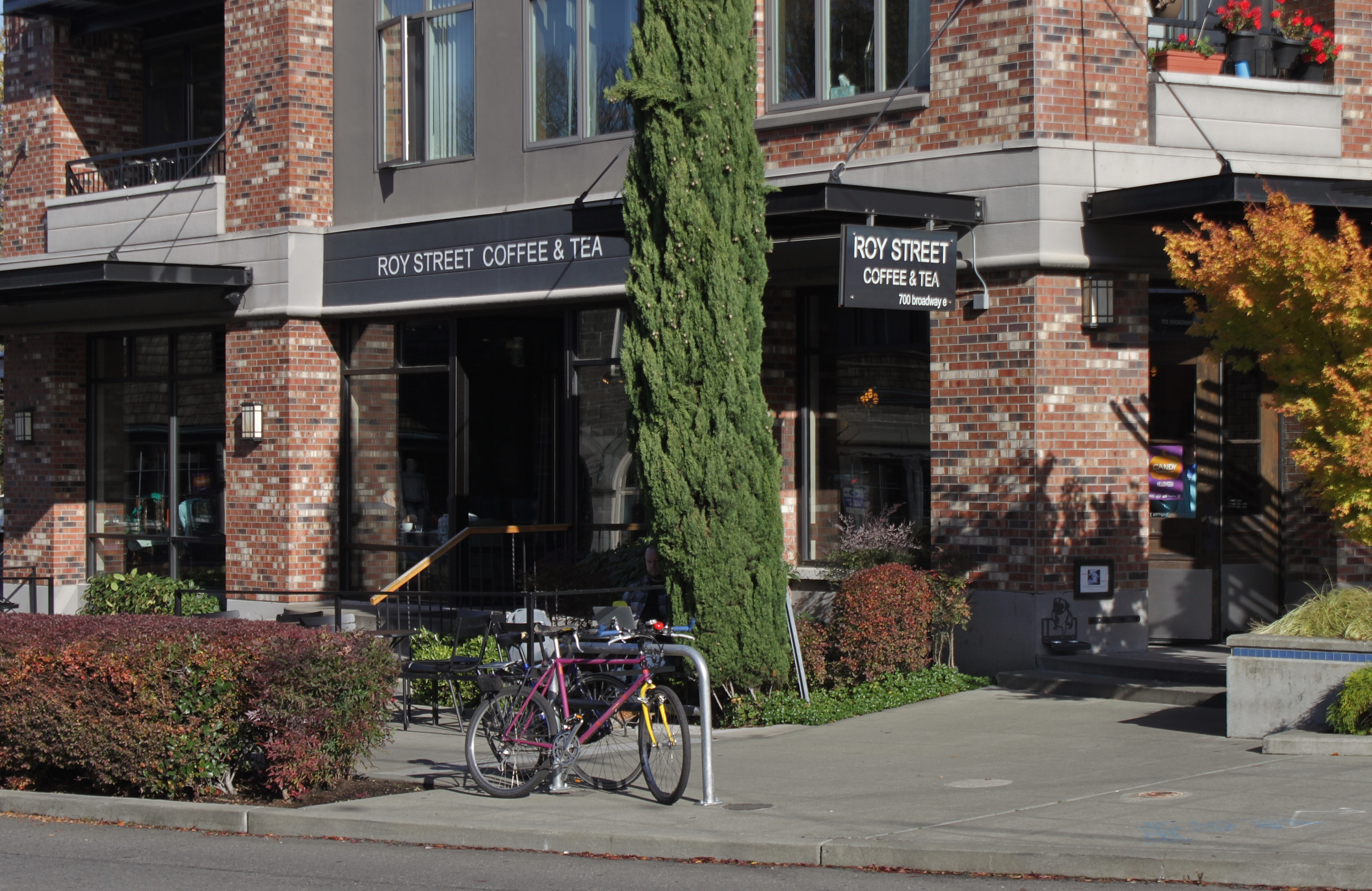
Roy Street Coffee & Tea in Seattle, an example of a stealth Starbucks

A stealth Starbucks is a Starbucks coffeehouse that does not advertise the Starbucks brand. These stores are operated in metropolitan areas to do market research on how customers react to experiments in coffee service and coffeehouse design.

== Appearance ==
These stores do not exhibit the traditional icons of the Starbucks brand, including the siren logo, the green aprons for baristas, and the Starbucks-specific "tall, grande, venti" coffee size terminology. The door of the coffeehouse says, "Inspired by Starbucks".

== Locations ==
The first Stealth Starbucks opened in 2009. In that year, at least three stores in Seattle were de-branded to remove the logo and brand name and remodel the stores as local coffee houses "inspired by Starbucks." CEO Howard Schultz says the unbranded stores are a "laboratory for Starbucks". The first, 15th Avenue Coffee and Tea, opened in July 2009 on Capitol Hill. It served wine and beer, and hosted live music and poetry readings. It was remodeled and reopened as a Starbucks-branded store in 2011, and later closed in 2017. Another, Roy Street Coffee and Tea at 700 Broadway E., also on Capitol Hill opened in November as a "Tudor-style coffeehouse".

Although the stores have been called "stealth Starbucks" and criticized as "local-washing", Schultz says that "It wasn't so much that we were trying to hide the brand, but trying to do things in those stores that we did not feel were appropriate for Starbucks."

The second floor of Macy's Herald Square in New York City has a non-branded Starbucks store, called the Herald Square Cafe.
