= Harvard-Belmont Landmark District =

Historic district in Washington, United States

- Harvard-Belmont District
- U.S. National Register of Historic Places
- U.S. Historic district
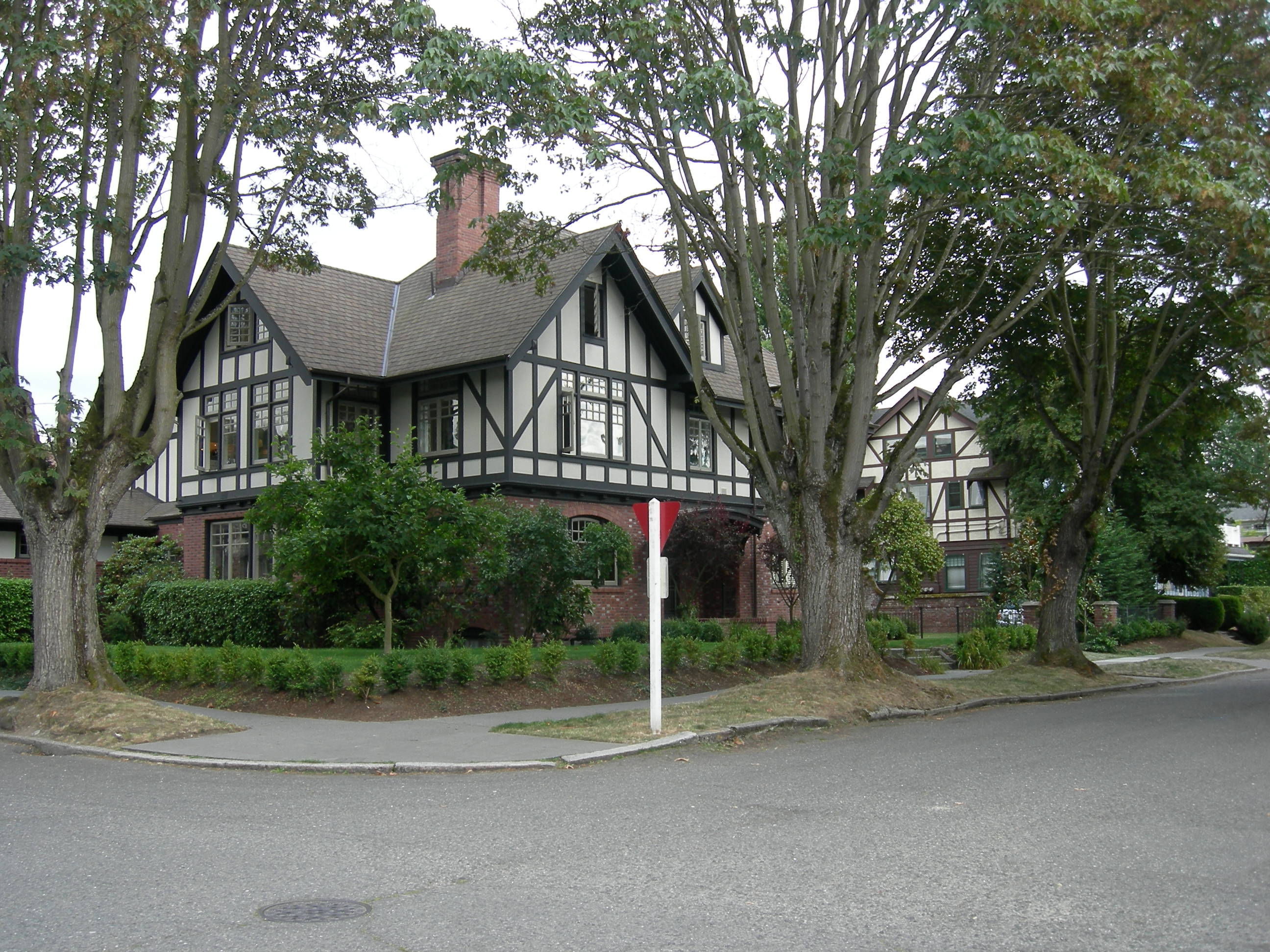
- A house in the district at 954 Broadway E
- Location: Bellevue Pl., Broadway, Boylston and Harvard Avenues, Seattle, Washington
- Coordinates: 47.625°N 122.325°W
- Area: 34 acres (14 ha)
- Built: 1900–1910
- Architectural style: Victorian, neoclassical, neo-Georgian, Colonial Revival, Tudor
- Website: seattle.gov
- NRHP reference No.: 82004237
- Added to NRHP: May 13, 1982

The Harvard-Belmont Landmark District is a part of Capitol Hill in Seattle, Washington, United States, listed on the National Register of Historic Places.

It is notable for the architectural styles displayed by homes there: Victorian, neoclassical, neo-Georgian, Colonial, and Tudor. Most were built between 1900 and 1910. The wave of construction by the Seattle wealthy began with Horace C. Henry's 1901 mansion.

== See also ==
- Loveless Building
