= Mac Smiff =

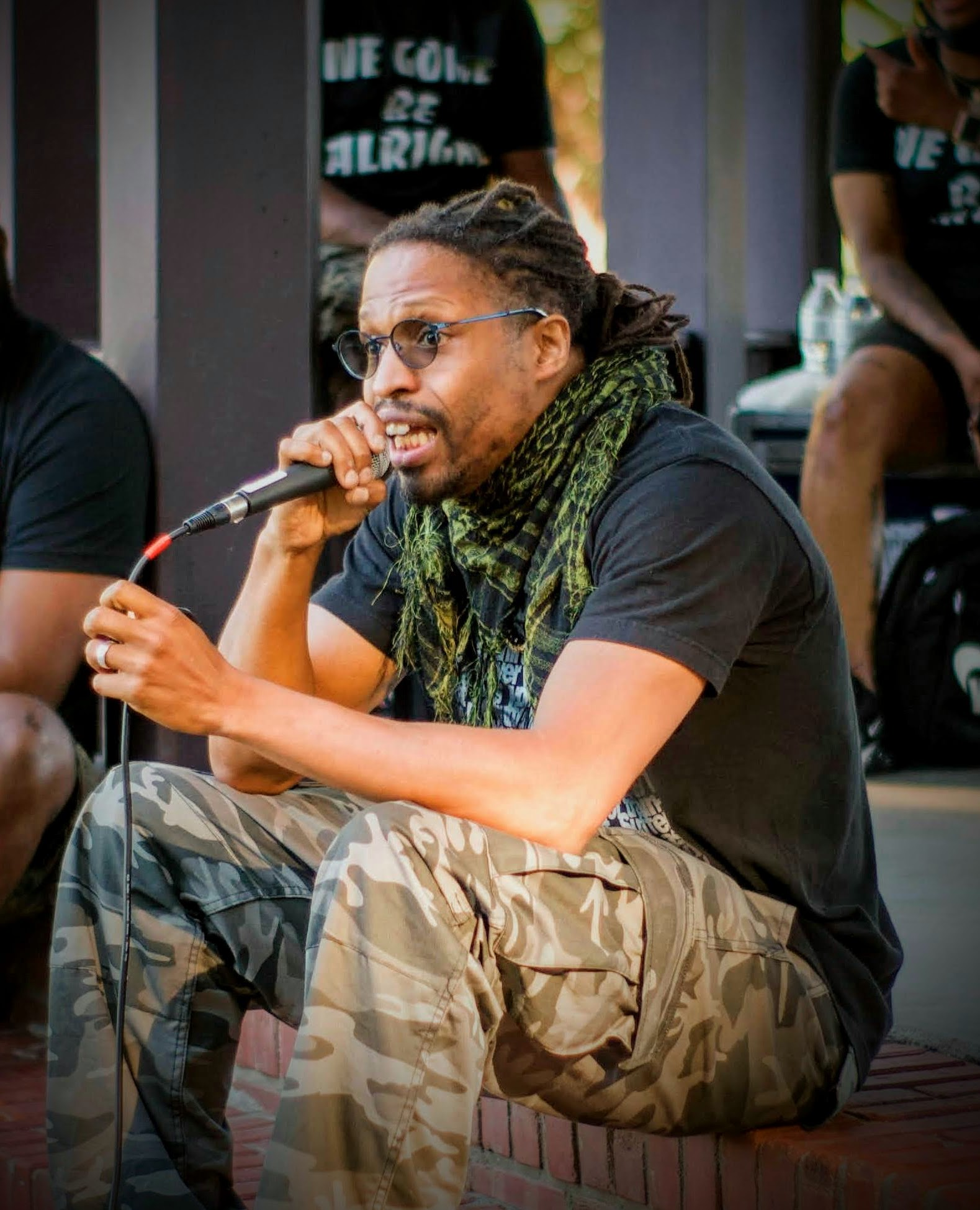
Mac Smiff speaking at a Black Lives Matter event in North Portland, August 2020

Fahiym Acuay (born January 29, 1981), better known as Mac Smiff, is a journalist and activist in Portland, Oregon, United States. He is the editor of We Out Here, a regional hip hop online magazine. He is a well known figure in the Black Lives Matter movement, especially for his calls to defund the Portland Police Bureau. Smiff received attention during the 2020 protests following the murder of George Floyd. His work has been published in The Oregonian, the Portland Mercury, and Vortex Music Magazine.

Smiff was born in Queens, New York and moved to the Portland metropolitan area at age 11. He spent his early years as a rapper, advocate and writer for hip-hop music. In 2013, after authoring an article about SXSW in We Out Here, Smiff assumed the editor-in-chief role.

Smiff is a plaintiff in a group lawsuit against the United States Department of Homeland Security and other federal agencies for an injury sustained while covering the protests in downtown Portland. In addition to physical injuries, Smiff has received death threats.
