= E. D. Mondainé =

American pastor and activist (1959–2025)

Elbert Darrell ("E. D.") Mondainé

Personal life
- Born: February 21, 1959
- Died: August 25, 2025 (aged 66)

Religious life
- Religion: Christianity
- Denomination: Southern Baptist Convention
- Founder of: Celebration Tabernacle Church
- Ordination: 1982

Elbert Darrell ("E. D.") Mondainé (1959–2025) was a pastor and political activist in Portland in the U.S. state of Oregon.

He was ordained in 1982 as a Southern Baptist minister. He moved to Portland in 1985. In Portland, he founded the Celebration Tabernacle church in 1988 and gradually became influential in local politics. He became president of the local chapter of the NAACP in 2018. He initially ran for reelection in 2020, but after an "accountability group" of NAACP members, Rise Up PDX, ran a slate of candidates against his administration and the Portland Mercury published an exposé alleging criminal and unethical behavior throughout his career, he dropped his reelection bid on October 15. Two days after the Mercury story was published, the chapter board voted 7-3 for Mondainé's immediate resignation. Mondainé initially refused to step down, and was quoted in the Mercury asserting that the board was in fact standing by him. He resigned as Portland NAACP president effective immediately on Tuesday October 20, 2020, though he may have retained a title of second vice-president of the Oregon-Washington-Alaska regional chapter of the organization.

== Early and personal life ==
Mondainé grew up in a housing project in St. Louis, where he learned to play piano. He married the mother of his twin sons, Christopher and Elbert Jr., in July 1994. They divorced the following year. He was later married and divorced again.

Mondainé died August 25, 2025.

== Religious leadership ==
Mondainé founded the Celebration Tabernacle church, an unaffiliated church close to the Pentecostal tradition, in 1988. The church was originally on North Lombard St., and soon moved to the intersection of North Kilpatrick and North Denver streets. The congregation was about 100 people in 1994 and 200 in 1998; many were young and financially challenged. By 2004, the church had opened or was in the process of launching 10 businesses (including the former Friday's Espresso, now Po'Shines), and was described as an engine of economic development in the surrounding Kenton neighborhood.

We don't allow you to be a victim here. You can only be a victim as long as you let yourself be a victim.

— Mondainé, describing the church in 1998

In 2006, Mondainé organized church leaders across the country for an event condemning school violence, and brought members of his own congregations from Portland and St. Louis. The "Voices of a Thousand Angels" concert was held in Lancaster, Pennsylvania.

== Political and civic activities ==
By 2017, Mondainé had become a vice president of the Portland chapter of the NAACP. After Jo Ann Hardesty stepped down in March 2017 during her successful run for Portland City Council, Mondainé was elected president in 2018. He sat on the hiring board that recommended Danielle Outlaw as chief of the Portland Police Bureau in 2017, and praised her when she suddenly resigned at the end of 2019.

In November 2019, leadership and members of the NAACP accused Mondainé of abusing his position with "misogyny, physical threats and mismanagement of money". The chapter rescheduled an executive meeting to subvert community involvement. In response to the allegations, Mondainé referenced President Donald Trump, stating "It grieves me to think that we would have the energy to fight with each other, knowing that we have a racist politician in the highest office of the land."

In his roles with the church and the NAACP, and as a musician, Mondainé has advocated policy positions throughout his career including rallying against labeling unreinforced masonry buildings. He gave a speech in downtown Portland during the 2020 George Floyd protests.

Following allegations of sexism, bullying, and financial impropriety in 2019, an "accountability group" of NAACP members organized under the name Rise Up PDX, challenging Mondainé and four of his fellow officers in the 2020 NAACP election. Sharon Gary-Smith, Tamia Dreary, Donovan Smith, Natalie Rush, Rhyan M. Hills, Michael "Chappie" Grice, Cynthia Fowler, Leesha Posey, Albert Lee, Susan Elliott, Beth Woodward, Daniel Portis-Cathers, and Lily Copenagle are running to replace current officers and at-large positions. Mondainé sent "letters of dismissal" to several members opposing him, but the national NAACP organization stated that he had no power to remove them from membership.

Mondainé and the local NAACP were represented on the website of a coalition called United for Portland as endorsing the reelection of Portland mayor Ted Wheeler. Rise Up PDX issued a press release, alleging that NAACP branch membership was not consulted on the decision, and that the bylaws of the NAACP prohibit such an endorsement. The text was removed from the website within 24 hours, and Mondainé stated to local news outlets that his endorsement was not on behalf of the NAACP.

=== Commentary on Black Lives Matter protests ===
Mondainé gave a speech in downtown Portland during the 2020 George Floyd protests. On July 23, 2020, The Washington Post published an op-ed by Mondainé, where he blamed protesters as co-opting the Black Lives Matter movement. His op-ed was followed by interviews with news outlets such as National Public Radio and CNN. Locally, founders of the Black Resilience Fund contested the views represented by Mondainé in the essay, suggesting that the discomfort and messiness of protests are necessary to the effort to effect change.
