= Cory Elia =

American journalist

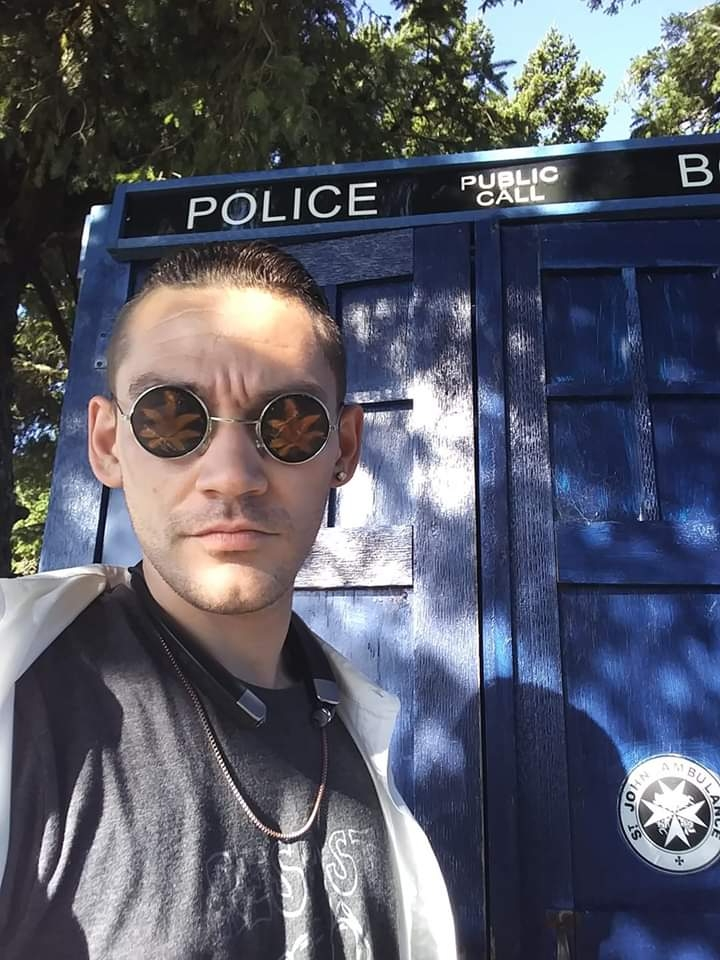
Cory Elia

Cory Elia is a journalist based in Portland, Oregon. He is managing editor of Village Portland, a volunteer reporter and podcast host at KBOO.

== Reporting ==
Elia's footage has been used for national-level coverage, including regarding the August 2019 assault on Andy Ngo and the August 2020 New York Times and Washington Post coverage of the Killings of Aaron Danielson and Michael Reinoehl.

== 2020 George Floyd protest coverage ==
Elia says he was injured multiple times by police while covering the George Floyd protests in Portland, Oregon. By mid-June, he was on separate occasions pepper-sprayed and beaten with police batons. On June 2, after police struck Elia several times, causing his head to strike a concrete wall, Elia sought treatment at a hospital. Following the incident, police denied that video coverage of the event depicted what Elia described. The incident was referred to the Independent Police Review board. Police argue that media were told to leave the area following a declaration an unlawful assembly was declared, a position that the local chapter of the Society of Professional Journalists strongly opposes and calls an unlawful restriction.

On 30 June, Elia and two other independent reporter, Lesley McLam and Justin Yau, were arrested while covering the protest. A video taken by Elia just prior to arrest shows Elia telling an officer that Elia recognized him from a previous night of protests. A group of police shortly thereafter rushes Elia, pushes him down, and arrests him. On July 1, the Oregon Speaker of the House, Tina Kotek, lambasted the Portland Police Bureau in an open letter, referring among other things to the arrests of Elia and two other independent journalists. Following the arrest, a district court placed a two-week restraining order on the Portland police, barring them from arresting, using force against, or seizing recording equipment and press passes from journalists and legal observers. The decision noted that police chose to arrest Elia and the two other journalists after they were made aware of their press credentials. Later that month, Elia and McLam filed a suit against the city, the second of at least three suits filed against the city on behalf of journalists that month. On June 3, Elia said that on account of exhaustion and seizure of his equipment, he would no longer cover the protests.

== Personal life ==
Now age 37, Elia lived his early life in southeastern Portland, Oregon. In the mid-2010s, Elia worked for FedEx. After a major back injury, Elia began self-medicating with marijuana. Due to the drug's illegal status in Oregon at the time, Elia was fired from FedEx, leading to homelessness and a methamphetamine addiction. Elia describes coverage of homelessness as a major aspect of his journalism.

After three years of homelessness, Elia received housing and entered recovery. In 2018, he was a junior at a local college and spent time volunteering. Elia was a 2020-21 Portland State University's Student Media Board member.
