= George Floyd protests in Portland, Oregon =

2020 civil unrest after the murder of George Floyd

- Part of the 2020–2023 United States racial unrest, the Black Lives Matter movement, the George Floyd protests in Oregon, and the George Floyd protests
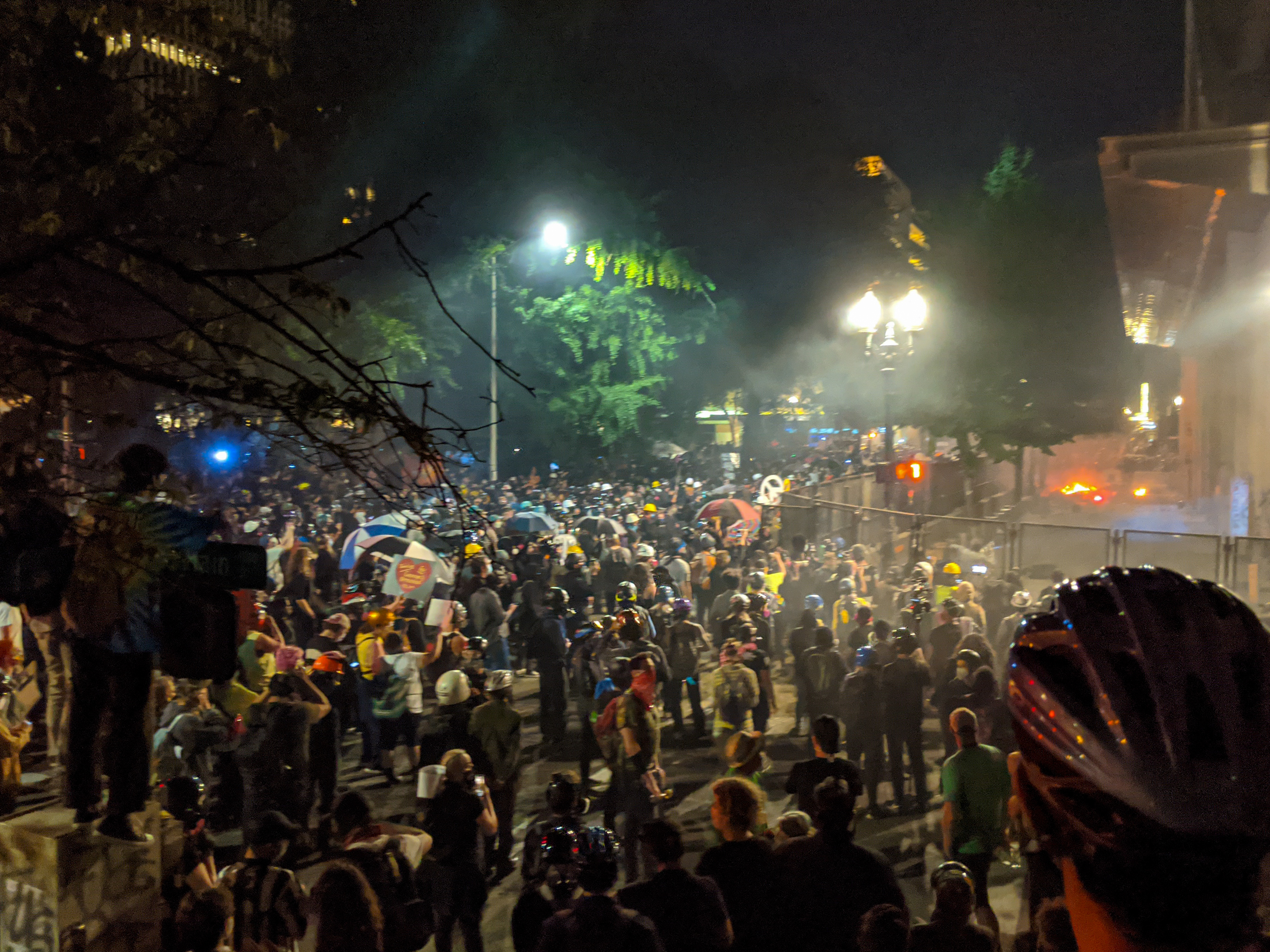
- Protesters surround the perimeter fence of the Hatfield United States Courthouse on July 22, 2020
- Date: May 28, 2020 – May 29, 2021
- Location: Portland, Oregon, United States
- Caused by: Murder of George Floyd; Racial injustice in the United States; Police brutality in the United States; Shooting of Jacob Blake
- Goals: Defunding the police; Resignation of Mayor Ted Wheeler
- Methods: Protests; Civil unrest; Riots; Looting; Arson

Parties
Local protestors: Black Lives Matter; NAACP; Democratic Socialists of America; Pacific Northwest Youth Liberation Front	United States Federal Government: Department of Homeland Security; United States Marshals Service; United States Border Patrol; State of Oregon: Oregon State Police; Multnomah County Sheriff's Office; Portland Police Bureau	Right-wing counter protestors: Proud Boys; Patriot Prayer

Lead figures
	Chad Wolf; Kate Brown; Mike Reese; Ted Wheeler; Jami Resch; Chuck Lovell	Joey Gibson

Number
1,000+	Unknown	Unknown

Casualties
- Deaths: 1
- Injuries: Unknown
- Arrested: 970+

Starting in May 2020, protests following the murder of George Floyd were held in the city of Portland, Oregon, concurrent with protests in other cities in the United States and around the world. By July 2020, many of the protests, which had been held every day since May 28, drew more than 1,000 participants. Protests continued into August, September, and October 2020, often drawing hundreds.

While starting out as mostly peaceful demonstrations, by late summer of 2020 riots had exceeded peaceful protests in number and percentage overall. By September of 2020, demonstrations often involved arson, property damage (mostly concentrated in Downtown Portland), looting and vandalism. This pattern of escalation occurred gradually over the summer months, with a notable increase following federal intervention at the downtown courthouse. Confrontations became concentrated in specific areas of downtown Portland, particularly near federal buildings and the Justice Center. By late summer, these incidents had affected public perception to the extent that a majority of Oregonians had come to view the events as riots rather than protests. In response, the US deployed BORTAC and the US Marshals, which heated confrontations with law enforcement and counter-protesters, and prompted increased use of tear gas and other weapons. One person was shot and killed in the aftermath of a clash between protesters and counter-protesters.

In early July, the federal government deployed law enforcement officers to Portland for the stated purpose of protecting federal property amid the unrest. The deployment was criticized for not clearly identifying officers and for seizing protesters not on or near federal property, including by Portland's mayor and most of the state's congressional delegation. The U.S. Customs and Border Protection service defended the practice on the grounds of protecting the officers' personal safety. Several lawsuits were filed by and on behalf of journalists and legal observers against local and federal law enforcement, and by the state against several federal agencies.

Protests continued in Portland in the aftermath of the 2020 United States presidential election, as well as after the January 20, 2021 inauguration of Joe Biden. Protests also occurred near the ICE facility, and clashes occurred with police.

== Background ==
The protests were initially precipitated by the murder of George Floyd, a black man, by police in Minneapolis. The New York Times reported that demonstrators in Portland, including some who identify as Antifa, the loose coalition of self-described anti-fascist activists, have had years of conflict with law enforcement. Other recent police killings of people of color, including Breonna Taylor, Elijah McClain, and the shooting of Jacob Blake contributed to the national and local unrest driving the protests.

Protesters also drew attention to a number of black people killed by local police. The Oregonian identified the 2003 shooting of Kendra James as an inflection point that galvanized the Black community and inspired a movement to fundamentally reimagine law enforcement. The Oregonian reported that the 39 people killed by Portland police between 2003 and 2020 were disproportionately Black. Among those killed since 2003 are Aaron Campbell, Quanice Hayes, and Patrick Kimmons.

== Organizers ==
A number of different organizations led demonstrations, including Rose City Justice and the Albina Ministerial Alliance. The Facebook and Twitter accounts associated with the Pacific Northwest Youth Liberation Front (or PNW Youth Liberation Front) served as "information hubs" for sharing protest plans. The group did not have identifiable leaders and described itself as a "decentralized network of autonomous youth collectives dedicated to direct action towards total liberation". The groups' Facebook and Twitter accounts were created in February 2017, and amassed 6,100 and 28,700 followers, respectively, as of late July 2020. The group has used a black flag emoji, which often symbolizes anarchism. Children took leadership roles in some demonstrations, in Portland and across the country.

== Demonstrations ==
=== May ===
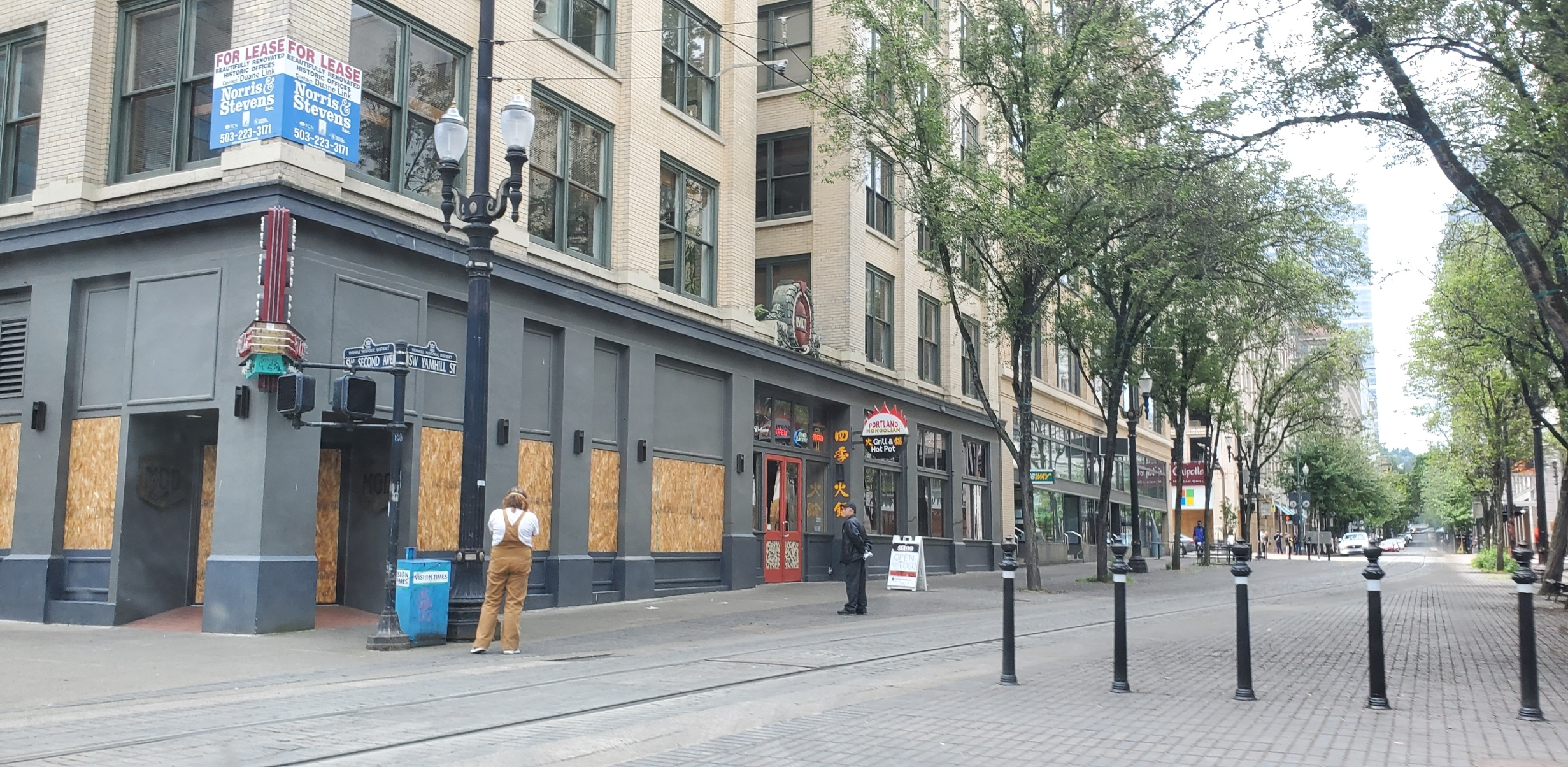
Boarded windows in downtown Portland on May 31, 2020, following a series of demonstrations

Hundreds of demonstrators gathered on May 28, at one point blocking the entrance to the Multnomah County Justice Center. There were two demonstrations held on May 29. A "Eulogy for Black America" was organized by the Portland chapter of NAACP at Terry Schrunk Plaza in downtown Portland, and a vigil was organized by the PNW Youth Liberation Front at Peninsula Park, in the Piedmont neighborhood of north Portland.

Crowd estimates for the demonstration at Terry Schrunk Plaza ranged from a "hundred or so" to "hundreds" of people; the event included several speakers including Portland City Commissioner Jo Ann Hardesty. She was reportedly "visibly overcome by emotion" and said, "This is the reality of being black in America. Over and over and over again, black people have been killed, and there has been silence from the majority community. ... Black people are tired. Black people are exhausted by racism." The president of the Portland NAACP chapter, E. D. Mondainé, also spoke.

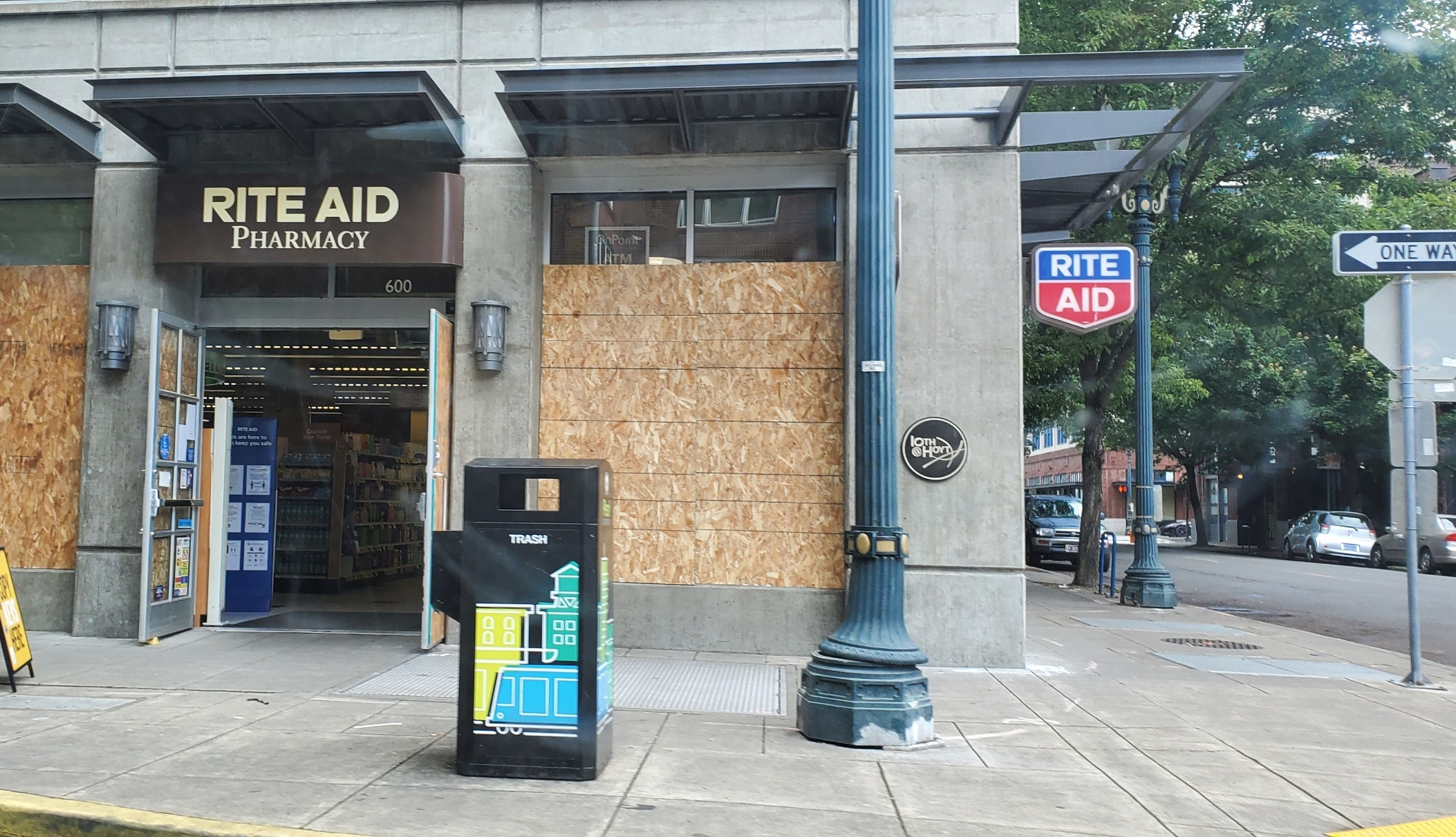
Boarded windows at a Rite Aid in the Pearl District on May 31, 2020

More than 1,000 people gathered at Peninsula Park, where ministers and Black Panthers spoke against police brutality. From the crowd, hundreds marched to downtown Portland via Martin Luther King Jr. Blvd. and the Burnside Bridge. Along the way, some people started breaking windows, tagging buildings with graffiti, looting, and setting vehicles and buildings on fire. A riot ensued, prompting Mayor Ted Wheeler to declare a state of emergency. A fire was started inside the Multnomah County Justice Center. Pioneer Place and other storefronts saw looting. The riot lasted for approximately 5 hours; two officers were injured, and 13 people were arrested. The Portland Business Alliance estimated the riot cost local businesses "tens of millions" of dollars because of property damage, looting, and lost wages.

On May 30, Rev. Mondainé posted a video online urging protesters to stay home and calling looting and violence counterproductive. Demonstrators gathered in downtown Portland again; crowd estimates ranged from hundreds to a thousand. One group attempted to break into the Lloyd Center; riot police broke up a group of approximately 200 people outside the shopping mall. Police said that a fire was set inside the Portland Law and Justice Center during the protests. Police declared that they had arrested 16 people by 11 p.m. At least 51 demonstrators were arrested during the night, bringing the total number of arrests to date to 64.

External videos
- Portland Police take a knee with protesters on YouTube (The Oregonian)
- Protest at Laurelhurst Park over the death of George Floyd on YouTube (The Oregonian)
- Protesters march through Southeast Portland on YouTube (The Oregonian)

On the afternoon of May 31, a crowd assembled at the intersection of Southwest 3rd Avenue and Main Street in downtown. At one point, in a show of solidarity with Black Lives Matter, some police officers took a knee alongside protesters. By nightfall there were approximately 6,000 demonstrators and protesters. Shortly after the curfew took effect at 8 p.m., police dispersed the crowd outside the Multnomah County Justice Center using tear gas. Separately, an estimated 7,000 to 10,000 people gathered at Laurelhurst Park in southeast Portland, and others assembled outside a former police precinct at the intersection of East Burnside Street and 47th Avenue. Police did not intervene as the group marched from the Multnomah County Justice Center to Pioneer Courthouse Square and back. The Pearl District Neighborhood Association was "advised of potential protest activity" in the Pearl District and the Northwest District. Around 11:30 p.m., saying projectiles were thrown at officers, police declared "a civil disturbance and unlawful assembly" and ordered protesters to leave.

=== June ===
On June 1, three demonstrations were organized in Portland. One was held at the intersection of Northeast Sandy and 57th. Others were planned in downtown and at the intersection of Southeast Stark Street and 13th Avenue. More than 1,000 protesters staged a die-in on the Burnside Bridge, then continued to downtown's Pioneer Courthouse Square. Following two hours of speeches, chants, and music, demonstrators returned to the city's east side via the same bridge. Portland Police allowed use of the bridge, and the evening's events remained mostly peaceful.

On the fifth day of protests, hundreds gathered at Pioneer Courthouse Square then staged another die-in on the Burnside Bridge. A second demonstration was organized at Revolution Hall. By the evening, thousands had gathered at Pioneer Courthouse Square. One group returned to the Burnside Bridge, while hundreds remained in the square. Around 8 p.m., the two groups merged and numbered approximately 10,000. The demonstrations were mostly peaceful until later in the evening; most protesters marched across the Burnside Bridge, but police used stun grenades and tear gas on a smaller, separate group of people who were throwing projectiles. Police arrested several people, and 16 were detained. Elsewhere in the metropolitan area, there were demonstrations in Cedar Mill and at Tualatin's Lake at the Commons.

The first few days of June were identified, as of July 8, as having the largest crowds of the Portland George Floyd protests, exceeding 10,000 people. Portland Police Bureau (PPB) declared a riot at one of the protests in early June. Arson, looting, and vandalism, and injuries to two officers were reported since the demonstrations began on May 28. Approximately 100 people had been arrested as of June 2, 2020.

Several thousand people demonstrated on June 3, gathering at Tom McCall Waterfront Park, where Rev. Mondainé and others spoke. Later, groups splintered, with many gathering outside the Multnomah County Justice Center once again. There were other small protests throughout the city, including one in north Portland's Columbia Park and another at Pioneer Courthouse Square. The Oregonian reported an overall crowd size of approximately 8,000.

Thousands demonstrated on June 4. The protests were peaceful until late at night, and twelve arrests were made. Damian Lillard helped lead thousands across the Morrison Bridge into downtown, where protests gathered at Waterfront Park.

There were multiple demonstrations planned on June 5. Don't Shoot Portland organized the "George Floyd Memorial and Benefit Show" at Laurelwood Park. In the Woodstock neighborhood, the family-friendly "Black Lives Matter March & Rally" saw up to 2,000 people march from the All Saints Episcopal along Southeast Woodstock to 52nd, and no incidents requiring police intervention. Demonstrators also gathered at Revolution Hall for the "No Justice No Peace Rally & March". Portland Trail Blazers players Rodney Hood, Nassir Little, and Anfernee Simons all joined. In the evening, protesters pushed down fencing in front of the Multnomah County Justice Center and police used gas and stun grenades for crowd dispersal.

Footage of the BLM march at NE 15th Ave. between Broadway & Fremont on June 7, 2020

On June 7 in Portland, outside the city's Justice Center, 48 people were jailed in protest. The protest and march originated at Pioneer Courthouse Square. Demonstrators gathered at Southeast Stark Street and 12th Avenue on June 9. There were approximately 500 people outside the Multnomah County Justice Center by 9 p.m.

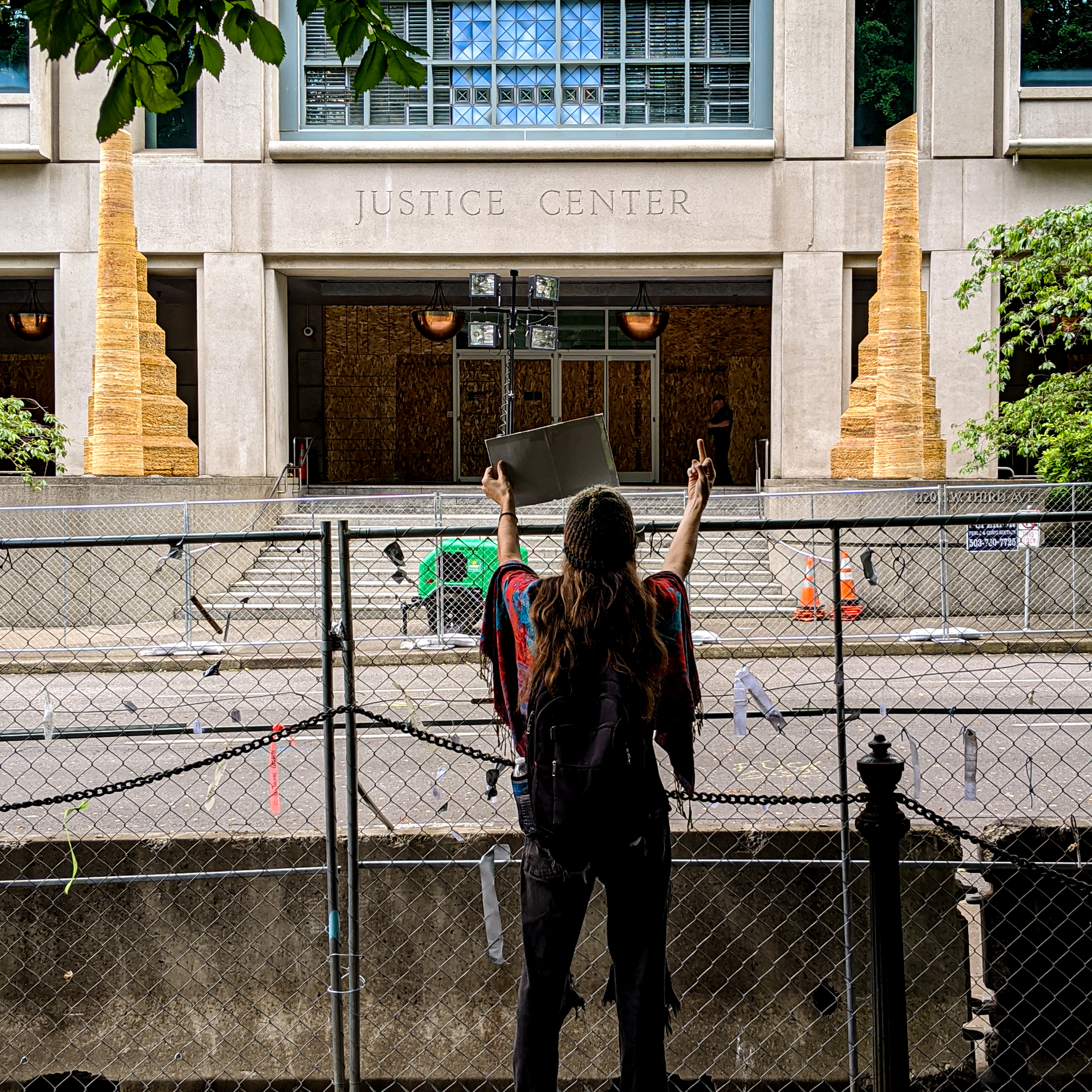
Daytime protester in front of the Multnomah County Justice Center on June 10, 2020

On June 10, an afternoon rally to disband the Portland Police was held in Terry Schrunk Plaza. In the evening a ride leaving Irving Park was organized by Portland's chapter of Black Girls Do Bike. Several thousand people marched from Southeast Stark Street and 12th Avenue to Unthank Park. Protesters failed to create an autonomous zone similar to Seattle's Capitol Hill Autonomous Zone. Approximately 1,000 people demonstrated on June 11 after an already-planned city budget meeting led to historic levels of public comment, with one city commissioner, Chloe Eudaly, voting "no," stating that the proposed cuts to the police bureau fell short of what demonstrators were calling for. A unanimous vote was required to pass the budget. "While my colleague can take a principled 'no' stance on passing this budget, I as a Black woman cannot," Commissioner Hardesty responded in a statement. "I do not want to let this detract from the very real steps taken, but it is an important reminder on what performative allyship looks like."

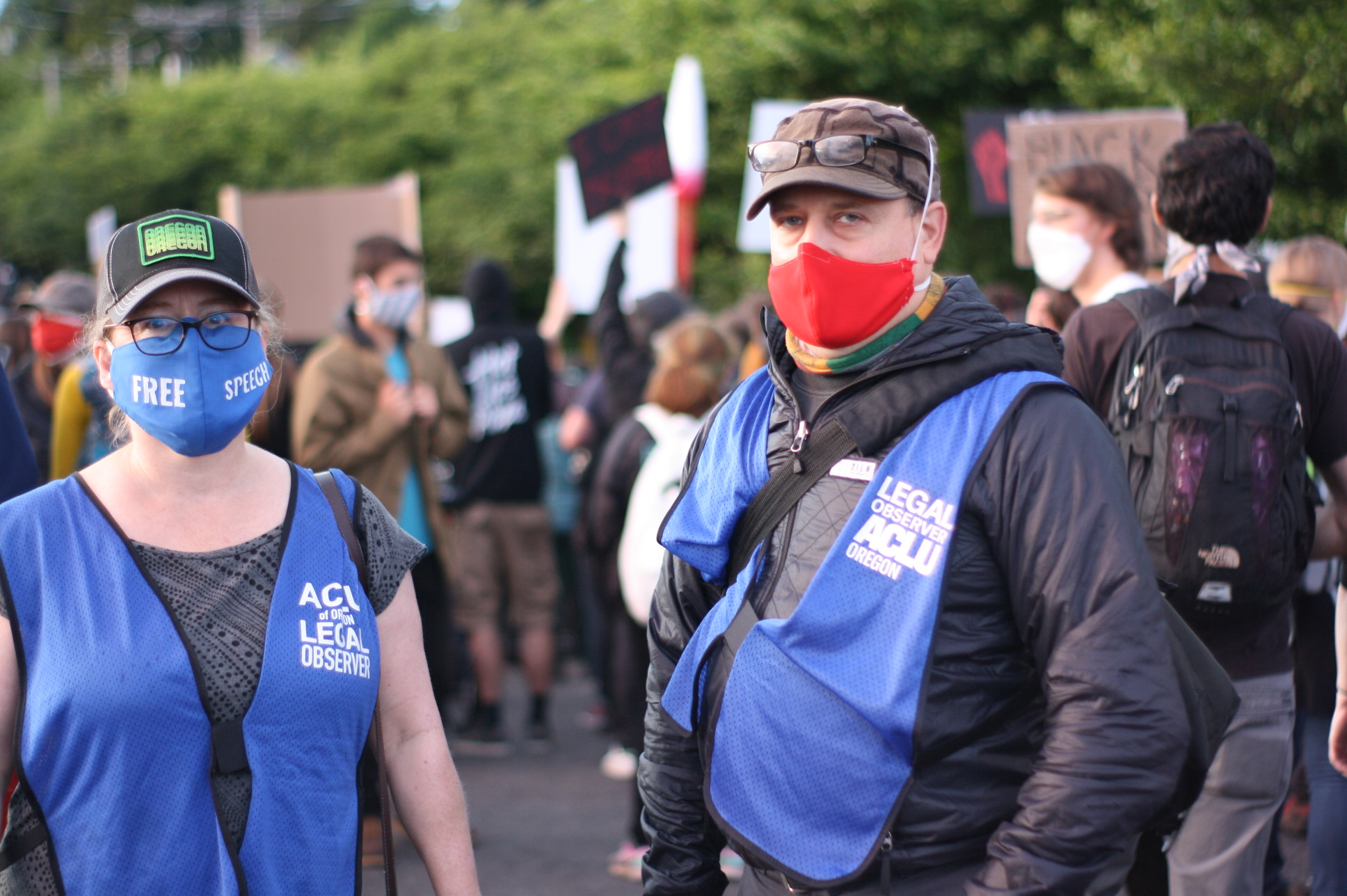
ACLU legal observers attended the march to Cleveland High School on June 13, 2020

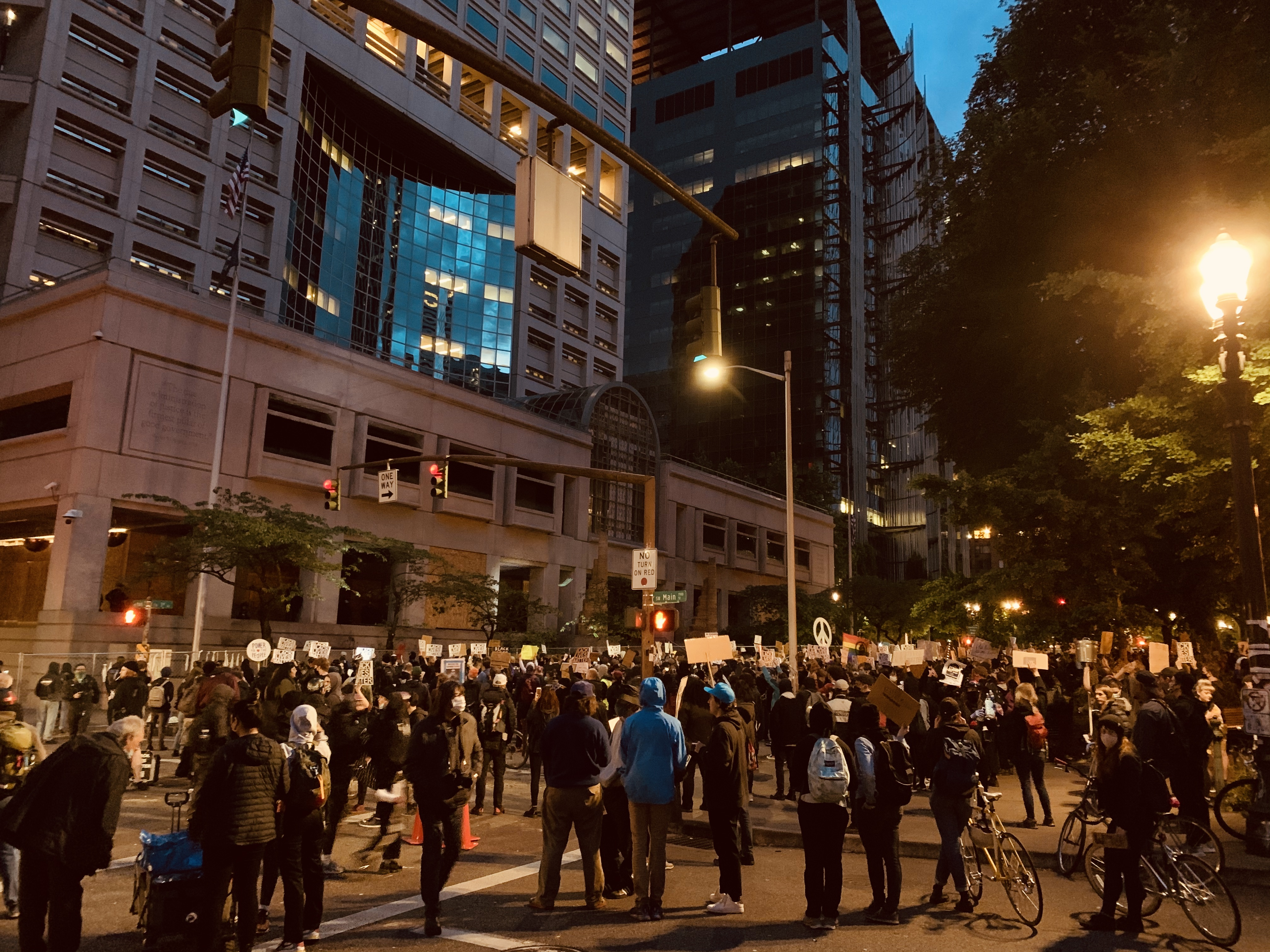
Protest at dusk outside the Multnomah County Justice Center on June 15

For the 17th day, protesters assembled in various parts of the Portland area on June 13. The main march, with at least 1,000 people, went from Revolution Hall, the starting point for most of the marches, and went to Cleveland High School, including a stretch of Southeast Division St. from 11th to 26th. The Clinton Street Theater displayed a quote from Malcolm X on its marquee as protesters marched past. N1789M, a Cessna 208 Caravan surveillance plane linked with the U.S. Marshals Service circled overhead for 3 hours.

About 1,000 demonstrators marched to Jefferson High School on June 14, the 18th day of protests.

At a second city budget vote on the issue, commissioners voted 3–1 to cut PPB funding by $15 million. This would terminate the Gun Violence Reduction Team and cut funding for school resource officers and transit police, while reallocating nearly $5 million to Portland Street Response, which would respond to calls concerning homeless people instead of police. Commissioner Chloe Eudaly again voted "no".

The group Care Not Cops, who wanted more money cut from PPB funding, later that day demonstrated outside of Wheeler's apartment in Northwest Portland. By midnight, they had been joined by hundreds of people, who began blocking off the streets at Northwest Glisan and 10th Avenue with impromptu. Just after 5:30 a.m. police cleared the scene; a police spokesman said there were only about 50 protesters left by that time. Wheeler helped in cleaning up the debris.

June 23 was the sentencing date for Jeremy Christian, who was convicted of murder and attempted murder for an attack in 2017. Three men, all of them white, attempted to stop Christian's attack on two black girls; Christian killed two of them and injured the third. In commemoration of that event, hundreds gathered at Powell Park on SE 26th and Powell for a demonstration and march focusing on white allies. They marched to Reed College, which one of the men killed had attended.

County officials removed a fence that had stood around the Justice Center for several weeks on June 26.

=== July ===
Officers from the U.S. Department of Homeland Security (DHS) were deployed following President Trump's executive order that sought to protect statues. Willamette Week reported that several federal law enforcement agencies were deployed to Portland on July 2, including the U.S. Marshals Service, the Federal Protective Service, U.S. Customs and Border Protection, and Homeland Security Investigations. DHS sent officers in tactical gear from "more than a half-dozen" federal agencies and departments from around the country. Portland Deputy Police Chief Chris Davis said his department had not requested federal assistance and that federal officers' presence would "complicate things" for the PPB.

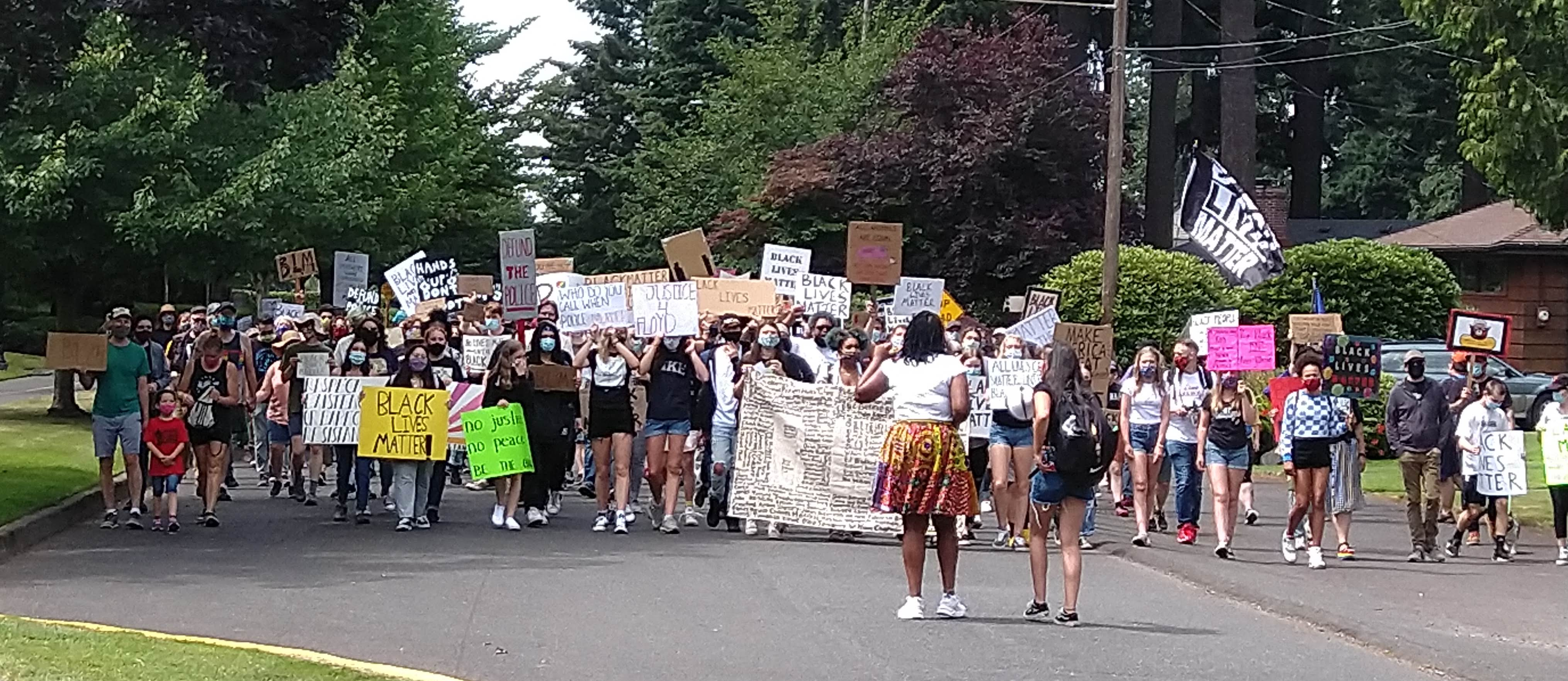
Demonstrators in Maywood Park on July 4, 2020

Multiple demonstrations took place in the city on July 4 including an "Anti-Independence Day" rally that began at Portland State University's Native American Student & Community Center, expressing indigenous support for Black Americans, followed by the "Bars Up Guns Down" motorcycle ride from Revolution Hall to the Justice Center and back in support of Black Lives Matter. That night, several hundred people gathered at Chapman Square and let off illegal aerial fireworks, some of which were aimed directly at the Justice Center, actions that were condemned by the PPB and the Multnomah County Sheriff's Office. Police twice declared a riot on the national holiday, first at 4 am and again after 11 pm. Protests continued on July 5 for the 39th consecutive day. Seven people faced federal charges for their activities at the Justice Center demonstrations over the July 4 weekend.

External videos
- Protester shot in head. From lawyer T. Greg Doucette, whose video collection was profiled in the LA Times.

On July 9, about 50 people marched in Lents Park and about 100 gathered downtown by the Justice Center. In the same neighborhood, a young Black woman, 18-year-old Shai-India Harris, was fatally shot, and the police did not immediately identify any suspects. A 19-year-old man who was in a relationship with Harris was charged in September with second-degree murder in her killing. A man from Texas was arrested for striking a Portland police officer three times with a hammer on July 10. On July 11, protester Donavan La Bella was shot in the head with a "less lethal" round by federal police, suffering facial and skull fractures and having to undergo facial reconstruction surgery. On July 14, a group marched from Kenton Park to the Portland Police Association building on Lombard street, where the crowd grew to more than 200 people. After demonstrators faced off with police officers, the police declared a riot.

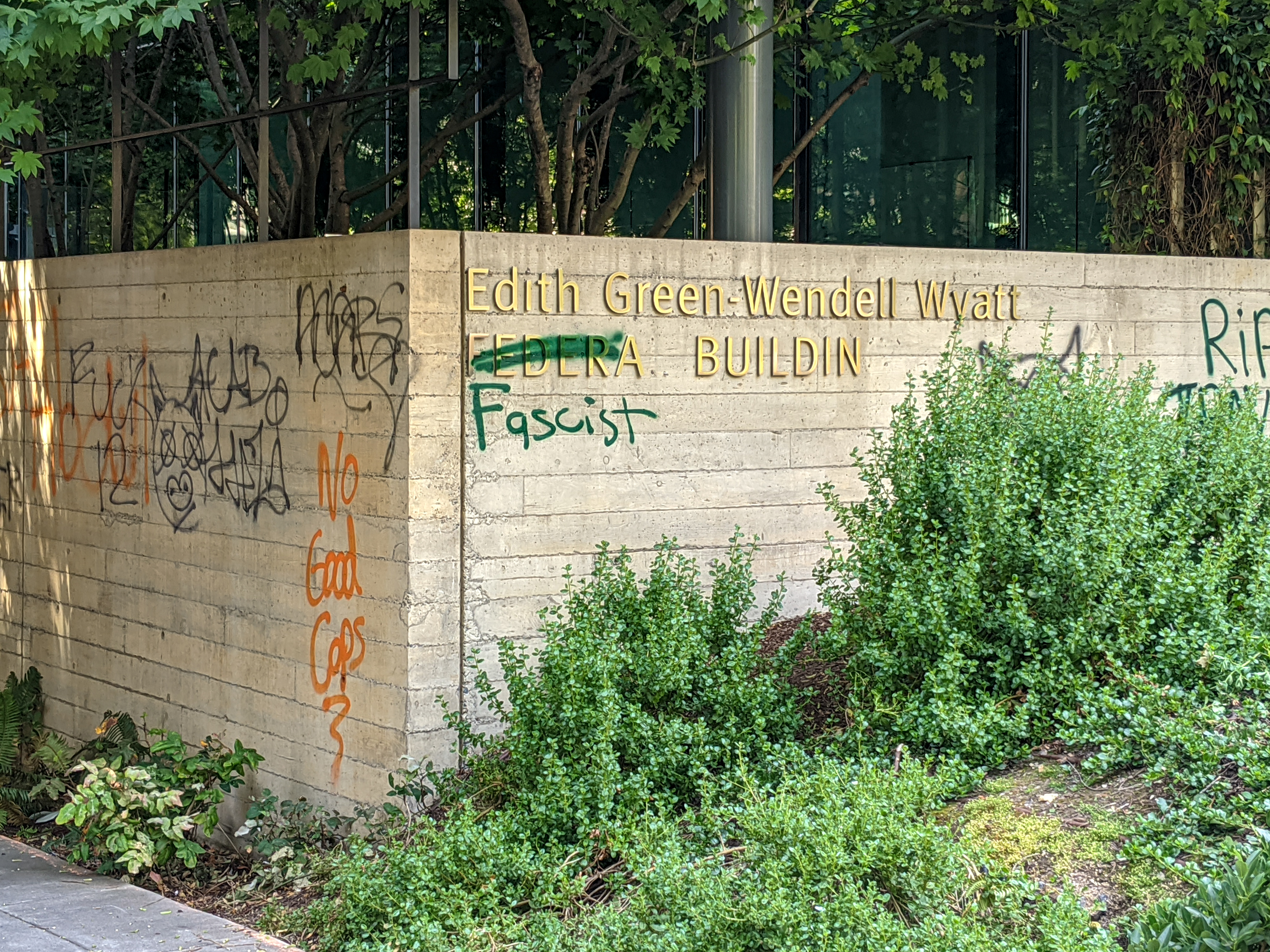
Graffiti outside Edith Green – Wendell Wyatt Federal Building, July 19, 2020

During the protests, tactical officers from the U.S. Marshals Special Operations Group and U.S. Customs and Border Protection's elite BORTAC unit were sent to Portland to protect federal property. Starting on or about July 14, however, federal agents in unmarked vehicles began arresting protesters who were not near federal property. Rose City Justice led a march of 200–250 people from Revolution Hall to Pioneer Courthouse Square on July 14, after having previously suspended its activities. On July 14, Mayor Wheeler called on Acting DHS Secretary Chad Wolf to remove federal agents from the city, accusing them of causing violence and using "life-threatening tactics" and saying "we do not need or want their help". The following day, four of Oregon's U.S. lawmakers issued a statement condemning the recent actions of federal law enforcement officials in Portland, who used tear gas and other aggressive techniques multiple times since July 10. U.S. Senators Ron Wyden and Jeff Merkley, and U.S. Representatives Suzanne Bonamici and Earl Blumenauer, accused the federal government of a "politically driven" response and of seeking "to target, attack, or silence those peacefully exercising their First Amendment rights". As of 15 July 2020, federal officers had arrested at least 19 people. Portland police closed the Plaza Blocks, a hub for protesters at the Justice Center, at 5:00 a.m. on July 16.

Starting the early morning of July 15, "rapid deployment teams" of federal agents from multiple agencies arrested protesters and forcefully took them in unmarked vans. Protesters accused the officers of being unidentified, but Customs and Border Protection later countered accusations by stating that officers were wearing CBP insignias. A story focusing on the search, detention, questioning, and brief incarceration of Mark Pettibone, a 29 year old protester, was first reported by Oregon Public Broadcasting and picked up the next day by national outlets, including a New York Times story authored by independent Portland journalist Sergio Olmos. Several witnesses reported seeing federal law enforcement officers in camouflage "emerge from unmarked vehicles, grab protesters without explanation, and drive off." Pettibone stated that he was "basically tossed" into an unmarked van and transported to a holding cell in the federal courthouse and later released without being charged. Similar incidents involving plainclothes officers of unknown agencies, occurred the following day. The failure of law enforcement officers to identify what agency they reported to was a tactic that drew comparisons to actions prior to the Donald Trump photo op at St. John's Church in Washington, D.C. several weeks prior. The actions by federal agents were condemned by the mayor, governor, members of Congress, and independent commentators. These arrests were reported in media as having rejuvenated the protests in Portland, resulting crowds numbering in the hundreds for the first time in several weeks, alongside drawing criticism from Wheeler, who was also the police commissioner who had been widely considered in favor of use of force by local police.

On July 18, according to police, protesters gathered at the PPB's North Precinct, taunting officers and vandalizing patrol vehicles; police also said that protesters broke into the Portland Police Association building and set it on fire. A police statement stated that officers extinguished the fire and declared the situation to be a riot, making seven arrests and deploying tear gas but not CS gas. Protesters made barricades out of fencing they removed from around the federal courthouse. Conflict resumed on the night of July 19. Hundreds of protesters, including what Portland police described as "dozens of people with shields, helmets, gas masks, umbrellas, bats, and hockey sticks," repeatedly advanced on the U.S. courthouse. At about 1:30 a.m. the following morning, protesters set a fire in the portico. Federal agents emerged from inside and deployed tear gas to repel the protesters. The Portland Police Department stated that although federal officers used tear gas, the city's officers were not involved in crowd control measures and did not fire tear gas.

External videos
- Assault on Chris David July 18, 2020

External videos
- Protester taken to unmarked van; video clip shared by international media outlets such as Newsweek and BBC.

At night on July 18, Navy veteran Chris David, wearing his Naval Academy gear, approached some of the federal agents to tell them "That oath of office is essentially swearing loyalty to the Constitution of the United States, and what they're doing is not constitutional anymore." As seen on video, David was standing still when one agent hit him forcefully five times with a baton; another agent sprayed David's face with what David said was pepper spray. As a result of the incident, David's hand was broken in two places. He required reconstructive surgery with pins and plates on his shattered ring finger and a bone in his hand was also broken. The officers were later identified as U.S. Marshals, and the Department of Justice inspector general was said to be investigating.

On that night, Portland mothers formed a human shield for the first time, a "Wall of Moms" to protect protesters from federal agents outside the federal courthouse. Federal agents in tactical gear fired tear gas canisters into the group of mothers. Around 1:45 a.m. on the 19th, when another group of unidentified armed federal agents advanced on a group of protesters, a woman wearing only a face mask and a stocking cap, later dubbed "Naked Athena" by reporters, confronted them. Despite the deployment of pepper balls and tear gas, she posed for the agents for about 15 minutes before they withdrew. Photographs of her action went viral.

On July 20, during the ninth week of daily protests, the "Wall of Moms" sang "Hands Up Please Don't Shoot Me" in a lullaby fashion while in Chapman Square. A "Wall of Dads" joined in and used leaf blowers to clear away tear gas and a "Wall of Vets" also joined in the demonstration for the first time. President Trump denounced the Wall of Moms as a "scam", tweeting: "The 'protesters' are actually anarchists who hate our Country. The line of innocent "mothers" were a scam that Lamestream refuses to acknowledge, just like they don't report the violence of these demonstrations!"

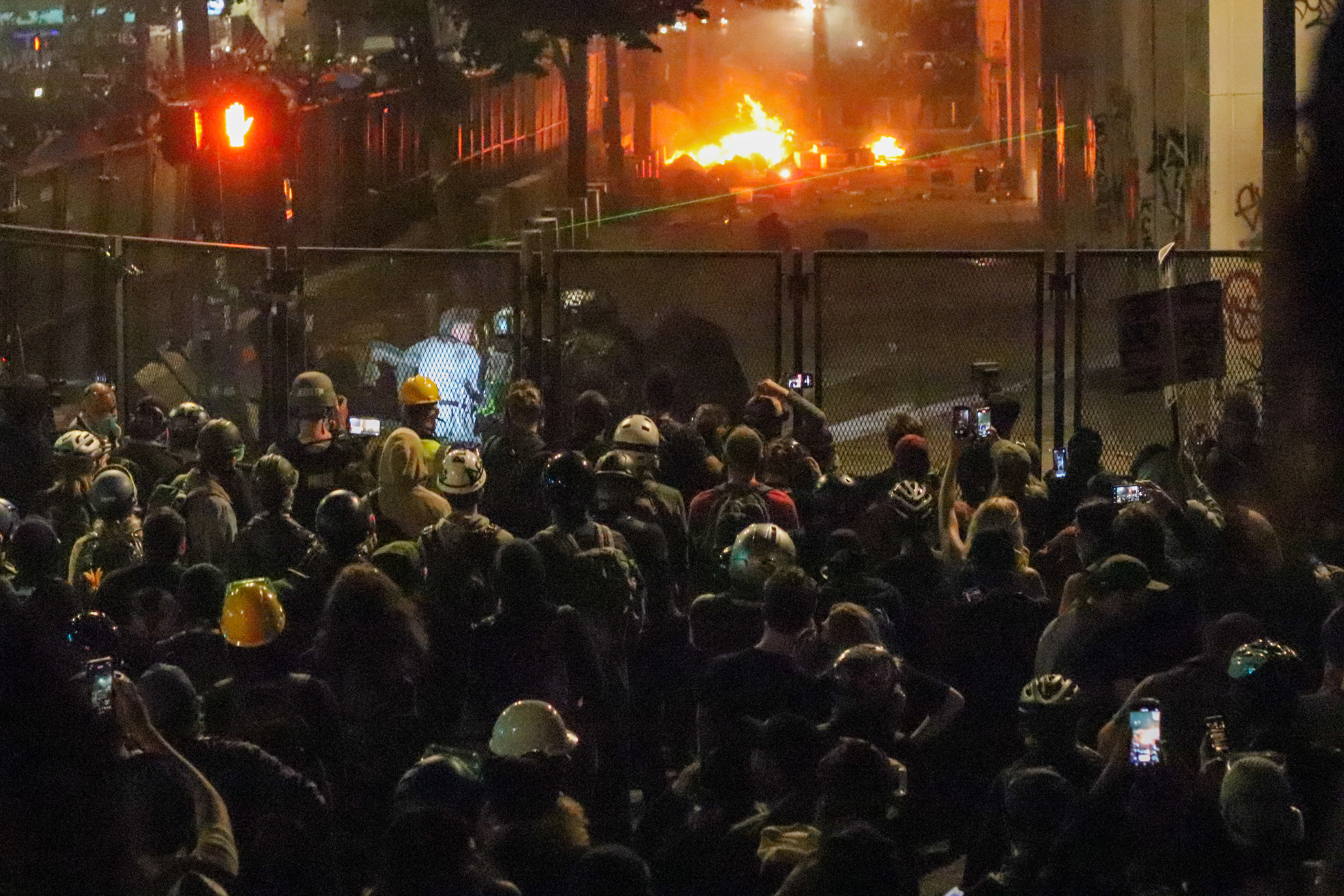
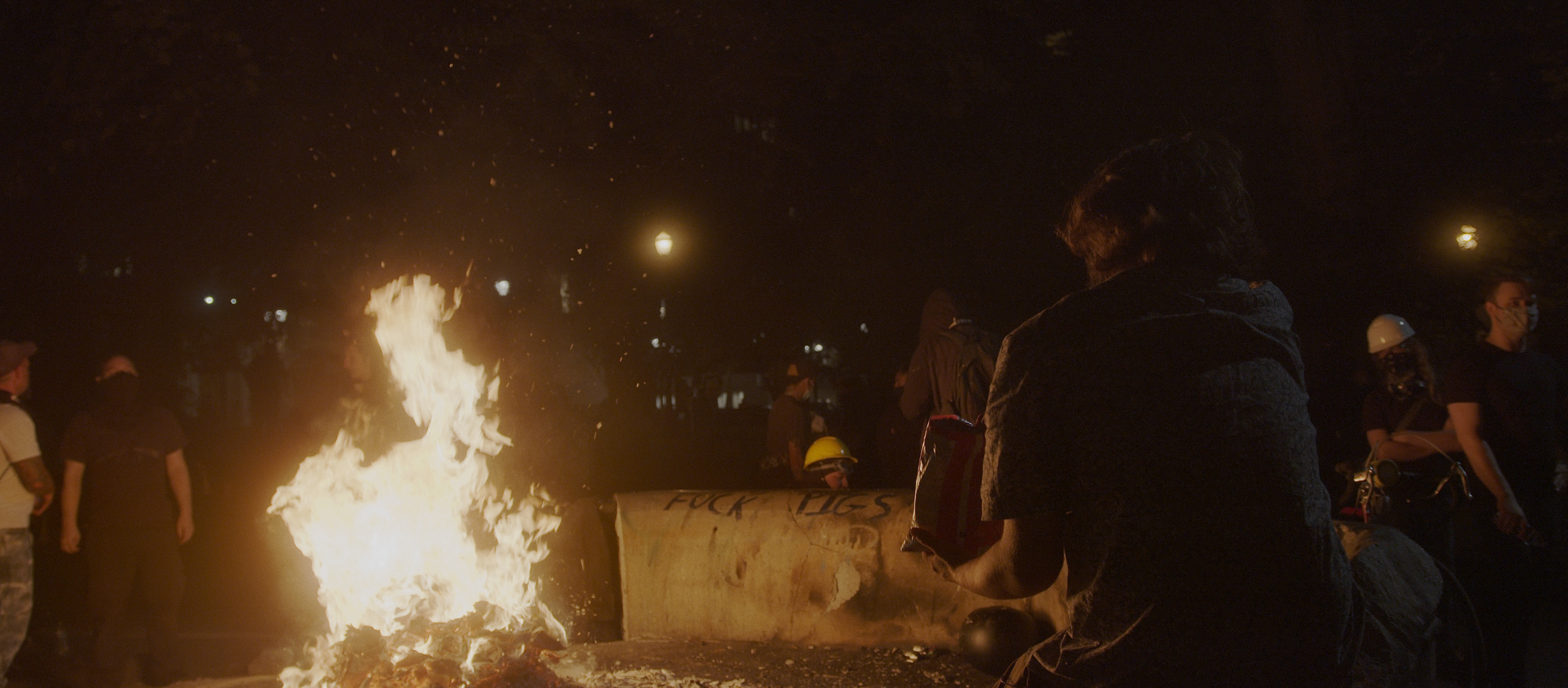
Fires and tear gas at the Mark O. Hatfield federal courthouse perimeter fence on July 22, 2020 (top); a bonfire in front of the courthouse on July 24, 2020 (bottom)

On July 22, mayor Wheeler attempted to address a crowd of protesters but was faced with boos and calls to resign. A riot was declared later in the night after police reported multiple flares and other incendiaries were thrown over the fence surrounding the federal courthouse, resulting in fires. Wheeler was teargassed along with protesters when federal agents deployed the munition into the crowd. Some protesters, noting the city's use of tear gas in response to protests earlier in summer 2020, reportedly "mocked" the mayor following his exposure.

On July 24, federal prosecutors unveiled charges against 18 protesters, five of whom were charged with suspicion of assaulting a federal officer, trespassing and creating a disturbance during protests on the night of July 20–21, eight were charged in connection with criminal conduct during the July 21–22 night protest–including one person charged with arson–and six were charged over events from the night of July 22–23, according to U.S. Attorney for the District of Oregon Billy Williams. According to the Justice Department, all had made an initial appearance in federal court and were released pending trial or other proceedings.

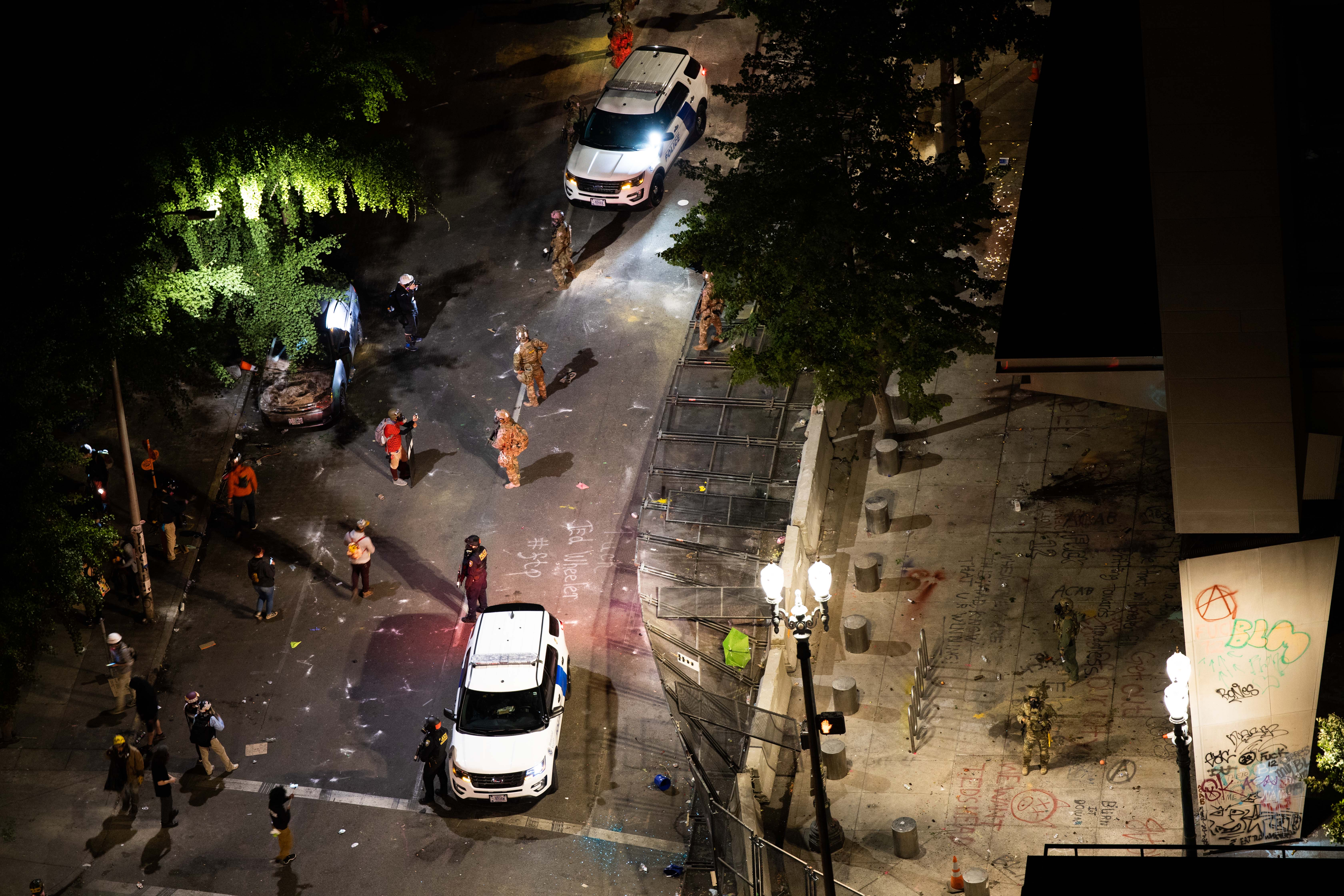
Aerial photo by U.S. Customs and Border Protection of the fence at the Justice Center after it had been knocked over

The same day, thousands of protesters began gathering in front of the federal courthouse's perimeter fence in the evening, with the crowd peaking at around 4,000 according to authorities. Many protesters danced and chanted "Black Lives Matter" and "Feds go home" to the sound of drums. At 10:15 p.m., a man tried to climb the fence and was quickly arrested. As the night went on, protesters shook the fence surrounding the courthouse and individuals in the crowd pointed green lasers at federal agents and threw flares, fireworks, glass bottles, and other solid objects at the building, prompting federal agents to respond with pepper balls, tear gas, and flash bangs on more than one occasion. According to DHS and Associated Press, power tools such as an angle grinder were also used to damage property, particularly the fence. Inside the courthouse, agents had most lights turned off reportedly to protect from people in the crowd who were firing metal ball bearings through the windows with sling shots. That same night, U.S. District Judge Michael Mosman denied a restraining order by the state attorney general to restrict the actions of federal police.

At around 2:30 a.m. on the morning of July 25, the Federal Protective Service declared the protest an unlawful assembly and began dispersing the crowd down Third Street with tear gas, pepper balls, and mass force. People scattered and small groups roamed the downtown as tear gas choked the air. According to authorities, six federal officers were injured during the overnight protest, with one suffering a concussion and another taken to the hospital for burns. One person was arrested for failing to comply with orders but was later released with no charges, bringing the total number of people arrested on or near the courthouse since early July to 60. In several cases, people who had been arrested had their release from jail conditioned on signing a document stating a variant of "Defendant may not attend any other protests, rallies, assemblies or public gathering in the state of Oregon" while the person's case is pending; more than one constitutional lawyer has stated that conditioning release on such agreement is a violation of the freedom of assembly clause of the First Amendment.

On July 25, a man was stabbed in downtown Portland, and a suspect was taken into custody on the same day. According to The Oregonian, the victim was a vocal Black supporter of Trump who was videographing the protests and had been trailed by a group of people. On July 28, federal prosecutors alleged that an incendiary device was thrown into the portico of the federal courthouse, causing a fire near the entrance, which led to the arrest and charges being brought against an 18-year-old protester.

Under a deal worked out between Governor Kate Brown and the Trump administration, federal agents withdrew to standby locations on July 30, while state and local law enforcement forces took over responsibility for protecting the courthouse; they made no arrests and mostly stayed out of sight. Protests that night were largely peaceful. A DHS spokesperson said federal officers would remain in the area at least until August 3.

Protests on the night of July 31–the 64th night of protests–were largely peaceful and no arrests were made. However, video emerged apparently showing a group of Portland protesters using an American flag and a Bible to kindle a bonfire outside the federal courthouse shortly after midnight; according to KOIN 6, the fire was subsequently put out by members of Moms United for Black Lives Matter. Protesters started another bonfire using plywood shortly after, but the crowd dwindled to around 100 at 2:00 a.m. before largely dispersing by 2:30 a.m. The Bible burning video went viral and sparked condemnation online, including from the president's son, Donald Trump Jr.

=== August ===
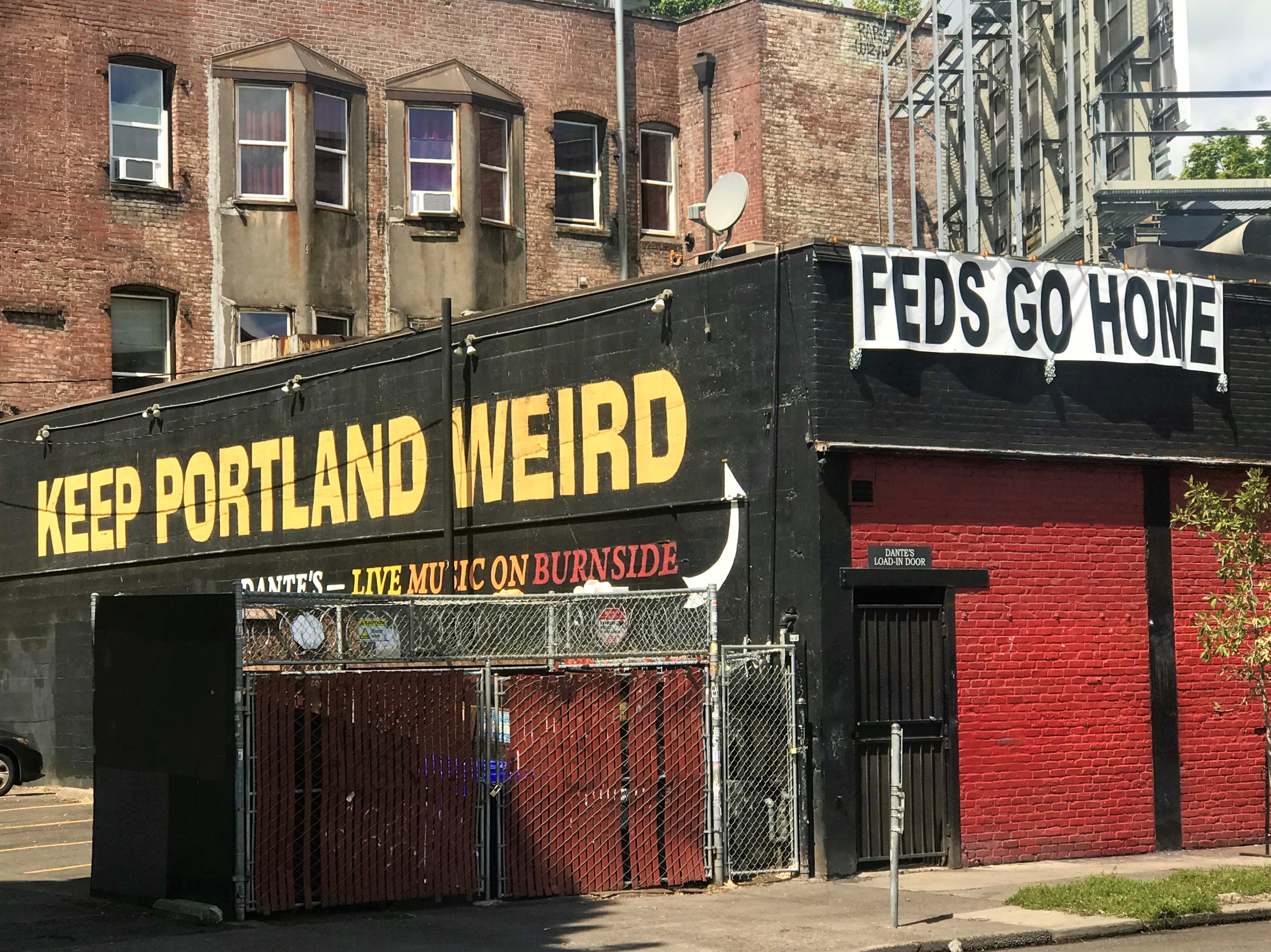
A "Feds Go Home" sign in August 2020

Despite a brief reprieve following the pullback of federal agents in late July-early August, tensions between protesters and police–including Portland police, local sheriff's deputies, and Oregon State Police troopers–continued to manifest, though demonstration sizes were noticeably smaller.

On August 5, violent clashes occurred in a residential neighborhood at a police precinct station. Tear gas was used. Captain Tony Passadore, the incident commander, sought to distance the violent rally from the greater George Floyd protests, saying "I don't want people to get confused to think that this was something related to Black Lives Matter ... I've been the incident commander for 24 nights of the 70-plus events, and I've seen amazing protesting going on in the city of Portland where people gather together."

On August 6, Mayor Ted Wheeler denounced demonstrators clashing with police, saying, "You are not demonstrating, you are attempting to commit murder," along with predicting there would be "more attacks on public buildings". That night, police deployed smoke grenades and used mass force to disperse a crowd of about 200 protesters near the precinct station after declaring an unlawful assembly. The Pacific Northwest Youth Liberation Front advertised the rallies on August 5 and 6 with the slogan: "No cops. No prisons. Total abolition." Media images showed an elderly woman with a fire extinguisher trying to prevent protesters from starting a fire at the station, but was blocked by a black-clad protester. Officers arrested 12 adults and detained one minor. Police reportedly did not use tear gas this night.

Roads near the precinct were closed later in the morning of August 7. Portland police tweeted "Any persons including members of the press who violate this order will be subject to arrest". Mayor Wheeler deplored violent protesters as political "props" for President Donald Trump's 2020 re-election campaign, saying that by partaking in violence, they were reinforcing Trump's messaging that "sick and dangerous anarchists" were fomenting chaos in Portland.

On August 8, peaceful demonstrations were held in Northeast and Southeast Portland, including a rally in Peninsula Park and a march organized at Laurelhurst Park. Hundreds of people gathered at Waterfront Park to hear activist and worship pastor Sean Feucht speak at the "Riots to Revival" event, where he sought to "flip the script" on recent unrest.

Around 10:00 p.m., Moms United for Black Lives Matter, which evolved from Wall of Moms, led hundreds of marchers northwest from Peninsula Park to the Portland Police Association (PPA) police union headquarters on North Lombard Street. The nighttime protest became increasingly rowdy as protesters barricaded the street with chain link fences and, according to police, "pushed dumpsters into the street to block traffic, set a dumpster on fire, vandalized the PPA office with spray paint, and destroyed security cameras". At 11:35 p.m., a small group broke into the offices and lit a fire. Police declared an unlawful assembly at 11:38 p.m. before declaring a riot minutes later, in which protesters, media and legal observers were ordered to disperse. According to police, the crowd began shining green lasers and throwing bottles and paint balloons, injuring three officers, before police bypassed the barricade and began making arrests and pushing the crowd of about 300 people back, including using smoke munitions and flash bangs, but no tear gas. "Officers moved the crowd so the fire could be extinguished before it could grow out of control," said Portland police. At 1:19 a.m., Portland Police declared a riot at Kenton Park, declared the park closed, and urged the crowd to leave. The majority of the crowd left by 2:00 a.m., though police said arrests were made, including Demetria Hester, leader of Moms United for Black Lives.

On August 16, a man was beaten and left in the street unconscious near a Black Lives Matter protest in Portland. He had previously tried to intervene on behalf of a transgender woman who was being harassed, physically attacked, and robbed by a mob. Other people were also attacked by the mob. The man who allegedly rendered the victim unconscious with a kick to the head was identified as Marquise Love and was subsequently wanted by police. A 32-minute video shows the episode with the kick to the head occurring near the end of the video. Love turned himself in on August 21 and was charged with three felonies.

On August 22 at around noon, right-wing and pro-law enforcement groups held a "Trump 2020 Cruise Rally" at the Multnomah County Justice Center that was quickly met with counter-protesters. According to The Oregonian, the right-wing groups included Proud Boys and supporters of president Donald Trump with some carrying rifles, body armor, helmets, and makeshift shields, while left-wing counter-protesters included regular BLM supporters and anti-fascist Popular Mobilization PDX and Democratic Socialists of America members. Fights and scuffles broke out between the dueling demonstrators with solid objects thrown and some protesters firing paintball guns and using baseball bats, smoke canisters, and pepper spray; one man was seen pointing a revolver at the counter-protesters. Streets were blocked and media images showed hundreds of people were involved. Portland police warned via loudspeaker that arrests could be made but, according to a press release, they refused to physically intervene or declare a riot citing a shortage of manpower following previous nightly protests–there were only 30 officers available to manage the crowd–and because the skirmishes were brief and those involved were "willingly" engaged; there were no reports of arrests during the violence. The right-wing groups largely retreated from downtown by 2:30 p.m. and an unlawful assembly was declared at 2:50 p.m.; the counter-protesters returned to Terry Schrunk Plaza, though the plaza was cleared and arrests were made after another unlawful assembly was declared by federal officials. Federal buildings had been closed that weekend due to a bomb threat. A right-wing protester broke journalist Robert Evans' hand with a baton while Evans was filming. On August 24, Mayor Ted Wheeler, who also serves as Portland's police commissioner, said the decision for police to not intervene in the street violence was under review.

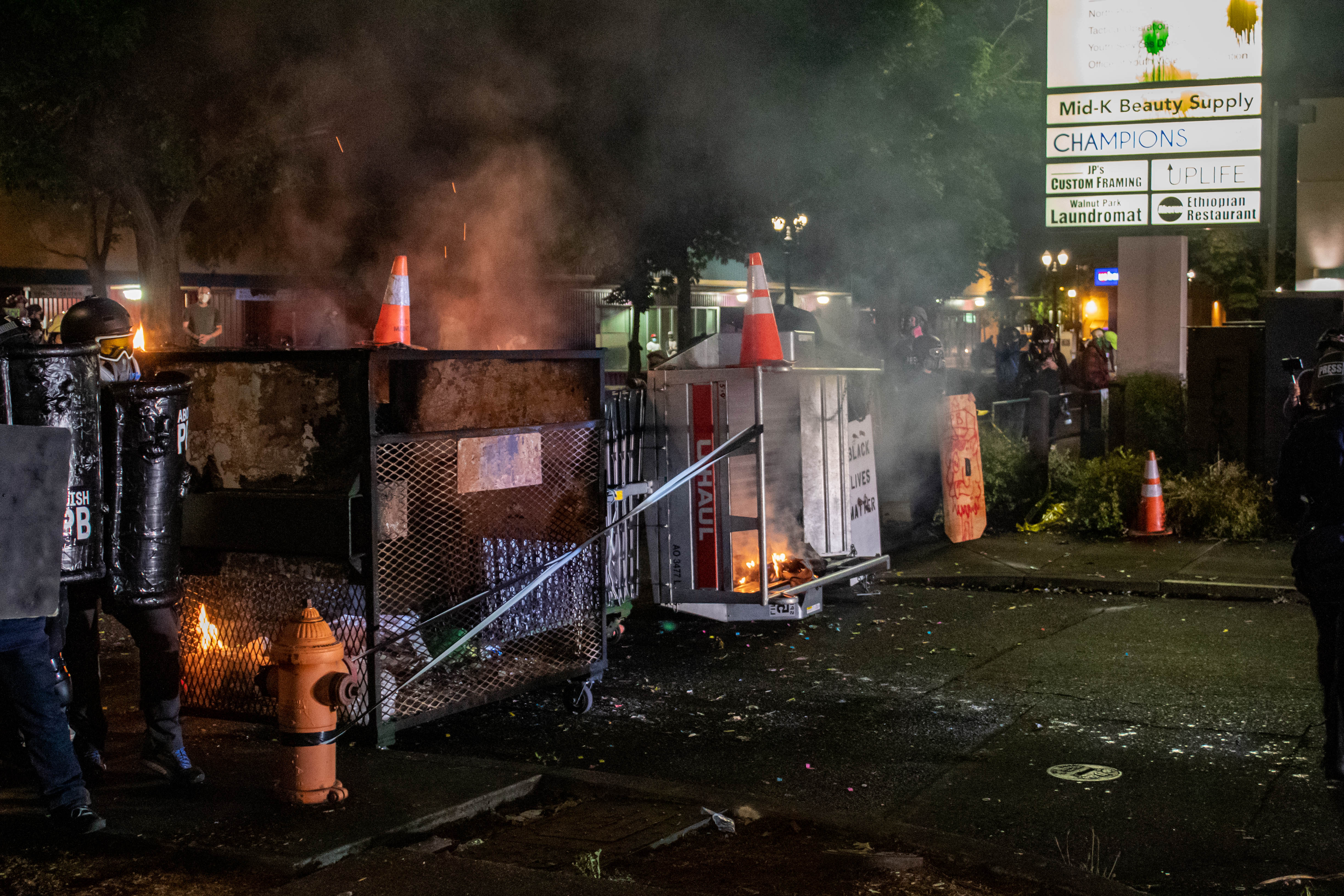
Protesters with shields and barricades during the north precinct riot on August 23, 2020

On August 23, BLM protesters marched from a park to the north police precinct while, among other things, chanting "Jacob Blake"–the name of a black man that was shot by police in Kenosha, Wisconsin on the same day. That night, a riot was declared and police deployed tear gas after protesters shot paintball guns, threw rocks and glass bottles, pointed lasers at officers and a police support plane, and set the precinct building on fire. Numerous officers reported seeing individuals with apparent "press" identification also throwing rocks at them.

On the night of August 24, a riot was declared after about 300 people marched from Arbor Lodge Park to the PPA police union building. According to police, upon arrival, protesters sprayed graffiti, cut the power, and set fires inside and outside of the building; one person climbed on the roof and unfurled a banner. Dozens of police arrived shortly after and quickly extinguished the fires before surrounding the building, deploying tear gas, and making arrests. Around 100 protesters remained in the area and threw objects and shined lasers while police removed barricades blocking the street. Police briefly departed but returned after another fire was set inside the building and an awning was set ablaze. A total of 25 people were arrested before police again departed while deploying a final round of tear gas. Police said some of those arrested had weapons, including knives, a baton, and a dagger, and that individuals with "press" insignia on their clothing had disobeyed dispersal orders and thrown rocks at officers and damaged the windshield of a police vehicle; one person was detained after failing to produce press credentials.

On August 25 – the three-month anniversary of the murder of George Floyd and the 90th consecutive day of the protests – hundreds of protesters gathered at Shemanski Park in the South Park Blocks, blocks from the Justice Center, after a change of venue to not intervene with the weekly "Kid-Centered March for Black Lives", a peaceful organized march consisting of mostly children and their parents. After 9:00 p.m., the protesters at Shemanski Park marched to city hall and held a rally. According to police, within 15 minutes of arriving, some in the crowd had sprayed graffiti and broken at least three doors and a door switch; several protesters eventually entered city hall and smashed a surveillance camera and other "security features". Police declared an unlawful assembly and forced the crowd away from the building while making arrests, prompting protesters to spend the next hour marching through downtown before reconvening at city hall. Police subsequently declared a riot and again dispersed the crowd after officers were hit with items including eggs and bottles, lasers were pointed at an officer's face, a glass bus stop shelter was shattered, city hall windows were smashed, and a man reportedly ignited an aerosol can.

Citing safety concerns for security guards, police had converged on city hall by midnight and made more arrests and dispersals. A total of 23 adults were arrested and two youths were detained throughout the night, the third consecutive night that over 20 demonstrators were arrested. Charges and allegations included disorderly conduct, interfering with a peace officer, assaulting a public safety officer, trespassing, resisting arrest, burglary, and unlawful directing of light from a laser pointer.

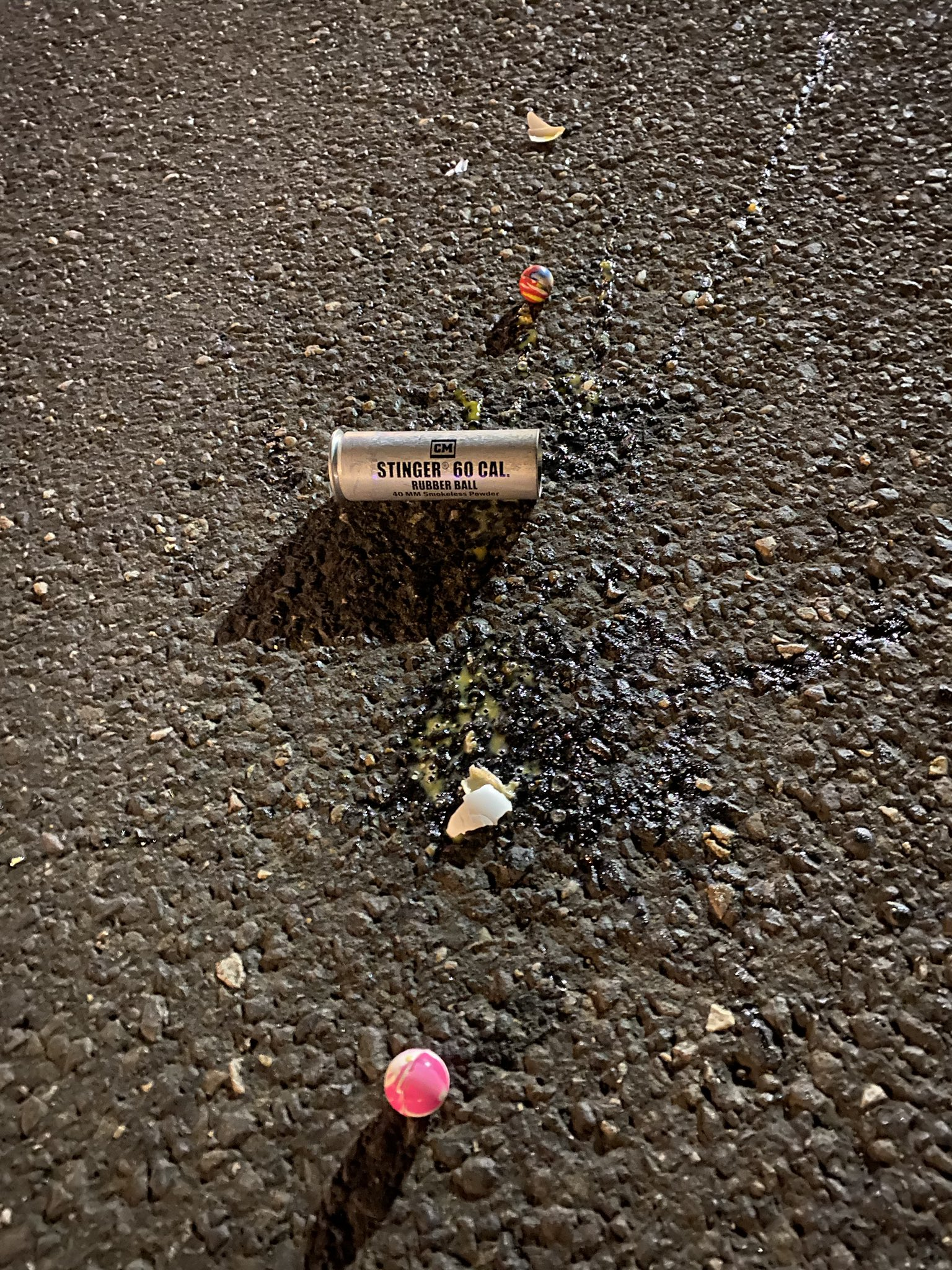
A Safariland Stinger round shot at protesters during the South Waterfront ICE protest on August 26, 2020

On the evening of August 26, in South Waterfront, a "couple hundred" people gathered at Caruthers Park and marched to the U.S. Immigration and Customs Enforcement (ICE) building where it was vandalized. A New York Times correspondent said that by 10:15 p.m. federal officers, including Federal Protective Service and other DHS personnel, were standing off against protesters. Police declared an unlawful assembly around 11:00 p.m. after some in the crowd threw bottles, eggs, and rocks at federal officers, one of whom was injured. Federal officers dispersed the crowd using mass force, tear gas, and impact munitions but local Portland police did not do so, according to a press release. 11 arrests were made.

On August 28, around 7:00 p.m., about a dozen protesters occupied the lobby of Mayor Ted Wheeler's Pearl District condominium, demanding he reduce the Portland Police Bureau (PPB) budget and resign as mayor and police commissioner, among other requests. Wheeler never emerged and it was unclear if he was at the residence or not. By 10:00 p.m., the group had departed the lobby but a larger demonstration of around 150 people was held in the street outside the condo, with live performances and dancing. Around 11:45 p.m., at Peninsula Park, a civil rights vigil transformed into at least 150 people marching to the boarded-up PPA police union building, in which demonstrators set two dumpsters on fire and barricaded roads. Around 12:40 a.m., police declared a riot and dispersed the crowd after the building's plywood-covered entrance was set on fire. According to police, 19 arrests were made and more than half of those arrested lived outside of Portland.

Around 10:00 p.m. on August 31, Mayor Ted Wheeler's birthday, protesters marched from the North Park Blocks and gathered outside his condo to again demand his resignation. Demonstrators presented the protest as a birthday celebration, with some wearing party hats, chanting, dancing to music, and, according to police, launching "illegal commercial-grade" fireworks over the building. After initially observing the demonstration, police subsequently declared a riot around 11:00 p.m. after protesters had set fires in the street, smashed windows, burglarized a business, and a person threw a burning object into an occupied apartment building. According to police, protesters threw rocks and paint balloons at officers and set another dumpster on fire before they were pushed out of the area. Police said they used "crowd control munitions" but not CS gas to disperse the crowd; 19 protesters were arrested, mainly for disorderly conduct and interfering with a peace officer. Police began a search for the person that threw the burning object into the residential building.

==== Killing of Aaron Danielson ====
On August 29, clashes erupted between supporters of President Trump and Black Lives Matter protesters. Hundreds of Trump supporters took part in the "Trump 2020 Cruise Rally", a caravan of more than 100 cars and trucks displaying pro-Trump flags and signs, which drove through Portland, some of them using paintball guns and pepper spray on counter-protesters. The rally was set up by Belarusian and Ukrainian immigrants residing in Idaho who used an assumed name to organize the activities on Facebook and other social media.

A participant in that caravan, a supporter of the right-wing group Patriot Prayer, was shot and killed. The victim was identified as Aaron Danielson, initially referred to by his alias "Jay" by Patriot Prayer founder Joey Gibson. Portland police issued an arrest warrant for Michael Reinoehl, a self-declared anti-fascist and supporter of antifa, who had regularly attended past protests in Portland and said he had provided "security" for the protests. He had been arrested in July for carrying a handgun, and had been shot in the arm while attempting to wrestle a gun away from a right-wing protester. Reinoehl was later identified and killed by police in their attempts to apprehend him in Lacey, Washington on September 3. Prior to his death, Vice News broadcast freelance journalist Donovan Farley's interview with Reinoehl, in which Reinoehl claimed to have acted in self-defense because he feared he and a friend were about to be stabbed. However, no knife was found on Danielson. A document released shortly after he was shot by police indicates Reinoehl hid in a parking garage and followed Danielson. A memorial vigil for Danielson was held in Vancouver, Washington's Esther Short Park on September 5.

=== September ===
On September 5, the 100th consecutive day of protests, two simultaneous sit-ins took place on the city's east side and at 2:00 p.m. a pro-Black Lives Matter "PDX Car Caravan" rally began on the Portland Community College Cascade campus. Portland United for Justice and Equality held a nonviolent protest at Pioneer Courthouse Square from 6:00 p.m. to 9:00 p.m. while a vigil for black victims of police violence was held at Tom McCall Waterfront Park from 8:00 p.m. to 10:00 p.m.

Between 8 and 9 p.m., hundreds of protesters were gathering at Ventura Park in preparation for a march despite announcements by police that a march was not permitted. The group began marching down Stark Street towards the PPB east precinct but were confronted by a line of riot police blocking their path. During the stand-off, someone in the crowd threw what authorities described as a molotov cocktail towards the police line–setting a protester's feet on fire in the process–after which a riot was declared; the injured man was later taken to the hospital in a private car, officials stated. Police began dispersing the crowd from the stand-off area using tear gas, pepper balls, and other munitions while making multiple arrests. According to authorities, rioters in Ventura Park used slingshots and threw rocks, fireworks, and other projectiles at officers, prompting arrests, with two of those arrested wearing body armor. Dumpsters, wooden pallets, and garbage cans were set on fire as groups of rioters "meandered" in the Mill Park area for four more hours before street activities died down. Overall, PPB arrested 43 people and the Oregon State Police arrested 16 with charges ranging from disorderly conduct to arson. Some police, including a sergeant, sustained injuries during the riots and an OSP vehicle was damaged by rocks.

On September 10, Mayor Wheeler banned city police from deploying CS gas, the commonly used form of tear gas, for crowd control, while nevertheless urging cops to respond forcefully to violence. The city-level ban did not apply to federal officers.

On September 15, a 36-year-old man was indicted by a grand jury after he had allegedly shined a blue laser directly into the eyes of police officers "on multiple occasions" during demonstrations in downtown Portland on August 25. He was charged with second degree assault, unlawful use of a weapon, and two counts of unlawful directing of light from a laser pointer.

On September 16, KOIN reported that "Portland's protest streak has ended, with demonstrations becoming scarcer and less confrontational", and stated that poor air quality from nearby wildfires "caused the nightly demonstrations to subside shortly after passing the 100 night milestone." The wildfire hiatus ended the 104-day streak of daily protests, causing them to subside by September 9. However, as air quality improved, organized protests resumed with the PNW Youth Liberation Front announcing new demonstrations for September 18 targeting the Immigration and Customs Enforcement facility near South Waterfront.

On September 18, hundreds of protesters descended on the South Portland ICE building around 9:00 p.m. where armed federal officers in armor were seen waiting behind the building's gate. At 9:45 p.m., Portland police arrived and announced an unlawful assembly via LRAD as the protest had blocked streets near South Bancroft Street and South Moody Avenue. As the crowd grew unruly and objects were thrown, federal officers, including Federal Protective Service and ICE Enforcement and Removal Operations (ERO) personnel, began dispersing the crowd down the street using tear gas, smoke bombs, and impact munitions, while PPB flanked and made arrests; some protesters were seen using umbrellas as a shield wall according to images and footage captured by independent reporters and journalists. At least 11 arrests were made. PPB initially tweeted tear gas among the list of crowd control munitions they could use on the crowd, despite its use being banned by the mayor eight days prior. PPB Sgt. Kevin Allen said they were legally required to make that warning despite not using the agent, and Mayor Wheeler confirmed on September 19 that no tear gas was deployed by city police despite its use by federal personnel.

On September 23, 13 people were arrested at another protest. Multnomah County District Attorney's office were pursuing felony charges for riot and possession of a destructive device against a 23-year-old male transient who was a convicted assailant from Georgia. A probable cause affidavit said a police officer saw the transient lighting a petrol bomb.

=== December ===
On December 31, a protest beginning near PPB headquarters was declared to be a riot shortly before midnight. Police advanced on protesters, which resulted in fireworks being used by protesters and an eventual confrontation involving non-lethal weapons. Police were backed up by federal Department of Homeland Security forces in response to projectiles allegedly thrown at police. In the early hours of January 1, Portland police ordered all persons in the area to leave immediately. Authorities did not disclose the number of protesters arrested.

=== 2021 ===
In April 2021, the New York Times reported that, in contrast to other places where protests had petered out, it had been "almost a year of near-continuous protests since the police killing of George Floyd in Minneapolis", although crowd sizes had waned. Vandalism and property destruction was an ongoing problem, with the deputy police chief estimating that about 150 to 200 people were prone to engage in property destruction, although many demonstrations were smaller than that. This group has been described as a mix of anarchists and police abolitionists. Their actions were criticized by some activists, and city officials promised a crackdown. Mayor Wheeler extended the city's state of emergency on April 23, 2021, as some debated whether the protests had been subject to co-optation by other groups or movements. Activists after the Chauvin trial ended sought to keep efforts focussed on issues of police accountability, as unrest continued in early May 2021. The Floyd family thanked demonstrators in Portland for continuing to protest for police accountability, after the Chauvin murder trial concluded.

In May 2021 the United States Department of Justice sent a letter to the Portland Chief of Police and City Attorney criticizing the Portland Police Bureau's use of force during the protests. Rolling Stone described the letter as a "scathing" report of actions described as unconstitutional and contrary to the PPB's own policies.

On May 25, 2021, the first anniversary of Floyd's murder, a crowd of hundreds protested outside the Multnomah County Justice Center, with some demonstrators vandalizing the building with graffiti and others chanting for it to be burned down. They threw bottles, fireworks, and other objects at officers when warned that the gathering was an unlawful assembly, then continued downtown where they blocked traffic and vandalized businesses. Police declared the protest a riot at 10:00 pm, and at least five arrests were made.

== Vandalism ==
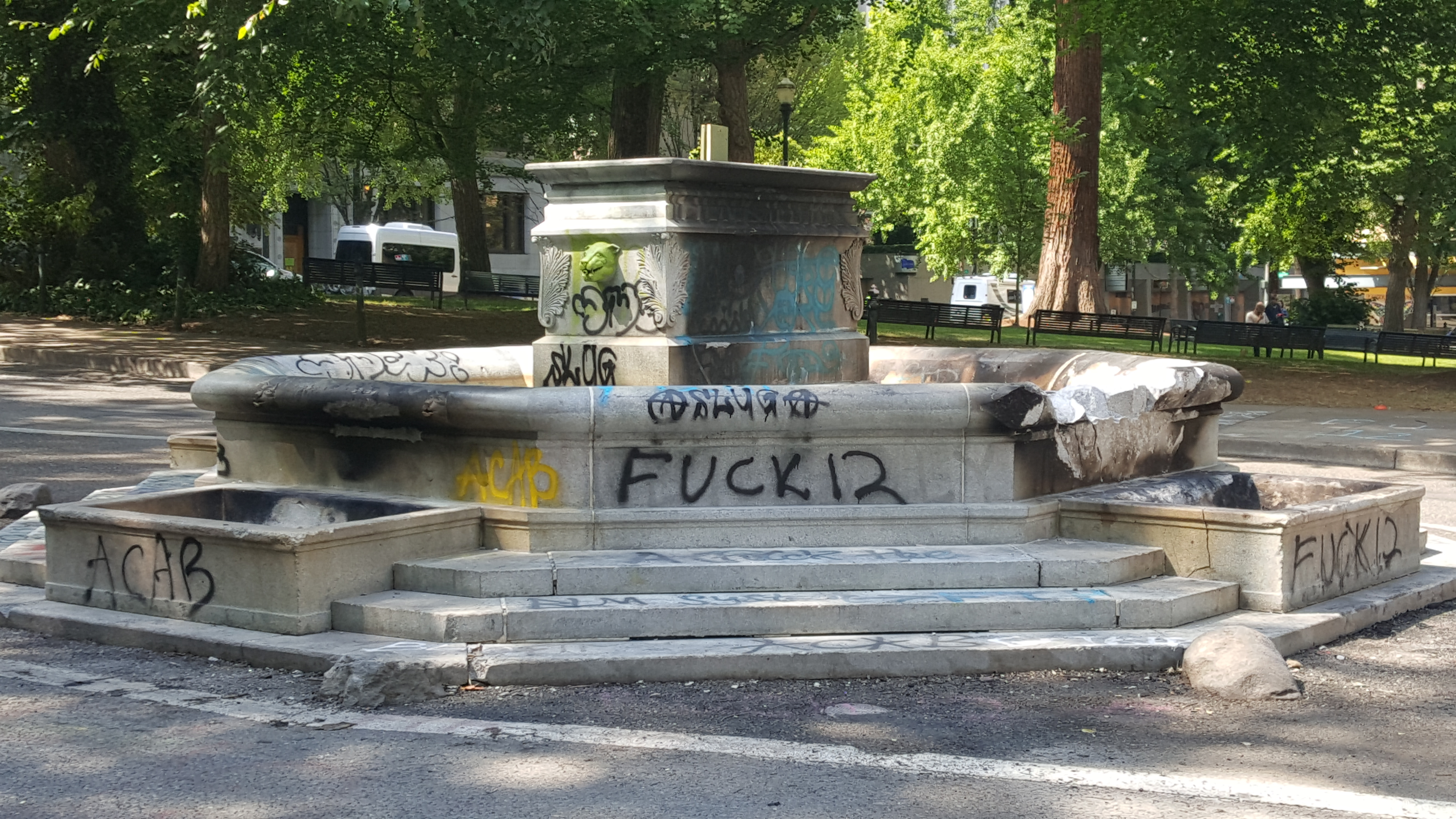
The vandalized Thompson Elk Fountain in Plaza Blocks after the elk statue was removed on July 2, 2020

In early June, businesses reported losses totaling millions of dollars as the result of vandalism and looting, and by mid-July damage was reported at $23 million, although upon further investigation found to be closer to $5 million. Local business owners of color launched the Portland Cleanup Project.

On June 14, a statue of Thomas Jefferson was toppled from its pedestal. Vandalism of the bronze statue of York prompted the University of Portland to remove the figure from the Captain William Clark Monument on June 17. A statue of the first U.S. president, George Washington, on Northeast Sandy Boulevard and 57th Avenue was toppled by demonstrators on June 18. On July 1–2, protesters set fire to the Thompson Elk Fountain in the Plaza Blocks that resulted in structural damage to the granite base; deemed a safety hazard by the Regional Arts & Culture Council, the city removed the unharmed elk on July 2, and later, the fountain. The Promised Land, also installed in the Plaza Blocks, was vandalized as well.

The Portland federal courthouse was also repeatedly vandalized over the weeks of protests in June and July.

== Responses ==
In Portland, the mayor determines which members of the City Council administer which bureau, and the mayor is typically the commissioner in charge of the Portland Police Bureau. Days before the protests began, incumbent mayor Ted Wheeler had fallen short of the 50% threshold that would have given him an outright win in the city's primary election for his second term. In November 2020, he faced Sarah Iannarone in a runoff election but was ultimately reelected.

During his term, his performance in the role of police commissioner was the source of significant criticism. The United States Department of Justice found the city to be in "substantial compliance" on 200 requirements set out in a 2012 settlement regarding the use of force on people with mental illness. However, protests throughout his term had highlighted the killing of numerous Portlanders, including some who appeared to be in mental distress.

=== Government ===
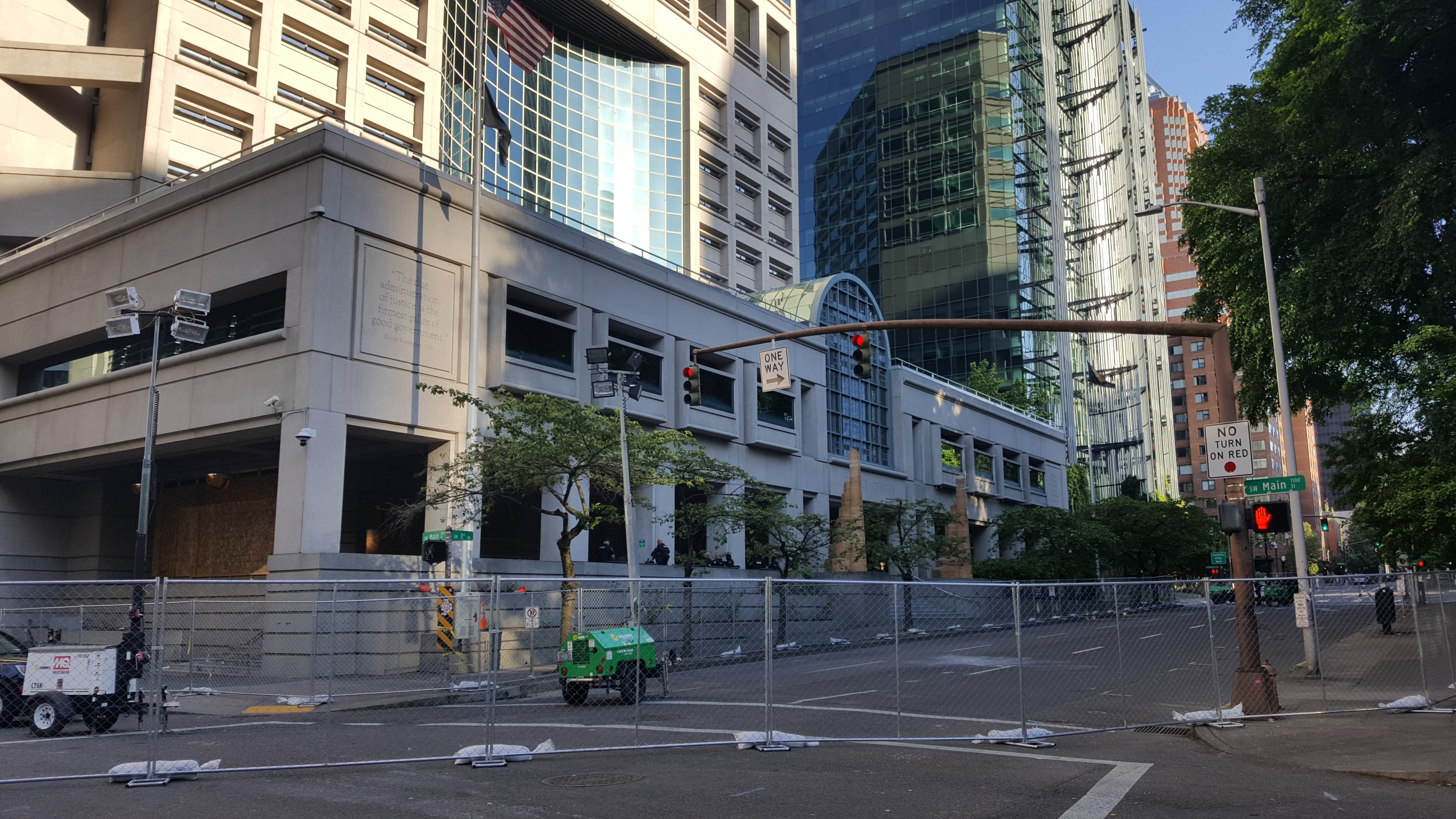
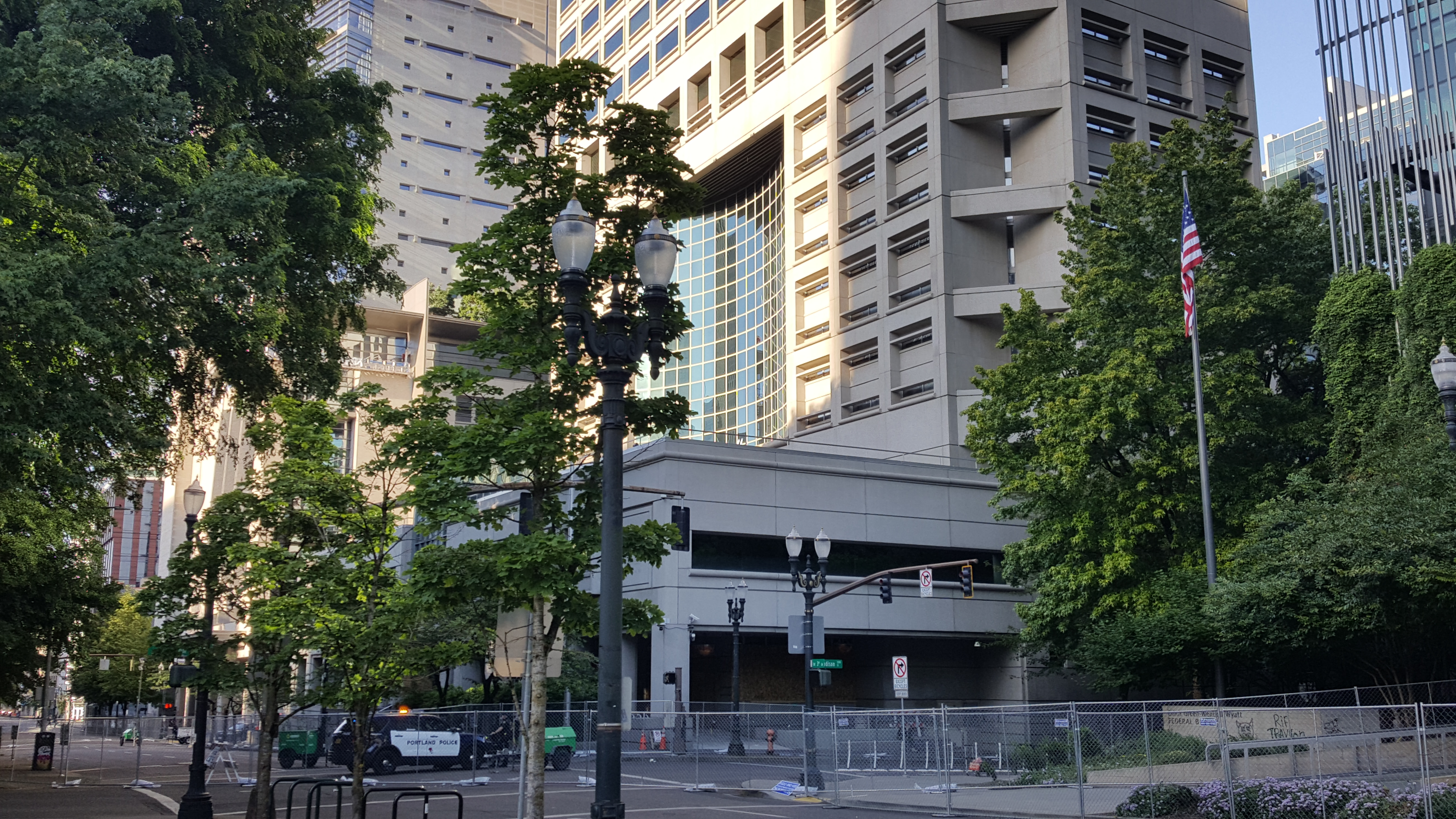
Barricades outside the Multnomah County Justice Center, June 3, 2020

Mayor Ted Wheeler tweeted, "Burning buildings with people inside, stealing from small and large businesses, threatening and harassing reporters. All in the middle of a pandemic where people have already lost everything. This isn't calling for meaningful change in our communities, this is disgusting." Sara Boone, chief of Portland Fire & Rescue, attributed the protests and violence to Floyd's murder and "a system that allows people of color to 'feel fear every day.'" The city implemented a curfew from 8pm on May 30 to 6am on May 31. On May 31, Wheeler extended the curfew for another night (8pm to 6am). He said the demonstration has been "co-opted by rioters and looters", and Jami Resch, chief of the Portland Police Bureau, called the rioters a "group of selfish individuals".

On May 30, TriMet paused bus and MAX Light Rail service to and from downtown and the Rose Quarter after the demonstrations started. The following day, the agency stopped bus, MAX, and Portland Streetcar service starting at 3:30 p.m., and said in a statement: "Our hearts at TriMet are heavy following the violence that damaged our city overnight, along with the emotions that are so raw here and across the nation. While TriMet appreciates the First Amendment right to protest, we hope that it is done without violence or vandalism." The Oregon Department of Transportation (ODOT) blocked the interchanges into the city along I-5, I-84, I-405, and U.S. Route 26. Willamette Week's Matthew Singer said ODOT's move was "without precedent in recent memory". E-scooter services (including Lime and Spin) were temporarily suspended in select parts of Northwest and Southwest Portland, the Central Eastside, and the Lloyd District.

On June 1, Gov. Kate Brown activated 50 National Guard and 100 state police troopers. Wheeler extended the same curfew for a third night. Billy J. Williams, United States Attorney for the District of Oregon, said at a press conference: "What I saw at the Justice Center ... was sickening. This has to stop and in order for that to happen in the city of Portland, we need help. We need bodies, we need more numbers to do something to stop this ridiculous violence. This just cannot keep up." The city's curfew was lifted on June 2. Elected officeholders (including Wheeler, Williams, Multnomah County District Attorney Rod Underhill, and Multnomah County Sheriff Mike Reese), law enforcement officials, and black demonstrators and community leaders met for the first time. The Hawthorne Bridge's west-bound lanes were closed for security purposes on the evening of June 2. Resch said:

I want to recognize the thousands of demonstrators who came downtown in a peaceful manner and exercised their First Amendment rights. There are many thousands of you who are not involved in the violence and destruction and I thank you. I still hear your message and I know the others who are engaging in criminal acts do not represent you.

The Oregon Convention Center's (OCC) spires were illuminated yellow as a "beacon of hope for our suffering and silenced communities of color". Metro, which operates the venue, said, "Our venues are located in areas with deep legacies of racial injustices and we support peaceful demonstrations to stand together to dismantle systemic racism and hatred." Additionally, the OCC's executive director said the venue "is an economic driver for our state and the spires have become as much of a staple in the skyline as the White Stag on Burnside. We will continue to shine bright in community solidarity, providing a beacon of hope for Oregonians."

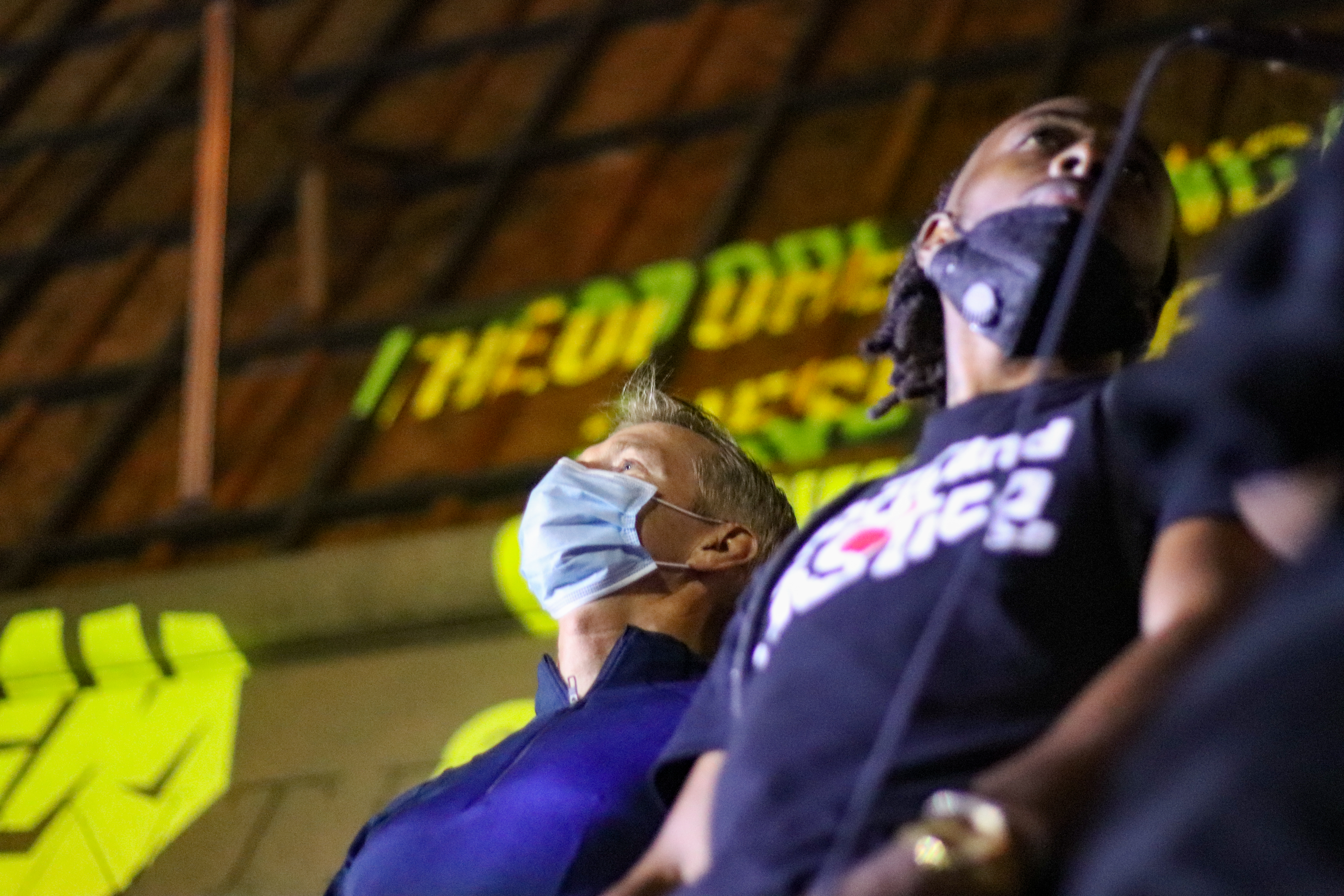
Mayor Ted Wheeler, with "THEODORE RESIGN" projected behind him, addressed a crowd of protesters on July 22, 2020.

On June 5, Wheeler pledged to "limit the ways police respond" by restricting use of sonic weapons and tear gas "if police had a viable alternative". He tweeted: "Effective immediately, I have directed @Portlandpolice to use LRAD only to share information and not as a sonic warning tone function."

On June 17, City Council reduced the police bureau's budget by about $16 million, or six percent.

On September 1, Wheeler denounced the riot that occurred on the night of August 31 outside of his residence as "senseless violence" and sent a letter to neighbors where he apologized and said he planned to move out. He had stated prior that he had no intentions to resign as mayor. On September 10, Wheeler banned the use of tear gas for riot control purposes, while affirming that police would continue to respond aggressively to violent protests and vandalism.

In October 2020, Commissioners Hardesty and Eudaly proposed cutting an additional $18 million from the coming year's police budget, including cutting the budget for the police Rapid Response Team and the Special Emergency Reaction Team. According to Hardesty, "It has become clear to me through research and seeing tactics used during the 100+ days of protesting that the Police Bureau utilizes antiquated methods of protest policing." The two commissioners will need a third vote on City Council to pass the change to the budget; Dan Ryan, elected in summer 2020, is reported to be considering it.

==== Federal ====
According to The Washington Post, White House officials had claimed that President Donald Trump became interested in federal operations against the protesters in Portland, seeing them as a means of underscoring his law-and-order message; an official added that "the White House had long wanted to amplify strife in cities," and "It was about getting viral online content." At the start of July, forces from the Department of Homeland Security (DHS), the U.S. Marshal Service, U.S. Customs and Border Protection (CBP), and the Federal Protection Service arrived in Portland, appearing at the U.S. courthouse, where they fired pepper spray or tear gas at protesters who got too close to the building. DHS refers to its deployment in Portland as Operation Diligent Valor.

The first federal arrest was recorded on July 2, and on July 10, protester Donavan La Bella suffered facial and skull fractures after being shot in the head by federal non-lethal rounds.

On July 13, President Trump praised federal authorities for their response to the Portland protests, saying they had done "a great job". Speaking at the White House, Trump said, "Portland was totally out of control, and they went in, and I guess we have many people right now in jail and we very much quelled it, and if it starts again, we'll quell it again very easily. It's not hard to do, if you know what you're doing." On July 16, Acting DHS Secretary Chad Wolf met with federal law enforcement officials in Portland after issuing a press release condemning "rampant, long-lasting violence" in Portland, including a timeline alleging violence by anarchists on Portland streets. Wolf said, "This siege can end if state and local officials decide to take appropriate action instead of refusing to enforce the law. DHS will not abdicate its solemn duty to protect federal facilities and those within them." On July 19, Trump tweeted:

We are trying to help Portland, not hurt it. Their leadership has, for months, lost control of the anarchists and agitators. They are missing in action. We must protect Federal property, AND OUR PEOPLE. These were not merely protesters, these are the real deal!

The Federal Aviation Administration banned drone operation from July 16 to August 16 in the airspace under 1,000 ft from within one nautical mile of the Edith Green-Wendell Wyatt federal court house at the request of Department of Homeland Security.

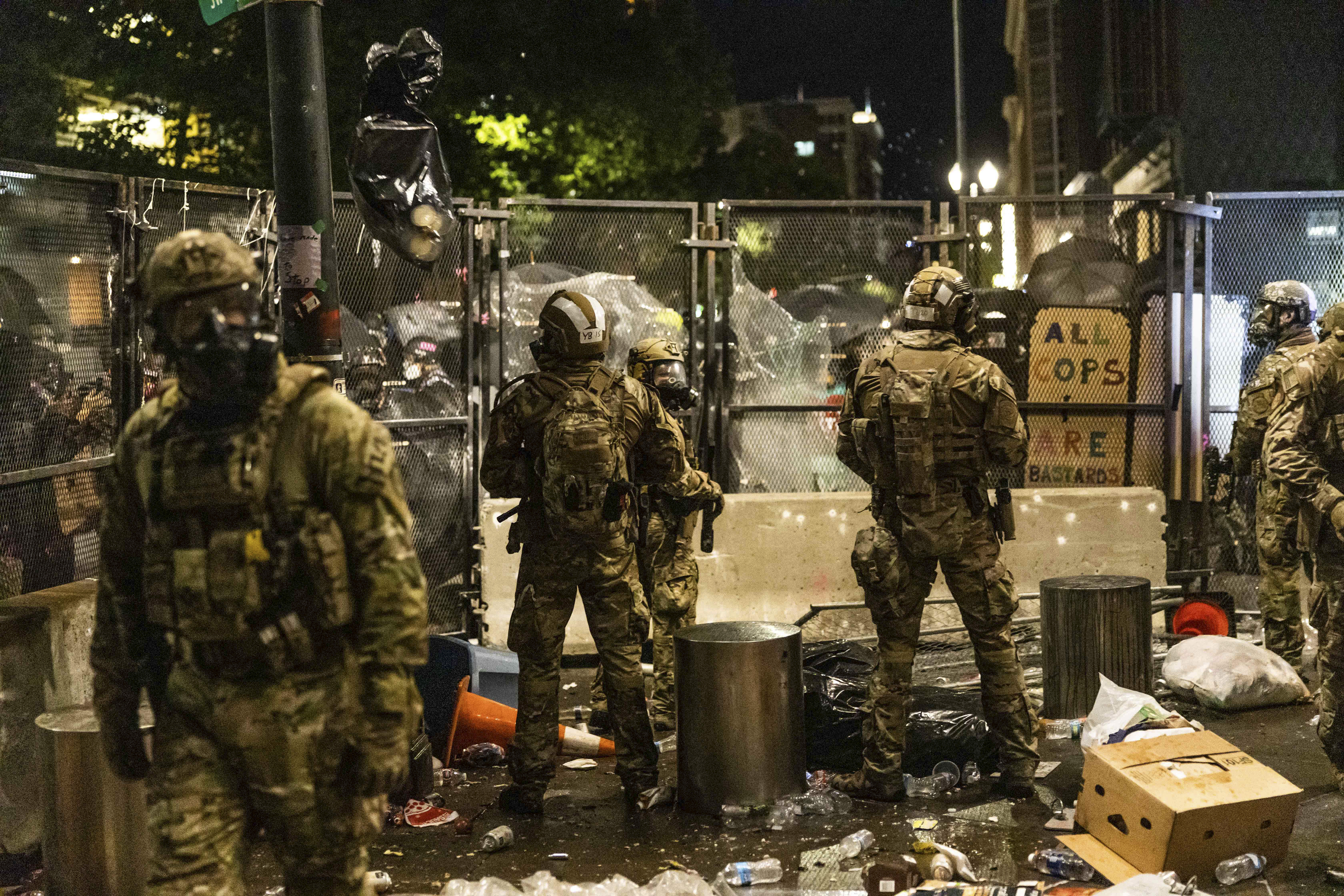
U.S. Customs and Border Protection agents and protesters at the Mark O. Hatfield federal courthouse perimeter barricade on July 25, 2020

Both the mayor of Portland and the governor of Oregon called for federal officers to leave the city, with the governor describing the federal action as being "like adding gasoline to a fire". At a July 21 press conference, however, Acting DHS Secretary Wolf said federal law enforcement officers "will not retreat" in protecting government buildings in Portland. Federal officers arrested 43 people in Portland between July 4 and 21. On July 23, Michael Horowitz, the Department of Justice Inspector General, announced that he and the Inspector General's office at the Department of Homeland Security would be investigating the federal law enforcement responses in Portland, "examining the training and instruction that was provided to the DOJ law enforcement personnel; compliance with applicable identification requirements, rules of engagement, and legal authorities; and adherence to DOJ policies regarding the use of less-lethal munitions, chemical agents, and other uses of force."

Governor Kate Brown announced on July 29 that she had reached an agreement with Vice President Mike Pence for a phased withdrawal of federal officers from Portland. In return, the Oregon State Police would improve security around federal buildings. The agreement went in force on July 30, with state and local police guarding the buildings, and protests that night were peaceful. On August 13, a spokesman for the Oregon State Police, Timothy Fox, communicated a statement saying that the agency was withdrawing the deployment assigned to protect the federal courthouse pursuant the Brown-Pence agreement two weeks earlier, citing, as Reuters reported, "frustration at a prosecutor's decision not to indict many people arrested in protests there" in the intervening weeks; according to the same report, Multnomah County District Attorney Mike Schmidt had stated two days earlier that he would "dro[p] lesser charges" against protesters "such as rioting and disorderly conduct", focusing prosecutions only on protesters "arrested for assault, theft or property damage".

Following violent protests on the night of August 25, President Trump tweeted that Governor Brown and Portland Mayor Ted Wheeler should request the deployment of the National Guard to "end this problem immediately" while also urging them to "stop calling these anarchists and agitators 'peaceful protesters'". By August 27, 74 people faced federal charges related to the protests, with charges ranging from assaulting a federal officer to arson. On August 28, Mayor Wheeler wrote an open letter to President Trump asking him not to send the National Guard to the city, saying that "We don't need your politics of division and demagoguery." Around this time, National Guard had been deployed to Kenosha, Wisconsin after similar unrest in that city.

On September 1, in an effort to revoke funding, Trump issued a memo calling on Attorney General William Barr and the director of the Office of Management and Budget (OMB) to review and submit a detailed report on all federal funding to Portland, Seattle, New York City, Washington, D.C., and other "anarchist jurisdictions" that receive federal grants. "My administration will not allow federal tax dollars to fund cities that allow themselves to deteriorate into lawless zones," Trump wrote. New York governor Andrew Cuomo called the action an "illegal stunt" and said the president is "not a king". On September 21, the Department of Justice designated Portland, Seattle, and New York City as jurisdictions that had failed to counteract violence and property destruction during protests. OMB would separately submit guidance on restricting the cities' eligibility for federal funding.

A 2021 DHS internal report found that senior DHS officials had sought to portray the Portland protests, without evidence, as an organized effort by antifa to attack government institutions, had encouraged staff to conduct illegal warrantless searches of the cellphones of arrested protesters, and had compiled dossiers on protesters in order to attempt to prove coordination.

=== Police ===
On June 6, PPB chief of police Resch, announced that she had appointed Chuck Lovell as "the exact right person at the exact right moment" to serve as the new city police chief; Resch stated that she would remain on the force but in another role. Lovell, who became the bureau's fourth Black police chief, expressed hope that police and the community could join to build trust and change the institutional disregard for human life that led to Floyd's murder.

A month later, on July 8, the executive board of the Portland Police Association expressed "no confidence" in the City Council and expressed frustration with its perceived lack of support for the police bureau. The following day, the PPB deputy police chief, Chris Davis, commented on the challenges of coordinating with federal officers, and the distinction between what he termed "legitimate protest" vs. "criminal activity."

After federal agencies began tactical operations in early July, Wheeler and others prominently objected to their presence, and assured the public that local police would not coordinate with the federal agents; however, this was contradicted by reporting from The Oregonian and elsewhere, which demonstrated various forms of coordination. Portland fire commissioner Jo Ann Hardesty barred local and federal police from using fire bureau property to stage tactical operations.

State and local agencies expressed concern about the effects of "unprecedented" amounts of gas deployed by police agencies on drinking water.

=== Community ===
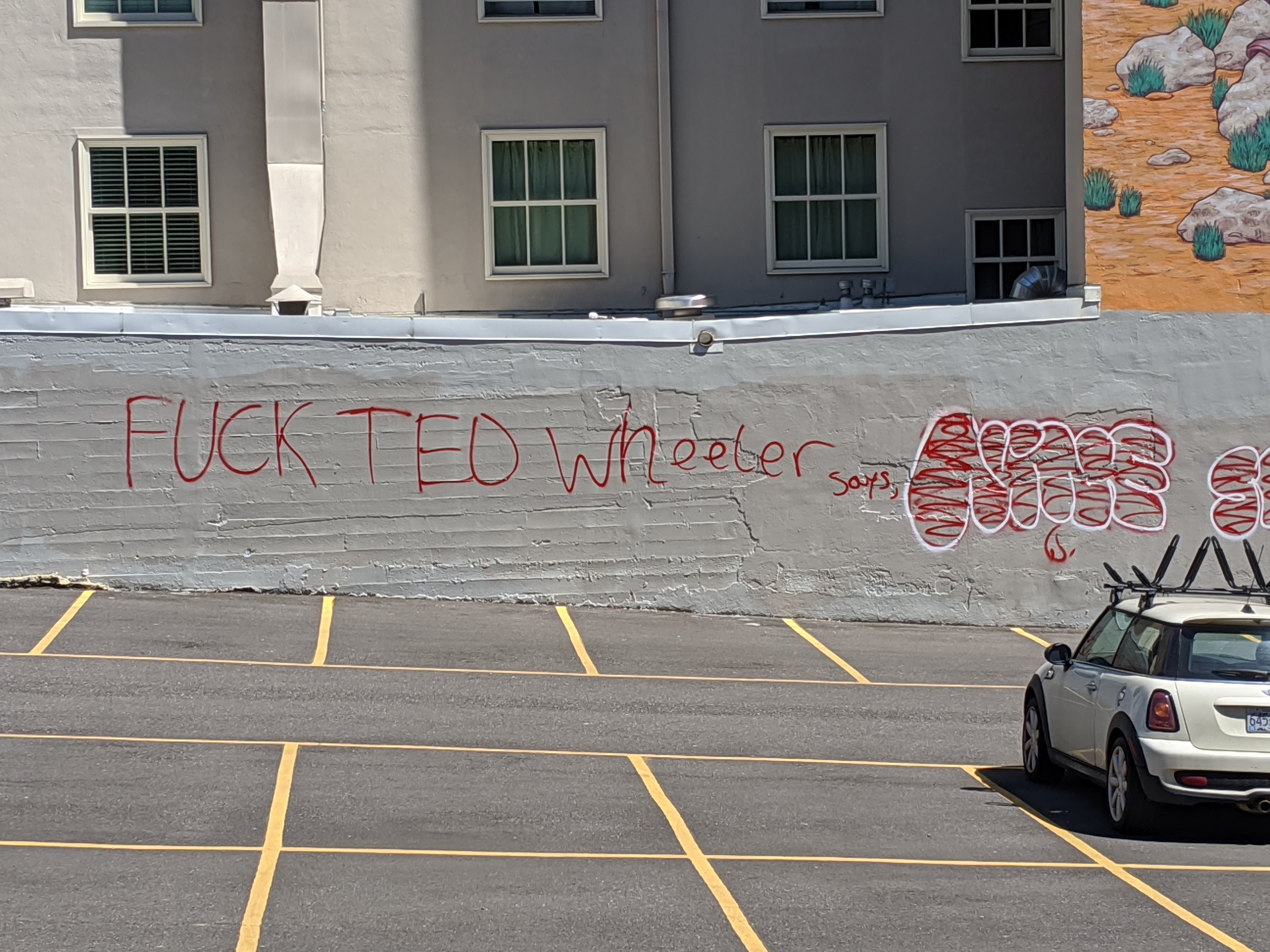
Graffiti on Odd Fellows Building in opposition to Mayor Ted Wheeler

Rev. Mondainé of Portland's NAACP chapter spoke against looting and vandalism. Some restaurant owners expressed support for the protesters via social media and by contributing to organizations working to assist people of color and combat police brutality, among other causes. Le Pigeon sustained damage during the demonstrations; owner Gabriel Rucker said, "To the person that smashed my window last night I hear you and I hope you find a voice that screams louder than broken glass. To the person who broke my window last night I love you and if you were hungry I would cook you a meal."

The Portland Committee on Community-Engaged Policing organized a Zoom conference. More than 320 people participated, and committee members passed a resolution asking elected and law officials to "stand against white supremacy and police violence". Furthermore, the resolution says, "We must do more than make symbolic statements against racism. We must change the outcomes of policing, reducing incidents of violence, and the targeting of communities of color and other marginalized groups." On June 1, the organization SOLVE organized a volunteer cleanup effort in downtown in collaboration with local businesses. Hundreds of volunteers filled approximately 150 trash bags, while social distancing because of the COVID-19 pandemic.

In late June, Rose City Justice, the organization that had organized the largest marches, ceased sponsoring marches in response to questions and concerns from other entities in the Black Lives Matter movement. Some expressed dissatisfaction with large demonstrations that did not directly engage in direct action and civil disobedience to effect change; others questioned whether the donations the group had received, which exceeded $24,000, were being put to appropriate use.

Between September 3 and September 8, an online poll of 502 Oregon voters found that 66% of voters statewide disapproved of the ongoing Portland protests and said that they did not do much to improve the lives of Black citizens, with 55% of those specifically saying the nightly demonstrations in the city should be labeled as "riots" rather than "protests". The independent survey, conducted by DHM Research, also found that 59% of respondents disapproved of President Donald Trump's response to the protests, 58% disapproved of Mayor Ted Wheeler's handling of the unrest, and 56% gave negative marks to Governor Kate Brown's response, though more respondents strongly disapproved of the president's response than the governor or mayor's. In regards to police response to the protests, 46% approved while 45% disapproved, while 66% of those aged 18–29 believed police were using too much force, among other data points. The survey had a margin of error of 4.4 percent.

=== Lawsuits ===
As of June 18, 2020, at least nine lawsuits had been filed by protesters and the non-profit Don't Shoot Portland against the City of Portland, asserting that the protesters had been injured or sent running in fear for their lives by indiscriminate and excessive police use of rubber bullets, explosive devices such as flash-bangs, and/or tear gas. The suits sought financial damages, and most also sought a ban on those means of crowd dispersal. On June 9, in response to the earliest suits, U.S. District Judge Marco A. Hernandez granted a 14-day temporary restraining order significantly restricting police use of tear gas.

The Oregon chapter of the American Civil Liberties Union filed a lawsuit against the City of Portland, the Portland Police Bureau, and other law enforcement entities on June 28, claiming that police targeted and attacked journalists and legal observers On July 17, the ACLU added the Department of Homeland Security (DHS) and the United States Marshals Service as defendants to that lawsuit, and on July 23, federal judge Michael Simon granted a 14-day temporary restraining order blocking federal law enforcement from arresting or using force against journalists or legal observers without probable cause, barring the arrest of journalists or legal observers for failure to disperse, and barring seizure of journalists' press passes or equipment unless they were being lawfully arrested. The ACLU later filed an additional lawsuit on behalf of medics.

Local journalists Cory Elia and Lesley McLam sued the City of Portland and law enforcement agencies after having been arrested on June 30. The lawsuit sought a restraining order that would bar law enforcement officers from violating journalists' rights, as well as seeking damages for injuries, and it resulted in a restraining order.

The Oregon Attorney General, Ellen Rosenblum, filed a lawsuit against DHS, the U.S. Marshals Service, Customs and Border Protection, and the Federal Protective Service, accusing the agencies of violating First, Fourth and Fifth amendment rights of Oregon residents by seizing and detaining protesters without probable cause, and asking for a temporary restraining order against such acts. On July 24, U.S. District Judge Michael Mosman ruled that the state lacked standing to file the suit and denied the state's request for a temporary restraining order.

On July 27, Protect Democracy and Perkins Coie filed a federal lawsuit on behalf of Wall of Moms, Don't Shoot Portland, and several protesters against DHS, Customs and Border Protection, Immigration and Customs Enforcement, the U.S. Marshals Service, the Federal Protective Service, the Department of Justice, and the heads of these federal agencies. The suit accuses the defendants of violating the plaintiffs' First Amendment rights and using excessive force, and it also claims that several of the "acting" officials were not confirmed for their roles and were overstepping their legal authority. The suit seeks to limit federal law enforcement to protecting federal property and to bar them from using specific actions, such as excessive crowd-control measures and custodial detentions without probable cause.

On August 24, a legal team led by attorney David Sugerman filed a class action lawsuit against the federal government including Acting DHS Secretary Chad Wolf, Deputy Secretary Kenneth Cuccinelli and others as defendants, charging that the Trump administration violated protesters' Fourth Amendment rights when they tried to quell demonstrations by using tear gas and rubber bullets.

More than one of the federal lawsuit lists John Does among the defendants, as the identities and agency affiliations of the officers accused of wrongdoing was not known.

== Social and political impact ==
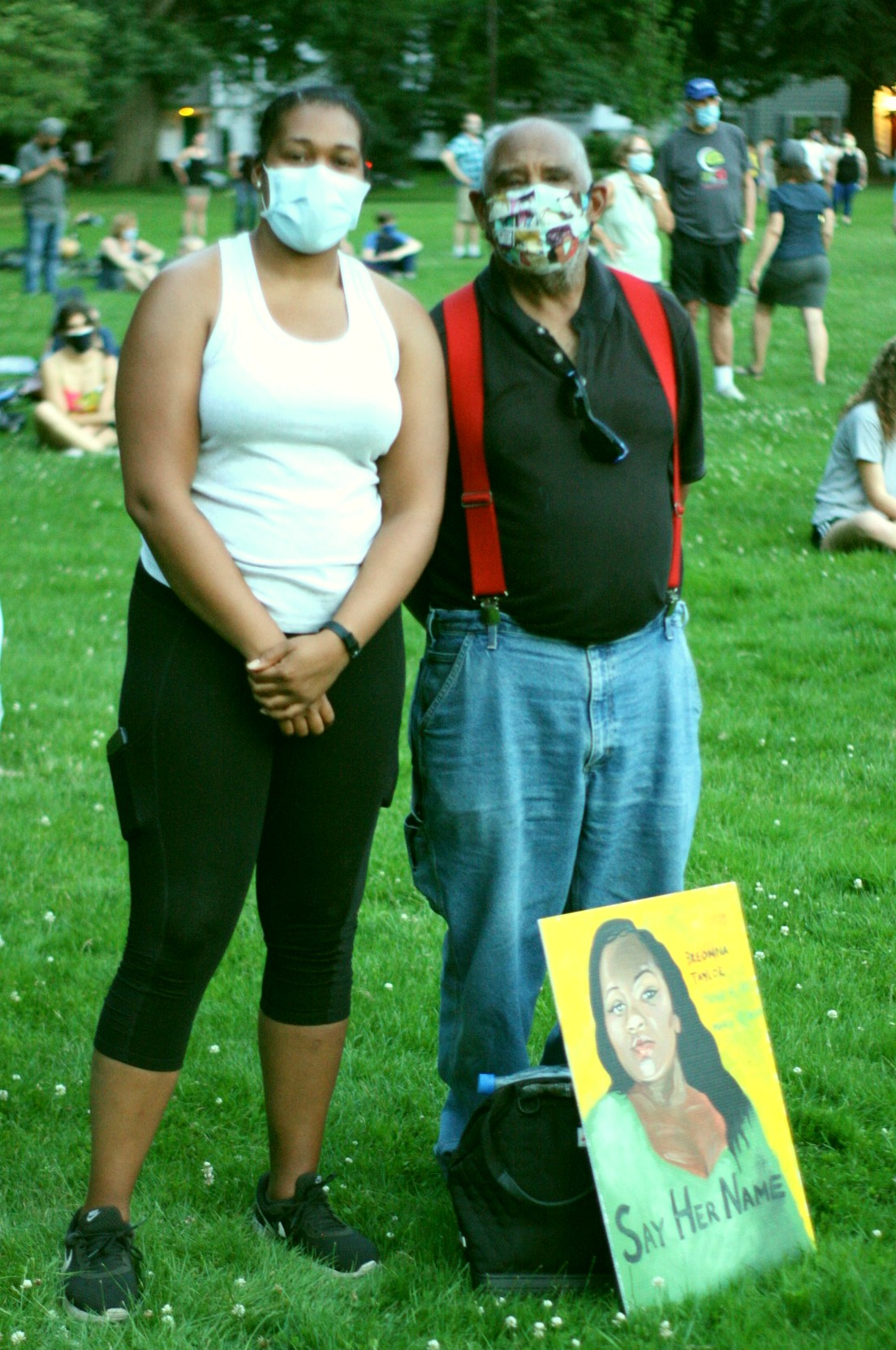
Kent Ford (right), founder of the Portland Black Panthers, displays a picture of Breonna Taylor at a protest at Reed College on June 23, 2020.

Several political and policy developments were influenced by the demonstrations. With regard to the deployment and management of local police forces, the Portland Public Schools and the other two school districts in Portland ended a program in which twelve Portland Police "school resource officers" patrolled the halls of nine high schools. In August 2020 Portland State University disarmed its campus police force, following two years of advocacy from its student body and in response to incidents of police brutality.

With regard to political offices and elections, Portland police chief Jami announced she would step down June 8, and was succeeded by Chuck Lovell. Multnomah County District Attorney (DA) Rod Underhill, who had initially intended to serve out a full term, decided to retire early and urged the Governor to appoint as replacement Mike Schmidt, who had garnered 76% of the vote in his May 2020 election as the new county DA (term otherwise to have begun in January 2021). Upon assuming office in August 2020, Schmidt announced new policies limiting prosecution of protesters to those charged with "assault, theft or property damage", and dropping charges for "rioting and disorderly conduct", a decision which led to withdrawal of the Oregon State Police from Portland soon after. Schmidt's election was characterized in The Oregonian as marking a turning point for the office away from the legacy of earlier longtime DA Mike Schrunk (Underhill's immediate predecessor), a turning that reflected the increasing election of progressive DAs nationwide.

With regard to the oversight and funding of local police departments, the Portland City Council reduced the police bureau's funding by $15 million in June 2020, reallocating some of that amount to the Portland Street Response team. In November 2020 Portlanders voted to pass a measure that would overhaul police oversight, creating a Community Police Oversight Board to take the place of the existing Portland Independent Police Review. The measure was championed by Commissioner Jo Ann Hardesty, but has drawn criticism by City Auditor Mary Hull Caballero.

With regard to legislative action, the Oregon Legislative Assembly passed six criminal justice reform laws in June 2020 during a special session. In other action, an initiative called "Reimagine Oregon" was launched in July 2020 by the Urban League of Portland, the African-American Leadership Fund, and other groups. The group has published more than 100 policy proposals to address racial injustice, and invited the public to comment on the proposals by September 11.

== See also ==
- Black Lives Matter art in Portland, Oregon
- Demetria Hester
- Indigenous Peoples Day of Rage
- Nightmare Elk
- Normandale Park shooting
- We Stand with You, 2020 mural
