= Albina Ministerial Alliance =

- Location: Portland, Oregon, U.S.

The Albina Ministerial Alliance is organization of pastors based in Portland, Oregon, representing predominantly African American congregations since in the 1960s. The group has a Coalition for Justice and Police Reform. According to The Skanner's Saundra Sorenson, the Coalition "has a long history of working on a deep policy level to effect change in local law enforcement practices, often in response to police killings".

== History ==
The group hosted John Lewis in Portland in 1989. Civl rights activist Allen Bethel serves as president, as of 2020.
