= Sharon Meieran =

American politician in Oregon

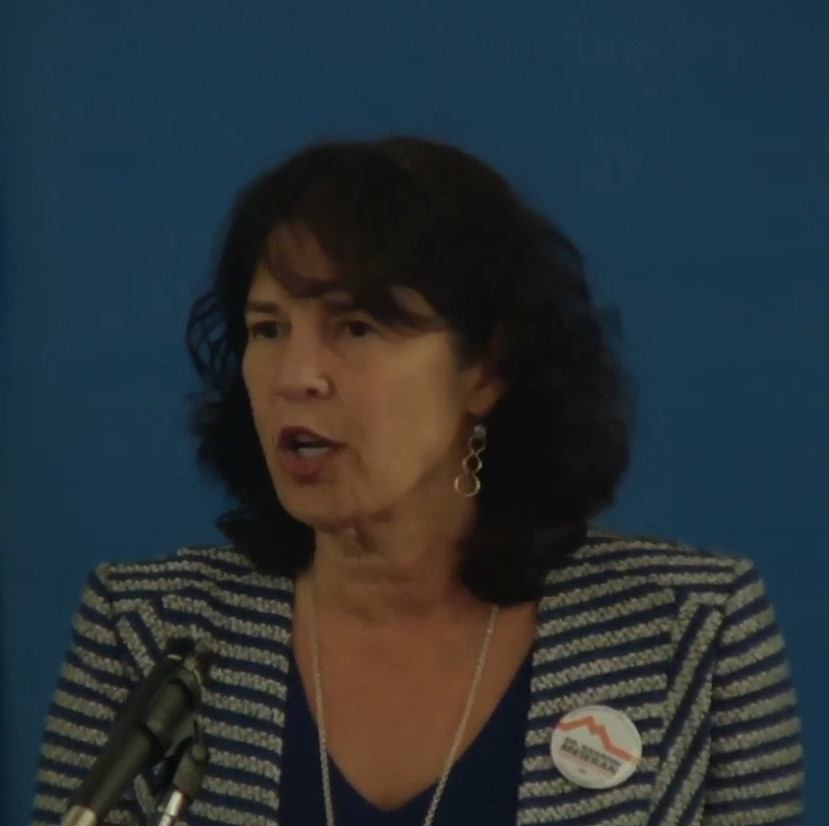

Multnomah County Commissioner
- In office January 3, 2017 – January 1, 2025
- Preceded by: Jules Bailey
- Succeeded by: Meghan Moyer
- Constituency: 1st district

Personal details
- Spouse: Fred
- Children: 2
- Education: UC Berkeley (BA) UC Law SF (JD) UCSF (MD)

Sharon Meieran is an American physician, lawyer, and politician who served as a county commissioner for Multnomah County, Oregon from January 3, 2017 to January 1, 2025, representing district 1.

== Early life and education ==
Meieran grew up in the San Francisco Bay Area and graduated from UC Berkeley with degrees in English and Economics. She earned her JD at UC Law and MD from UCSF School of Medicine.

== Career ==
=== Multnomah County Commissioner ===
In her first term as commissioner Meieran sponsored a resolution to declare prescription opioids an "ongoing public nuisance" in Multnomah County. The resolution passed unanimously on July 27, 2017, granting county attorneys the authority to bring litigation against drug manufacturers. On August 4 the county filed lawsuits against dozens of drug companies including Purdue Pharma.

Meieran was an early advocate of shutdown orders at the onset of the COVID-19 pandemic, calling for restaurants and bars to be closed on March 16, 2020. On April 2 Meieran criticized Governor Brown's shutdown order for exempting construction and manufacturing, and called for the appointment of a "coronavirus czar" to oversee the statewide response.

In October 2020 she proposed absorbing the Portland Police into the Multnomah County Sheriff's Office, citing overlap in their responsibilities as well as the county's existing roles in prosecution, incarceration, and supervised release.

In an April 28 interview Meieran criticized the Joint Office of Homeless Service's plan to spend the $2.5 billion Metro homeless services bond passed the previous year, calling it vague and lacking urgency. She proposed an alternate 6-month plan to identify where temporary homeless shelters could be built.

In July 2023 Meieran opposed a plan by the county health department to distribute tin foil and straws to fentanyl users, stating "Not all harm reduction is created equal. Narcan distribution and syringe exchange have been proven to save lives. Distribution of safe smoking kits is done in a number of places, but it’s not clear what harm is prevented, if any." The plan was suspended by chair Vega Pederson 3 days after it was first reported.

In September 2023 Meieran criticized a decision to replace the county's former sobering center, which closed in 2020, with a stabilization center intended for longer-term treatment. Unlike the previous center, which accepted drop offs from first responders and was often described as a "drunk tank", the replacement would provide 30–60 days of transitional housing and stabilization treatment for patients leaving other sobering programs. Meieran emphasized the need for a new crisis treatment center, saying she frequently sees patients with addiction issues in the emergency room due to the lack of better options.

=== 2022 Run for Multnomah County Chair ===
On September 13, 2021, Meieran announced her candidacy for Multnomah County Chair in the 2022 election. Her campaign focused on pandemic recovery, homelessness, mental health, and addiction issues. Meieran promised to create alternative shelter sites in every Portland neighborhood with sleeping and sanitation facilities, as well as "safe parking sites" throughout the county where homeless residents could sleep in their vehicles. She also emphasized her volunteer work providing medical care to homeless Portlanders.

With no candidate receiving an outright majority in the May primary, Meieran advanced to a runoff election against fellow commissioner Jessica Vega Pederson. The runoff received significant media coverage due to its potential impact on large sanctioned camping sites proposed by Mayor Wheeler, who had previously threatened to pull city funding from the Joint Office of Homeless Services overseen by the County Chair. On October 29 Wheeler invited both Meieran and Vega Pederson to give testimony before city council regarding his proposals.

On November 8, 2022, Meieran was defeated by Vega Pederson in the general election.

== Personal life ==
Meieran lives in Southwest Portland with her husband and their two children. She is Jewish.

== Electoral history ==
2022 Multnomah County Commission Chair
Party	Candidate	Votes	%
Nonpartisan	Jessica Vega Pederson	164,914	54.03%
Nonpartisan	Sharon Meieran	138,034	45.23%
Other	Write-ins	2,263	0.74%
Total votes		305,211	100.00%

2022 Primary for Multnomah County Commission Chair
Party	Candidate	Votes	%
Nonpartisan	Jessica Vega Pederson	77,529	41.95%
Nonpartisan	Sharon Meieran	33,651	18.21%
Nonpartisan	Sharia Mayfield	27,713	14.99%
Nonpartisan	Lori Stegmann	23,210	12.56%
Nonpartisan	Bruce Broussard	12,895	6.98%
Nonpartisan	Joe Demers	9,544	5.16%
Other	Write-ins	290	0.16%
Total votes		184,832	100.00%

2020 Primary for Multnomah County Commission District 1
Party	Candidate	Votes	%
Nonpartisan	Sharon Meieran	59,184	90.01%
Nonpartisan	Jason Tokuda	6,290	9.57%
Other	Write-ins	280	0.43%
Total votes		65,754	100.00%

November 2016 General Election Official Precinct Results
Party	Candidate	Votes	%
Nonpartisan	Sharon Meieran	58,904	67.22%
Nonpartisan	Eric Zimmerman	28,214	32.20%
Other	Write-ins	516	0.59%
Total votes		87,634	100.00%

2016 Primary for Multnomah County Commission District 1
Party	Candidate	Votes	%
Nonpartisan	Sharon Meieran	24,728	42.35%
Nonpartisan	Eric Zimmerman	13,089	22.42%
Nonpartisan	Mel Rader	6,492	11.12%
Nonpartisan	Marisha Childs	5,889	10.09%
Nonpartisan	Brian Wilson	5,119	8.77%
Nonpartisan	Ken Stokes	1,492	2.56%
Nonpartisan	Wes Soderback	1,205	2.06%
Other	Write-ins	372	0.64%
Total votes		58,386	100.00%

2012 Democratic Primary, Oregon House of Representatives, 36th District
Party	Candidate	Votes	%
Democratic	Jennifer Williamson	5,418	53.3%
Democratic	Sharon Meieran	4,509	44.3%
Democratic	Benjamin Jay Barber	240	2.4%
Total votes		37,840	100.00%
