= Moms United for Black Lives =

Activist group based in Portland, Oregon, U.S.

- Abbreviation: MU4BL
- Nickname: Moms United
- Formation: 2020; 6 years ago
- Location: Portland, Oregon, United States

Moms United for Black Lives (also known as Moms United, or MU4BL) is an activist group based in Portland, Oregon, with branches in other U.S. cities, including New York and San Diego. The group, founded in 2020, was a fixture at the George Floyd protests in Portland; they wore yellow shirts, helmets, goggles, and gas masks, and they lead hundreds of people in chants as they marched to the Mark O. Hatfield federal courthouse.

Moms United was founded and is led by a collective of Black women, including Don't Shoot Portland’s founder Teressa Raiford and activists Demetria Hester and Danialle James. The group was created after controversy erupted in Portland's Wall of Moms protest group, where the leader was accused of being anti-Black. Thousands of women left Wall of Moms to join Moms United for Black Lives.

“We want reparations written into law. We want people to understand that Black lives do matter. We want Teressa Raiford as mayor. And we want to defund the police.” explained MU4BL founder Demetria Hester. The MU4BL network aims to provide support, aid, and assistance to communities around the U.S. The key focus of Moms United for Black Lives is to address the problems of Portland's Black communities and “listen to Black women," according to Teressa Raiford.

== See also ==
- 2020 in Oregon
- 2020 Portland, Oregon, mayoral election
- Anti-racism
- Misogynoir – Term for a type of misogyny toward black women
- Mothers of the Movement
