= Ted Wheeler =

American politician (born 1962)

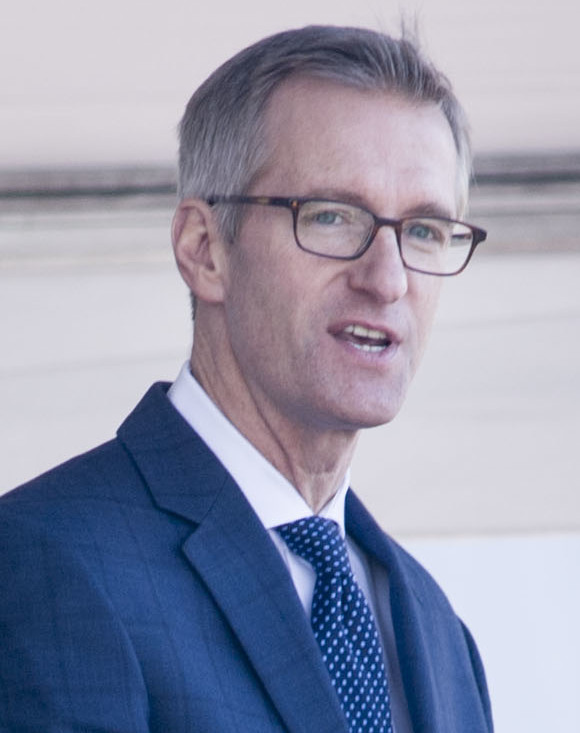
- Wheeler in 2018

53rd Mayor of Portland
- In office January 1, 2017 – January 1, 2025
- Preceded by: Charlie Hales
- Succeeded by: Keith Wilson

28th Treasurer of Oregon
- In office March 11, 2010 – January 1, 2017
- Governor: Ted Kulongoski; John Kitzhaber; Kate Brown
- Preceded by: Ben Westlund
- Succeeded by: Tobias Read

Chair of the Multnomah County Commission
- In office January 1, 2007 – March 11, 2010
- Preceded by: Diane Linn
- Succeeded by: Jeff Cogen

Personal details
- Born: Edward Tevis Wheeler; August 31, 1962 (age 64) Portland, Oregon, U.S.
- Party: Republican (before 2001); Democratic (2001–present)
- Spouse: Katrina Maley (m. 2005; div. 2020)
- Children: 1
- Education: Stanford University (BA); Columbia University (MBA); Harvard University (MPP)

Edward Tevis Wheeler (born August 31, 1962) is an American politician and businessman who served as the 53rd mayor of Portland, Oregon, from 2017 to 2025. A moderate member of the Democratic Party, Wheeler served as the state treasurer of Oregon from 2010 to 2016 and the chair of the Multnomah County Commission from 2007 to 2010.

Wheeler was elected in the 2016 Portland mayoral election and reelected in 2020. Formerly a registered Republican, he has been described as a moderate Democrat.

== Early life and education ==
A sixth-generation Oregonian, Wheeler was born in Portland to a family with roots and wealth in the Oregon timber industry. His father, Sam Wheeler, was executive vice president at Willamette Industries, a Fortune 500 lumber company formed in 1967 by mergers and acquisitions of timber companies (Sam Wheeler sold Wheeler Lumber Company, incorporated in 1900 by Wheeler's great-grandfather, Coleman Wheeler, in Wheeler, Tillamook County, Oregon.) Sam Wheeler divorced Ted's mother, Leslie, in 1972; Wheeler was 10 years old at the time. He later discussed his father's alcoholism.

Ted Wheeler attended Portland Public Schools, graduating from Lincoln High School. He received a bachelor's degree in economics from Stanford University in 1985. He also earned an MBA from Columbia University in 1989 and a master's in public policy from Harvard University. Wheeler worked for several financial services companies, including Bank of America and Copper Mountain Trust.

== Political career ==
Wheeler's political career began with a campaign for the Boston City Council. He finished 11th in a field of 12 candidates in the 1993 Boston City Council election. Wheeler was registered as a Republican until 2001 and described as "the wealthy heir to a timber fortune controlled by social and fiscal conservatives". In 2006, he defeated incumbent Multnomah County chair Diane Linn to become chair of the Multnomah County Board of Commissioners, taking office in January 2007.

=== Multnomah County Commissioner ===
Shortly after he was elected chair of the Multnomah County Board of Commissioners, Wheeler worked with his colleagues to balance a county budget that had called for $22.3 million in cuts in 2009. Wheeler also fought to preserve social safety net programs and to eliminate hidden fees from state-issued debit cards.

Following the loss of nearly $16 million in Oregon Common School Fund and Oregon Public Employees Retirement Fund investments, Wheeler co-filed a class-action lawsuit with Attorney General Ellen Rosenblum to recover the money after firms misled investors.

Building, preserving and updating public space and infrastructure was a focus during Wheeler's time as County Commissioner. He led efforts to construct new libraries in Kenton and Troutdale and to construct the new East County Courthouse in Multnomah County. Wheeler also fought to fund repairs for the crumbling Sellwood Bridge.

Under Wheeler Portland became Oregon's first municipality to "Ban the Box", which reduces employment discrimination against residents with a criminal record by removing the criminal history check box on forms.

=== State treasurer ===
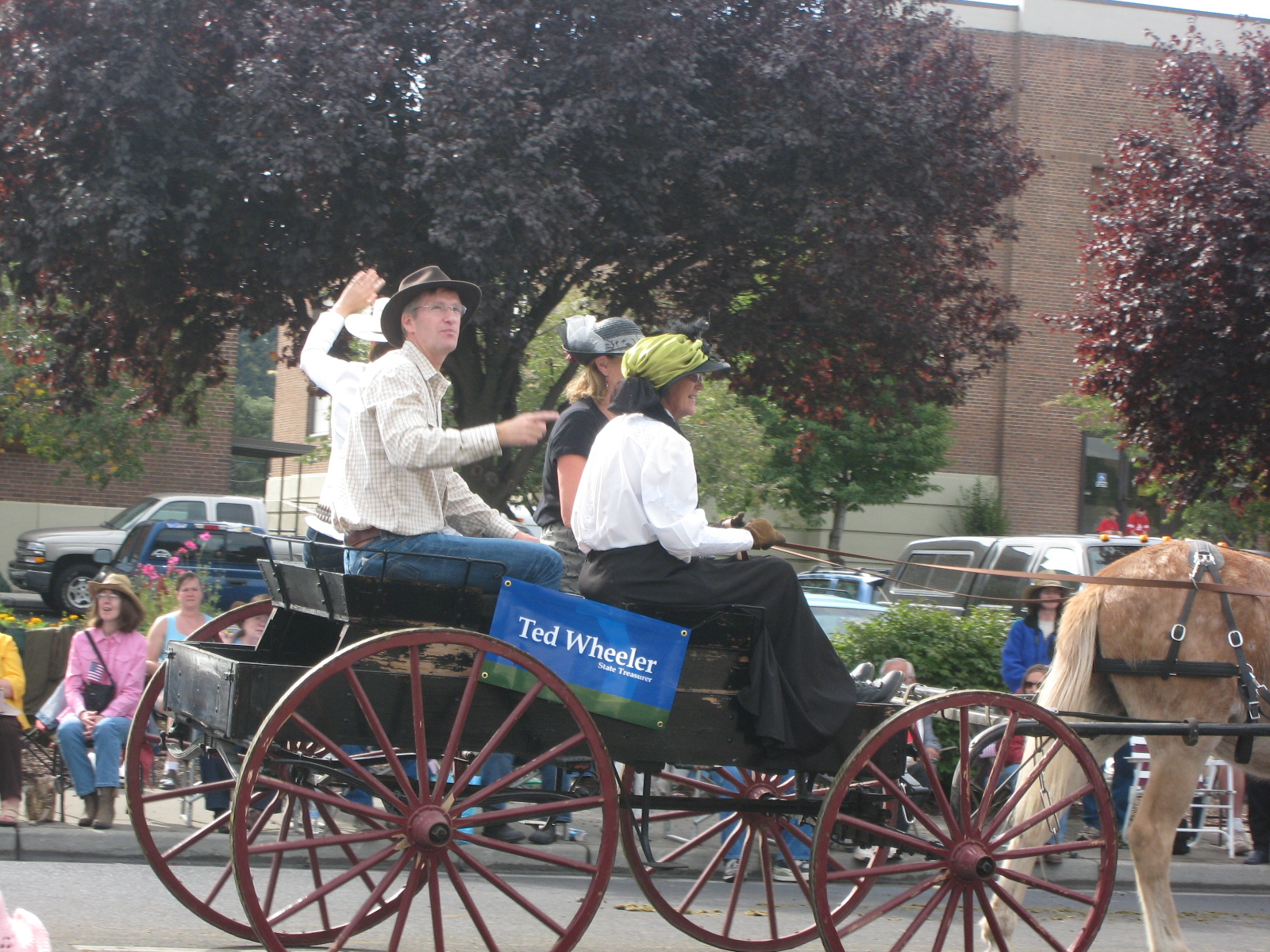
Wheeler at the 2010 Pendleton Round-Up parade

On March 7, 2010, incumbent Oregon State Treasurer Ben Westlund died of lung cancer. Two days later Governor Ted Kulongoski appointed Wheeler to the office. Wheeler defeated fellow Democrat Rick Metsger in the Democratic primary election on May 18, 2010, and defeated Republican Chris Telfer, Progressive Walt Brown and Michael Marsh of the Constitution Party in the November special election for the rest of Westlund's term, which ended in 2013. He was elected to a second full term in the Oregon state elections, 2012.

Wheeler practiced aggressive financial management, achieving more than $172 million in cash flow savings since 2013. He promoted environmental stewardship, committing to double Oregon's investments in renewable energy resources by January 2020, and double them again by 2030. Wheeler also pledged not to pursue new investments in coal. He promoted the use of ESG (Environmental Social Governance) for all state investments to improve long-term performance, and urged the Securities and Exchange Commission to institute tougher reviews of carbon asset risk disclosures from 45 major corporations.

Wheeler was chair of the Oregon Retirement Savings Task Force, which developed what became the OregonSaves program to assist state residents in saving for retirement. It grew Oregon's pension fund to more than $72 billion, one of the country's five strongest state pension funds.

=== Portland mayoral campaign ===
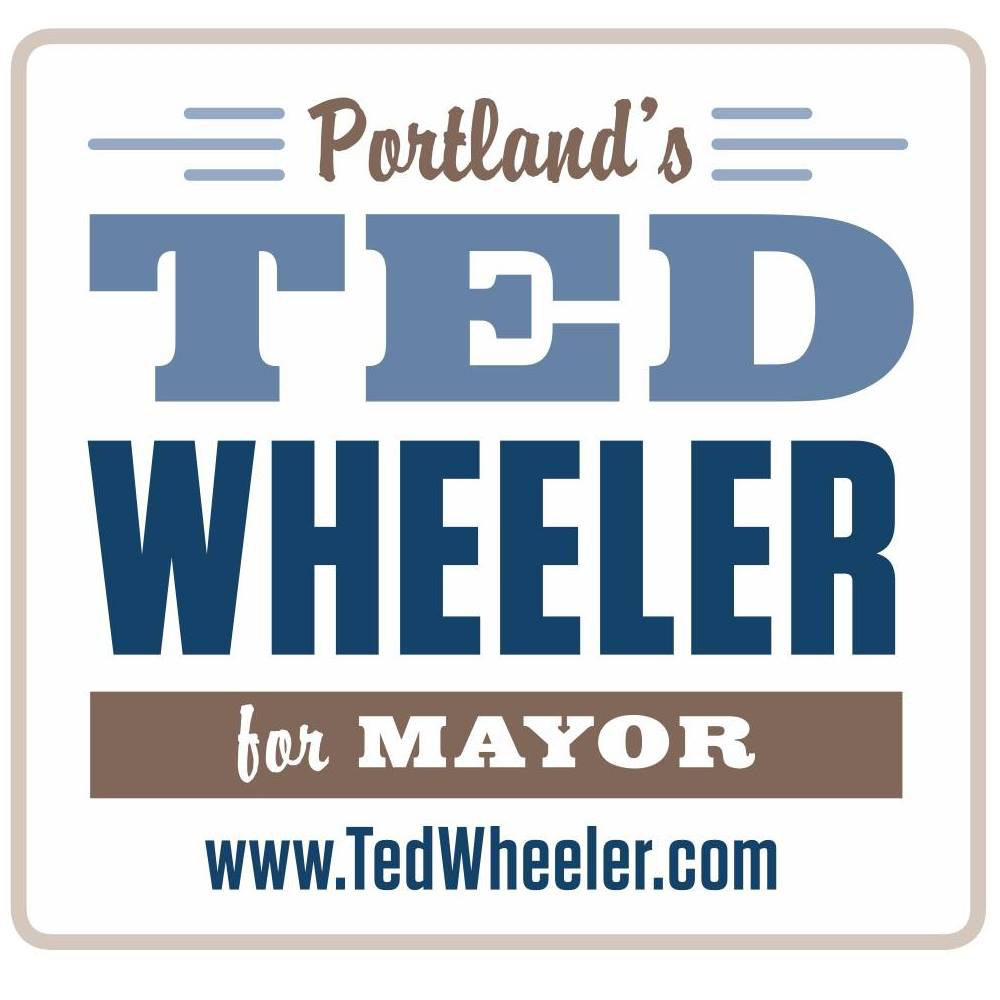
Wheeler's campaign logo

Wheeler launched a run for mayor on October 14, 2015. He campaigned on addressing income inequality and ensuring government accountability. During his speech, Wheeler promised to build a government that worked "for every person."

Taking care of those in need. Taking responsibility for protecting our environment. Taking action right now to close the gap between our wealthiest and poorest residents by providing economic opportunity for lower-income and middle-income families. Equal access to our government for every person. Understanding that every dollar we spend came from a taxpayer and we need show our respect for how hard that taxpayer worked to earn those dollars by spending them wisely. These are the authentic values of Portland. And these are my values.

— Ted Wheeler

In October 2015, former Portland mayors Vera Katz, Tom Potter, and Sam Adams endorsed Wheeler. Gresham Mayor Shane Bemis also endorsed him, as did State Representatives Lew Frederick and Tobias Read, former State Senators Ron Cease, Jane Cease, and Avel Gordly, and 2012 mayoral candidate Eileen Brady. Wheeler was also endorsed by Basic Rights Oregon, the Portland Business Alliance, and the Columbia Pacific Building Trades Council.

On May 17 Wheeler was elected mayor by winning the first round with 54% of the vote.

=== Mayoral tenure ===
Wheeler was sworn in on December 30, 2016, and his term began on January 1, 2017. One of his first actions was to make initial assignments of city departments (known as bureaus) to the five commissioners, of which the mayor is one. He assigned to himself the Portland Police Bureau, the Portland Development Commission, and the Portland Housing Bureau, among others. He said he intended to reconsider the initial assignments during the annual budget process in April.

In July 2018 The Oregonian newspaper reported that half of arrests in Portland were of people who were homeless. Wheeler, who oversaw the police department, said he saw this as a problem and that it would influence his budgeting decisions. In September 2018, Portland residents who found Wheeler's response to the growth of homeless encampments inadequate petitioned his office and other local agencies to take stronger action.

In September 2020, Wheeler announced his intention to withdraw the city from the Joint Office of Homeless Services partnership with the Multnomah County in a push to get campers on downtown streets into shelters. In 2018, the city auditor found that the city regularly ignored citizen complaints about transient camps. The Oregonian reported the city's lack of response was inconsistent with crackdown on illegal camps instituted earlier in Wheeler's term.

==== Far-right protests and counterprotests ====
In 2017, after white supremacist Jeremy Joseph Christian murdered two people on a Portland train, Wheeler called for a halt to far-right rallies in Portland. He declined to grant a city permit for an event to be staged by far-right provocateur Joey Gibson, and called on the federal government to revoke a rally permit granted to far-right groups in the federally owned Terry Schrunk Plaza. In asking the federal government to revoke that permit, Wheeler incorrectly stated that "hate speech is not protected by the First Amendment." The U.S. General Services Administration declined to revoke the permit. In that rally and subsequent ones in Portland in 2017 and 2018, violence erupted as far-right activists (including Patriot Prayer and the Proud Boys) repeatedly brawled with antifa and other left-wing counter-demonstrators on Portland streets. In October 2018, Wheeler sought greater power to regulate protests, proposing an ordinance that would give him (in his role as police commissioner) greater powers to control the location, duration, timing, and size of protests in Portland and to keep opposing groups physically separated. Wheeler described the measure as an attempt to stop people from "beating the bejesus out of each other on the streets of our city." He described the proposal as a valid time, place, and manner restriction, but the American Civil Liberties Union (ACLU) opposed it, arguing that it would impinge on constitutional rights to freedom of speech and assembly, and indicating that it would legally challenge the ordinance if adopted. In November 2018, the council voted down Wheeler's proposal, 3–2. In August 2019, Wheeler requested that Governor Kate Brown keep the National Guard ready to respond in anticipation of a potentially explosive standoff between far-right groups and antifa demonstrators. Brown and state adjutant general Michael E. Stencel denied the request.

==== George Floyd protests ====
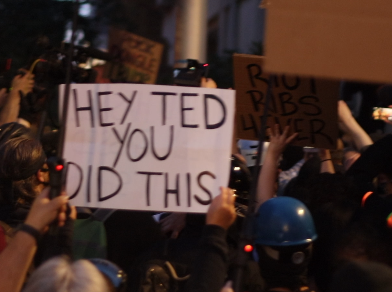
Protest sign complaining about Wheeler during the protests

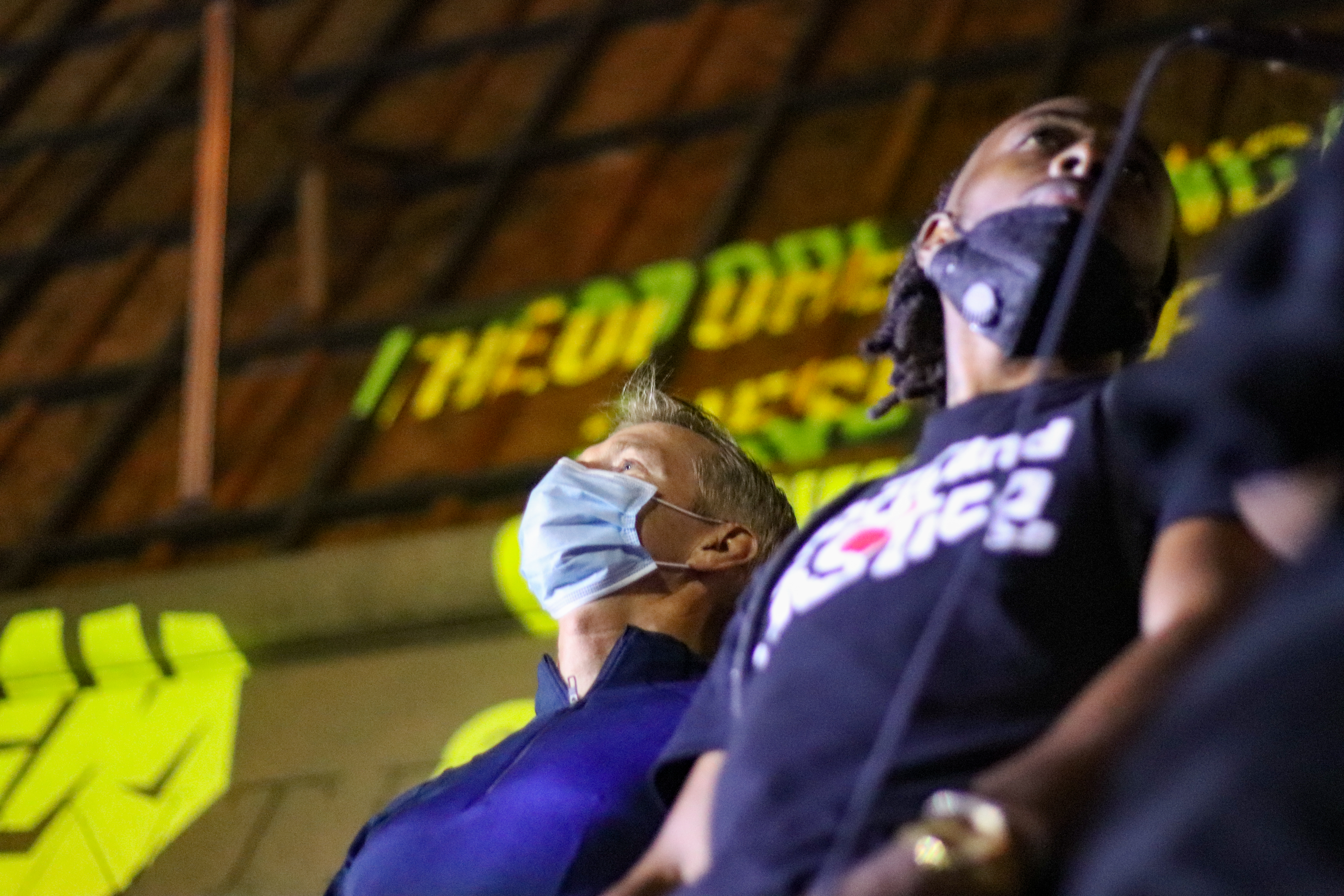
A projection calls Wheeler to resign.

On May 30, 2020, Wheeler imposed a curfew on Portland during the Black Lives Matter protests (sparked by the murder of George Floyd, the fatal police shooting of Breonna Taylor, and the murder of Ahmaud Arbery, earlier in the year). Critics of the curfew argued that police officers would have an incentive to restrict free speech and incite violence on peaceful protesting using crowd-control methods such as tear gas and stun grenades, both of which were deployed on crowds of demonstrators in Portland and nationwide. This earned him the nickname Tear Gas Teddy. On June 2, Wheeler lifted the curfew due to his perception of a "significant [peaceful] shift in the tenor." Wheeler also requested the deployment of the Oregon National Guard to Portland in response to protests following the murder of George Floyd, but Governor Kate Brown refused.

In response to the Portland Police Bureau's use of tear gas on protesters, Portland organization Don't Shoot PDX filed a class-action lawsuit against the city on June 5, 2020. On June 6, Wheeler said that he supported nonviolent demonstrations for "meaningful reform and restorative justice" and had "serious concerns about the use of CS gas for crowd management"; he said he would not ban police from using tear gas, but that he had "directed Portland Police Chief Jami Resch that gas should not be used unless there is a serious and immediate threat to life safety, and there is no other viable alternative for dispersal."

On June 15, Wheeler called for an overhaul of Portland's police oversight system, which he said doesn't have "any real teeth."

Nightly protests at the federal courthouse in Portland were followed by the deployment of federal agents to the city in July 2020, and there were episodes of violent confrontations between demonstrators and law enforcement. After videos showed masked, camouflaged federal agents without identification arresting protesters, Wheeler said, "This is not the America we want. This is not the Portland we want. We're demanding that the President remove these additional troops that he sent to our city. It is not helping to contain or deescalate the situation. It's obviously having exactly the opposite impact." Oregon Governor Brown, and U.S. Senator Jeff Merkley, also called the federal deployment an authoritarian abuse of power; the U.S. Attorney for Oregon, Billy J. Williams, called for an investigation, and Oregon Attorney General Ellen Rosenblum filed a federal lawsuit against DHS.

On July 22, Wheeler addressed nightly protesters, but was booed by them for his actions as Portland Police Commissioner and the Portland Police's own response to the protests. The crowd chanted "Fuck Ted Wheeler" and "Quit Your Job" as he spoke. After speaking, Wheeler and at least five security guards went to the front of the protest area. Wheeler was caught in tear gas released by federal agents. Wheeler left after the first round of tear gas, after which Portland police declared a riot.

At the end of July, in accordance with a deal made between Governor Kate Brown and the federal government, federal agents withdrew from Portland and calm was largely restored in the city, with largely peaceful protests. On August 6 and 7, there were a number of peaceful rallies in the city, but—despite Wheeler urging demonstrators to stay off the street—also renewed violence from demonstrators, including attacks on local police precincts (such as an attempt to set it ablaze); there were also two reports of assaults against elderly women. Police arrested 13 people. Police in Portland used tear gas for the first time since federal forces withdrew from the city. Directly addressing those who had committed violent acts, Wheeler said, "You are not demonstrating, you are attempting to commit murder. Don't think for a moment that you are if you are participating in this activity, you are not being a prop for the reelection campaign of Donald Trump—because you absolutely are. You are creating the B-roll film that will be used in ads nationally to help Donald Trump during this campaign."

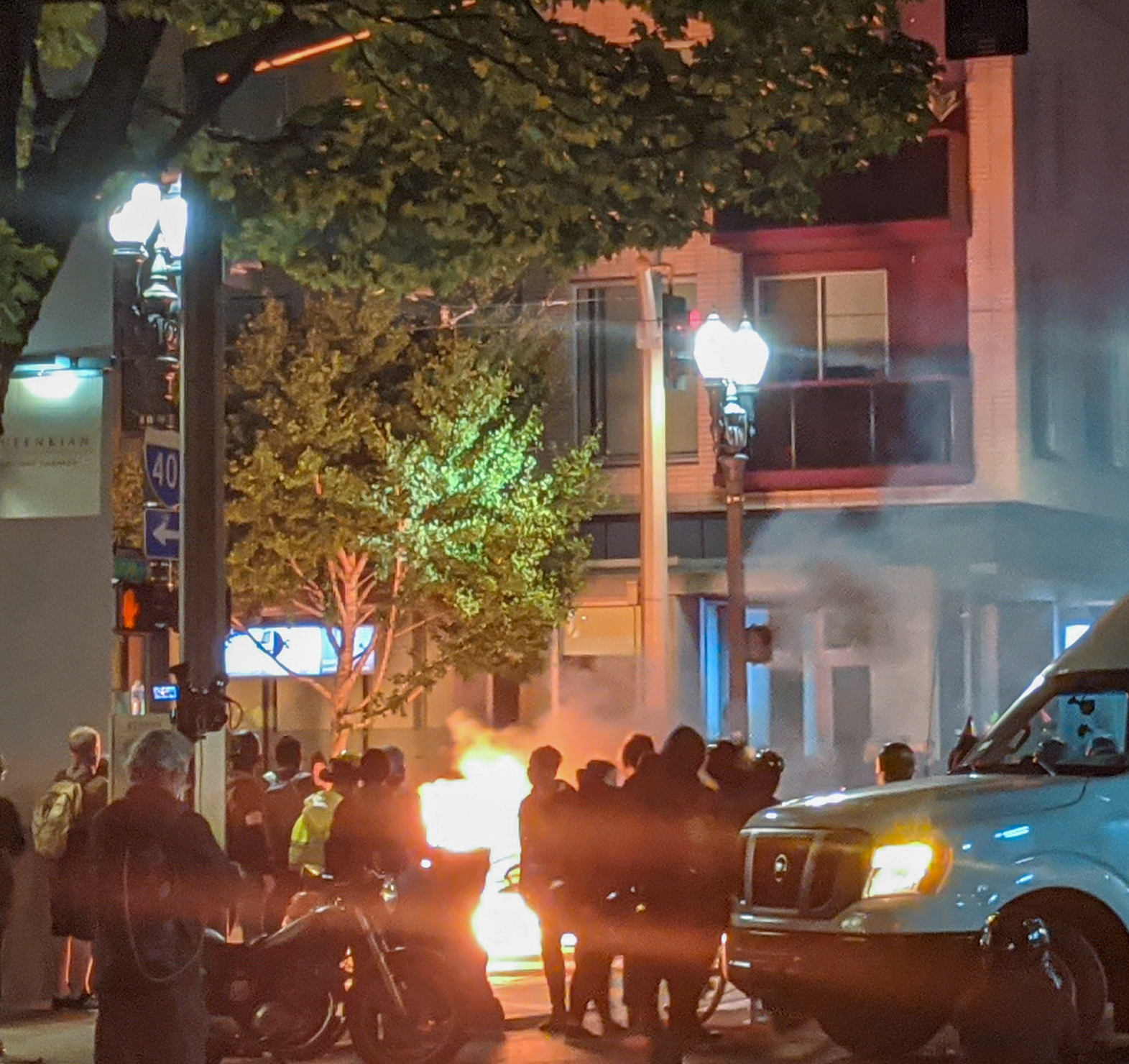
Protesters light a fire in front of Mayor Ted Wheeler's condo on August 31, 2020.

On August 31, protesters gathered outside Wheeler's condo, demanding that he resign. Police responded after the group lit fires, broke windows, and set a small fire in a nearby business. Police declared the assembly a riot after a fire was lit in the street. 19 protesters were arrested, mainly for disorderly conduct and interfering with a peace officer. On September 2 Wheeler said he was leaving his apartment building due to safety concerns posed by the ongoing protests; he apologized to fellow building residents "for the damage to our home and the fear that you are experiencing due to my position".

Throughout the protests, local activists called for Wheeler's resignation, for various reasons. Some believed that he had not spoken up strongly enough against excessive use of force against protesters; others were frustrated he had not done more to end the nightly demonstrations and the property damage, small fires and provocations of police that usually accompanied them; and some felt that he had not sufficiently handled issues such as the COVID-19 pandemic and related recession, homelessness, a lack of affordable housing, a spike in gun crime, race relations, and economic inequality. The Oregonian reported: "Critics and observers largely fault Wheeler not for what he's said or done as much as the tepid manner in which he's addressed key issues and the steps and stands he hasn't taken."

During the Portland foreclosure protest, Wheeler said, "There will be no autonomous zone in Portland."

By the end of 2020, the number of protest actions had dwindled, but those who remained were radicalized. On New Year's Day 2021, Wheeler—angered by repeated vandalism of downtown shops as well as violence on New Year's Eve (in which a few dozen shot fireworks at the Multnomah County Justice Center and smashed windows in downtown Portland)—vowed zero tolerance for criminal behavior by "violent antifa and anarchists ... rampaging through Portland" and called upon the Oregon Legislature to impose harsher sentencings for repeat offenses of vandalism and destruction. Wheeler said that his "good-faith efforts at deescalation have been met with scorn by antifa and anarchists bent on destruction"; said that the acts of those responsible were "height of selfishness"; and pledged that he would "push back harder" against violent agitators.

In March 2021, after marchers started to smash windows at night in the Pearl District, Portland police used kettling tactics to herd about 100 people onto a single, enclosed city block, and detained the crowd, stating that they were doing so due to suspicion of criminal conduct. Police ordered those detained to sit on the ground, required each one to identify themselves, and took photographs of each person. Police arrested those who refused to cooperate, and charges were brought against 13 people on various charges. Police reported seizing crowbars, knives, hammers, bear spray, and firearms from those detained. Wheeler strongly supported the police tactic as appropriate and lawful, and many Pearl District residents and business owners supported it. Conversely, the tactic was condemned by the American Civil Liberties Union and other groups as "aggressive and indiscriminate." In a heated exchange at a subsequent event, Wheeler rejected an attendee's defense of the vandalism as "protest" and rejected the attendee's demand for police defunding and Wheeler's resignation. Wheeler said, "I was elected through a democratic process and I still believe in democracy. I don’t believe in anarchy."

==== 2020 reelection ====
In the 2020 election, Wheeler won a second term, defeating Sarah Iannarone and various write-in candidates, including Teressa Raiford. It was the first time since 2000 that a Portland mayor had been reelected. Iannarone, an urban policy consultant and Portland State University employee, ran to Wheeler's left. Despite appearing politically vulnerable in the lead-up to the election, Wheeler won the support of the Portland Business Alliance, labor unions, and conservationist groups. He received 46.07% of the vote, Iannarone 40.76%, and various write-in candidates collectively 13.17%.

==== 2024 election ====
In September 2023, Wheeler announced he would not be seeking reelection in 2024.

== Political positions ==
=== Education ===
As treasurer, Wheeler relaunched the Oregon College Savings Program, which reached a record $2.3 billion in January 2015. The 529 savings plan allows money saved for college to grow tax-free and gives the donor a deduction on their taxable income. As mayor, Wheeler supported dissolving ACCESS Academy, an alternative program for gifted children not served by their neighborhood school due to disabilities or other challenges that prevented their learning.

=== Environmental issues ===
Wheeler is a proponent of increasing Oregon's investments in renewable energy funds. He commissioned a study to determine whether Oregon can replace fossil fuel companies in its fixed income portfolio. Wheeler does not support new coal investments. He supported the City of Portland's ban on expanding fossil fuel infrastructure.

In 2018, Wheeler opposed an initiative that would impose a 1% gross receipts tax on retailers with U.S. revenue over $1 billion and Portland revenue over $500,000, with an exemption for grocery and medicine companies, to provide revenue for a Clean Energy Fund. Wheeler argued that the proposal would be redundant to the statewide Energy Trust of Oregon. The measure passed by a wide margin.

=== Gun control ===
Wheeler advocates for increased gun control and supports requiring rigorous background checks for people attempting to buy guns. On March 14, 2018, he released a letter in support of The National School Walkout against gun violence. On April 20, Wheeler told hundreds of students outside Portland city hall that he would work on a ban of assault-style weapons in Portland.

=== LGBT rights ===
Wheeler and his ex-wife Katrina are involved with Basic Rights Oregon. Wheeler has been endorsed by the organization. He supports same-sex marriage and signed and supported the 2013 Oregon United for Marriage initiative, which advocated the legalization of same-sex marriage in Oregon.

=== Public safety ===
During his first three years as Mayor of Portland, Wheeler oversaw an increase of the police budget from $215 million to $242 million. He allows police to cover their name badges at protests. He supports abolition of a provision in the Portland Police Association's contract known as the "48-hour rule", which gives officers who have employed deadly force a 48-hour buffer before they have to answer questions.

=== Homelessness and housing ===
In November 2017, Wheeler met with other city leaders and local business owners several times to discuss shared security concerns. The meetings were by invitation only and moderated by the Portland Business Alliance. They resulted in Wheeler advocating "no sit zones" in downtown Portland, which was criticized by the Oregon ACLU and other social justice advocates and praised by the Portland Business Alliance. Protesters organized a sit-in to oppose the city policy with signs that read "Mayor for Sale".

In 2024, Wheeler announced a draft plan to address homelessness and said he would try to ban daytime homeless camping.

== Personal life ==
Wheeler lived in Southwest Portland with his wife and daughter. After his divorce, he moved into an apartment in Northwest Portland. An Eagle Scout and avid outdoorsman, he summited Mount Everest in 2002.

Wheeler is Episcopalian and occasionally attends services at Trinity Episcopal Cathedral.

On January 24, 2021, during the COVID-19 pandemic, Wheeler pepper-sprayed a man who confronted him and former mayor Sam Adams as they left a bar in Southwest Portland. The man, identified by police as Cary Cadonau, a Alpenrose Dairy heir and Portland lawyer, was not wearing a mask and shouted at the mayor from less than 2 feet (0.61 m) away; after he refused to back off when asked to do so, Wheeler pepper-sprayed him.

== Electoral history ==
Oregon Treasurer Special Democratic Primary Election, 2010
Party	Candidate	Votes	%
Democratic	Ted Wheeler (incumbent)	216,214	64.91
Democratic	Rick Metsger	114,597	34.40
Democratic	Write-ins	2,273	0.68

Oregon Treasurer Special Election, 2010
Party	Candidate	Votes	%
Democratic	Ted Wheeler (incumbent)	721,795	52.94
Republican	Chris Telfer	571,105	41.89
Progressive	Walter "Walt" Brown	38,316	2.81
Constitution	Michael Marsh	30,489	2.24
Write-ins	Write-ins	1,738	0.13

Oregon Treasurer Election, 2012
Party	Candidate	Votes	%
Democratic	Ted Wheeler (incumbent)	955,213	57.84
Republican	Tom Cox	609,989	36.93
Progressive	Cameron Whitten	38,762	2.35
Libertarian	John Mahler	30,002	1.82
Constitution	Michael Paul Marsh	15,415	0.93
Write-ins	Write-ins	2,181	0.13

Portland, Oregon Mayoral Primary Election, 2016
Candidate	Votes	%
Ted Wheeler	105,562	54.67
Jules Bailey	31,955	16.55
Sarah Iannarone	22,831	11.82
Bruce Broussard	7,465	3.69
Sean Davis	5,217	2.70
David Schor	5,083	2.63
Jessie Sponberg	3,235	1.68
Bim Ditson	2,467	1.28
Patty Burkett	2,346	1.22
David Ackerman	2,255	1.17
Deborah Harris	1,636	0.85
Lew Humble	748	0.39
Trevor Manning	480	0.25
Steven J. Entwisle Sr.	405	0.21
Eric Calhoun	358	0.19
Write-ins	1,040	0.54

== See also ==
- List of mayors of the 50 largest cities in the United States

Political offices
Preceded by Ben Westlund	Treasurer of Oregon; 2010–2017	Succeeded by Tobias Read
Preceded by Charlie Hales	Mayor of Portland; 2017–2025	Succeeded by Keith Wilson
