= Demetria Hester =

American Black activist, civil rights activist, speaker, and hate crime survivor

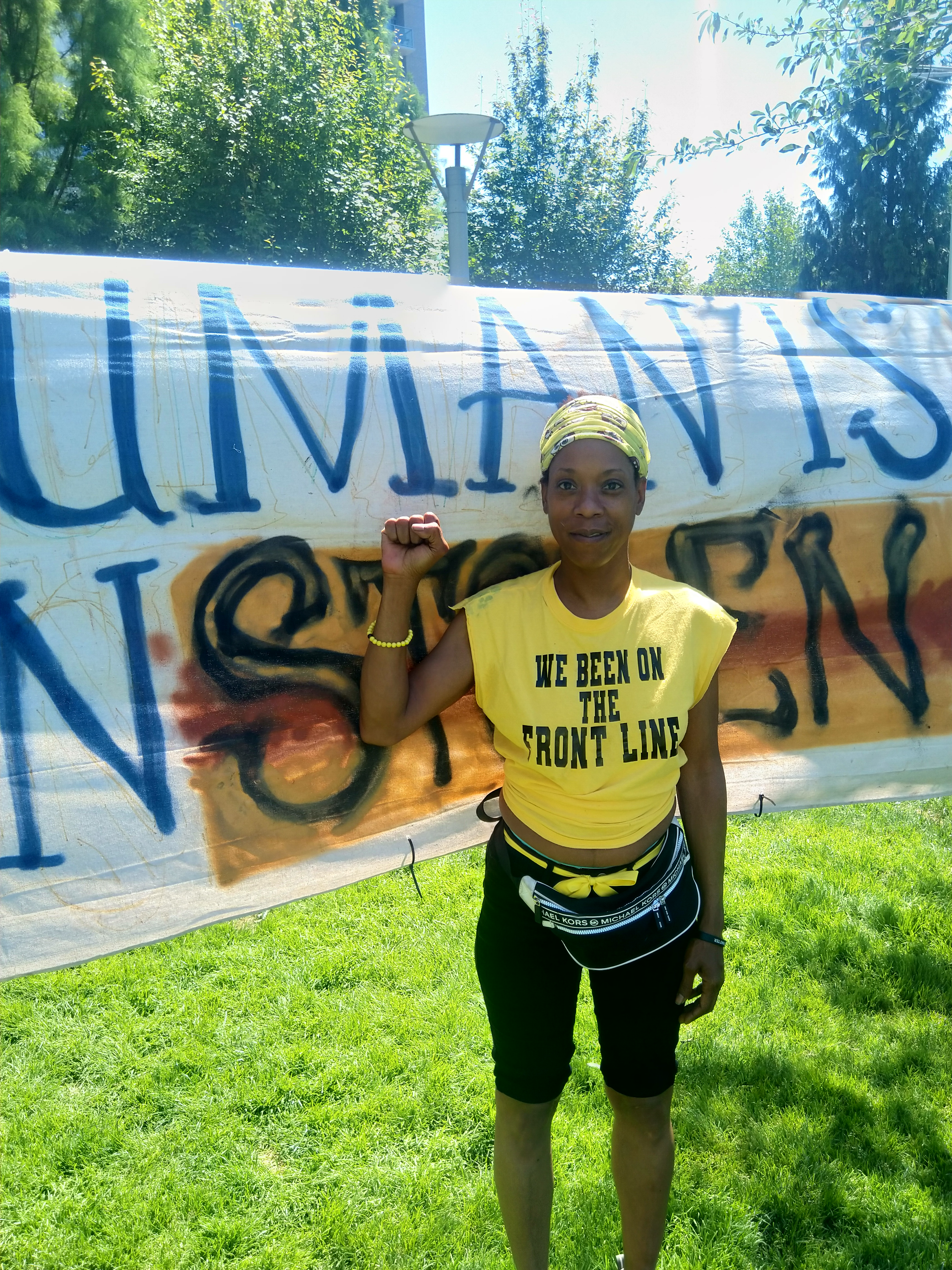
Demetria Hester in June 2021

Demetria Hester (born November 30, 1974) is a Black activist, speaker, and hate crime survivor based in Portland, Oregon. She is a frequent organizer of and speaker at Portland's George Floyd protests, Black Lives Matter rallies, and vigils for victims of police violence.

== Early life and education ==
Demetria Hester moved from Tennessee to the Pacific Northwest searching for a fresh start for herself and her two children. She first moved to the state of Washington, then to Portland, Oregon in 2014. She worked at a restaurant, studied at the Art Institute of Portland and become a sous chef. Hester is fond of the cartoon character SpongeBob SquarePants.

== Surviving a racist attack ==
Hester survived a verbal and physical assault by white supremacist and murderer Jeremy Joseph Christian on May 25, 2017, while waiting for the light-rail train in Portland. Hester claims police did not take her seriously when they responded to the incident. The next day, Christian fatally stabbed two men and injured a third on a different train in what is known as the 2017 Portland train attack. Hester testified against Christian at his trial.

== Activism and arrest ==
Hester became a visible leader during the 2020 summer-long George Floyd Protests, and is a founder and lead organizer of Moms United for Black Lives, a group that participates in protests to end police violence against Black people. This group is led by a collective of Black women, including Don't Shoot Portland’s founder Teressa Raiford and Danialle James.

Hester was arrested at the George Floyd Protests on August 10, 2020, booked on suspicion of disorderly conduct and interfering with a police officer, and held in the Multnomah County Jail. Later, Multnomah County District Attorney Mike Schmidt declined to prosecute Hester and other protesters who were charged with small nonviolent offenses. All charges were dropped.

Hester led a group from Moms United for Black Lives to Washington, D.C., on January 20, 2020, for Martin Luther King Day, an occasion which she called a "beautiful and epic moment in history."
