= Nicole Morrisey O'Donnell =

American law enforcement officer

41st Sheriff of Multnomah County
- Incumbent
- Assumed office January 4, 2023
- Preceded by: Mike Reese

Undersheriff of Multnomah County
- In office August, 2022 – January 4, 2023

Personal details
- Education: University of Portland

Nicole Morrisey O’Donnell is an American law enforcement officer who currently serves as the 41st Sheriff of Multnomah County, Oregon, the county where Portland is located. She is the first woman to serve as sheriff in the county's history.

== Career ==
Morrisey O'Donnell attended the University of Portland. She started at the Sheriff's office in 1996 as a Deputy, before being promoted to lieutenant, captain, chief deputy, and undersheriff. She ran for Sheriff in 2022, facing Captain Derrick Peterson and Corrections Deputy Nicholas Alberts, both employees of the Sheriff's Office. On May 17, 2022 Morrisey O'Donnell was elected with 62% of the vote.

=== Multnomah County Sheriff ===
Morrisey-O'Donnel was sworn in as Sheriff on January 4, 2023, becoming the first woman to hold the position in the county's history.

In August 2023, Morrisey-O'Donnel issued a directive clarifying that the county jail would only book suspects accused of felony and misdemeanor offenses, not those violating city ordinances. In late July 2024, when Portland Police made the first arrest under a policy restricting times and places where homeless residents could camp on public property, the sheriff's office declined to book the suspect pursuant to this directive. After criticism from Mayor Wheeler, Morrisey-O'Donnel defended the policy arguing that the corrections system should be used for individuals who pose a genuine danger to the public. On August 20, 2024, Morrisey-O'Donnel agreed to begin booking people accused of violating the ordinance for a 120 day trial period while evaluating the effectiveness and sustainability of the new approach.

== Personal life ==
Morrisey O'Donnell lives in Portland with her husband. She is a long-time supporter of Special Olympics Oregon.

She cites her father's near-death experience during an armed robbery as a primary reason for her choice to become a law enforcement officer.

== Electoral history ==
2022 Multnomah County Sheriff Election
Party	Candidate	Votes	%
Nonpartisan	Nicole Morrisey O'Donnell	110,796	61.7
Nonpartisan	Derrick Peterson	60,561	33.7
Nonpartisan	Nicholas Alberts	7,487	4.2
Write-in		794	0.4
Total votes		179,638	100%
