= Jessica Vega Pederson =

American politician (born 1975)

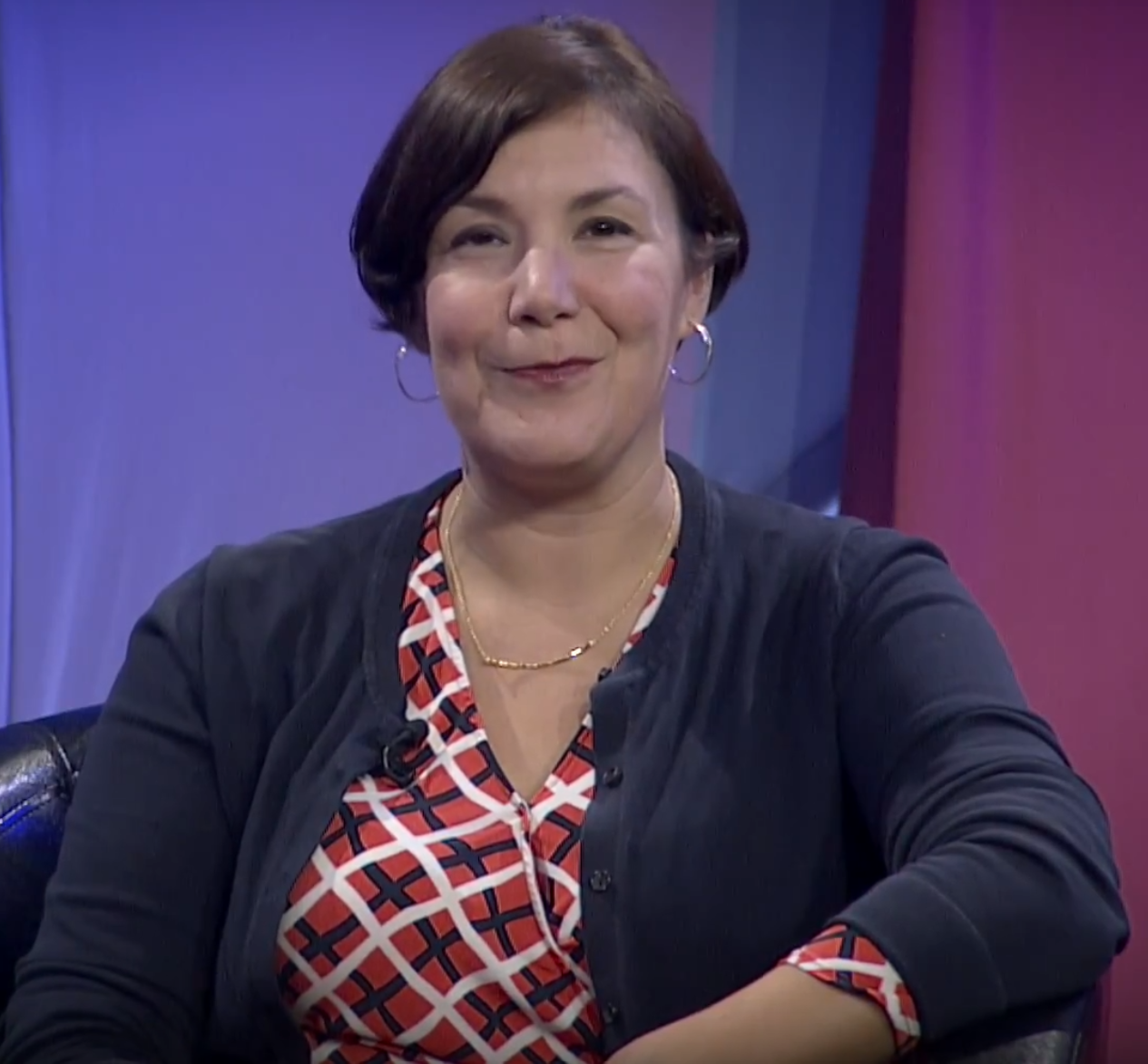

Chair of the Multnomah County Board of Commissioners
- Incumbent
- Assumed office January 1, 2023
- Preceded by: Deborah Kafoury

Member of the Multnomah County Board of Commissioners from the 3rd district
- In office January 1, 2017 – December 31, 2022
- Preceded by: Judy Shiprack
- Succeeded by: Diane Rosenbaum

Member of the Oregon House of Representatives from the 47th district
- In office January 14, 2013 – January 3, 2017
- Preceded by: Jefferson Smith
- Succeeded by: Diego Hernandez

Personal details
- Born: 1975 (age 50–51) Crown Point, Indiana, U.S.
- Party: Democratic
- Education: Loyola University Chicago (BA)

Jessica Vega Pederson is a Democratic politician in the U.S. state of Oregon. She served in the Oregon House of Representatives, for two two-year terms, from January 2013 through 2016. From 2017 to 2022, Vega Pederson served as a county commissioner for Multnomah County, the state's most populous county. In 2022, Vega Pederson was elected to serve as county chair, and took office in 2023.

== Early life and education ==
Vega Pederson was born in Crown Point, Indiana, a small town near Chicago, and raised in a Mexican-American family. Vega Pederson graduated from Loyola University Chicago, where she majored in informational systems management and technology.

== Career ==
Prior to running for political office, Vega Pederson was a project manager for a tech company. Her listing within the Voter's Pamphlet read: "I am not a politician. I'm a mom and a professional. My husband has his own small business. We work hard and we want a better future for our kids." She and her husband have two small children and live in East Portland.

In November 2013, she was elected to the Oregon House of Representatives, for District 47, for a two-year term starting in January 2013. She was re-elected two years later.

In September 2015, Vega Pederson announced that she would not seek re-election to the House, and would instead run for election to the Multnomah County Commission, for a seat that was due to become open as a result of term limits requiring its then-holder Judy Shiprack to leave the seat. She won election to the commission in the May 2016 primary, representing county District 3, for a four-year term to begin in January 2017. She was sworn in on January 3, 2017. On May 19, 2020, Jessica Vega Pederson was re-elected to a four-year term on the Multnomah County Board of Commissioners. On November 8, 2022, Vega Pederson was elected Multnomah County Chair, defeating fellow commissioners Lori Stegmann (in the primary) and Sharon Meieran (in the general election), for a four-year term to begin in January 2023.

Pederson made her residency in far East Portland a part of her political appeal, however she moved to a $1.2 million, 5 bedroom house in Southwest Portland in April 2024.

In October 2024, it was reported that Pederson had a 11% approval rating.

In February 2025, Pederson publicly announced a $104 million shortfall in homeless services funding before she had notified notify fellow Multnomah County Commissioners, Portland City Council, Metro, and Governor Tina Kotek, resulting in calls by public officials to audit homeless services.

== Electoral history ==
2022 Multnomah County Commission Chair election
Party	Candidate	Votes	%
Nonpartisan	Jessica Vega Pederson	164,914	54.03%
Nonpartisan	Sharon Meieran	138,034	45.23%
Other	Write-ins	2,263	0.74%
Total votes		305,211	100.00%

2022 Primary for Multnomah County Commission Chair
Party	Candidate	Votes	%
Nonpartisan	Jessica Vega Pederson	77,529	41.95%
Nonpartisan	Sharon Meieran	33,651	18.21%
Nonpartisan	Sharia Mayfield	27,713	14.99%
Nonpartisan	Lori Stegmann	23,210	12.56%
Nonpartisan	Bruce Broussard	12,895	6.98%
Nonpartisan	Joe Demers	9,544	5.16%
Other	Write-ins	290	0.16%
Total votes		184,832	100.00%

2020 Primary for Multnomah County Commission District 3
Party	Candidate	Votes	%
Nonpartisan	Jessica Vega Pederson	37,244	98.42%
Other	Write-ins	596	1.58%
Total votes		37,840	100.00%

2016 Primary for Multnomah County Commission District 3
Party	Candidate	Votes	%
Nonpartisan	Jessica Vega Pederson	29,986	97.96%
Other	Write-ins	623	2.04%
Total votes		30,609	100.00%

2014 Oregon State Representative, 47th district
Party	Candidate	Votes	%
Democratic	Jessica Vega Pederson	10,379	95.4
Write-in		505	4.6
Total votes		10,884	100%

2012 Oregon State Representative, 47th district
Party	Candidate	Votes	%
Democratic	Jessica Vega Pederson	12,662	64.8
Republican	Maggie Nelson	6,773	34.7
Write-in		93	0.5
Total votes		19,528	100%
