= Wall of Moms =

2020s US protest movement

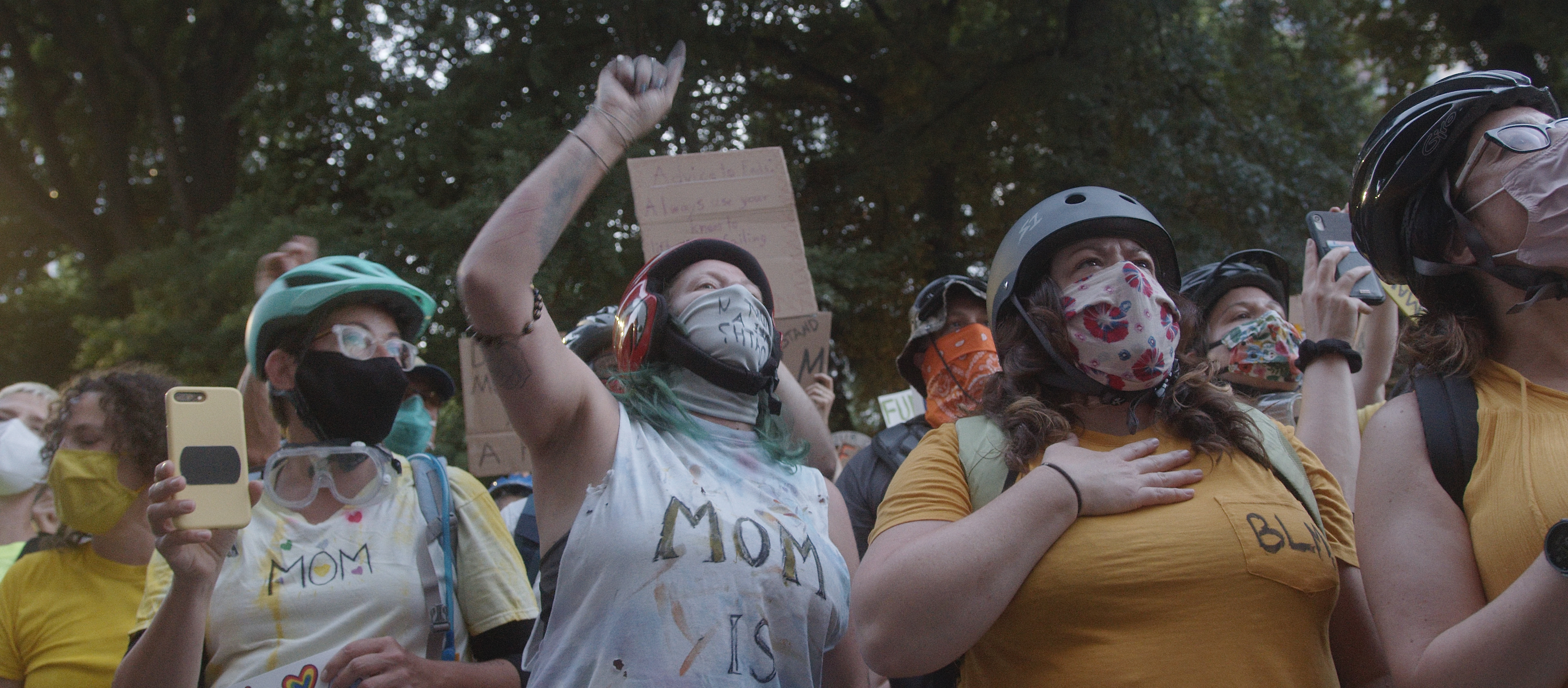
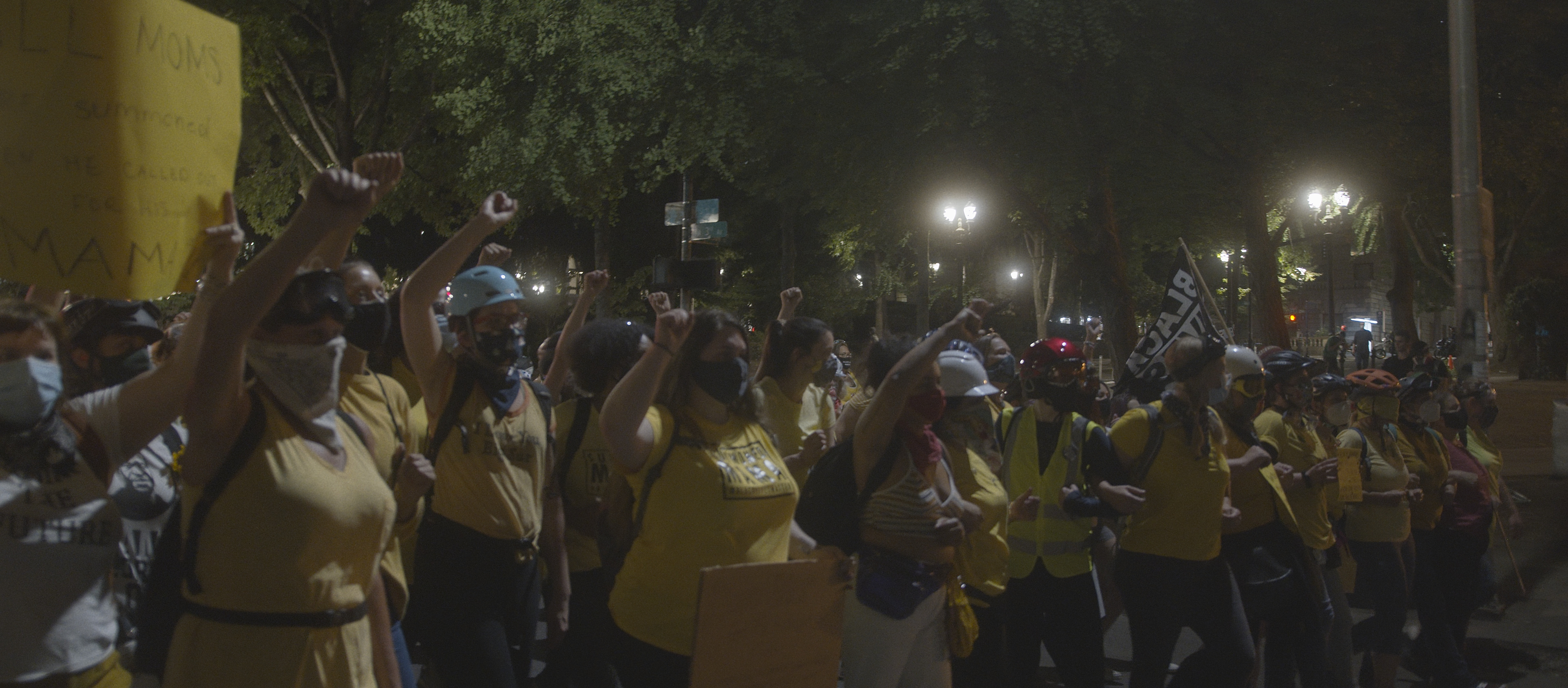
Wall of Moms in Portland, Oregon, July 24, 2020

The Wall of Moms is a group primarily made up of women who identify as mothers, who have demonstrated in George Floyd protests in Portland, Oregon, as well as other groups in U.S. cities including Chicago, Seattle, and Tampa, Florida. The group's first protest was attended by approximately 40 women; hundreds to thousands have participated since then.

== Background ==
Mothers, wives, and other female relatives have come together to protest state-sponsored violence and politicized police actions in multiple countries, including Argentina (Mothers of the Plaza de Mayo, Grandmothers of the Plaza de Mayo), China (Tiananmen Mothers), Cuba (Ladies in White), Iran (Mourning Mothers, Mothers of Khavaran), Mexico (mothers of the disappeared), Russia (Union of the Committees of Soldiers' Mothers of Russia), Sri Lanka (mothers of the disappeared), and Turkey (Saturday Mothers).

== Description and membership ==
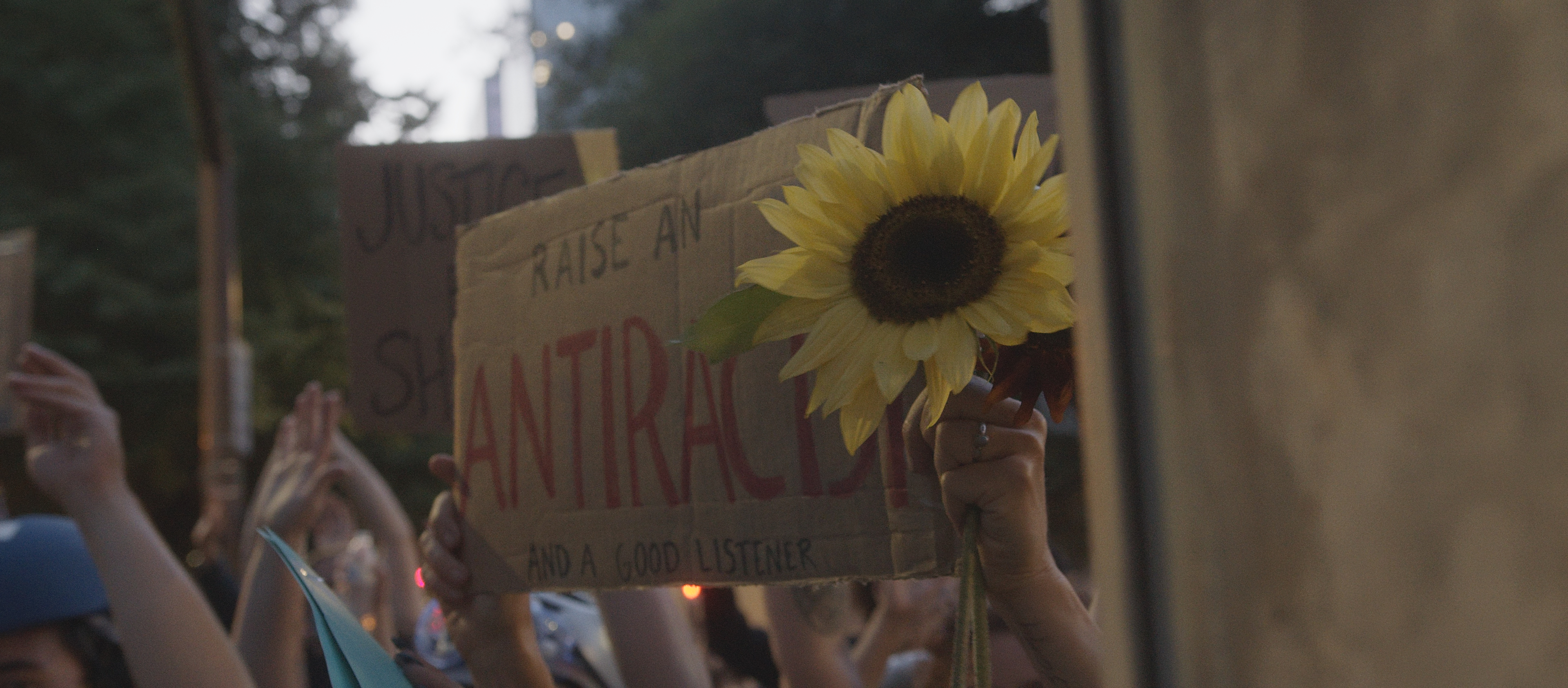
A demonstrator in Portland, Oregon, carrying a sunflower, July 24, 2020

Portland's Wall of Moms has been described by some journalists as "a group of mainly white, suburban mothers", but also "includes those who are nonbinary and people who consider themselves mothers". Participants gained national attention for locking arms and chanting during local George Floyd protests. NPR's Danielle Kurtzleben says the group demonstrates "the power of moms as activists". The mothers are known for wearing yellow and acting as a barrier between federal agents and other demonstrators. The Catholic Sentinel and National Catholic Reporter have noted the participation by local Catholics.

Affectionate nicknames for the group include "MomBloc" and "Momtifa". Some participants also carry sunflowers.

Bev Barnum has been credited for creating the Facebook event for the initial protest. The private Facebook group has approximately 17,000 members, as of July 26, 2020.

== Reactions ==
On July 26, President Donald Trump tweeted, "The line of innocent 'mothers' were a scam that Lamestream refuses to acknowledge, just like they don't report the violence of these demonstrations!"

Raffi released "Portland Moms" as a protest song in support of the Black Lives Matter movement and Wall of Moms, set to the tune of "Buffalo Gals". He recorded the song with singer Lindsay Munroe and dobro player Ivan Rosenberg, after the idea struck him at 3am. According to Willamette Week's Matthew Singer, "It's a short, simple folk jam, shouting out Black Lives Matter and the Wall of Vets in addition to the song's namesake, with a refrain nodding the nightly protests downtown."

The BBC called the Wall of Moms "a good example of mainly middle-class, middle-aged white women explicitly not being Karens. Instead, the Wall of Moms are seen by activists as using their privilege to protest against the very same systemic racism and classism that Karens actively seek to exploit."

=== Similar groups ===
The group inspired participation by similar groups such as "walls" of fathers (such as "DadBloc" or "PDX Dad Pod", a tongue-in-cheek reference to Dad bod, most known for wielding leaf blowers and wearing orange construction vests), ChefBloc (with pizza boxes), lawyers (Lawyers for Black Lives, in suits), nurses (in scrubs), teachers (Teachers Against Tyrants, in red or green shirts), and veterans (Wall of Vets).

== Lawsuit ==
On July 27, 2020, the nonprofit organization Protect Democracy and Perkins Coie filed a lawsuit in Washington, D.C., on behalf of Wall of Moms, Don't Shoot Portland, and several individual protesters against the Department of Homeland Security, Customs and Border Protection, Immigration and Customs Enforcement, the U.S. Marshals Service, the Federal Protective Service, the Department of Justice, and the heads of these federal agencies. Don't Shoot Portland and the Wall of Moms coordinated efforts during the protests, and the suit alleges that the defendants "violated [plaintiffs'] constitutional rights, went beyond legal authority and were directed by someone not formally confirmed in their role". The suit also seeks to limit federal law enforcement to protecting federal property and to bar them from using specific actions, such as excessive crowd-control measures and custodial detentions without probable cause. On November 15, 2021, the parties agreed to resolve the case without further legal proceedings and the court dismissed it with prejudice.

== See also ==
- Moms United for Black Lives
- Raging Grannies
