= 2020 Portland, Oregon, mayoral election =

- May 19, 2020 (first round); November 3, 2020 (runoff)
- Turnout: 49.64% ▼13.60 pp (first round); 79.47% ▲29.83 pp (runoff)
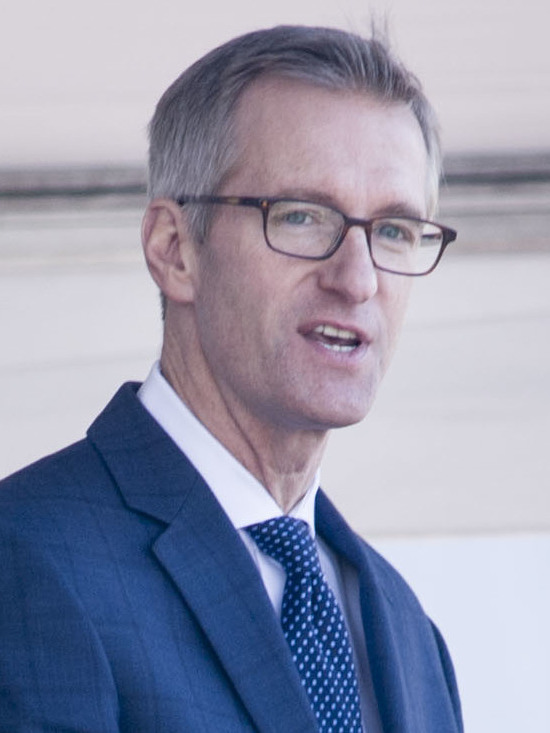

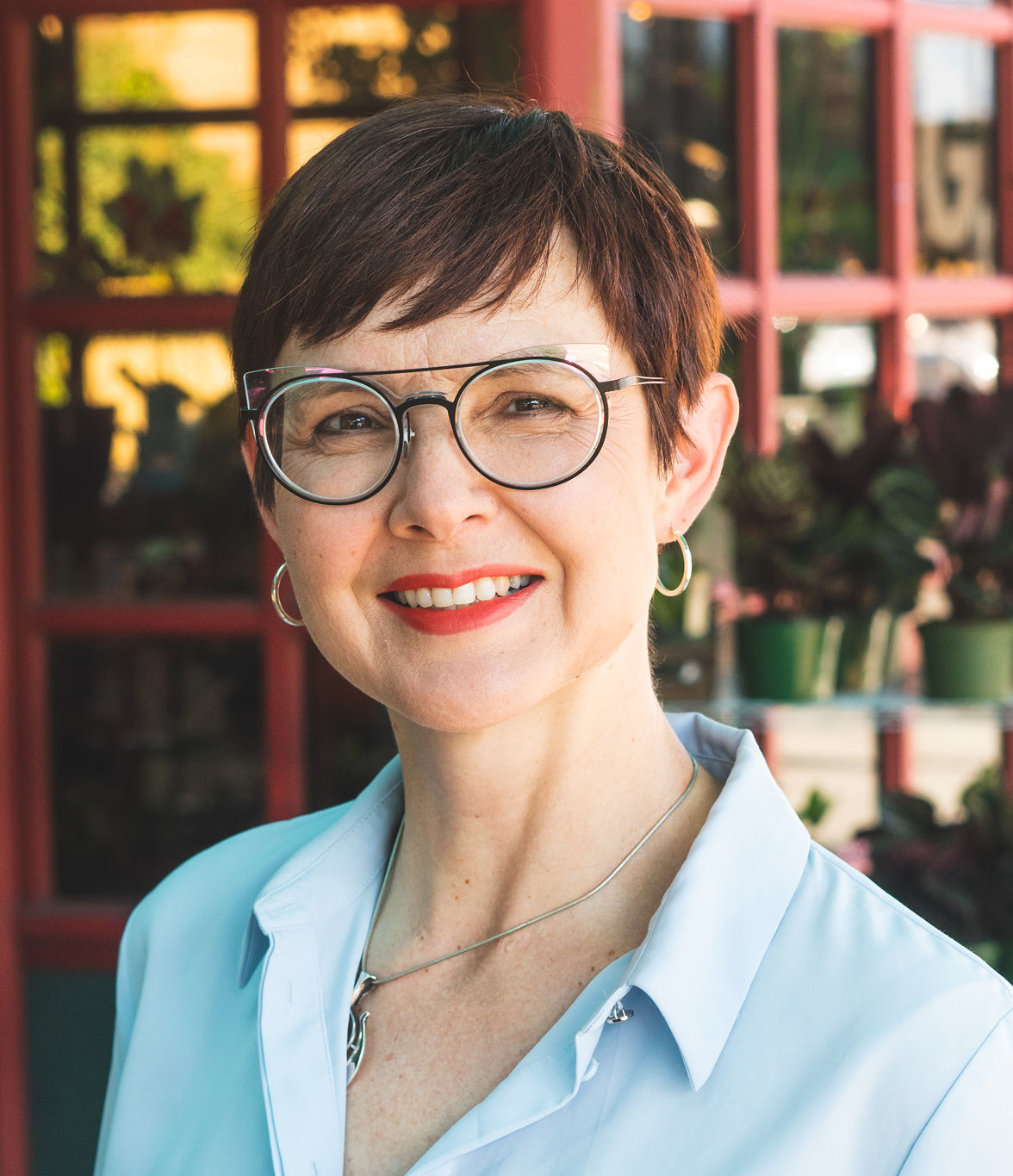

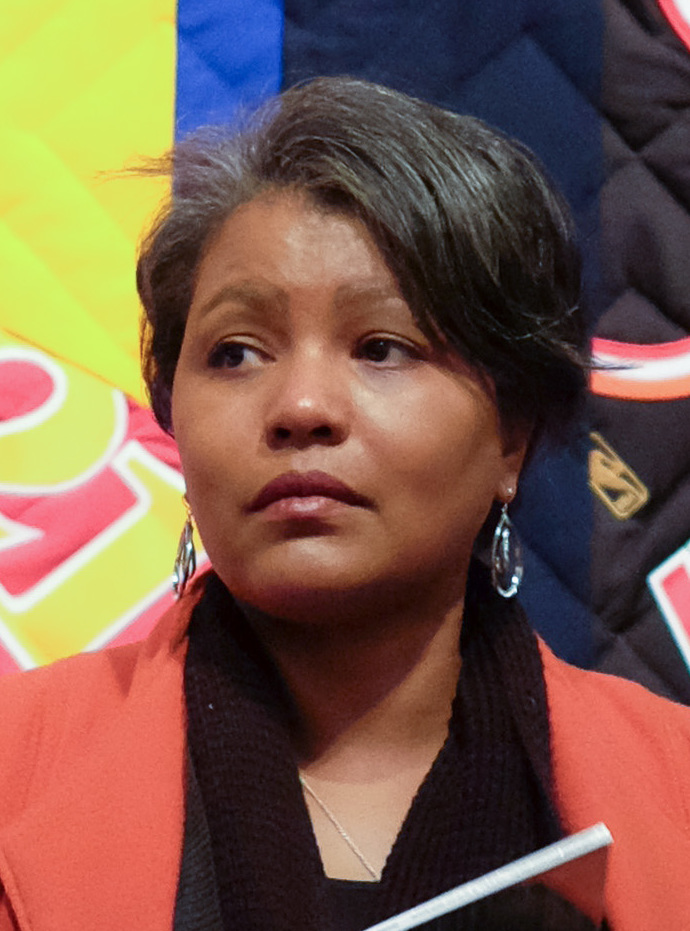

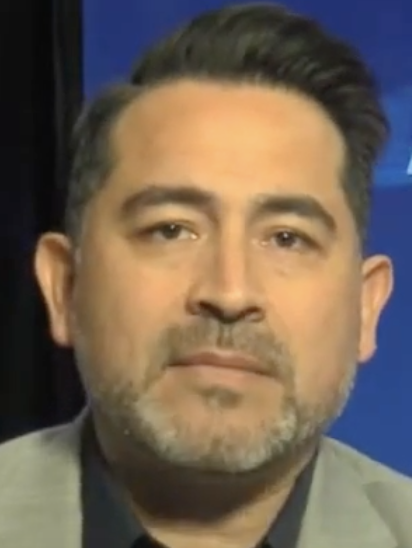

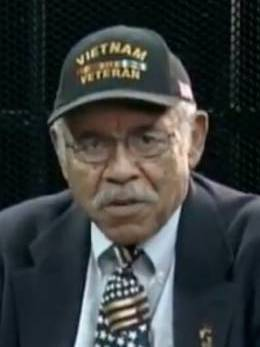
Candidate	Ted Wheeler	Sarah Iannarone	Teressa Raiford
First round	107,241; 49.29%	51,849; 23.82%	18,310; 8.40%
Runoff	163,564; 46.20%	144,326; 40.77%
Candidate	Ozzie González	Bruce Broussard
First round	12,632; 5.80%	11,336; 5.20%
Results of the final round by precinct. Blue denotes precincts won by Wheeler, red denotes precincts won by Iannarone.
Wheeler
40–50%
50–60%
60–70%
70–80%
Iannarone
40–50%
50–60%
Mayor before election
Ted Wheeler
Elected mayor
Ted Wheeler

On May 19, 2020, and November 3, 2020, elections were held in Portland, Oregon, to elect the mayor.

In Portland local elections, all voters are eligible to participate. All candidates are listed on the ballot without any political party affiliation. All candidates meeting the qualifications competed in a blanket primary election on Tuesday, May 19, 2020. As no candidate received an absolute majority, a runoff election between the top two candidates was scheduled for Tuesday, November 3, 2020. Voters could also choose to write-in candidates.

In the general election, Portland voters also elected members of their City Commission and voted on local ballot initiatives.

== Candidates ==
=== Candidates who advanced to runoff ===
Candidate	Experience	Announced	References
The following candidates advanced to the runoff election on April 2
Ted Wheeler	53rd Mayor of Portland, Oregon; Former Oregon State Treasurer	October 14, 2019	
Sarah Iannarone	Community Activist; Urban Policy Consultant	July 9, 2019	

=== Candidates eliminated in the first round ===
Candidate	Experience	Announced	References
The following candidates were eliminated in the first round and did not advance to the runoff election
Teressa Raiford	Founder of Don't Shoot Portland	December 3, 2017	
Bruce Broussard	Host of Oregon Voter Digest on PBS	November 13, 2018	
Ozzie Gonzalez	Architect and Sustainability Consultant	December 12, 2019	
Piper Crowell	Director of Global Digital and Innovation Policy at Nike, Inc.	February 12, 2020; Suspended campaign March 25, 2020	
Randy Rapaport	Real Estate Developer; Educational Psychologist	March 10, 2020	
Mark White	Co-chair of the Portland City Charter Commission	January 30, 2020	
Cash Carter	Former Portland Timbers team chef	November 18, 2019	

==== Candidates who received fewer than 1,000 votes ====
- Willie Banks, community advocate
- Jarred Bepristis, bartender
- Daniel Hoffman, homeless rights activist
- Lew Humble, retired mechanic, perennial candidate
- Michael Jenkins, cannabis grower
- Sharon Joy, retired community advocate
- Floyd LaBar, yoga teacher
- Beryl McNair, retired Federal government employee, candidate for Portland Mayor in 2008
- Michael O'Callaghan, homeless rights activist and candidate for Alaska governor in 1990
- Mark White, program manager
- Michael Burleson, community leader, activist, attorney at law (Suspended)

=== Declined to run ===
- Diego Hernandez, representative for Oregon's 47th House district
- Jessica Vega Pederson, Multnomah County commissioner

== Endorsements ==
Ted Wheeler

Organizations

- Basic Rights Oregon
- Northwest Oregon Labor Council
- UFCW Local 555

Newspapers

- Willamette Week
Sarah Iannarone

National

- Bernie Sanders, US Senator from Vermont

Local

- Karin Power, State Representative for District 41
- Jo Ann Hardesty, Portland City Commissioner
- Bruce Broussard, former candidate for Portland mayor

Newspapers

- Portland Mercury

Organizations

- Basic Rights Oregon
- Oregon Progressive Party
- Our Revolution
- Gravel Institute
Ozzie González

Organizations

- Basic Rights Oregon

== Polling ==
=== Runoff ===
View source data.

Poll source	Date(s) administered	Sample size (Note: Key: A – all adults RV – registered voters LV – likely voters V – unclear)	Margin of error	Ted Wheeler	Sarah Iannarone	Write In	Undecided
DHM Research/OPB	October 7–11, 2020	400 (LV)	±4.9%	33%	34%	6%	28%
DHM Research/Portland Business Alliance (Note: The Portland Business Alliance endorsed Wheeler prior to this poll's sampling period)	September 17–22, 2020	– (LV) (Note: Not yet released)	±4%	30%	41%	16%	13%
Public Policy Polling	June 17–18, 2020	992 (V)	±3.1%	33%	32%	–	35%

== Debates ==
=== Primary ===
2020 Portland, Oregon mayoral election primary debate
No.	Date	Host	Moderator	Link	Nonpartisan	Nonpartisan	Nonpartisan	Nonpartisan
Key: P Participant A Absent N Not invited I Invited W Withdrawn								
Key: P Participant A Absent N Not invited I Invited W Withdrawn					Ozzie González	Sarah Iannarone	Teressa Raiford	Ted Wheeler
1	Mar. 30, 2020	City Club of Portland	Serilda Summers-McGee	YouTube	P	P	P	P

=== Runoff ===
2020 Portland, Oregon mayoral election runoff debate
No.	Date	Host	Moderator	Link	Nonpartisan	Nonpartisan
Key: P Participant A Absent N Not invited I Invited W Withdrawn						
Key: P Participant A Absent N Not invited I Invited W Withdrawn					Ted Wheeler	Sarah Iannarone
1	Oct. 15, 2020	City Club of Portland	Dana Haynes	YouTube	P	P

== Results ==
=== Primary ===
Portland mayoral primary election, 2020
Party	Candidate	Votes	%
Nonpartisan	Ted Wheeler (incumbent)	107,241	49.29%
Nonpartisan	Sarah Iannarone	51,849	23.82%
Nonpartisan	Teressa Raiford	18,310	8.40%
Nonpartisan	Ozzie González	12,632	5.80%
Nonpartisan	Bruce Broussard	11,336	5.20%
Nonpartisan	Randy Rapaport	3,816	1.75%
Nonpartisan	Piper Crowell	3,272	1.50%
Nonpartisan	Mark White	2,308	1.06%
Nonpartisan	Cash Carter	1,488	0.68%
Nonpartisan	Sharon Joy	901	0.42%
Nonpartisan	Willie Banks	789	0.36%
Nonpartisan	Daniel Hoffman	702	0.32%
Nonpartisan	Michael O'Callaghan	629	0.29%
Nonpartisan	Michael Burleson	406	0.19%
Nonpartisan	Lew Humble	299	0.14%
Nonpartisan	Michael Jenkins	262	0.12%
Nonpartisan	Beryl McNair	259	0.12%
Nonpartisan	Jarred Bepristis	105	0.05%
Nonpartisan	Floyd LaBar	95	0.04%
Write-in		861	0.40%
Total votes		217,560	100.00%

=== Runoff ===
Since no candidate received a simple majority (50% plus one) vote in the primary election, the two candidates who received the most votes (Wheeler and Iannarone) ran again in the general election on November 3, 2020. Iannarone, who had finished third in the 2016 mayoral election, was campaigning on a progressive platform emphasizing urbanism and taking a stronger stand against police violence.

The police murder of George Floyd and resulting protests occurred only two weeks after the first round of the mayoral election, and led to significant protest activity in Portland that continued throughout 2020. These events led supporters of third-place candidate Teressa Raiford to begin mounting a write-in campaign on her behalf, arguing that she more authentically represented the energy of the street protests.

Wheeler won the election, becoming Portland's first mayor to win a second consecutive term since Vera Katz left office in 2005. Ultimately, almost 48,000 write-in votes were cast in the election, far exceeding Wheeler's approximately 20,000-vote margin of victory.

Portland mayoral general election, 2020
Party	Candidate	Votes	%
Nonpartisan	Ted Wheeler (incumbent)	167,260	46.07%
Nonpartisan	Sarah Iannarone	147,964	40.76%
Write-in		47,832	13.17%
Total votes		363,056	100.00%
