= Mike Reese (police officer) =

American law enforcement officer

Michael Reese
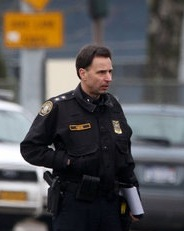
- Reese in 2012

Director of the Oregon Department of Corrections
- Incumbent
- Assumed office November 2023
- Preceded by: Colette Peters

40th Sheriff of Multnomah County
- In office May 2016 – December 2022
- Preceded by: Nicole Morrisey O’Donnell

Chief of the Portland Police Bureau
- In office May 12, 2010 – January 2, 2015
- Preceded by: Rosie Sizer
- Succeeded by: Larry O'Dea

Personal details
- Born: Portland, Oregon
- Spouse: Married
- Children: 3
- Education: Portland State University (BS, MPA)

Michael Reese is an American law enforcement officer who currently serves as Director of the Oregon Department of Corrections. He previously served as the 40th sheriff of Multnomah County, Oregon (2016–2022), and Chief of the Portland Police Bureau.

== Early life and education ==
Reese was born in Portland, Oregon and attended Roosevelt High School in North Portland. He went to Mt. Hood Community College and Portland State University where he received his BS in Psychology and his Masters of Public Administration.

== Career ==
Reese started his career in 1989 as a deputy sheriff with the Multnomah County Sheriff's Office. He transferred to the Portland Police Bureau in 1994, serving as an officer, sergeant, lieutenant, captain, commander and ultimately chief of police, retiring in 2015. He served as interim director of the Citizen's Crime Commission before being appointed to finish former Sheriff Dan Staton's term in May 2016 (Staton retired amid a scandal).

In 2018, Reese ran unopposed in the sheriff's election, except for a write-in campaign by Teressa Raiford, and received 96.55% of the vote. Reese did not run for re-election in 2022 due to term limits.

In 2023, Reese was appointed as Director of the Oregon Department of Corrections.

=== Donald Trump comments ===
In the November 2020 US Presidential debate, Donald Trump claimed to have the support and endorsement from the "Portland sheriff". Reese quickly responded via a tweet stating that he has never supported Trump.

== Electoral history ==
Multnomah County Sheriff Election, 2018
Party	Candidate	Votes	%
Nonpartisan	Mike Reese (Incumbent)	88,146	96.55%
Nonpartisan	Teressa Raiford (Write-in)	3,000	3.28%
	write-ins	150	0.16%
Total votes		60,422	100%
