= Teressa Raiford =

American activist and politician

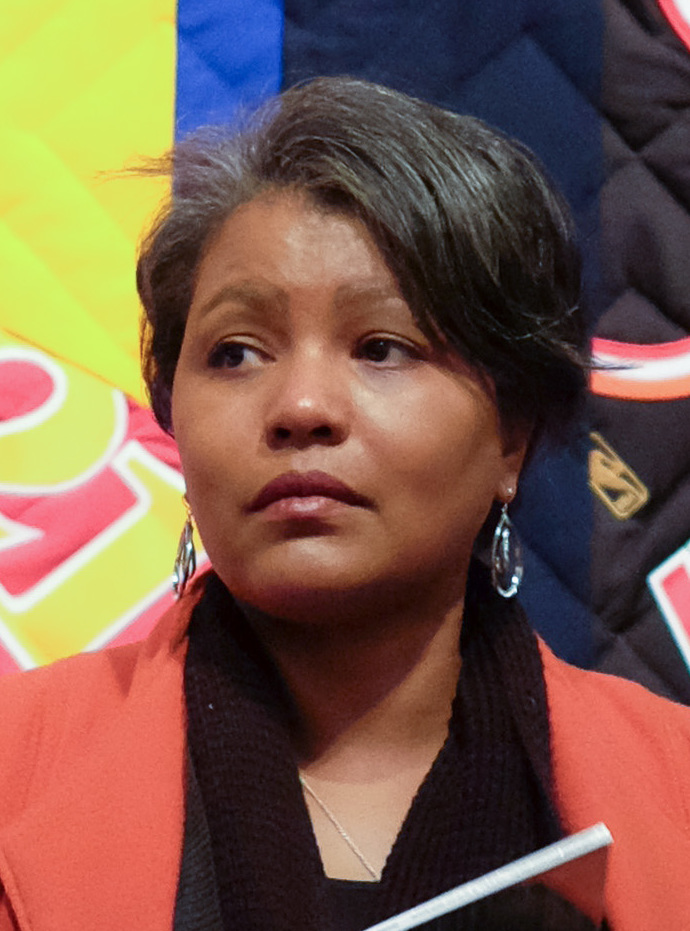
- Raiford's official 2020 campaign portrait
- Born: Teressa Raiford; 1970 (age 55–56); Portland, Oregon, U.S.
- Occupations: Activist, community organizer, former political candidate
- Organization: Don't Shoot Portland
- Movement: Black Lives Matter; Social justice

Teressa Raiford (born 1970) is an American activist and politician in Portland, Oregon. She founded the local Black-led non-profit Don't Shoot Portland.

== Activism ==
When Raiford was a child, her grandparents' restaurant was the site of a racist action in which Portland police officers threw dead possums onto the business' doorstep. The incident prompted substantial protests against racial injustice.

On the morning of September 26, 2010, Raiford's nephew Andre Dupree Payton was shot and killed in downtown Portland. The case remains unsolved. In response, Raiford started Don't Shoot Portland, a group of activists who work for police accountability within the Portland Police Bureau and Multnomah County Sheriff's Office.

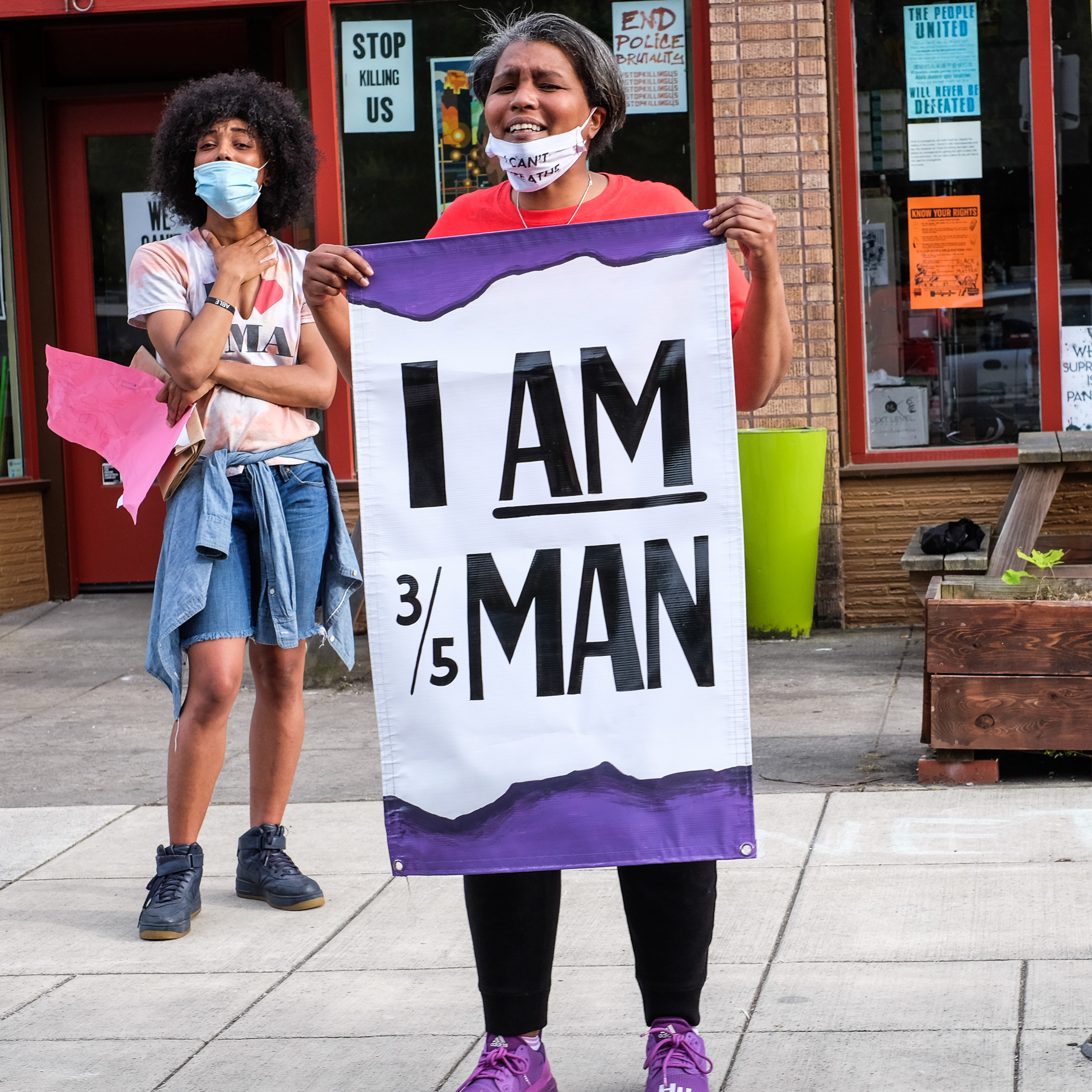
Raiford in 2020

In 2015, Raiford was arrested, charged and jailed for obstructing traffic and disorderly conduct by five officers, at a march she had organized to honor Michael Brown. In 2016 the case was dismissed by a jury. In 2017, Raiford filed a countersuit claiming damages of $500,000, claiming she was "signaled [sic] out for her outspokenness against police violence" and claiming officers made disparaging comments as they arrested her. The case was dismissed by a judge in 2019.

In June 2020, Don't Shoot Portland filed a class-action lawsuit against the City of Portland for seeking a temporary restraining order to force the Portland Police Bureau from using tear gas in the city. Don't Shoot Portland also published an in-depth report on Riot Control Agents, describing the irreparable harm caused by RCAs during the COVID-19 pandemic.

In July 2020, Don't Shoot PDX and Wall of Moms filed a federal lawsuit against the U.S. Department of Homeland Security, claiming that President Trump's deployment of federal forces to Portland was unlawful.

In 2022, Raiford was critical of public misinformation provided by the Portland police in the aftermath of the Normandale Park shooting and called for an independent investigation.

== Political campaigns ==
=== 2012 Portland City Council election ===
Raiford attempted to unseat Commissioner Amanda Fritz in the 2012 Portland City Council election. She finished in 4th out of 5th place with 3,840 votes (3.21%).

=== 2014 Multnomah County Commission election ===
In the 2014 County Commission elections, Raiford attempted to unseat then Commissioner Loretta Smith. Raiford finished 3rd out of 4th place with 1,986 votes (6.56%).

2014 Multnomah County Commission Election, District 2
Party	Candidate	Votes	%
Nonpartisan	Loretta Smith	23,644	78.11%
Nonpartisan	Bruce Broussard	3,595	11.88
Nonpartisan	Teressa Raiford	1,986	6.56
Nonpartisan	Kelvin Hall	881	2.91%
none of the above	write-ins	163	0.54%
Total votes		1,092,746	100.0%

=== 2016 Multnomah County Sheriff election ===
Raiford announced a write-in campaign against Mike Reese, former Portland Police chief, who was running unopposed. Reese won with 96.55% of the vote.

Multnomah County Sheriff Election, 2016
Party	Candidate	Votes	%
Nonpartisan	Mike Reese (Incumbent)	88,146	96.55%
Nonpartisan	Teressa Raiford (Write-in)	3,000	3.28%
	write-ins	150	0.16%
Total votes		60,422	100%

=== 2020 Portland Mayoral election ===
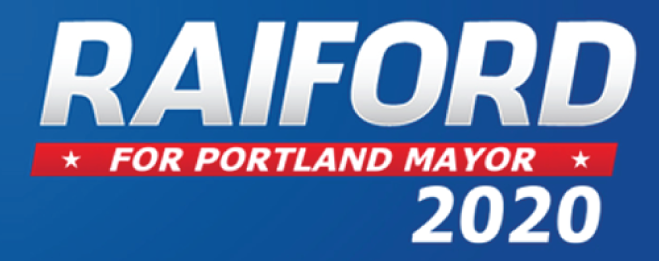
Raiford's logo for her 2020 mayoral campaign

Raiford announced her plan to run for mayor in late 2017, being one of the first candidates to announce her plan. In late 2019 and early 2020, she began recruiting volunteers and actively campaigning. On May 19, 2020, Raiford lost the primary election to Ted Wheeler and Sarah Iannarone, coming in 3rd place with 18,310 votes (8.40%).

After her defeat in the primary, supporters of Raiford promoted a write-in campaign, although Raiford declined to campaign actively. However, she did not call on her followers to stop the effort, so it remained a factor in the runoff between Wheeler and Iannarone.

Portland mayoral primary election, 2020
Party	Candidate	Votes	%
Nonpartisan	Ted Wheeler (incumbent)	107,241	49.29%
Nonpartisan	Sarah Iannarone	51,849	23.82%
Nonpartisan	Teressa Raiford	18,310	8.40%
Nonpartisan	Ozzie González	12,632	5.80%
Nonpartisan	Bruce Broussard	11,336	5.20%
Nonpartisan	Randy Rapaport	3,816	1.75%
Nonpartisan	Piper Crowell	3,272	1.50%
Nonpartisan	Mark White	2,308	1.06%
Nonpartisan	Cash Carter	1,488	0.68%
Nonpartisan	Sharon Joy	901	0.42%
Nonpartisan	Willie Banks	789	0.36%
Nonpartisan	Daniel Hoffman	702	0.32%
Nonpartisan	Michael O'Callaghan	629	0.29%
Nonpartisan	Michael Burleson	406	0.19%
Nonpartisan	Lew Humble	299	0.14%
Nonpartisan	Michael Jenkins	262	0.12%
Nonpartisan	Beryl McNair	259	0.12%
Nonpartisan	Jarred Bepristis	105	0.05%
Nonpartisan	Floyd LaBar	95	0.04%
Write-in		861	0.40%
Total votes		217,560	100.00%
