= OregonSaves =

Pension fund (2017-)

OregonSaves is a statewide program started in July 2017 by the State of Oregon to provide a public retirement savings program for private workers. It was estimated that more than half of Oregon's working population lacked access to a retirement savings plan through their employer, or more than one million workers in the small business heavy state. The program allows workers at businesses that do not provide an employer-sponsored retirement plan to automatically enroll in the OregonSaves program and start saving a percentage of their paychecks into an Individual Retirement Account in their name. Self-employed and gig economy workers can also sign themselves up directly through the website. OregonSaves accounts are portable and stay with workers throughout their careers.

The program is rolling out in waves based on the number of employees a business has. By May 15, 2020, the state will require all employers to either provide their own employer-sponsored retirement plan or to facilitate OregonSaves for their employees.
