= 2000 Portland, Oregon, mayoral election =

- May 16, 2000
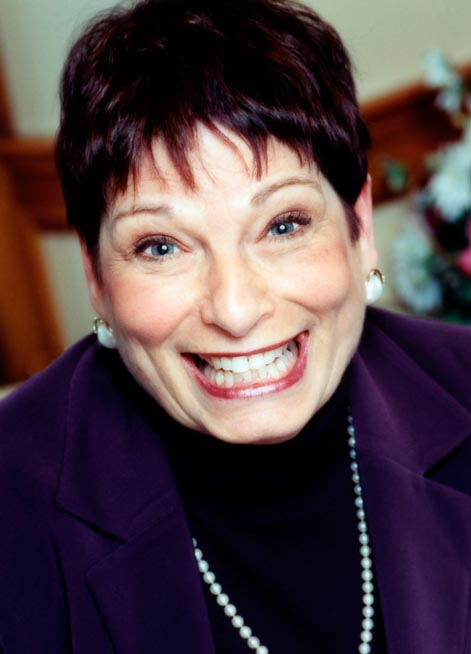

Nominee	Vera Katz	Jake Oken-Berg
Popular vote	70,303	34,125
Percentage	55.1%	26.7%
Mayor before election
Vera Katz
Elected mayor
Vera Katz

On May 16, 2000, an election was held in Portland, Oregon, to elect the mayor.. Incumbent mayor Vera Katz was re-elected to a third term.

Portland uses a nonpartisan system for local elections, in which all voters are eligible to participate. All candidates are listed on the ballot without any political party affiliation.

All candidates meeting the qualifications competed in a blanket primary election on May 16, 2000. Because Katz received a majority of the vote in the primary, no runoff election in November was necessary.

== Results ==
Katz defeated Jake Oken-Berg, a 19-year-old student and political unknown who received a surprising 27% of the vote and almost forced a runoff, as well as 15 other candidates, who, combined, received approximately 18% of the vote.

Portland mayoral primary election, 2000
Party	Candidate	Votes	%
Nonpartisan	Vera Katz (incumbent)	70,303	55.06
Nonpartisan	Jake Oken-Berg	34,125	26.73
Nonpartisan	John David Ernsberger	5,105	4.00
Nonpartisan	Bruce Broussard	4,860	3.81
Nonpartisan	Jason Fleming	2,163	1.69
Nonpartisan	Scott Conway	1,836	1.44
Nonpartisan	Blake Byrne	1,750	1.37
Nonpartisan	Charlie Gilbert	1,346	1.05
Nonpartisan	Virginia Davis	1,319	1.03
Nonpartisan	Shaun J. Fairlee	792	0.62
Nonpartisan	Jada Mae Langloss	745	0.58
Nonpartisan	Wendy Mari Loren	718	0.56
Nonpartisan	Melody Berkheiser	526	0.41
Nonpartisan	Tyrone Williams	512	0.40
Nonpartisan	William J. Doering	404	0.32
Nonpartisan	Lew E. Humble	224	0.18
Nonpartisan	Robert L. Forthan	174	0.14
Write-in		782	0.61
Total votes		127,684	100
