= 2016 Portland, Oregon, mayoral election =

- May 17, 2016
- Turnout: 63.24%
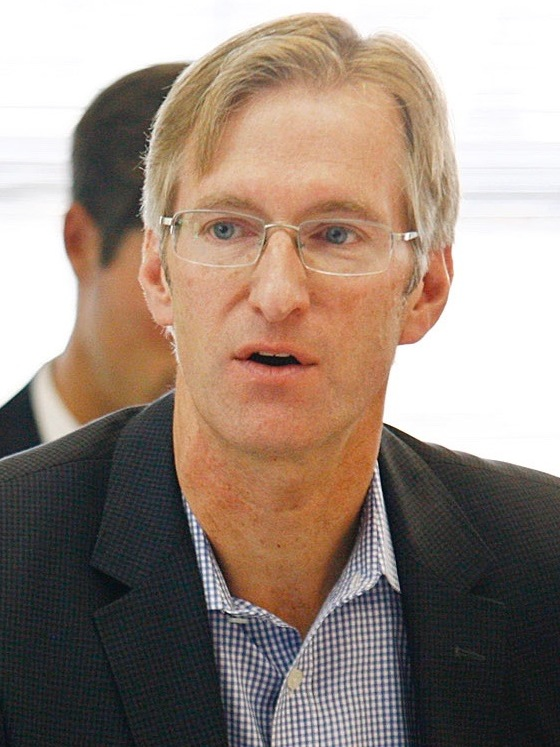

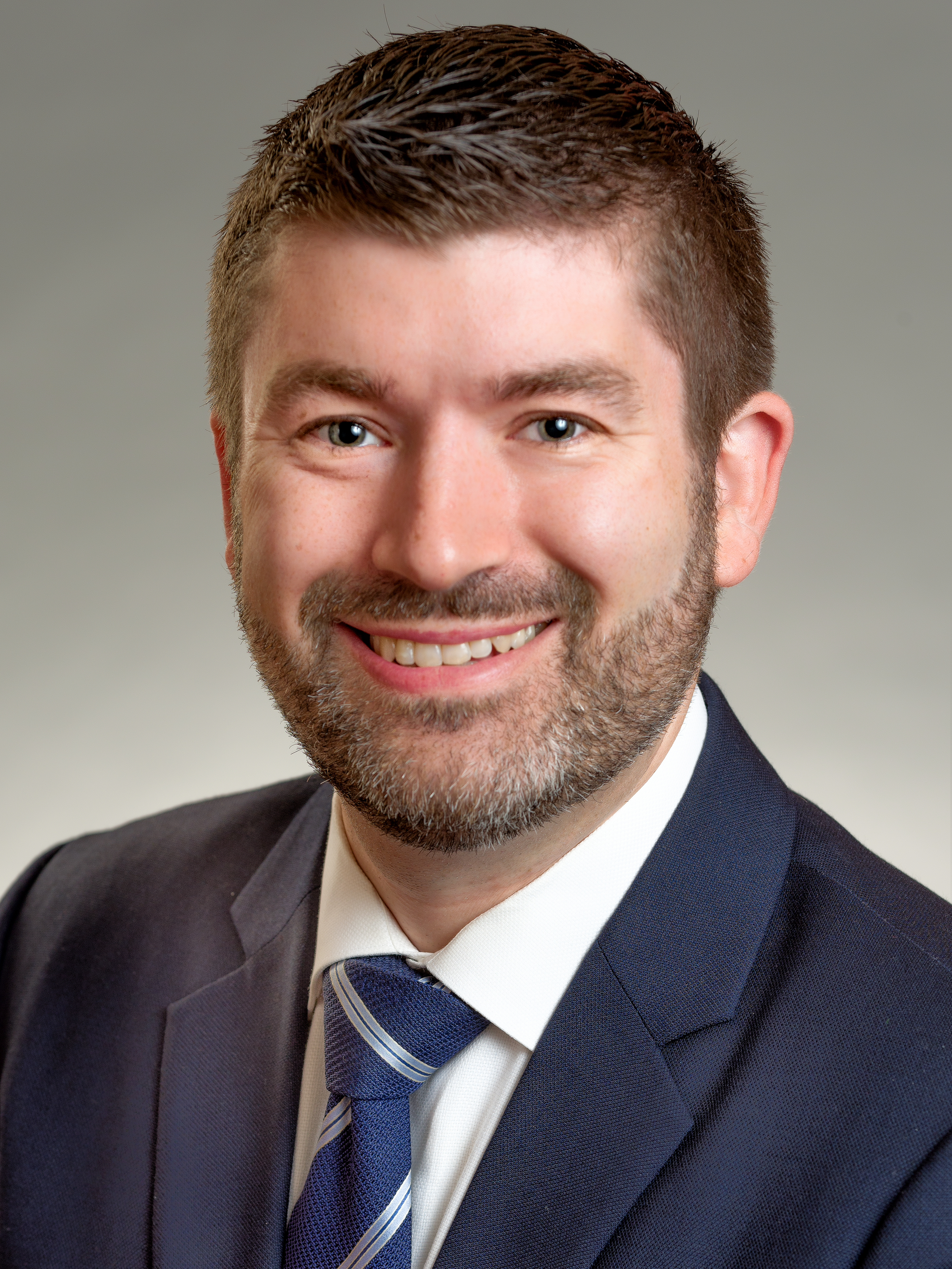

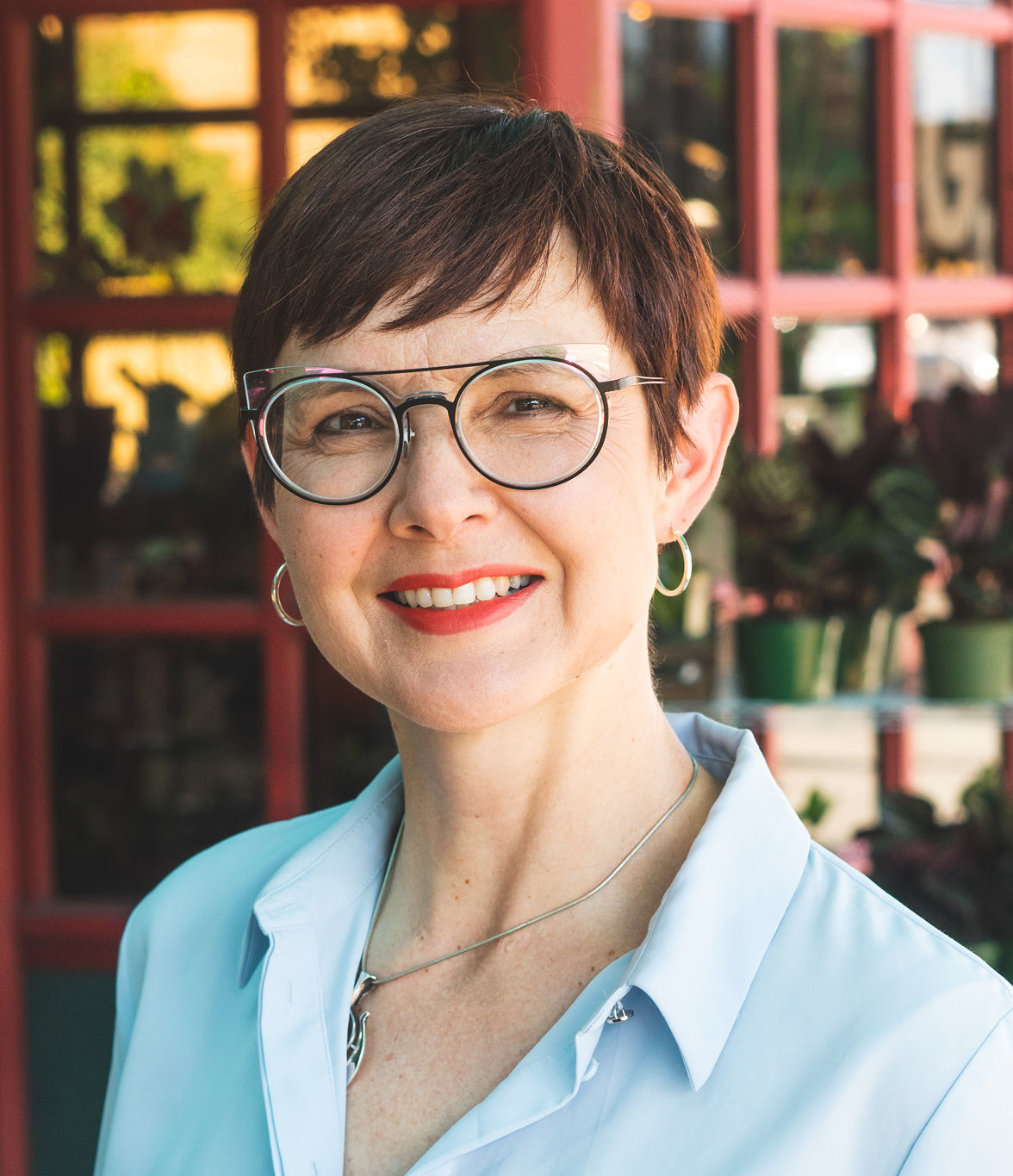
Nominee	Ted Wheeler	Jules Bailey	Sarah Iannarone
Popular vote	105,562	31,955	22,831
Percentage	54.7%	16.6%	11.8%
- Results by precinct (all voted for Wheeler). Darker shades indicate higher %s of the vote.
Mayor before election
Charlie Hales
Elected mayor
Ted Wheeler

On Tuesday, May 17, 2016, an election was held in Portland, Oregon, to elect the mayor. Ted Wheeler was elected after garnering 54% of the primary vote. Incumbent mayor Charlie Hales did not seek a second term.

Portland uses a nonpartisan system for local elections, in which all voters are eligible to participate. All candidates are listed on the ballot without any political party affiliation.

Fifteen candidates competed in a blanket primary election on May 17, 2016. As Ted Wheeler garnered 54% of the vote, a scheduled November 8 runoff election, scheduled in case that no candidate received an absolute majority, did not take place. Jules Bailey was the first runner-up in the primary, receiving 16% of the vote.

== Primary ==
=== Candidates ===
- David C. "The Ack" Ackerman, dishwasher and photographer
- Jules Bailey, Multnomah County Commissioner and former state representative
- Bruce Broussard, business owner and host of Oregon Voter Digest
- Patricia Ann "Patty" Burkett", student
- Eric Alexander Calhoun, home care worker
- Philip "Sean" Davis, author, professor, and firefighter
- Bim Ditson, small business owner, community organizer, drummer
- Steven Entwisle, kayaktivist
- Deborah Harris, business employment specialist
- Lewis E. "Lew" Humble, retired mechanic
- Sarah Iannarone, restaurateur
- Trevor Manning, equity intern
- David Schor, attorney
- Jessie Sponberg, community activist
- Ted Wheeler, state treasurer of Oregon

=== Declined to run ===
- Marissa Madrigal, Multnomah County commissioner
- Jennifer Williamson, state representative

=== Withdrawn ===
The deadline for withdrawing from the race was March 11, 2016. Incumbent mayor Charlie Hales was widely seen as the frontrunner in the election, announcing his bid for re-election in March 2015. In an unexpected move in October 2015, however, Hales announced he would drop his re-election bid and focus on running the city during his final year in office.

- Charlie Hales, Mayor of Portland

=== Polling ===
Poll source	Date(s) administered	Sample size	Margin of error	Jules Bailey	Charlie Hales	Ted Wheeler	Other	Undecided
DHM Research	May 6 – 9, 2016	402	±4.9%	9%	–	33%	15%	43%
KATU/SurveyUSA	March 28 – April 1, 2016	576	±4.2%	8%	–	38%	22%	31%
Patinkin Research Strategies	December 9–13, 2015	400	±4.9%	38%	–	35%	1%	26%
Lake Research Partners	August 29 – September 2, 2015	400	±4.9%	–	21%	34%	1%	44%

=== Forum ===
2016 Portland mayoral election candidate forum
No.	Date	Host	Moderator	Link	Nonpartisan	Nonpartisan	Nonpartisan	Nonpartisan	Nonpartisan	Nonpartisan
Key: P Participant A Absent N Not invited I Invited W Withdrawn										
Key: P Participant A Absent N Not invited I Invited W Withdrawn					Jules Bailey	Bruce Broussard	Sean Davis	Sarah Iannarone	David Schor	Ted Wheeler
1	Apr. 20, 2016	KOIN; The Portland Tribune	Jeff Gianola	YouTube	P	P	P	P	P	P

=== Results ===
Portland mayoral primary election, 2016
Party	Candidate	Votes	%
Nonpartisan	Ted Wheeler	105,562	54.67
Nonpartisan	Jules Bailey	31,955	16.55
Nonpartisan	Sarah Iannarone	22,831	11.82
Nonpartisan	Bruce Broussard	7,465	3.69
Nonpartisan	Sean Davis	5,217	2.70
Nonpartisan	David Schor	5,083	2.63
Nonpartisan	Jessie Sponberg	3,235	1.68
Nonpartisan	Bim Ditson	2,467	1.28
Nonpartisan	Patty Burkett	2,346	1.22
Nonpartisan	David Ackerman	2,255	1.17
Nonpartisan	Deborah Harris	1,636	0.85
Nonpartisan	Lew Humble	748	0.39
Nonpartisan	Trevor Manning	480	0.25
Nonpartisan	Steven J. Entwisle Sr.	405	0.21
Nonpartisan	Eric Calhoun	358	0.19
Write-in		1,040	0.54
Total votes		193,083	100

== See also ==
- 2016 Portland, Oregon City Commission election
