= Lori Stegmann =

American politician

Member of the Urban Flood Safety & Water Quality District
- Incumbent
- Assumed office January 2025

Member of the Multnomah County Board of Commissioners from the 4th district
- In office January 1, 2017 – January 1, 2025
- Preceded by: Diane McKeel
- Succeeded by: Vince Jones-Dixon

Member of the Gresham City Council Position 6
- Preceded by: Carol L. Nielsen-Hood
- Succeeded by: Janine Gladfelter

Personal details
- Born: Seoul, South Korea
- Party: Democratic (since 2018); Republican (before 2018)
- Education: Portland State University (BS); Mt. Hood Community College

Lori Stegmann is an American politician who served as a member of the Multnomah County Commission in Oregon representing the 4th district, which covers East Multnomah County and parts of East Portland.

A Moderate Democrat, Stegmann was a Republican until 2018 when she switched party affiliation citing the Trump administration as her reason for switching.

== Early life and education ==
Stegmann was born in Seoul, South Korea, and was abandoned by her parents on the steps of city hall. She was adopted from an orphanage by a Gresham family. She grew up in the Rockwood neighborhood.

Stegmann attended Mt. Hood Community College and received her bachelor's degree in business from Portland State University.

== Career ==
Stegmann runs Lori Stegmann Insurance Agency, and affiliate of Farmers Insurance Group. She served as vice-chair of the Gresham Planning Commission and a member of the Gresham Redevelopment Commission Advisory Committee and Rockwood Stakeholders Group before being elected to the Gresham city council in the 2010 elections where she served for 6 years.

In 2016, Stegmann ran for and was elected to the Multnomah County Commission. She was the only Republican on the commission before changing her party affiliation to Democratic in 2018.

In 2022, Stegmann ran for County Chair. She came in fourth in the primary with 12.56% of the vote.
