= Multnomah County Sheriff's Office =

Law enforcement agency in Oregon, United States

Coordinates: 45.5263°N 122.5378°W

- Patch of the Multnomah County Sheriff's Office
- Motto: A Safe and Thriving Community for Everyone

Agency overview
- Formed: 1854; 172 years ago
- Employees: 800

Jurisdictional structure
- Legal jurisdiction: Multnomah County
- General nature: Local civilian police

Operational structure
- Headquarters: Multnomah County, Oregon
- Deputies: 590
- Civilian employees: 210
- Agency executive: Nicole Morrisey O'Donnell, Sheriff

Facilities
- Offices: 5: Multnomah Building; Columbia River Office; Willamette River Office; Wood Village City Hall; Troutdale Police Community Center
- Lockups: 3: Inverness Jail; Multnomah County Detention Center (MCDC); Multnomah County Courthouse Jail (MCHJ)

Website
- Official website

Multnomah County Sheriff's Office (MCSO) serves the close to 700,000 residents of Multnomah County, Oregon, United States. Multnomah County Sheriff's Office is a County Law Enforcement agency that handles 9-1-1 calls and assists other city agencies such as the Portland Police Bureau. The current Sheriff is Nicole Morrisey O'Donnell. The cities of Maywood Park, Wood Village, Fairview, and Troutdale contract out the law enforcement services of the Multnomah County Sheriff's Office.

The sheriff is elected by popular vote, and oversees a budget of $118 million.

== History ==
The Multnomah County Sheriff's Office was established in February 1854, with William L. McMillen as the first sheriff; he served until 1862. In 1960, the Sheriff's Office created the River Patrol Unit, which has grown to be the largest river patrol division in the state.

In the past, as recently as the 1980s, the position was essentially the "top cop" in the county, performing law enforcement for the bulk of the county's population. As of 2009, however, as the unincorporated areas of the county have diminished, 85% of sheriff's office employees work in corrections rather than law enforcement.

On July 1, 2015, the Sheriff's Office began policing services for the city of Troutdale. In a 10-year agreement, the officers and civilian personnel of the Troutdale Police department were brought in as sworn deputies and employees of the Sheriff's Office. The agreement was reported to save the City of Troutdale over $900,000 per year over a ten-year period. The deal also included leasing of the Troutdale Police Community Center. The Law Enforcement patrol, property, and records divisions were also moved from the Hansen Building to this location in July, 2015.

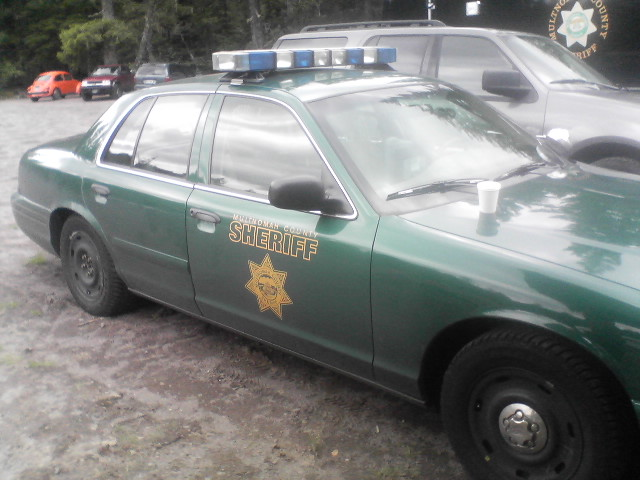
A Multnomah County Sheriff's vehicle with 2020-2025 livery

The sheriff's office oversees a budget of $118 million.

In early 2020, the Sheriff's Office switched their emerald uniforms to black ones. Part of this change also included updating the vehicle livery and retiring their green vehicles.

In 2023, Nicole Morrisey O'Donnell became the first female Sheriff in the agency's history.

Overdoses among inmate escalated due to illegally smuggled drugs by inmates. In August 2023, a strip search was put back into place in response.

In January 2025, MCSO updated their vehicle livery.

== Controversies ==
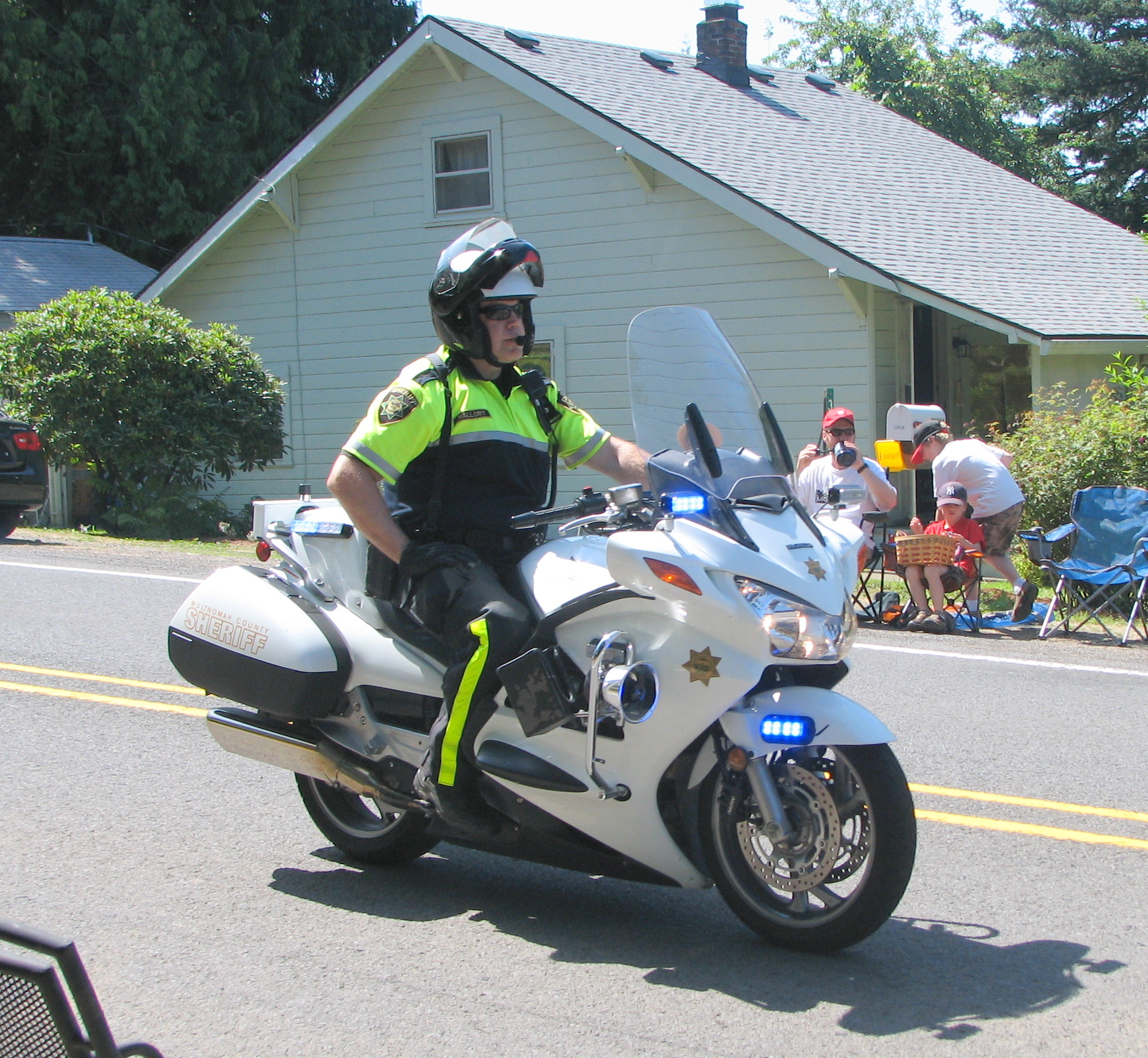
Deputy patrols the Independence Day parade route in Corbett.

=== Sheriff Bernie Giusto ===
Former Sheriff Bernie Giusto resigned on July 1, 2008 after a state police standards board recommended that he lose his badge because of multiple issues including using an official vehicle for personal use, lying about a relationship he had with former Governor Neil Goldschmidt's wife while he was assigned to the governor's protective service branch in the mid-1980s, and allegations that he lied about his knowledge of Goldschmidt's illegal sexual relationship with a minor in the 1970s. In addition to ethics violations, Giusto was thought to have managed the county budget poorly, and when confronted about such issues once replied with "They're not my bosses; they're my bankers, I'm not gonna debate how I do spend my budget. That's why I'm independently elected." Days after making that comment, he closed the county's restitution center, which was a program that was just created that year.

=== 2015 retaliation incident ===
In 2015, Sergeant Brent Ritchie worked with three other deputies to investigate use of force in the Sheriff's Office's jails. Their conclusion was that the use of force was disproportionately used against Black inmates. Sheriff Dan Staton demoted Ritchie upon being shown the final report.

In 2019, a court rules that Staton retaliated against Ritchie and Ritchie was awarded $250,000 plus attorney's fees.

== Rank structure ==
Title	Insignia
Sheriff	
Undersheriff	
Chief Deputy	
Captain	
Lieutenant	
Sergeant	
Deputy	none

== List of Sheriffs ==
Portrait	Officeholder	Tenure
	William L. McMillen	1854-1858
	Addison M. Starr	1858-1868
	Robert I. Ladd	1862-1864
	Jacob Stitzel	1864-1868
	Al Zieber	1968-1870
	George V. James	1871-1872
	I. M. Claywood	1872-1874
	E. I. Jeffery	1874-1878
	Ben L. Norden	1878-1880
	Joseph Buchtel	1880-1882
	George X. Sears	1894-1896
	William Frazier	1896-1902
	William A. Storey	1902-1904
	Tom Word	1904-1906
	Robert L. Stevens	1906-1913
	Tom Word	1913-1915
	Thomas M. Hurlburt	1915-1931
	Martin T. Pratt	1931-1949
	Marion Leroy Elliot	1949
	Terry D. Schrunk	1949-1956
	William F. Lambert	1957-1963
	Donald E. Clark	1963-1967
	Byron H. Shields	1967
	James C. Holzman	1967-1970
	Bard Purcell	1970-1974
	Louis Rinehart	1974-1975
	Lee P. Brown	1975-1976
	Edgar E. Martin	1976-1982
	Frederic B. Pearce	1982-1989
	Robert Skipper	1989-1994
	John Bunnell	1994-1995
	Dan Noelle	1995-2002
	Bernie Giusto	2003-2007
	Robert Skipper	2007-2009
	Daniel Staton	2009-2016
	Mike Reese	2016-2022
	Nicole Morrisey O'Donnell	2023–present

== See also ==
- Faces of Meth
- Multnomah County Sheriff's Office Search and Rescue
- List of law enforcement agencies in Oregon
