= Bruce Broussard (politician) =

American activist

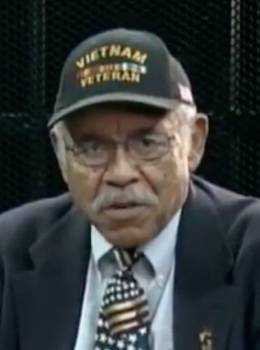

Personal details
- Born: October 16, 1938 (age 88) Louisiana, United States
- Party: Independent
- Other political affiliations: Libertarian (2016–?); Republican (before 2016)
- Spouse: Norma

Herbert Bruce Broussard (born October 16, 1938) is an American political activist, veteran, and journalist based in Portland, Oregon. He is known for hosting the Oregon Voter Digest cable access program. Broussard is also a perennial candidate, running unsuccessfully for numerous offices since the 1970s.

== Early life and career ==
Broussard grew up in Louisiana and went to school in Houston, Texas. He attended Texas Southern University and Portland State University.

In 1960, he enlisted in the United States Marine Corps. Following a tour of duty in Vietnam, Broussard was stationed in Portland to work as a recruiter. He served a total of 10 years in the Marines and 3 in the Oregon Army National Guard. After being discharged from the military, he remained in Portland and became active in local organizations, including the Urban League of Portland, the NAACP, Veterans of Foreign Wars, and the Boys & Girls Clubs of America. He also served on several local public utilities boards.

Broussard worked for a time for the Portland Observer newspaper and for KBOO radio station. At one point, he owned and operated a Christmas tree farm near Sandy, Oregon.

== Political career ==
Broussard ran for Oregon House of Representatives from the 16th district in 1976 and 1978 as a Republican; both times he lost to Democratic incumbent Wally Priestley. In 1982, he ran for Governor of Oregon, placing fourth out of five candidates in the Republican primary.

Broussard ran for United States Senate in 2004. He placed second in the Republican primary, receiving 22 percent of the vote, but lost to rancher Al King, who in turn went on to lose the general election to Democrat Ron Wyden. He received the endorsement of former Governor Vic Atiyeh, whom Broussard lost his 1982 gubernatorial bid to.

After Multnomah County began to issue marriage licenses to same-sex couples in 2004, Broussard filed a lawsuit aiming to stop the issuing; it was dismissed. By 2026, Broussard had reversed his position and claimed not to have remembered the 2004 lawsuit.

During his 2004 Senate bid, Broussard indicated opposition to Ballot Measure 30, which would have increased taxes, and support for a national universal healthcare system.

In 2006, he was the Republican nominee for Oregon's 3rd congressional district, winning the primary off write-ins. Broussard received 23 percent of the vote in the general election compared to Democrat Earl Blumenauer's 73 percent.

=== Local politics ===
Broussard has run for Mayor of Portland thrice: in 2000, 2016, and 2020. All three times, he was unsuccessful. In addition, he ran for Portland City Commissioner in 1996 and Multnomah County Commissioner from the 2nd district in 2014 and 2018; again without success. In 2022, Broussard ran for Multnomah County Chair and placed fifth out of six candidates.

His 2016 mayoral campaign centered around curbing homelessness in Portland, and he proposed banning homeless people from sleeping on sidewalks.

Broussard ran for Metro Council President in 2026, placing fourth out of five candidates and losing to Juan Carlos González. When asked by The Oregonian about his priorities if elected, he said, ”I don’t know 100%.”

Broussard is running for District 2 of the Multnomah County Commission once again in the 2026 election. If elected, he said he would prioritize combating homelessness and increasing police presence throughout the county.

=== Party affiliations and endorsements ===
In 2016, Broussard, a longtime Republican, switched to the Libertarian Party, saying, "Over the years, and especially during this election, it has become clear that we need a strong and effective third party to represent the American people. I will continue to work with my Republican and Democrat friends where I can, but I look forward to bringing a fiscal conservative and socially liberal voice to Multnomah County politics." He also endorsed Gary Johnson's presidential campaign.

In 2022, Broussard appeared in a commercial for Republican Christine Drazan, endorsing her in the 2022 Oregon governor's race.

As of 2026, Broussard was registered as an unaffiliated voter.

== Personal life ==
Broussard and his wife, Norma, reside in North Portland. They operated Norma's Kitchen, which served Cajun and Louisiana Creole cuisine. The restaurant closed in 2017. He is fluent in Louisiana Creole and plays the washboard in a Creole band.
