= Don't Shoot Portland =

Advocacy group based in Portland, Oregon

- Logo

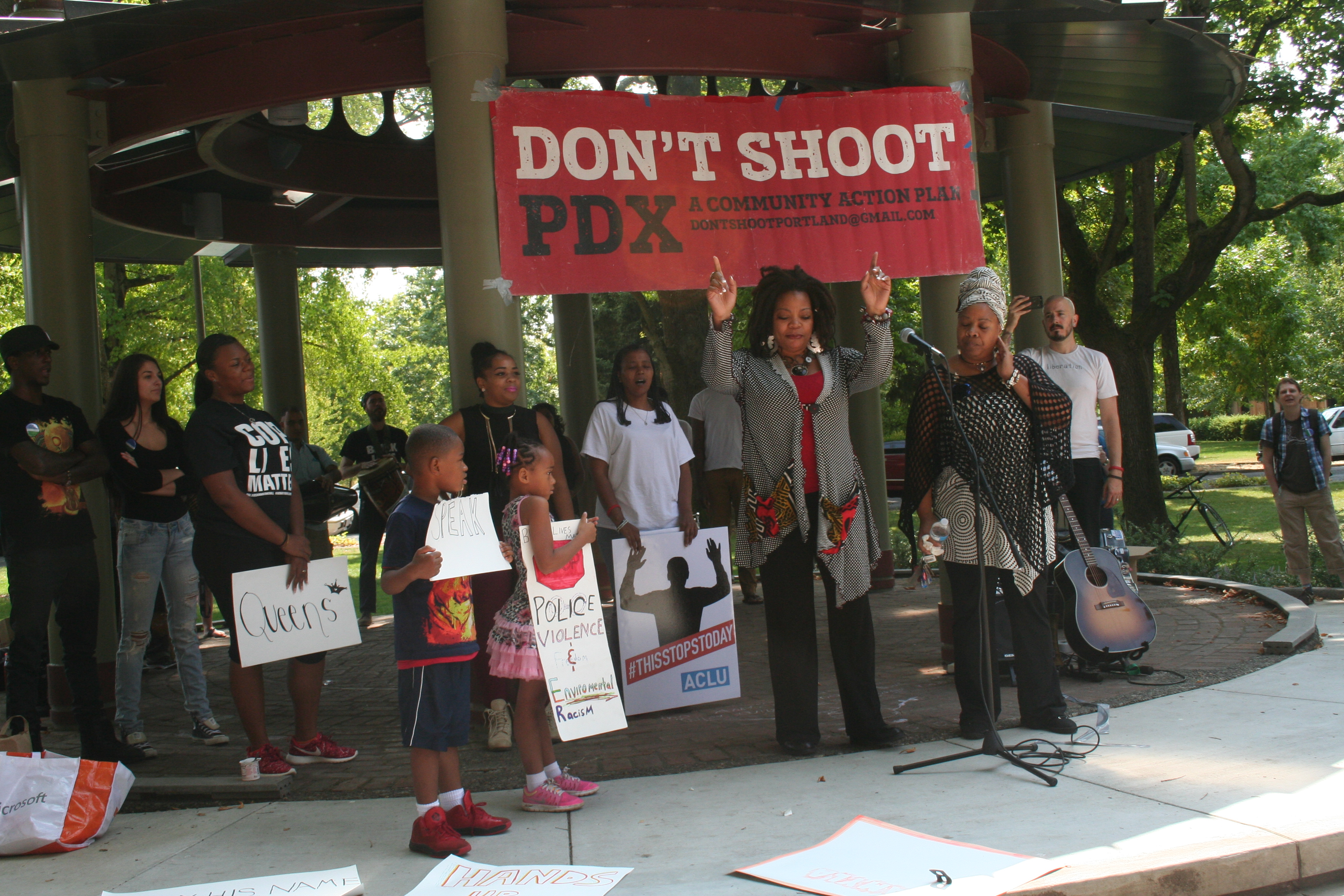
- Supporters at a rally in 2015

Don't Shoot Portland, also called Don't Shoot PDX, is a Portland, Oregon-based accountability group formed by Black Lives Matter supporter Teressa Raiford to scrutinize actions of the Portland Police Bureau.

== History ==
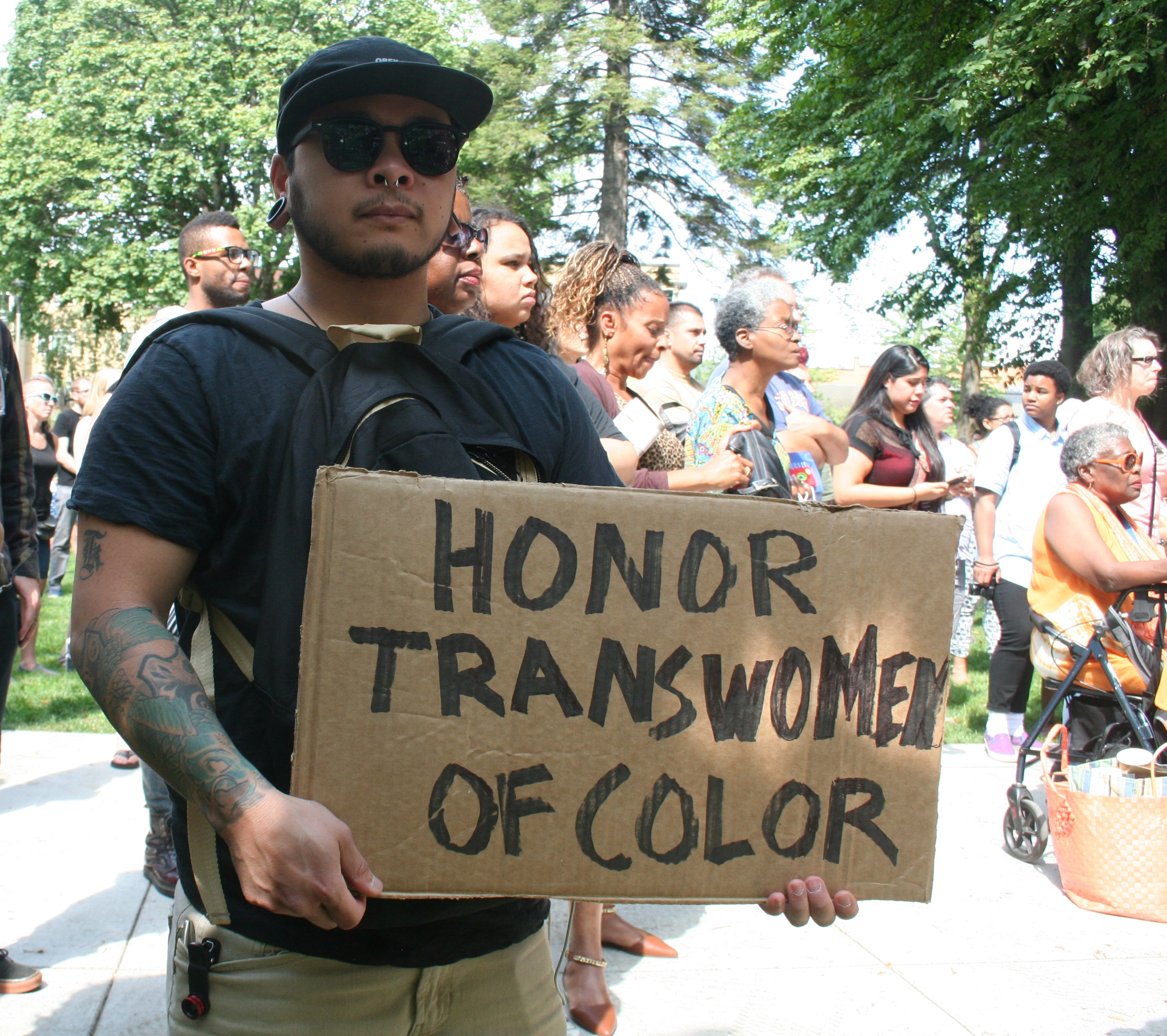
Demonstrator holding signage in support of trans women of color

Don't Shoot Portland held a march on 7 July 2016 following the police killings of two black men: Alton Sterling in Louisiana and Philando Castile in Minnesota. At the march, conservative blogger Michael Strickland pulled a gun and pointed it at protesters. According to The Hill, video showed Strickland holding what appeared to be a video camera while arguing and backing away from protesters, before drawing his weapon. Strickland, known to post YouTube videos for "Laughing at Liberals", was shepherded away from the crowd by Jessie Sponberg, a mayoral candidate, before being arrested by police. He was later convicted of crimes relating to this incident.

In 2021, Raiford stated that activists in Portland were focused on saving lives while city leaders were focused on saving windows.

Don't Shoot Portland sued the Department of Homeland Security over the 2020 deployment of federal forces in Portland.

== See also ==
- Black Lives Matter art in Portland, Oregon
- George Floyd mural
- George Floyd protests in Oregon
- Hands up, don't shoot
- Moms United for Black Lives
- Not My Presidents Day
