= 1934 in art =

Events from the year 1934 in art.

== Events ==
- April – David Low's cartoon character Colonel Blimp first appears in the London Evening Standard.
- April 10 – The Just Judges, a panel of the Ghent Altarpiece painted by Jan van Eyck or his brother Hubert between 1430–32, is stolen from St Bavo's Cathedral, Ghent, Belgium. In November, on his deathbed, Arsène Goedertier admits to the theft but most of the panel is never recovered.
- August 31 – John Smiukse destroys the mural Nightmare of 1934 in Tarrytown, New York.
- Publication in the United States of Irving Stone's biographical novel of Vincent van Gogh, Lust for Life.

== Works ==
- Eileen Agar – The Autobiography of an Embryo
- Hans Arp – Human Concretion (Musée National d'Art Moderne, Paris)
- Balthus – Guitar Lesson
- Paul Cadmus
  - Coney Island
  - The Fleet's In!
  - Greenwich Village Cafeteria
- Salvador Dalí – The Ghost of Vermeer of Delft Which Can Be Used As a Table
- Edwin Dickinson – Stranded Brig
- Antonio Donghi – Canzone
- Raoul Dufy – Regatta at Cowes (National Gallery of Art, Washington D.C.)
- Jacob Epstein – Portrait bust of George Bernard Shaw
- M. C. Escher – Still Life with Spherical Mirror (lithograph)
- Leo Friedlander – marble reliefs outside Oregon State Capitol
  - Covered Wagon
  - Lewis and Clark
- Lily Furedi – The Subway
- Edward Hopper – East Wind Over Weehawken
- Paul Manship – Prometheus (gilded bronze sculpture, Rockefeller Center, New York City)
- Joan Miró – Woman
- Ronald Moody – Wohin (carved oak head)
- C.R.W. Nevinson – The Strand by Night
- Ben Nicholson – 1934 (relief)
- José Clemente Orozco – The Epic of American Civilization (mural, Dartmouth College, New Hampshire, 1932-34)
- Pablo Picasso – Minotauromachy
- Diego Rivera – Man, Controller of the Universe (mural, Palacio de Bellas Artes, Mexico City)
- Amrita Sher-Gil – The Little Girl in Blue
- Raphael Soyer – How Long Since You Wrote to Mother?

== Exhibitions ==
- April - The Unit One group holds its only exhibition, in Cork Street (London), accompanied by a book, Unit 1: the Modern Movement in English Architecture, Painting and Sculpture, edited by Herbert Read.

== Awards ==
- Archibald Prize: Henry Hanke – Self Portrait
- Légion d'honneur: Gen Paul

== Births ==
- January 3 - Yves Gaucher, Canadian artist (d. 2000)
- January 4 – Zurab Tsereteli, Georgian painter and sculptor (d. 2025)
- January 18 – Raymond Briggs, English illustrator (d. 2022)
- February 11 – Mary Quant, English fashion designer (d. 2023)
- February 26
  - Frank Bowling, Guyanese-born painter
  - José Luis Cuevas, Mexican artist (d. 2017)
- February 27 – Vincent Fourcade, French interior designer (d. 1992)
- March 1 – Jean-Michel Folon, Belgian sculptor (d. 2005)
- March 7 – Gray Morrow, American comic book artist and book illustrator (d. 2001)
- March 20 – Eric Hebborn, English art forger (d. 1996)
- April 16 – Vicar, Chilean comic book artist
- May 29 – Jef Geys, Belgian artist (d. 2018)
- June 15 – Aron Tager, American-Canadian actor, voice actor and artist (d. 2019)
- June 18 – Dimitris Mytaras, Greek painter (d. 2017)
- June 20 – Rius (Eduardo Humberto del Río García), Mexican cartoonist (d. 2017)
- July 11 – Giorgio Armani, Italian fashion designer (d. 2025)
- July 18 – Jean-Michel Sanejouand, French painter and sculptor (d. 2021)
- July 24 – Lee Friedlander, American photographer
- August 14 – Lucien Clergue, French photographer (d. 2014)
- September 14 – Kate Millett, American sculptor and feminist activist (d. 2017)
- October 14 – Rose Wylie, English painter
- December 28 – Alasdair Gray, Scottish fiction writer and artist (d. 2019)
- date unknown
  - Sheila Hicks, American fiber artist
  - Sven Lukin, Latvian-born American artist (d. 2022)
  - Neil Williams, American painter (d. 1988)

== Deaths ==
- March 23 – Wenzel Hablik, German painter, graphic artist and designer (b. 1881)
- March 28 – Mahmoud Mokhtar, Egyptian sculptor (b. 1891)
- April 11 – John Collier, English Pre-Raphaelite painter (b. 1850)
- June 29 – Adolf Kašpar, Czech painter and illustrator (b. 1877)
- July 1 – Jules Monge, French painter (b. 1855)
- August 17 – Aleksandr Borisov, Russian Arctic landscape painter (b. 1866)
- September 1 – Yumeji Takehisa, Japanese poet and painter (b. 1884)
- October 11 – M. O. Hammond, Canadian photographer (b. 1876)
- October 12 – Gertrude Käsebier, American portrait photographer (b. 1852)
- October 17 – Adolf Hölzel, German painter of an Impressionism to expressive modernism style (b. 1853)
- November 4 – Sir Alfred Gilbert, English sculptor (b. 1854)
- December 4 – Paul-Albert Besnard, French painter (b. 1849)
- December 28 – Pablo Gargallo, Spanish painter and sculptor (b. 1881)
- date unknown – Alfred Boucher, French sculptor (b. 1850)

== See also ==
- 1934 in fine arts of the Soviet Union
