= Covered Wagon (sculpture) =

Sculpture in Salem, Oregon, U.S.

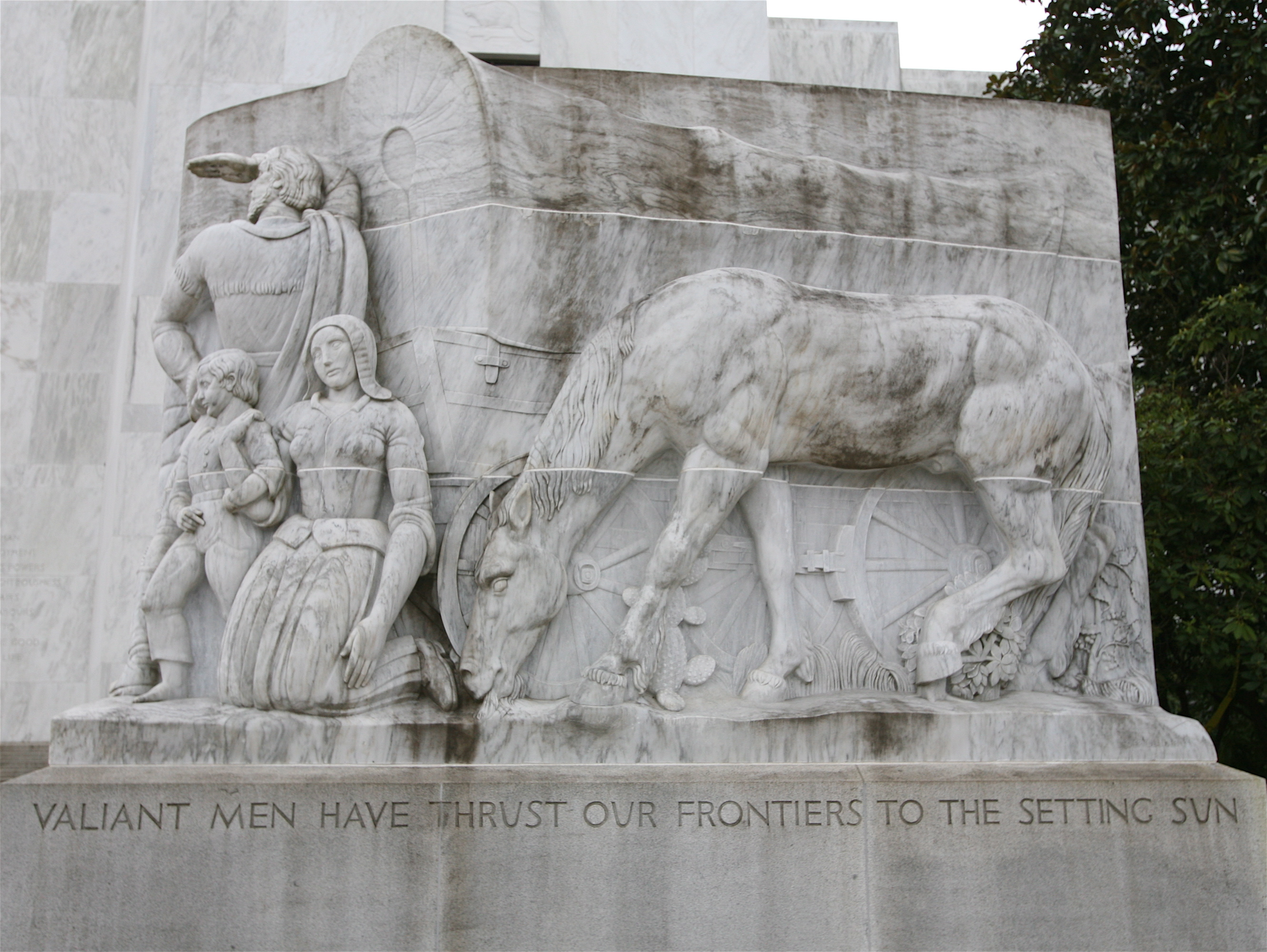
- The relief in 2008
- Artist: Leo Friedlander
- Year: 1934
- Type: Relief
- Medium: Marble, granite
- Subject: Pioneer family, horse, covered wagon
- Condition: "Treatment needed" (1993)
- Location: Salem, Oregon, United States; 44.93880°N 123.03046°W

Covered Wagon, also known as Oregon Trail Immigrants Memorial and Pioneer Family, is an outdoor 1934 white marble sculpture by Leo Friedlander installed outside the Oregon State Capitol in Salem, Oregon, United States.

== Description and history ==
Leo Friedlander's Covered Wagon (1934) is a high relief carving depicting a pioneer family in front of a covered wagon, located outside the Oregon State Capitol's main entrance. The figure group includes a father, mother and young boy, plus a horse. The father faces westward with his proper right hand shielding his eyes from the sun, while the mother is shown kneeling and facing forward. The white marble sculpture, carved from a block made of six smaller pieces, measures approximately 152 inches (3.9 m) x 18.5 feet (5.6 m) x 91 inches (2.3 m) and rests on a granite base that measures approximately 67 inches (1.7 m) x 19.5 feet (5.9 m) x 90 inches (2.3 m). On the back is a map illustrating the area covered by the Oregon Trail and depictions of pioneer life. The installation also includes a signed inscription that reads: LEO FRIEDLANDER SC VALIANT MEN HAVE THRUST OUR FRONTIERS TO THE SETTING SUN.

The sculpture was surveyed and considered "treatment needed" by the Smithsonian's "Save Outdoor Sculpture!" program in August 1993, and was administered by the Facilities Division of the Oregon Department of Administrative Services at that time.

== See also ==
- 1934 in art
- Stone carving
- Stone sculpture
- The Promised Land (sculpture), Portland, Oregon
