= Lewis and Clark (sculpture) =

Sculpture in Salem, Oregon, U.S.

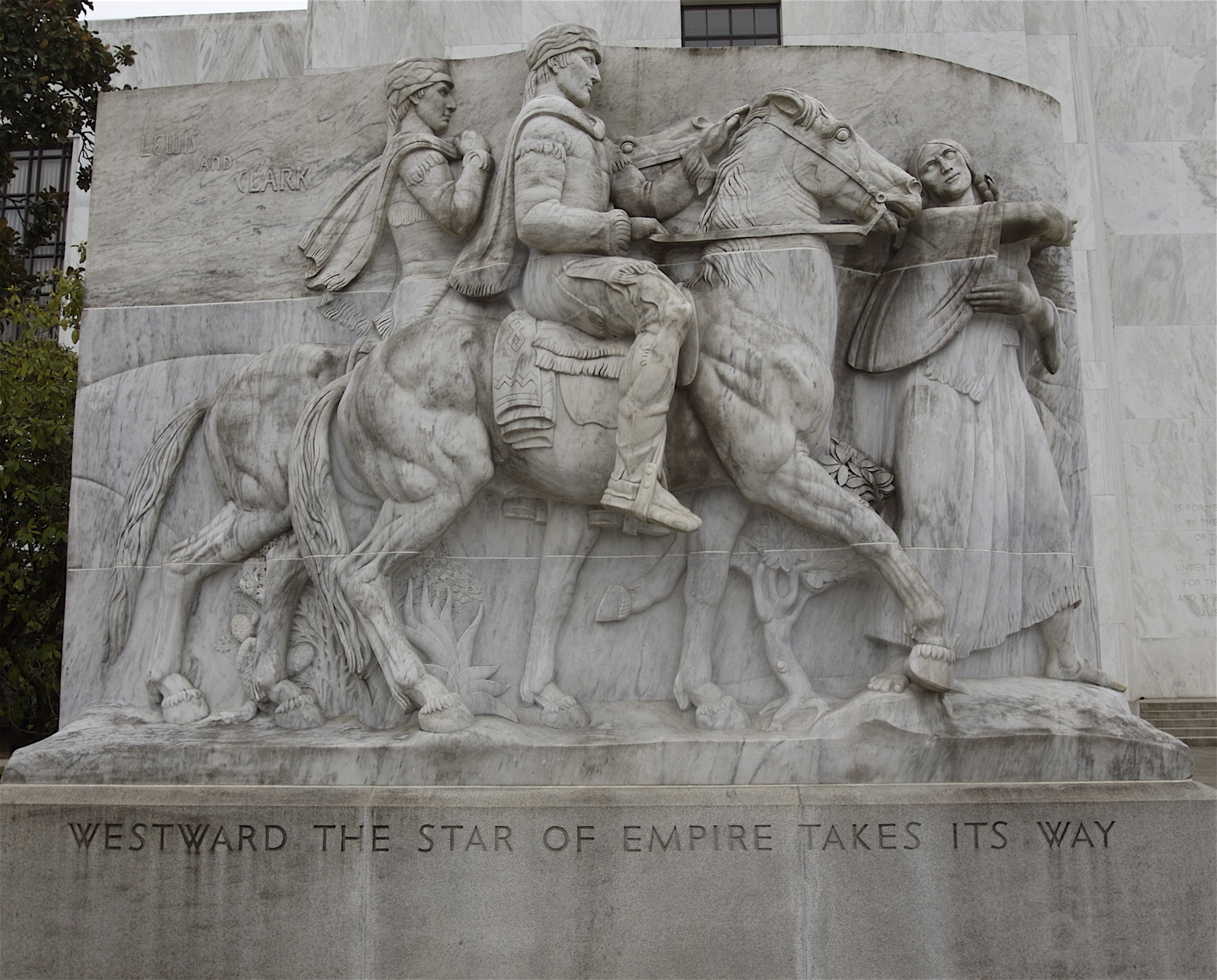
- The relief in 2008
- Artist: Leo Friedlander
- Year: 1934
- Type: Relief
- Medium: Marble, granite
- Subject: Meriwether Lewis, William Clark, Sacajawea
- Condition: "Well maintained" (1993)
- Location: Salem, Oregon, United States; 44.93871°N 123.03008°W

Lewis and Clark, also known as the Lewis and Clark Expedition of 1804–1806 Memorial, is an outdoor 1934 white marble sculpture by Leo Friedlander installed outside the Oregon State Capitol in Salem, Oregon, United States.

== Description and history ==
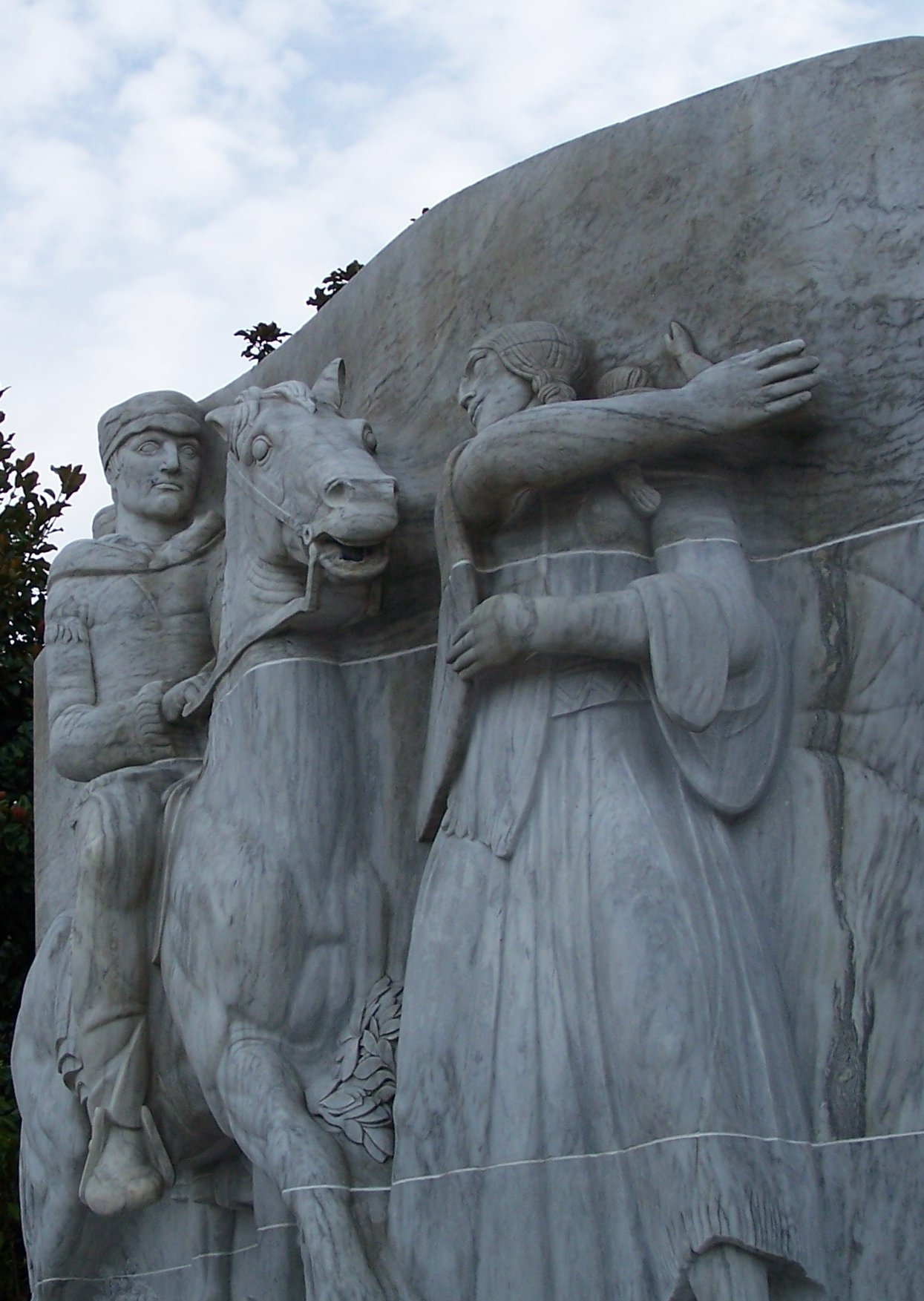
Detail of the relief, 2006

Leo Friedlander's Lewis and Clark (1934) is a high relief carving depicting Meriwether Lewis and William Clark of the Lewis and Clark Expedition on horseback, being led by Sacajawea, located outside the Oregon State Capitol's main entrance. The white Vermont marble sculpture, carved from a block made of six smaller pieces, measures approximately 153 inches (3.9 m) x 18.5 inches (0.47 m) x 8 feet (2.4 m) and rests on a granite base that measures approximately 51 inches (1.3 m) x 19.5 feet (5.9 m) x 90 inches (2.3 m). On the back is a map illustrating the area covered by Lewis and Clark and depictions of both hunting and meetings with Native Americans. The installation also includes a signed inscription that reads "LEO FRIEDLANDER" on the lower left and "WESTWARD THE STAR OF EMPIRE TAKES ITS WAY" across the base.

The sculpture was surveyed and considered "well maintained" by the Smithsonian's "Save Outdoor Sculpture!" program in August 1993, and was administered by the Facilities Division of the Oregon Department of Administrative Services at that time.

== See also ==
- 1934 in art
- Captain William Clark Monument, University of Portland
- Coming of the White Man (1904), Portland, Oregon
- Lewis and Clark Memorial Column (1908), Portland, Oregon
- Meriwether Lewis and William Clark (1919 sculpture)
- Sacajawea and Jean-Baptiste (1905), Portland, Oregon
- Stone carving
- Stone sculpture
