= Captain William Clark Monument =

Sculpture in Portland, Oregon

- Naming of Mt. Jefferson
- The monument in 2018
- Artist: Michael Florin Dente
- Year: 1988
- Medium: Bronze sculpture; cement, stone (base)
- Subject: William Clark; York
- Location: Portland, Oregon, U.S.
- 45°34′15.9″N 122°43′28.9″W

The Captain William Clark Monument, also known as Naming of Mt. Jefferson, is an outdoor monument commemorating William Clark by art professor Michael Florin Dente, installed on the University of Portland campus, in Portland, Oregon, United States.

== History ==
The memorial was dedicated on December 11, 1988, and features 7-foot (2.1 m) bronze sculptures of Clark, York, who was Clark's slave, and an unnamed Native American on a 4-foot (1.2 m) cement and stone base.

In 2020, during the anti-racism protests in the weeks after the police murder of George Floyd, the statue of York was removed.

== See also ==
- 1988 in art
- Lewis and Clark (sculpture), Salem
