= Virginia War Memorial =

Coordinates: 37.5369°N 77.4486°W

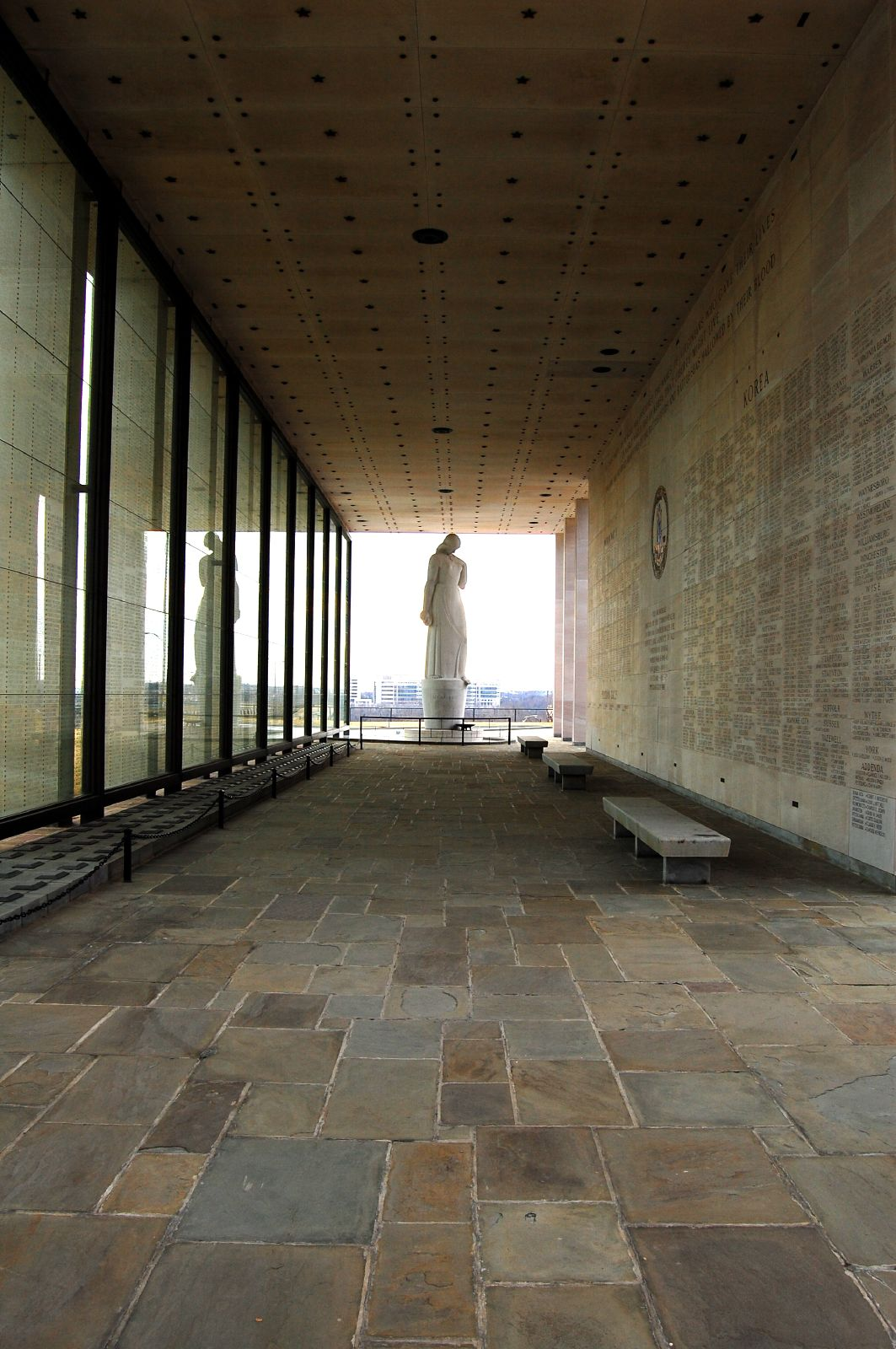
Statue inside the memorial by Leo Friedlander

The Virginia War Memorial is a 1955 memorial in Richmond, Virginia, originally dedicated to Virginians killed in World War II and the Korean War. In 1980, the Shrine was enlarged to honor those Virginians killed in action in the Vietnam War. In 1996, the names of Virginians killed in action during Desert Storm/Desert Shield were added. Today, there are nearly 12,000 Virginians whose names are engraved on the Shrine of Memory's glass and stone walls. Reflecting the different character of war today, Virginia has created a special Memorial Shrine to honor the over 250 Virginians killed in the Global War on Terrorism.

The Virginians at War documentary video series, combined with other efforts, significantly increased the War Memorial's public image in the local region and throughout the Commonwealth, and highlighted the message of the "Price of Freedom". The Memorial added staff and volunteers to meet the increasing demand for its educational offerings and to assist with increased visitors to the Memorial.

To alleviate the increasing demand on the facilities, an education center was planned to expand the educational opportunities and outreach for students and visitors, and to provide adequate visitor services. A design was created to add an 18,000 square foot education center that would provide additional space to accommodate multiple groups and visitors.

== Paul and Phyllis Galanti Education Center ==
In October 2007, the Memorial Trustees and Directors announced that a new education center would be named for two American heroes, Paul and Phyllis Galanti. Each served the United States beyond the call of duty during and since the Vietnam War; Paul Galanti was a prisoner of war (POW) during the Vietnam War, and Phyllis Galanti organized efforts to obtain the release of her husband and other American POWs. The Paul and Phyllis Galanti Education Center was dedicated on February 29, 2010, and features an amphitheater and an indoor theater.

== Visiting Virginia War Memorial ==
In 2008, over 21,000 people from 45 states and 21 countries visited the memorial.

Past the front doors there is a display cabinet full of battle coins in the memory of Claiborne G. Thomasson for his dedication and leadership in the United States Air Force between 1963-1969. There is display information for the American Revolutionary War, Mexican War, American Civil War, Spanish American War, World War I,and World War II, Korean War, and Vietnam War. Each one includes a timeline of the war.

There is a Research Library, displaying guns and uniforms from the National Guard in World War I. There is also a piece of the West Wall of the Pentagon, from the September 11 attacks. The artifact is a section of the wall from the crash site.

The next room is the Freedom Hall, which has the Wall of Honor of Virginia’s Heroes of the Global War on Terrorism. There is also a display of Women in Naval Aviation, with pictures and uniforms and helmets.
