= The Promised Land (sculpture) =

Sculpture in Portland, Oregon

- The sculpture in April 2015
- Artist: David Manuel
- Year: 1993
- Type: Sculpture
- Medium: Bronze
- Subject: Pioneer family
- Dimensions: 3.0 m × 1.7 m × 1.7 m (10 ft × 5.5 ft × 5.5 ft)
- Location: Portland, Oregon, United States; 45°30′55″N 122°40′40″W
- Owner: Oregon Trail Coordinating Council

The Promised Land is a bronze sculpture by David Manuel that was formerly installed in Chapman Square (Plaza Blocks), in Portland, Oregon. The sculpture, erected in 1993, depicts a pioneer family at the end of their journey. It was removed from public display in 2020 in response to vandalism and racial justice concerns during the George Floyd protests. The City of Portland is currently in the process of deaccessioning the statue from its collection.

== Description and history ==
The Promised Land is a bronze sculpture depicting a pioneer family, including a father, mother and son, at the end of their journey. It was commissioned by the Oregon Trail Coordinating Council for $150,000 to commemorate the 150th anniversary of the Oregon Trail. The sculpture measures approximately 10 feet (3.0 m) x 5.5 feet (1.7 m) x 5.5 feet (1.7 m). The Smithsonian Institution offers the following description:

Standing figures of a pioneer family, circa 1843. The parents stand to the back and their son stands between them in front. The father is bearded and wearing a long-sleeve shirt, trousers with suspenders and mid-calf boots. He points with his proper right hand and his proper left arm is around his wife, who wears a long prairie dress shawl, and apron. Her hair is in a bun, and she holds a doll to her chest in her proper left hand. The boy wears trousers with suspenders and his shirt sleeves are rolled up. He holds a Bible in his proper right hand, against his proper right leg. A wagon wheel and leaning rifle stand behind the father figure.

The sculpture was completed and copyrighted in 1993, and dedicated on March 17 of that year. According to the Smithsonian, which surveyed the work through its "Save Outdoor Sculpture!" program in October 1993, the sculpture was located at the Oregon History Center at 1200 Southeast Park Avenue and was administered by the Oregon Trail Coordinating Council. It was set on a laminated board base which measured approximately 2.5 feet (0.76 m) x 7 feet (2.1 m) x 6 feet (1.8 m) and weighed 3,000 lbs., and was considered "well maintained" at the time of the survey.

The sculpture was installed at Chapman Square, one of the Plaza Blocks, and rested on a red granite slab which contains an inscription of a quote by Thomas Jefferson. The plaza in front of the sculpture has sandblasted black bear, coyote, elk, grouse, jackrabbit, black bear and porcupine footprints, plus moccasin prints.

Portland's art commission objected to the statue as culturally insensitive at the time of its installation, arguing that its celebration of white settlers excluded other groups present in Oregon at the time and criticizing what they described as a lack of artistic merit. The Oregon Trail Coordinating Council, who had commissioned the piece, responded that works representing other groups were in progress.

== Vandalism and removal ==
The artwork was vandalized during the local George Floyd protests, and later removed and stored out of public view.

In June 2023, the Mellon Foundation awarded the city of Portland and Lewis & Clark College a joint grant to hold public talks about the possible restoration of "The Promised Land" and other statues removed during the Floyd protests.

In 2024, the city announced that the statue would be deaccessioned from its collection at a yet to be determined date.

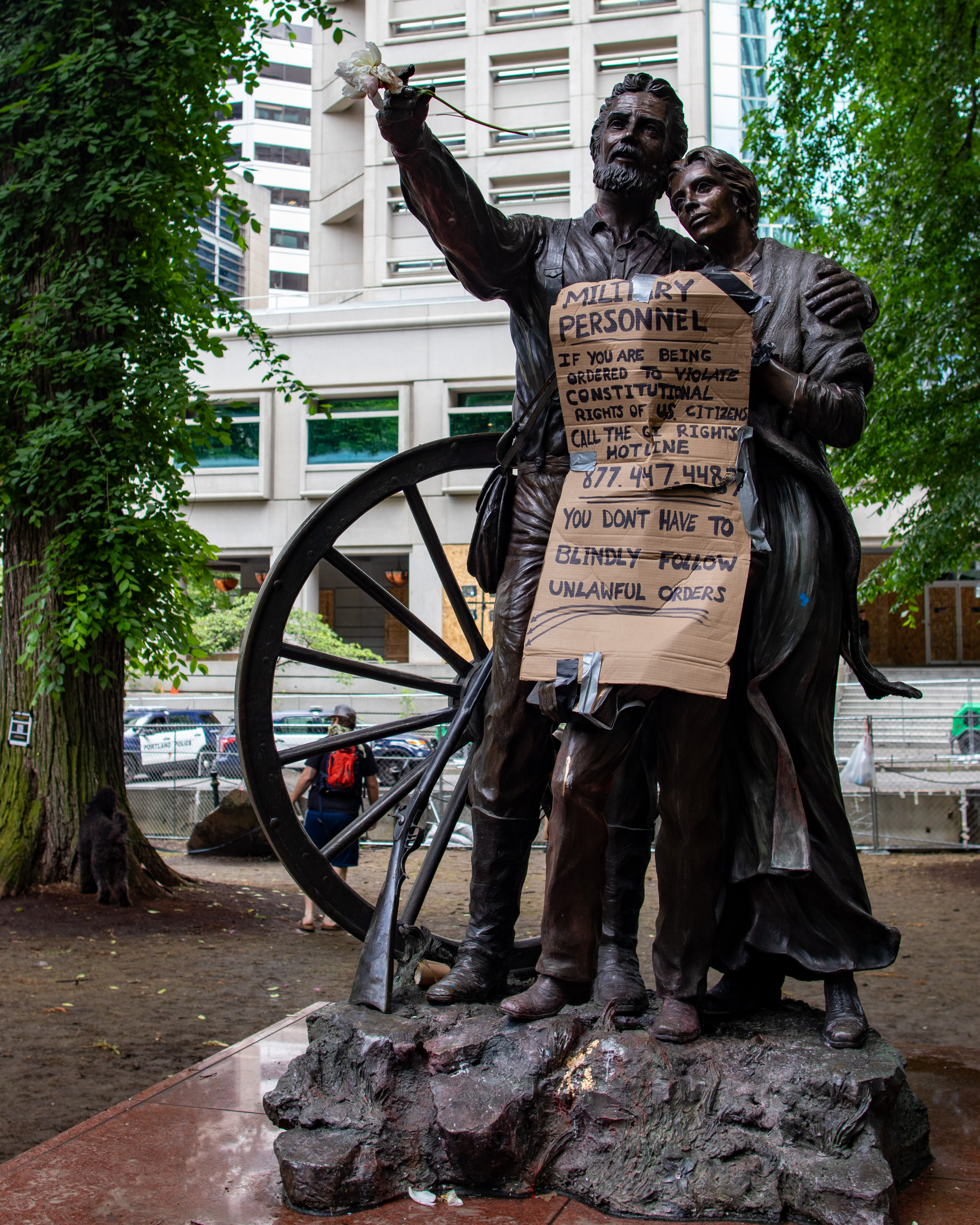
Sculpture during George Floyd protests

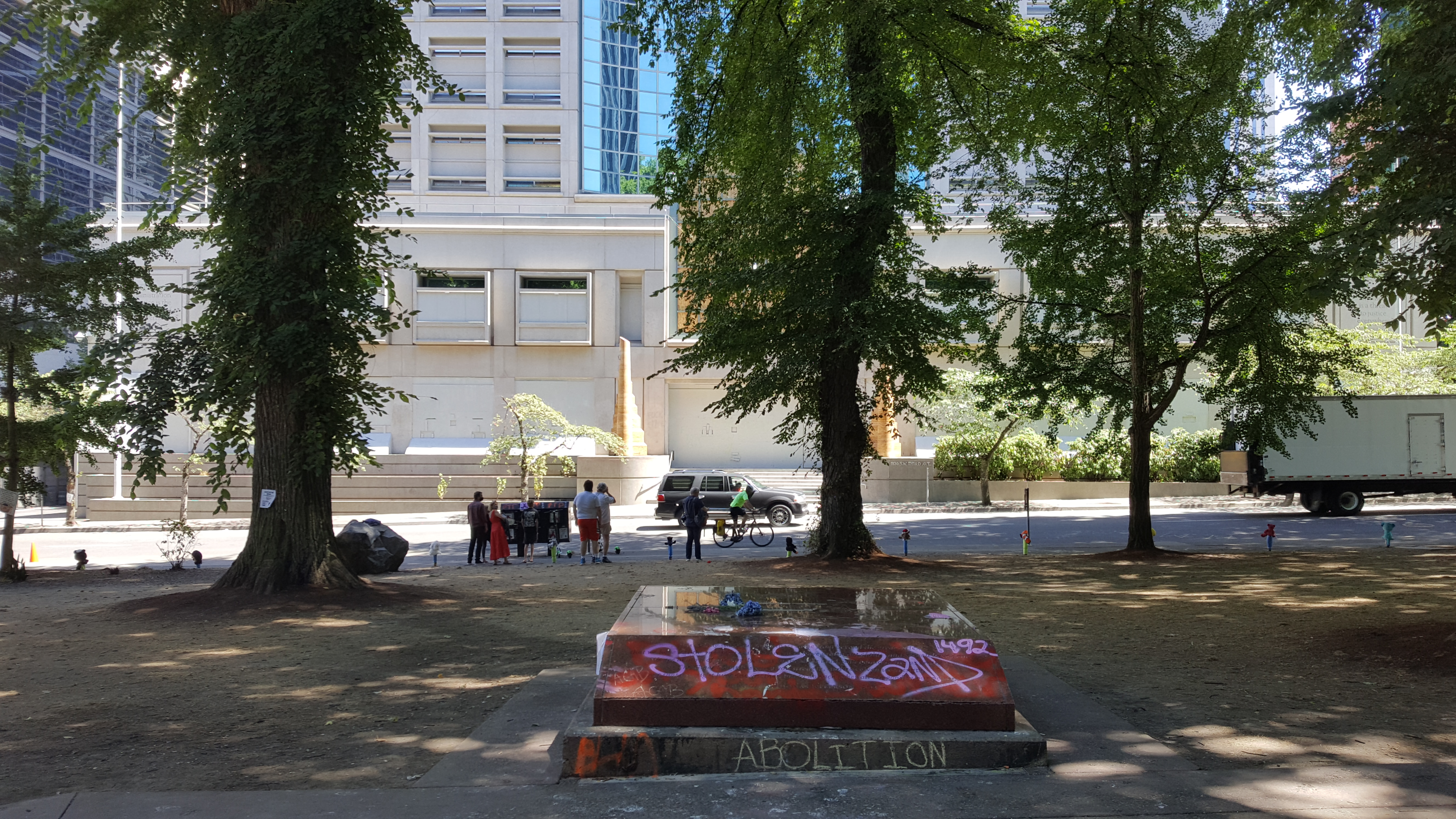
Installation site on July 25, 2020

== See also ==
- 1993 in art
- Covered Wagon (sculpture), in Salem
- City on a Hill
- Manifest Destiny
