= Occupy Portland =

2011 American protest movement

- Part of the Occupy movement
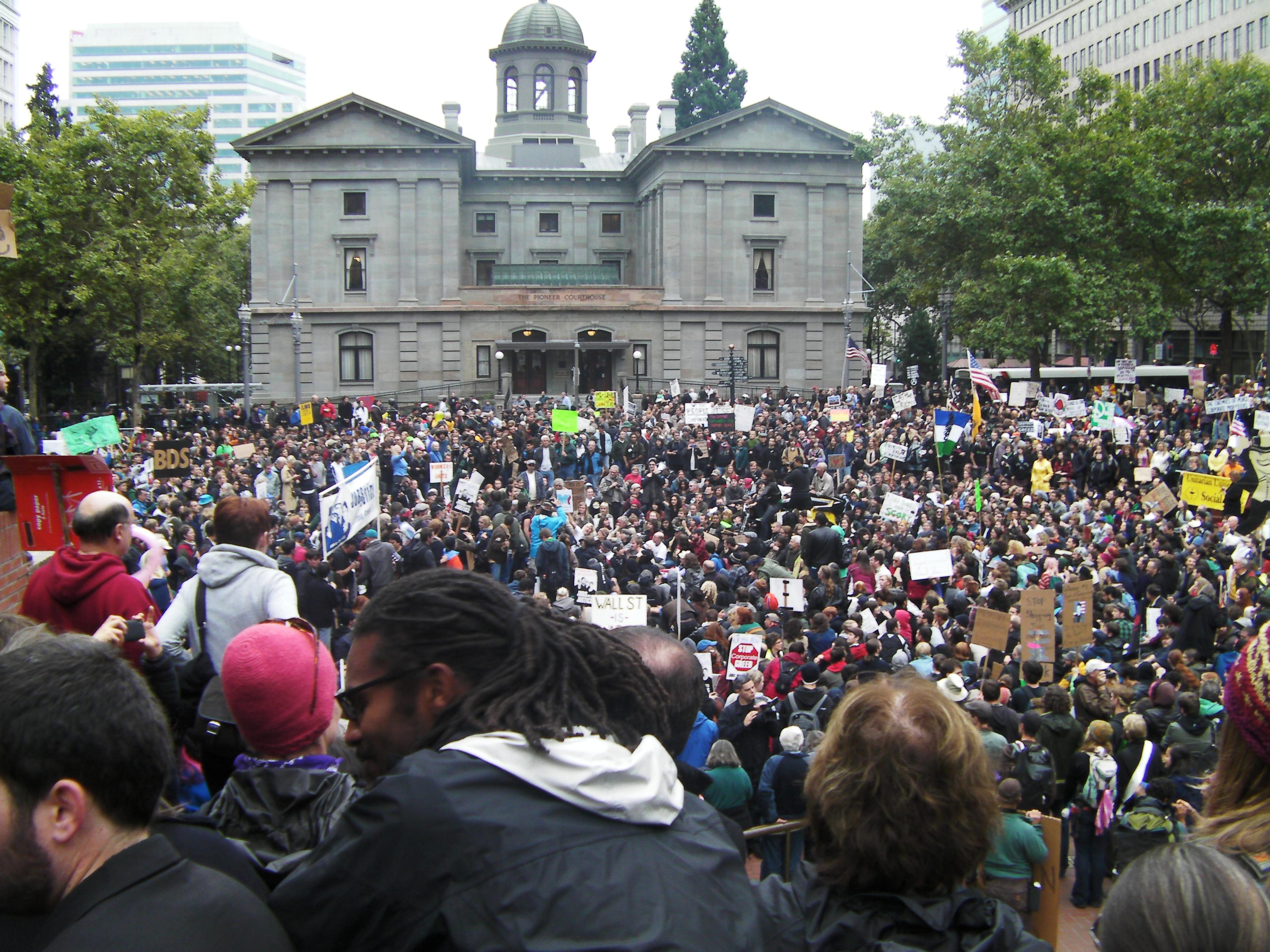
- Protesters gathered in Portland's Pioneer Courthouse Square to Occupy Portland on October 6, 2011
- Date: October 6 – December 12, 2011
- Location: Portland, Oregon; 45.5159°N 122.67745°W
- Methods: Demonstration, occupation, protest, street protesters

Arrests and injuries
- Injuries: 3+
- Arrested: 10 (initially); 27 (October 30)

Occupy Portland was a collaboration that began on October 6, 2011, in downtown Portland, Oregon, as a protest and demonstration against economic inequality worldwide. The movement was inspired by the Occupy Wall Street movement that began in New York City on September 17, 2011.

The movement's initial October 6 march drew an estimated 10,000 to Pioneer Courthouse Square. The protesters later set up an encampment in the Plaza Blocks Park near Portland City Hall. The Plaza Blocks include Lownsdale Square on the north side and Chapman Square to the south, which were the focus of the encampment.

On November 10, Portland mayor Sam Adams gave the protesters a deadline to clear out of the park by 12:01 AM on November 13. The order was given in response to rising crime rates and police overtime costs. It was reported in February 2012 that police overtime pay for policing Occupy Portland activities has amounted to approximately US$2 million. The tent city that was the physical base of Occupy Portland was dismantled by the Portland Police on November 13. However, the eponymous organization behind Occupy Portland has continued to plan acts of civil disobedience. On December 12, Occupy Portland led a picket that successfully shut the Port of Portland for the day.

As of July 2012, Occupy Portland had continued to engage in organized meetings, events and actions. As of July 2015, Occupy Portland had continued to organize events and support efforts against war and supporting student debt strikers.

== Background ==
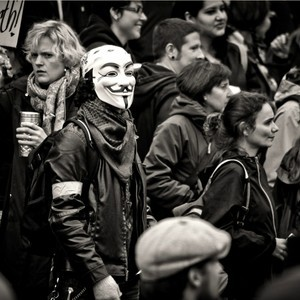
Anonymous supporter at the Occupy Portland march on October 6, 2011.

Occupy Portland was inspired by the Occupy Wall Street movement, which in turn was inspired by the Arab Spring and popularized by the anti-commercial activist magazine Adbusters and the group of activist hackers Anonymous.

== Occupation of Lownsdale and Chapman squares ==
=== Preparations ===
Occupy Portland organizers began work on the rally two weeks prior. Before the march began, rally leaders gathered to share contact information for legal assistance should any arrests be made. Leaders wore arm bands designating roles such as medic, peacekeeper, etc. City officials urged protesters to obtain a permit and to share the intended route. Organizers did neither, but did cooperate with police throughout the day of the rally.

Portland mayor Sam Adams released a statement the morning of October 6 acknowledging Occupy Portland's plans for peaceful protest and warning city residents of potential "disruptions". He insisted that city representatives and the Portland Police Bureau reach out to event organizers to ensure a "peaceful, effective, and orderly event where everyone is safe". The Portland Business Alliance issued a security warning and encouraged downtown businesses to use caution.

=== Protest ===
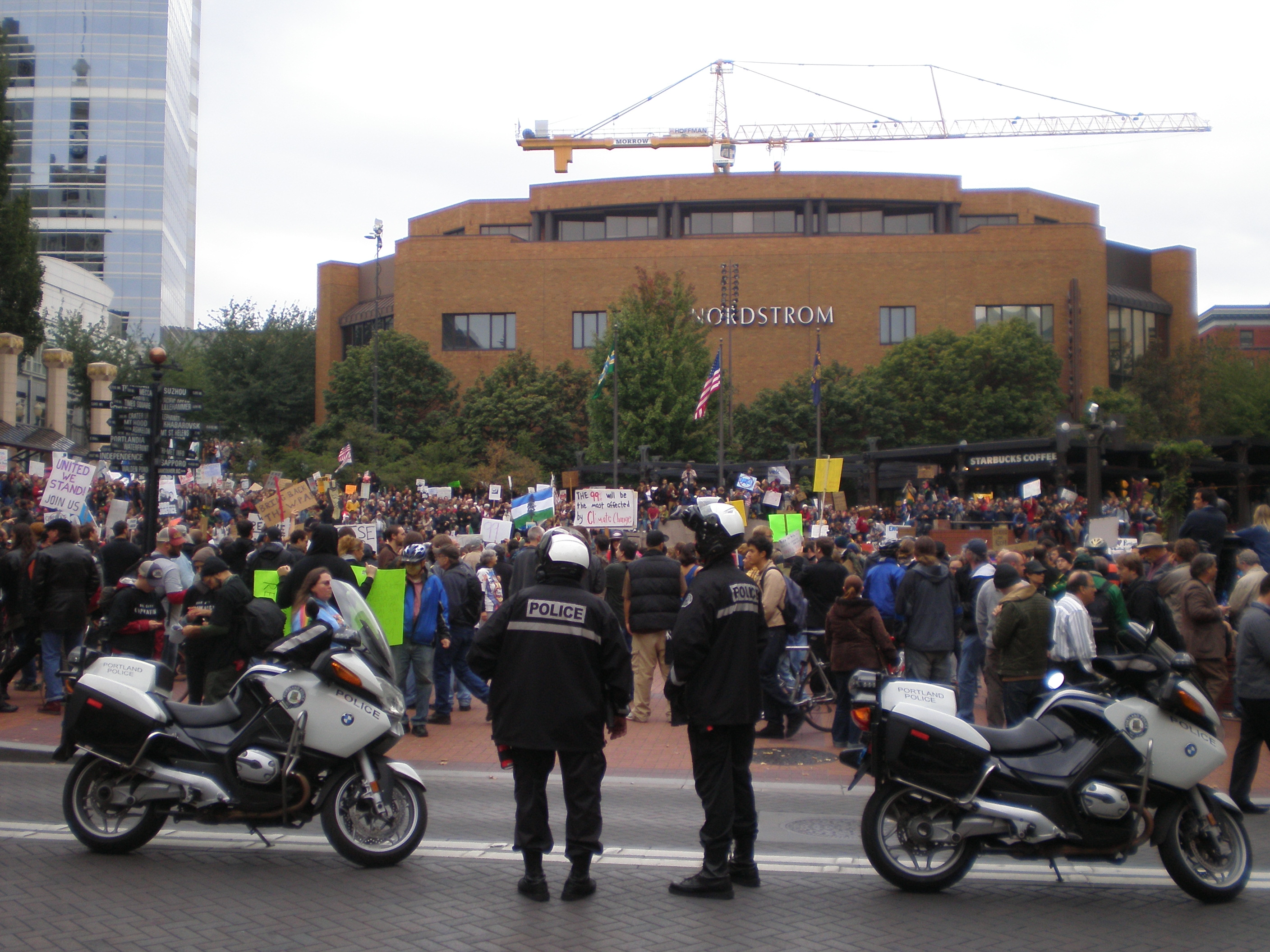
Occupy Portland protesters at Pioneer Courthouse Square are observed by Portland Police

According to the organizers, the protest is based on frustration with "corporate greed and a lack of government accountability." Demonstrators met at Tom McCall Waterfront Park near the Burnside Bridge at noon and began marching along Yamhill Street to Pioneer Courthouse Square starting at 2:30 p.m.

Portland Police estimated the crowd at more than 4,000 people when the march began, increasing to 10,000 by mid-day and filling Pioneer Courthouse Square and its surrounding streets. The size of the crowd forced TriMet, the public agency that operates mass transit throughout the Portland metropolitan area, to temporarily halt operation of the Green and Yellow MAX Light Rail lines along the Portland Transit Mall. Part of Broadway street was closed for nearly an hour and a half. No arrests were made. With permission from Mayor Adams, hundreds of demonstrators settled in Lownsdale and Chapman squares to camp overnight.

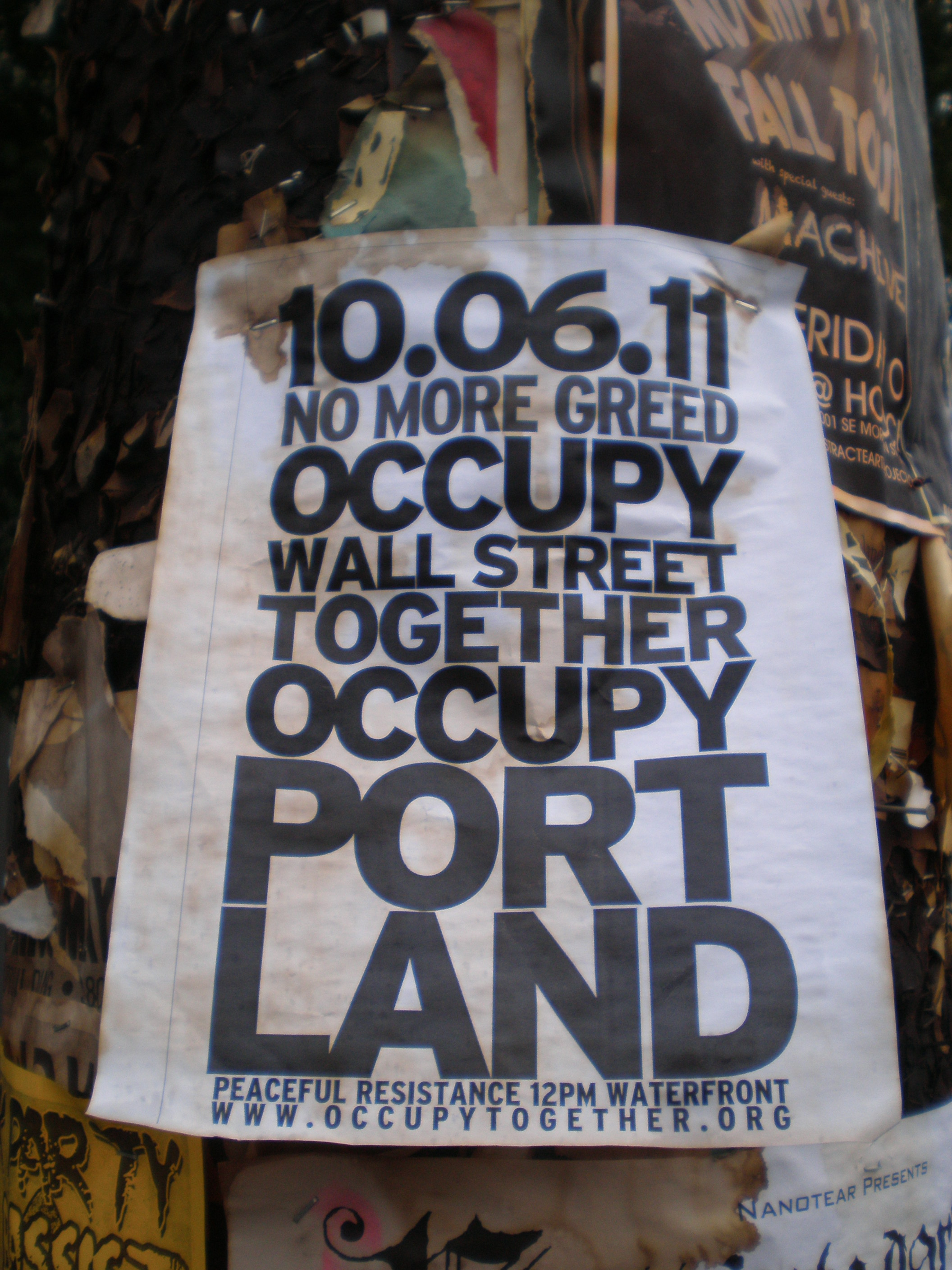
Occupy Portland poster

Protesters were also occupying the one-block section of SW Main Street between Lownsdale and Chapman Squares. Mayor Adams met with the protesters to ask them to clear the street to allow traffic from the Hawthorne Bridge, which exits onto Main Street, to flow freely. Most, but not all, protesters agreed; on the night of October 12, police cleared the street and made eight arrests, indicating that they would continue to keep the street open.

On October 26, the organizers of Occupy Portland reported the disappearance of $20,000 donated to the group through a PayPal account. Following the loss of the donations, the Occupy Portland finance committee filed with the State of Oregon to incorporate the organization as a non-profit against the wishes of the general assembly, the organizations decision-making forum. Finance committee member Reid Jackson said the filing was made to prevent an infiltrator within the group from capitalizing on the money the movement was attracting.

A protest in the Pearl District began the afternoon of October 29, following a march that ended in Jamison Square. Mayor Sam Adams had prohibited the expansion of the protest into city parks beyond Chapman and Lownsdale squares; when protesters defied him, 27 of them were arrested. Protestors said that the residents of the Pearl District were members of the wealthy demographic they were protesting.

=== Public reaction ===
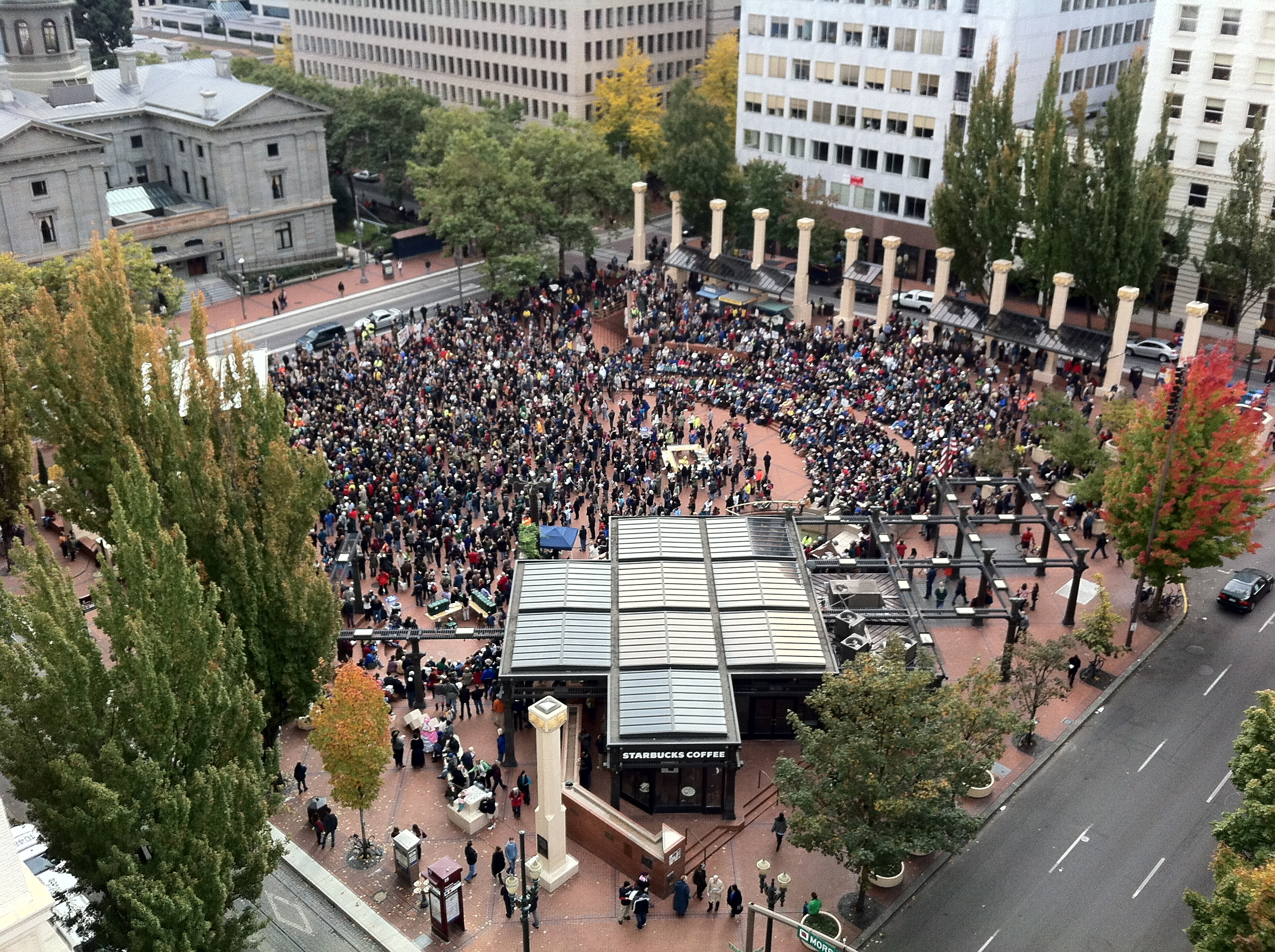
Pink Martini entertains Occupy Portland protesters in Portland's Pioneer Courthouse Square.

Members of Portland's chapter of Veterans for Peace as well as members of the International Longshore and Warehouse Union, the Pacific Northwest Regional Council of Carpenters, Laborers' International Union of North America, and other local labor organizations participated in the march. The executive board of Laborer's Local 483 (LIUNA) released a statement in support of the protest. Mayoral candidate Eileen Brady expressed her support for the demonstration, though she echoed Mayor Sam Adams' contention that protesters should abide by city ordinances and not block streets without a permit.

State Representative Jefferson Smith was the only of three major contenders in Portland's 2012 mayoral race to go on the record as opposing any attempt to remove the protest camp from downtown Portland as long as the protesters remained peaceful. "If things are getting out of hand criminally, we've got to be willing to use force. But we shouldn't be willing to use force merely for the expression of speech," said Smith on October 25.

On October 31, filmmaker Michael Moore visited Occupy Portland protesters and delivered a speech at Terry Schrunk Plaza. Schrunk Plaza is federally-owned property located next to Chapman and Lownsdale squares, Occupy Portland's main campsites. Ten protesters were arrested for camping at Terry Schrunk Plaza due to a city order prohibiting protesters from expanding their campsites to other city parks. In documents obtained by Judicial Watch, it was revealed that someone within the Obama White House instructed the General Services Administration (GSA) to not arrest Occupy Portland protesters who had broken the law on GSA-owned federal land; this is counter to previous denials by the Obama White House.

=== Relationship with city officials ===
Video of the protest

Portland's protesters have sought amicable relations with police, city officials and others in the community. Although the protesters failed to obtain a permit for their October 6 March, or for their subsequent rally in Pioneer Courthouse Square, they avoided confrontation with police by stressing a willingness to keep the march and rally peaceful and under control. They succeeded and no arrests were made.

On October 7, the protesters entered negotiations with city officials and Portland police to remain in Lownsdale and Chapman squares. At issue was that the city had granted a permit to the Portland Marathon to assemble in Lownsdale Square on October 9. Protesters agreed to consolidate into Chapman Square, and began negotiating with city, police, and marathon officials over security requirements. On October 8, protesters reached an agreement with the marathon, city and police, and several hundred protesters marched behind marathon runners on October 9. Portland Marathon officials declared the day a success, and event director Les Smith asserted that "the Occupy Portland people have been a godsend for us."

On October 21, Portland Police released crime statistics (including the criminal arrests of the Occupy Portland protesters) that "showed an 81 percent spike in crime compared to the two weeks before the protest started ... Police said between Oct. 6 and 20, there were 11 arrests for vandalism and 16 for disorderly conduct". In the previous two weeks only 2 arrests for each crime occurred. The figures, along with assertions of poor hygiene at the Occupy campsite, were later cited by city officials as justifications for clearing the camp.

==== Eviction ====
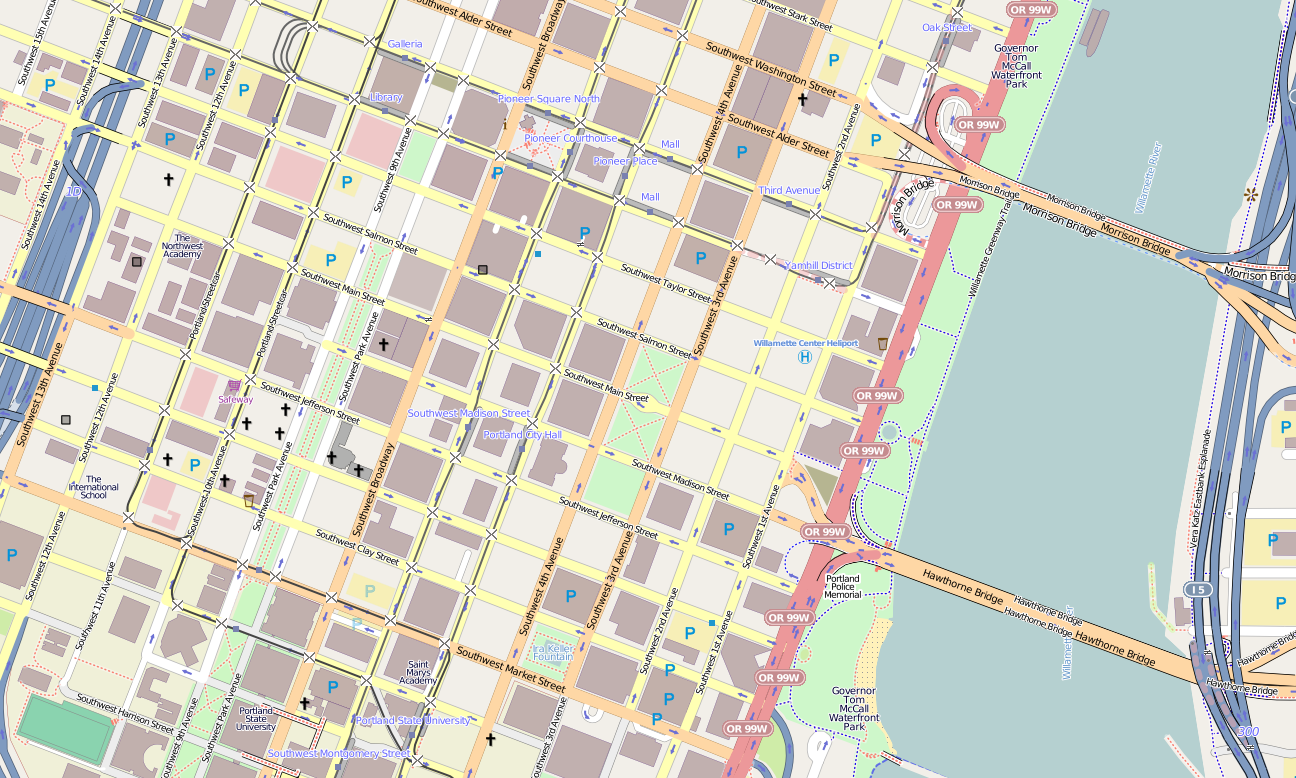
Map of downtown Portland, showing where the protesters camped

At 12:01 AM on November 13, Adams gave the order for the Portland Police Bureau to clear out and dismantle the park. Roughly 70% of the campers left promptly, though the remaining 30% stayed. In the following hours, thousands of Portlanders arrived to see events unfold. some Portlanders came in support of the protesters and others came to see how the police would end the occupation. During the night, the police both advanced and pulled back twice with reports of scattered violence. A mounted police officer's horse stepped on a person's foot, a policeman was hit by a firework, and another policeman was hit with a water bottle.

Riot police eventually shut down the protest, arresting dozens. Some protesters claimed excessive force on the part of the police. The police threatened to use chemical agents and impact weapons if the protesters did not disperse. Ultimately, though, the eviction was less violent than in other cities. The police action was streamed live online and received global press coverage.

Soon after dawn, the police were able to sweep away and dismantle most of the tents in the encampment. A group retook the northwest corner of Chapman Square until riot police physically took over the area around noon.

Though the camp was destroyed, the showdown was claimed as a victory by Occupy Portland because the police were pushed back twice and their deadline for dismantling the camp was not met. The group also pointed to the largely nonviolent nature of the downtown protest camp throughout its existence and its ultimate removal.

The city subsequently built a chain-link fence around the two squares to prevent protesters from returning to the camp site. In the evening of November 13, protesters re-formed on Main Street, one block west of the original encampment. The police broke up the assembly.

== Post-eviction activities ==
=== Picket of the Port of Portland ===
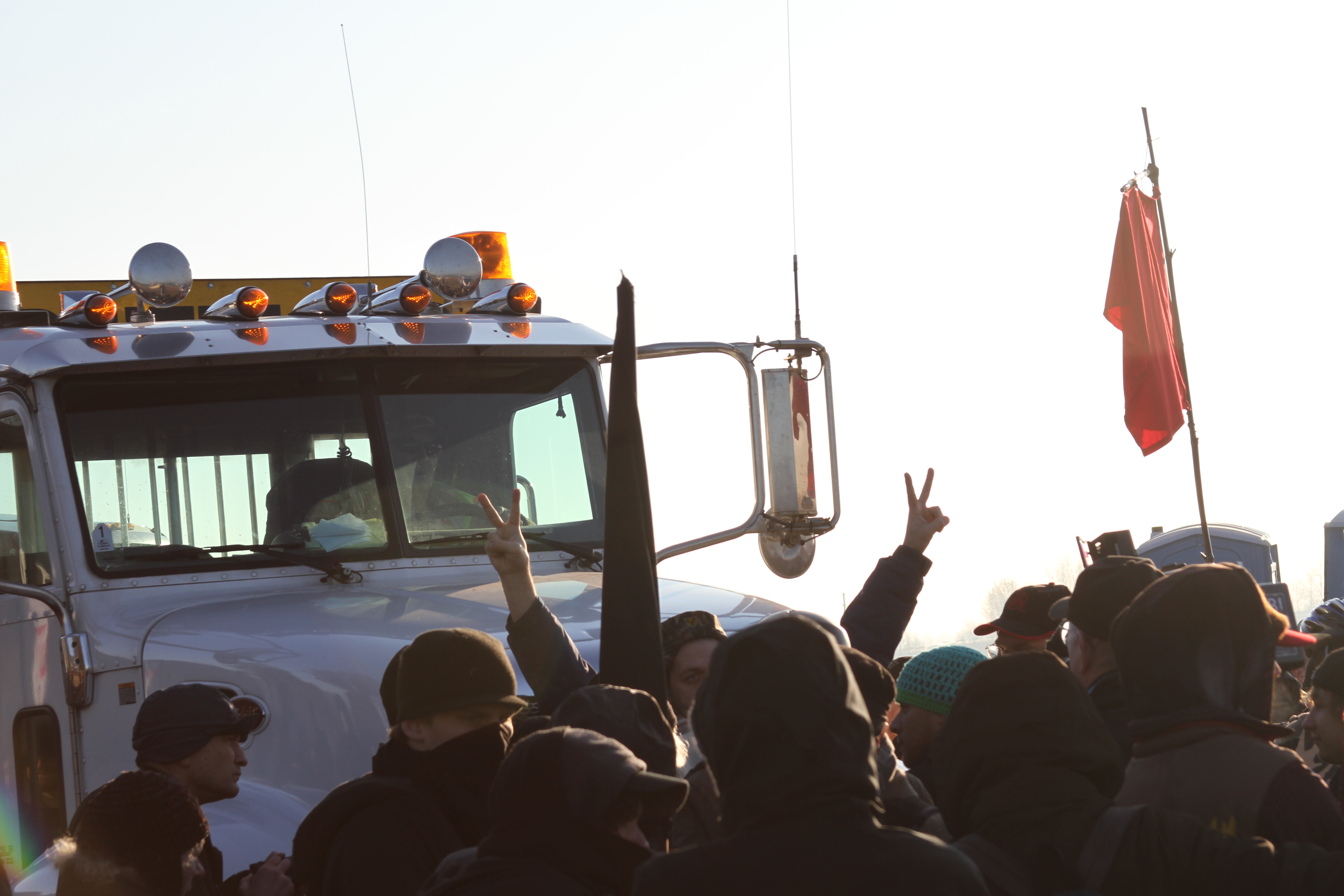
Protesters block a truck trying to enter Terminal 5 of the Port of Portland

On December 12, Occupy Portland led a picket of the Port of Portland that was part of a broader action by the Occupy movement to disrupt commercial ports on the West Coast of the United States. The picket successfully shut down Terminals 5 and 6 and prevented 200 longshoremen from reaching work for the morning shift. The Occupy movement said that SSA Marine, a marine terminal operations company whose owner, Carix, is partially owned by Goldman Sachs, was a target of the protest. EGT, an international grains exporter owned by Bunge Limited, was also mentioned. Although the protesters claimed solidarity with International Longshore and Warehouse Union (ILWU) Local 21 in Longview and highlighted the plight of non-unionized truckers, the protests were not endorsed by and received some criticism from local ILWU chapters and individual truckers.

=== Protests in Downtown Portland ===
Occupy Portland splinter group Portland Action Lab organized a protest in downtown Portland on February 29, 2012, to protest the activities of the American Legislative Exchange Council (ALEC). A wave of vandalism inspired by the action hit businesses in Northeast and Southeast Portland the night prior to the protest. Targets included a U.S. Bank branch and an ATM.

The movement organized another downtown protest on March 13, 2012, to oppose H.R. 347. The resolution, passed by the House earlier that week, placed restrictions on public gatherings on federal property and adjacent land.

=== 24/7 Prayer Vigil to Lift the Camping Ban ===
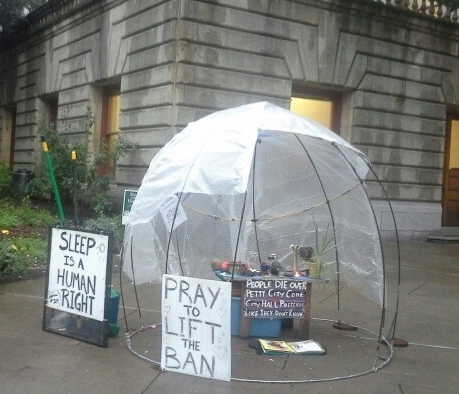
Occupy Portland 24/7 Prayer Vigil, November 2012

On December 1, 2011, a small group of evicted activists from Occupy Portland encampment set up a table on the plaza of the Portland City Hall and lit a candle, and called it 24/7 Prayer Vigil to Lift the Camping Ban, to draw attention to the city's anti-camping ordinances that were cited during the Occupy Portland eviction. They said that the laws, which prohibit the use of "bedding, sleeping bags, or other sleeping matter," are immoral and that they were obligated to challenge them. The demonstrators claimed that sleep was a fundamental human right; that it was essential for mental, physical and emotional health, adding that human beings spend close to a third of their lives sleeping. They argued that prohibiting sleep by making it illegal for people to protect themselves and their belongings from the elements would cause sleep deprivation; that it is inhumane, unconstitutional, and amounts to torture. The demonstrators said that the "prayer vigil" would stay on the plaza until "bedding matter" is again legal. The vigil was staffed around the clock until July 23, 2013, when Mayor Charlie Hales ordered the removal of the vigil and associated encampments on the abutting sidewalks.

The vigil continued uninterrupted for 600 days, making this one of the only active encampments in the Occupy movement that survived well into the second year.

=== 2013 Summer Capacity-Building Conference ===
On August 16 and 17, 2013, Occupy Portland's Information Team hosted a two-day conference "Towards Year Three: Effective Mobilizing and Community Organizing in the Post-Occupy Era," at St. Francis of Assisi Catholic Church in Buckman, Portland, Oregon, with a film screening, several workshops, and plenary sessions.

The conference led to the creation of a spin-off organization, 99 Unite Civic Forum, who describes its purpose as building "a vehicle for collaboration towards a common vision, drawing strengths and wisdoms of conservatives, moderates, and progressives alike...to be a voice of moderation and conscience that puts people before politics" in the "age of increasing polarization."

== Friends of Occupy Portland ==
On April 19, 2012, Friends of Occupy Portland (FOOP) was incorporated as a non-profit corporation in the State of Oregon, with "the purposes to raise and provide funds to promote the common good and general welfare of the community, educate the general public on current public-interest issues and encourage increased civic engagement, advocate viewpoints on controversial subjects, and to take direct action on these subjects when such activity is beneficial to the community's public interest," according to its articles of incorporation, and "to provide logistical support to various civic engagement and public education efforts by individuals and groups started by, or associated with the 'Occupy Portland' movement, primarily through disseminating information and operating outreach and assembly facilities," according to its filing with the Oregon Department of Justice.

In April 2013, FOOP had unsuccessfully sought a lease of an office building from a local real estate mogul Joe Weston, while also developing a more "sophisticated" and "business-like" approach centered on economic justice.

General Assembly attendance plummeted during 2013, and on December 11, 2013, the Occupy Portland General Assembly was formally abolished, and thereby signifying the formal end of the Occupy Portland organization.

On October 25, 2014, FOOP held a three-year anniversary panel discussion forum at the Multnomah County Central Library, considering Occupy Portland's "successes, mistakes, fond memories and lessons learned."

== See also ==
- Economic inequality
- Empowered democracy
- Grassroots movement
- List of global Occupy protest locations
- Income inequality in the United States
- Plutocracy – rule by the wealthy, or power provided by wealth
- Tea Party protests
- Wealth inequality in the United States
