= Plaza Blocks =

Pair of public parks in Portland, Oregon, U.S.

Lownsdale Square & Chapman Square
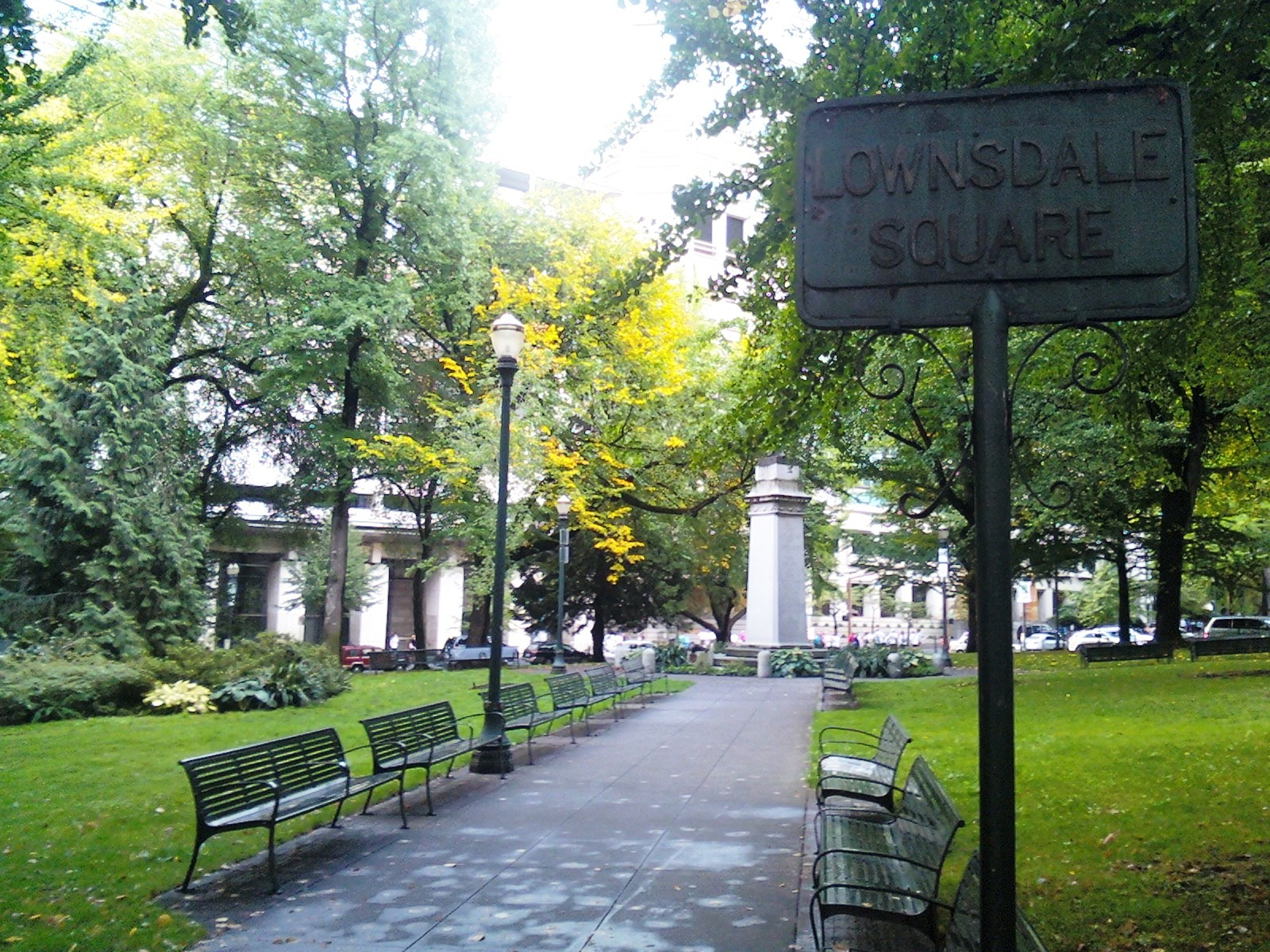
- Lownsdale Square
- Interactive map of Lownsdale Square & Chapman Square
- Location: Portland, Oregon, United States
- Coordinates: 45.515721°N 122.677485°W

The Plaza Blocks, two courthouse squares known as Chapman Square and Lownsdale Square, are located in downtown Portland, Oregon, United States. The blocks, as well as the adjacent Terry Schrunk Plaza, are surrounded by multiple government buildings including City Hall, the Green - Wyatt Federal Building, the Portland Building, the Multnomah County Justice Center, the Hatfield United States Courthouse, and the old Multnomah County Courthouse.

== History ==
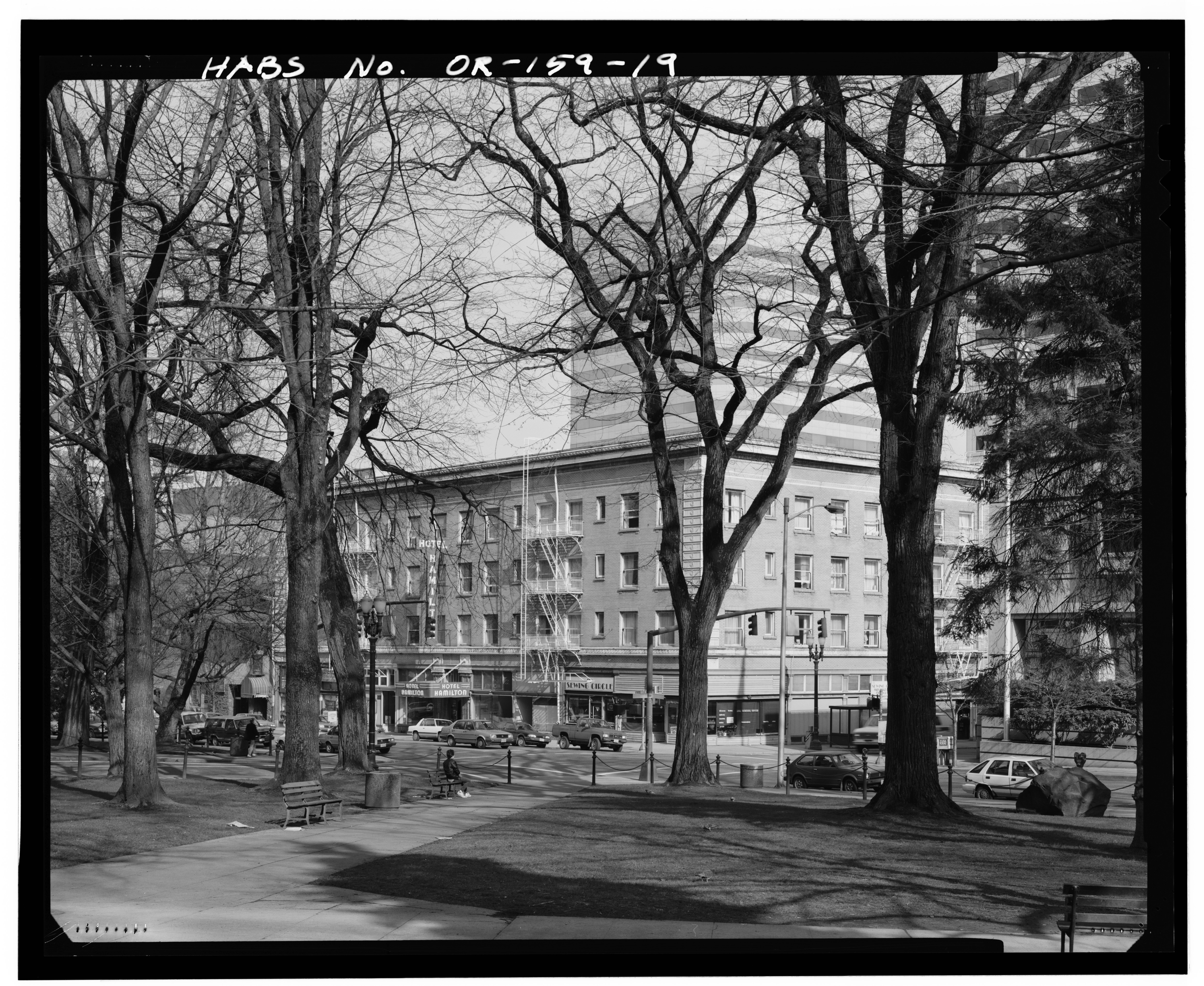
Chapman Square, circa 1993

The northernmost square is named after Daniel H. Lownsdale (1803—1862), a native Kentuckian who settled in Portland in 1845. The south square is named after legislator William W. Chapman (1808–1892), a Virginian who settled in Portland in 1850. Both Lownsdale and Chapman were some of Portland's first landowners.

The blocks were initially segregated by gender. Lownsdale Square for men and Chapman Square, planted with a grove of female ginkgo trees, for women. Public speakers and preachers used the parks for their speeches. By 1900, Lownsdale Square was a gay cruising destination, allowing a degree of deniability. This activity also took place in Chapman Square by the 1950s. Evidence of the gender segregation still exists to some extent. The public men's and women's restrooms are still located in their respective blocks, and the monuments in each respective square are focused more on traditionally male vs female interests.

The first electric power transmission line in North America terminated at Chapman Square. It went online at 10:00 pm on June 3, 1889, operating at 4,000 volts of direct current, with the lines between the electric generating station at Willamette Falls in Oregon City, Oregon, and downtown Portland stretching about 13 miles. A bronze tablet in the park commemorates this achievement.

The Plaza Blocks, as well as the adjacent Terry Schrunk Plaza, are frequent hotspots for protests and civil unrest. Many people participating in the 2011 Occupy Portland protests used the parks to camp in. The 2020 George Floyd protests were centered on the parks and caused significant damage to the memorials and features of the park. The damage led to the removal of the Thompson Elk Fountain and The Promised Land. The Elk Fountain is set to be replaced in 2024.

== Monuments ==
Name	Memorial or Monument to	Date installed/built	Sculpted/built by	Notes
Thompson Elk Fountain		1900	Roland Hinton Perry	Donated by Mayor David P. Thompson. The statue was removed after the base was damaged by a fire cause by protestors during the 2020 George Floyd protests. It is set to be replaced in 2024.
Spanish–American War Soldier's Monument	'2nd Oregon Volunteer Infantry Regiment', Spanish–American War	1906	Douglas Tilden	The base of the monument features 2 Howitzers used in the defense of Fort Sumter. One cannon faces north and the other south to symbolize that they were used by both Union and Confederate forces.
Fountain for Company H	Company H, '2nd Oregon Volunteer Infantry Regiment', Spanish–American War and Philippine–American War	1914	John H. Beaver	
First High-Tension Power Line Plaque		1962		This plaque memorializes the first electric power transmission line in North America. The first transmission occurred at 10:00 pm on June 3, 1889. Placed by the Lang Syne Society, a civic group known for placing plaques on historic figures and events.
William W. Chapman Plaque	William W. Chapman, Legislator, Attorney, and Surveyor General of Oregon	1991		Placed by the Lang Syne Society, a civic group known for placing plaques on historic figures and events.
Daniel H. Lownsdale Plaque	Daniel H. Lownsdale, Legislator and Tanner	1991		Placed by the Lang Syne Society, a civic group known for placing plaques on historic figures and events.
The Promised Land	Oregon Pioneers/Settlers	1993	David Manuel	The statue was removed after it was damaged by protestors during the 2020 George Floyd protests. It is currently unknown if it will be replaced.

== Gallery ==
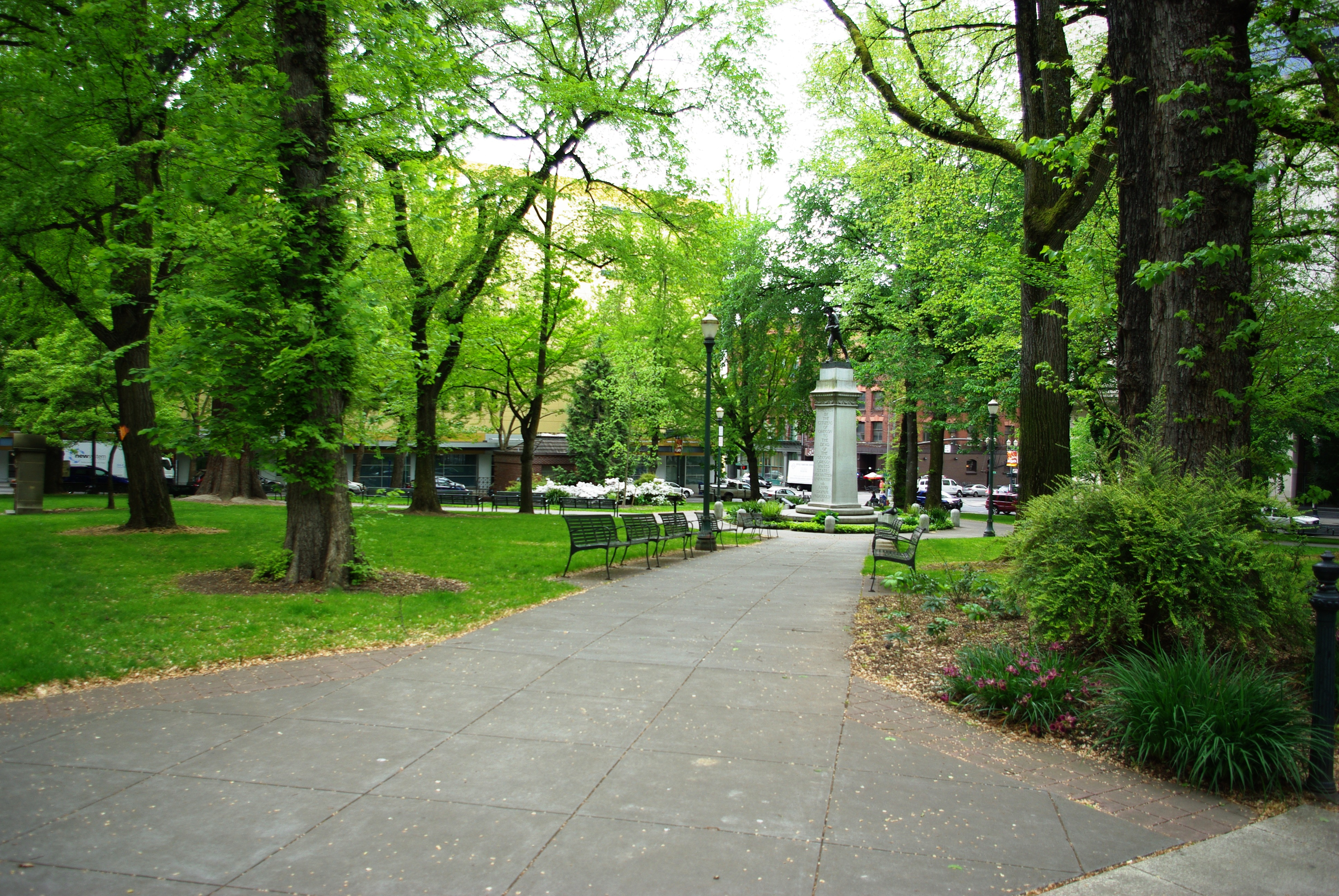
Lownsdale Square

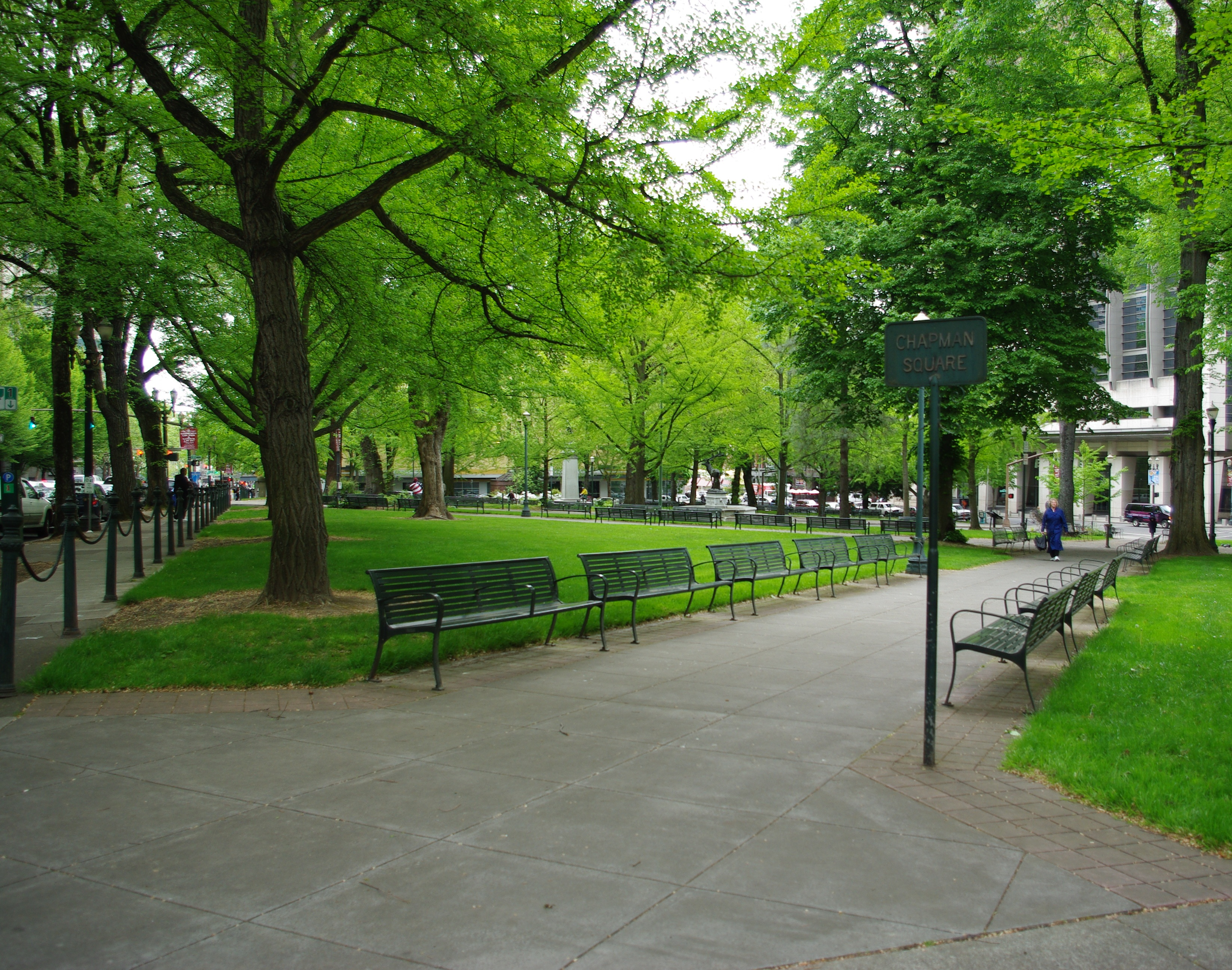
Chapman Square

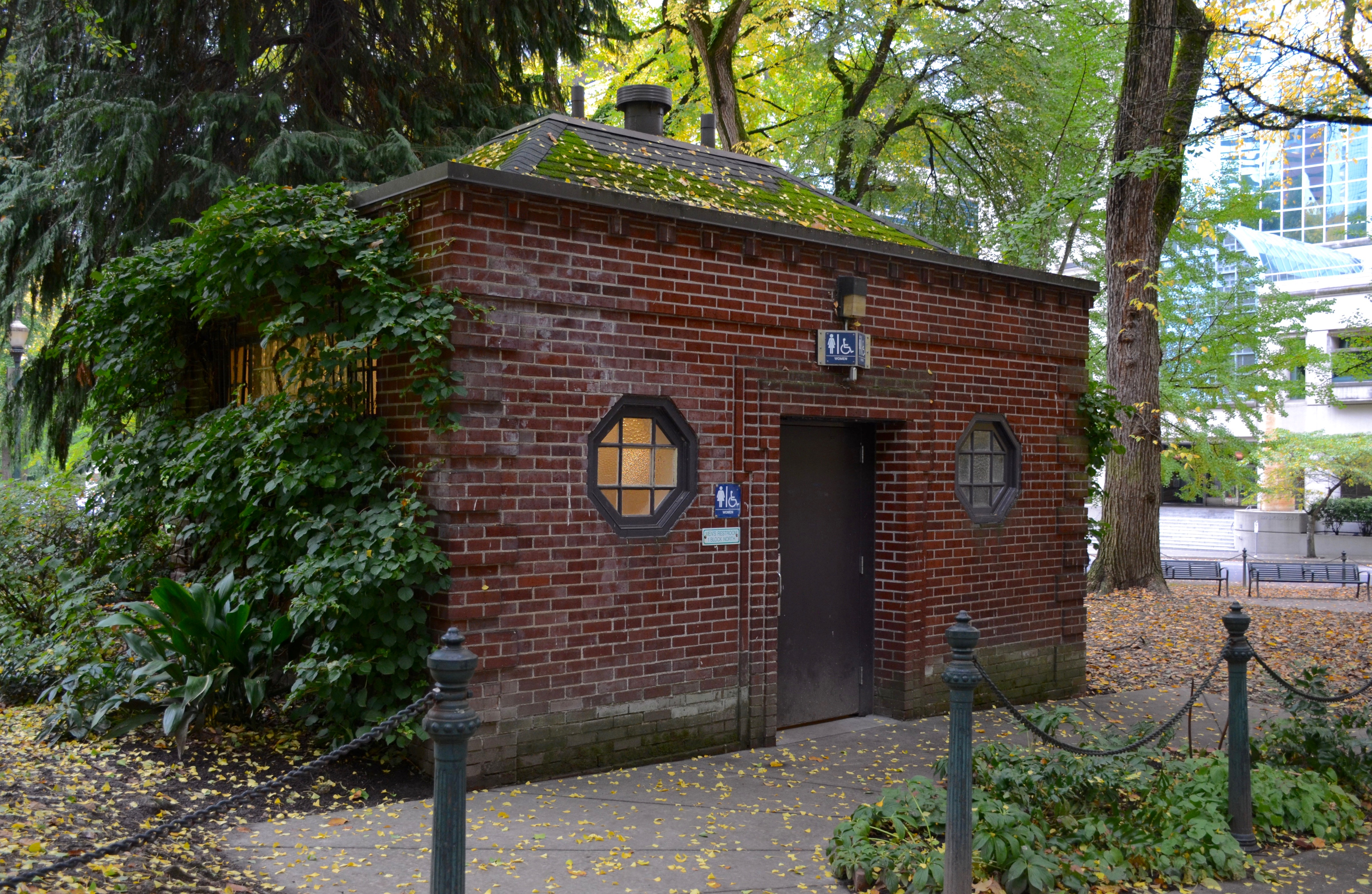
One of the restroom buildings

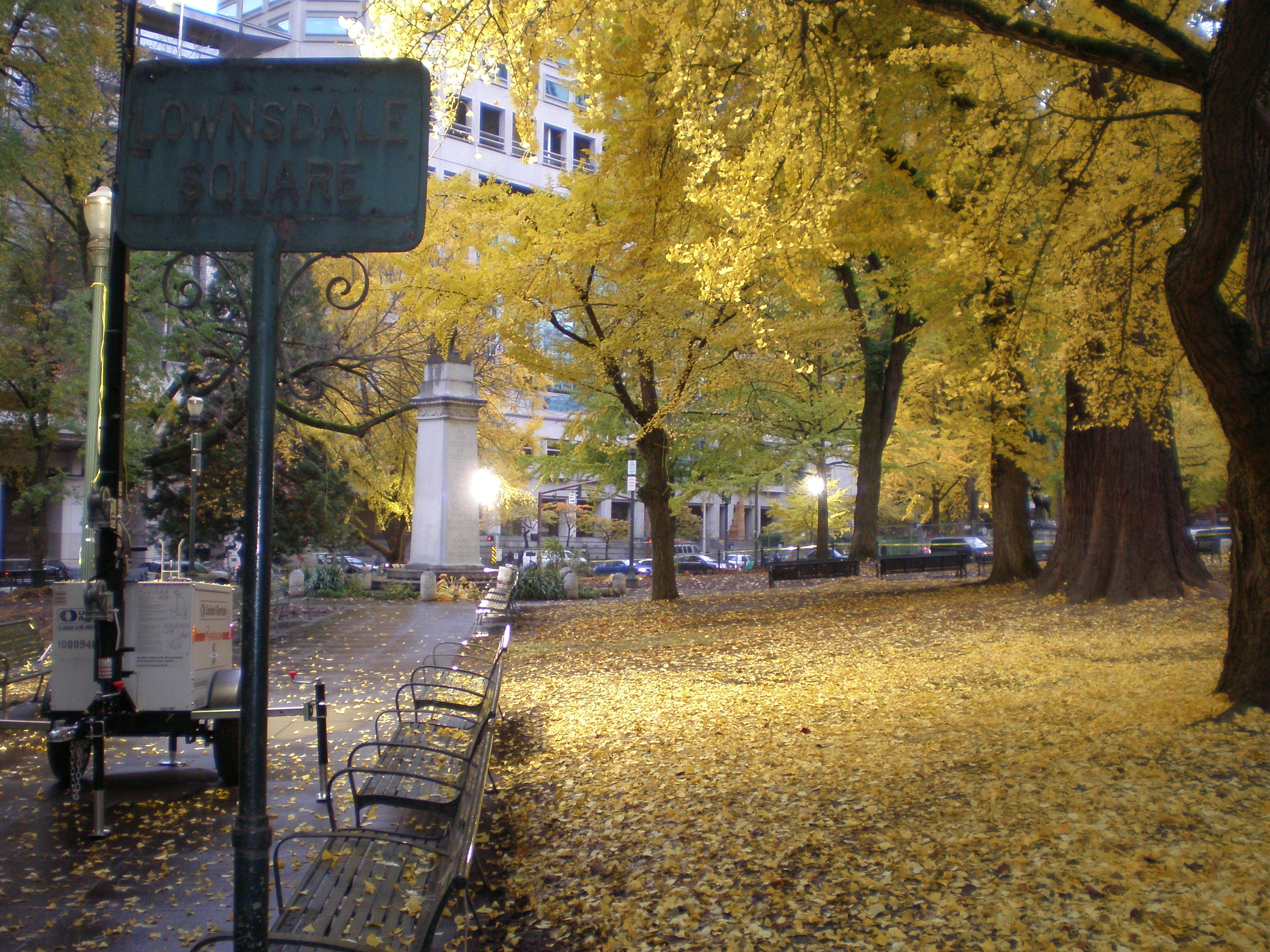
Lownsdale Square, 2011

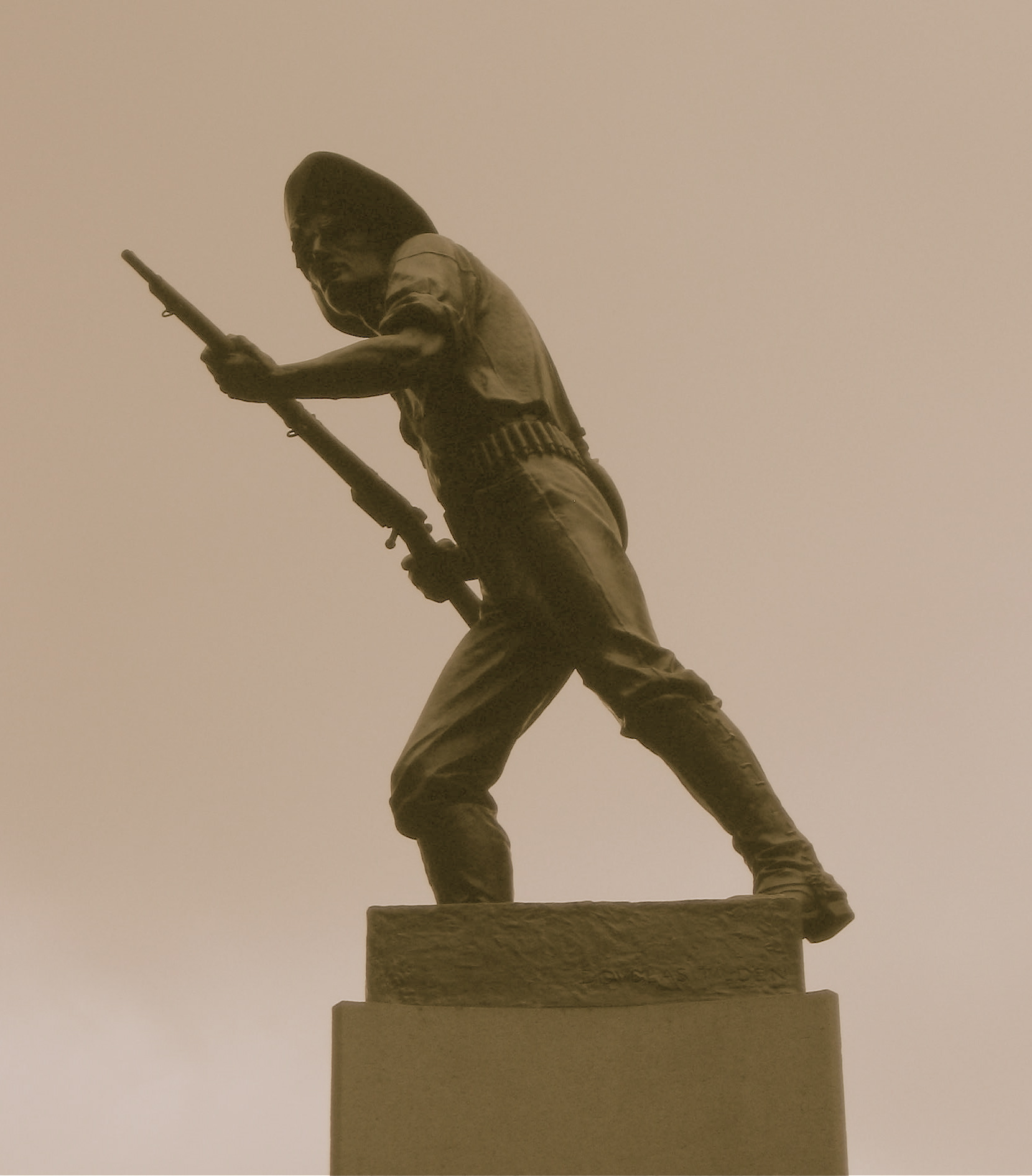
Top of the Spanish-American War Soldier's Monument

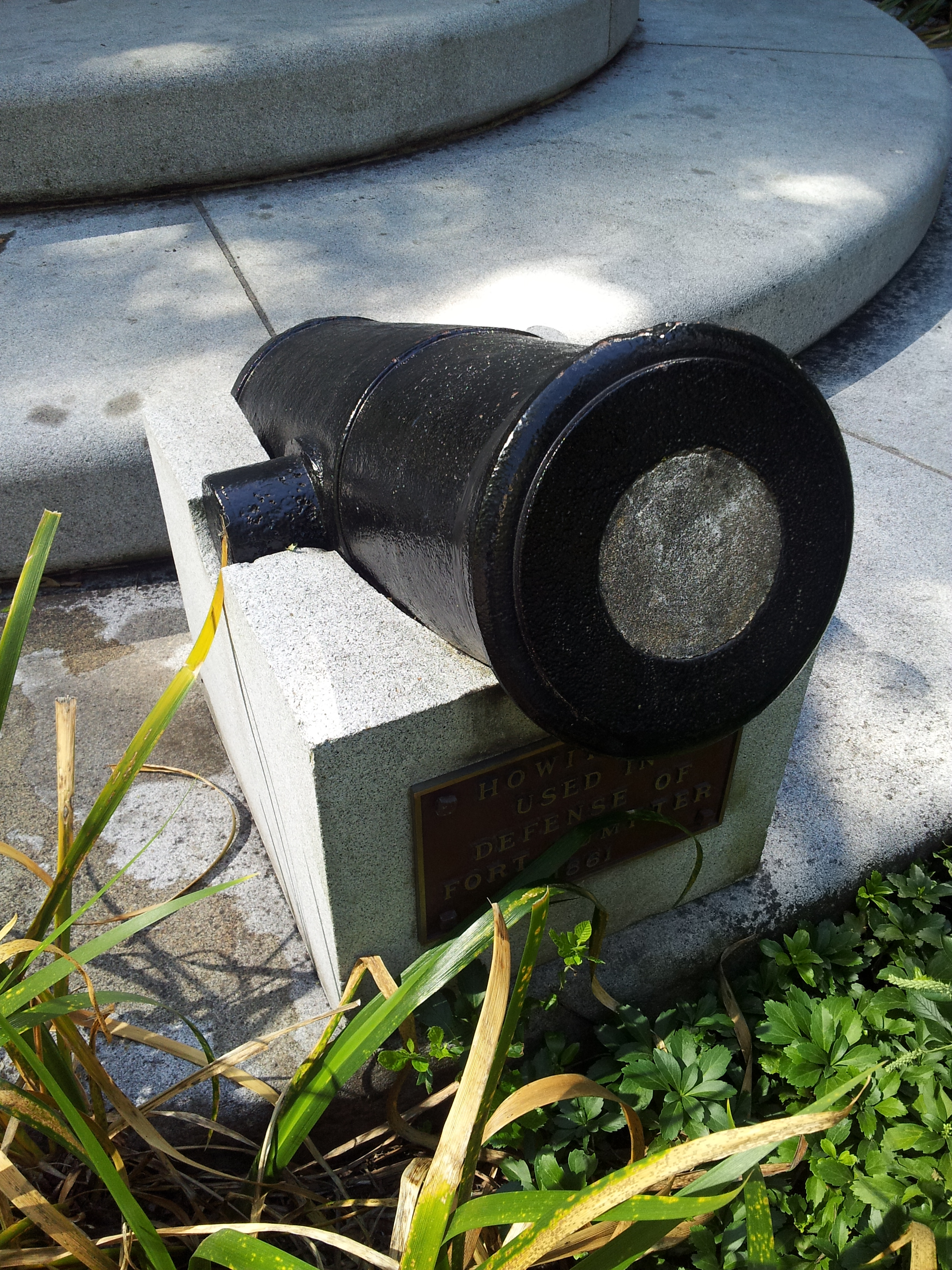
One of the Fort Sumter Howitzers on the base of the Spanish-American War Soldier's Monument

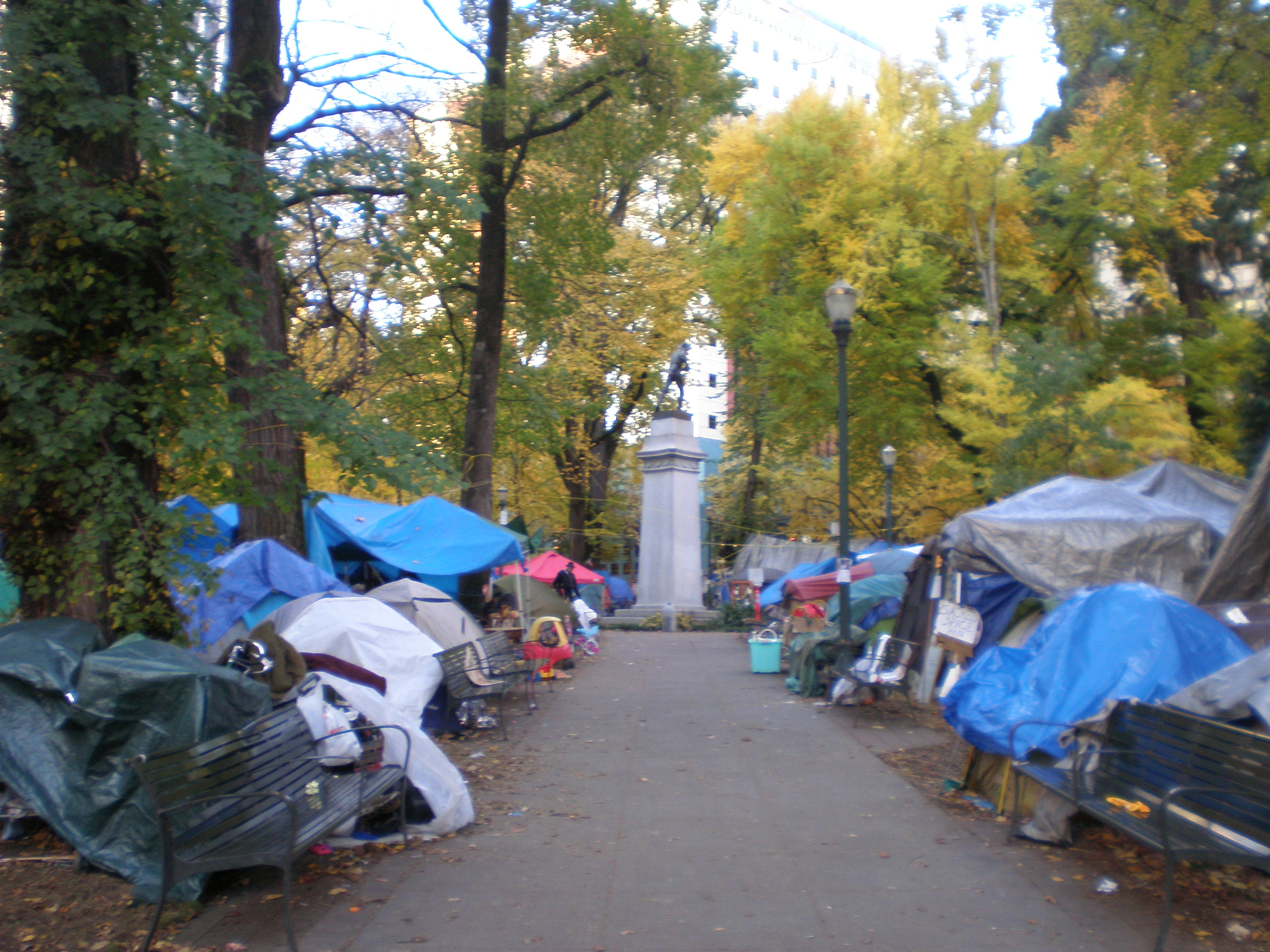
Occupy Portland camp-in, 2011

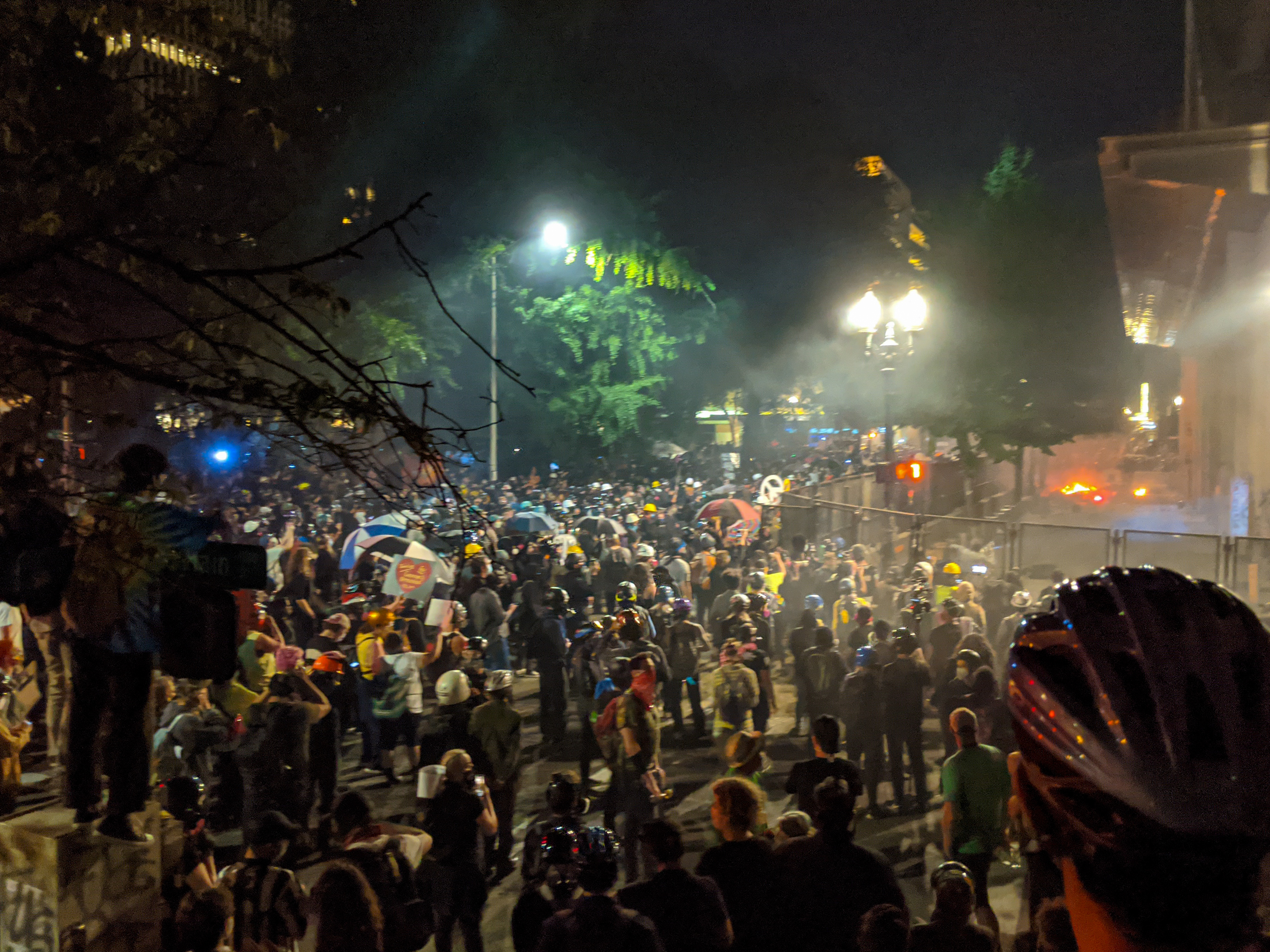
Protest following the murder of George Floyd, 2020
