= Leo Friedlander =

American sculptor (1888–1966)

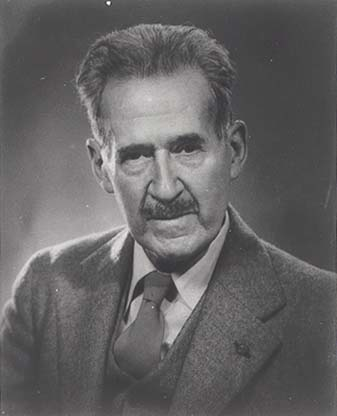
- Born: July 6, 1888; New York City, U.S.
- Died: October 24, 1966 (aged 78); White Plains, New York, U.S.
- Known for: Sculpture

Leo Friedlander (July 6, 1888 – October 24, 1966) was an American sculptor, who created several prominent works.

== Early life and education ==
At 12 years old, Friedlander studied at the Art Students League in New York City. In 1908, he traveled to Europe, where he studied at the Ecole des Beaux Arts in Brussels and Paris, returning to work in New York City in 1911. In 1913, he was awarded a three-year fellowship to the American Academy in Rome, where he honed his skills and explored classical works, while also teaching, until returning to New York City.

== Career ==
Following the end of WWI, Friedlander spent time working as an assistant to each of Hermon Atkins MacNeil and Paul Manship, while stating to attract independent commissions for his own work. When Cass Gilbert designed the U.S. Chamber of Commerce Building, completed in 1925 in Washington, D.C., he commissioned Friedlander to produce twenty-six relief panels to be included in the project. In 1930, he received a commission to design models for Sacrifice and Valor, two statues known collectively as The Arts of War, to flank the planned Washington, D.C. Arlington Memorial Bridge. The bridge was completed in 1932, while debate over the planned statues continued; the models were finalized in 1933, but the impact of the Great Depression, followed by WWII, meant that the statues were not cast until 1950, and erected in 1951.

By 1935, his growing number of commissions, coupled with the shear physical size of the public works he was creating, led Friedlander to move his studio from New York City to a larger space in nearby White Plains, New York.

In addition to large public works, Friedlander also created smaller pieces for private sale, such as his 22 in (56 cm) tall Female Warrior, designed c. 1916, while still on his fellowship to the American Academy in Rome.

He took on commissions into his 70s, such as the Christ statue, at the entrance to Wesley Theological Seminary in Washington, D.C., completed in 1960.

== Academia and appointments ==
In 1936, Frielander was elected into the National Academy of Design as an Associate member, and became a full Academician in 1949. During WWII, he headed the sculpture department at New York University, within the then named New York University School of Architecture. In 1954, he was chosen for a three-year term as president of the National Sculpture Society.

== Personal life ==
Friedlander was married to Rhoda Freda Lichter, for whom he sculpted a portrait in monumental marble portrait, Rhoda Freda Friedlander; the couple and had two children. He died in 1966, at age 78, in White Plains.

== Public works ==
- Sculptures on the National Memorial Arch at Valley Forge National Historical Park, Upper Merion Township, Pennsylvania (dedicated 1917)
- Reliefs for the U.S. Chamber of Commerce Building, Washington, D.C. (1925)
- The central pediment at the Museum of the City of New York (1930)
- Sculpted reliefs, Jefferson County Courthouse, Birmingham, Alabama (1931)
- Pylons, Social Science Building, Century of Progress International Exposition, Chicago (1932; dismantled 1934, with entire exposition grounds)
- Covered Wagon sculptural panels, Oregon State Capitol, Salem, OR (1934)
- Lewis and Clark sculptural panels, Oregon State Capitol, Salem, OR (1934)
- Pioneer Woman Statue, Texas Woman's University, Denton, TX (1938)
- Reliefs on the RCA Building at Rockefeller Center, New York City (1939)
- Roger Williams Statue, Prospect Terrace Park, Providence, RI (1939)
- Four Freedoms statues, Religion, Speech, Press, and Assembly, New York World's Fair (1939; dismantled 1940s, with significant portion of the pavilions and works)
- The Arts of War statues, Sacrifice and Valor, flanking the Arlington Memorial Bridge in Washington, D.C. (models 1933, cast 1950)
- Harmony bronze medal, commissioned by Society of Medalists (1949), gifted to Metropolitan Museum of Art, New York City (1950)
- Memory, Virginia War Memorial, Richmond, VA (1956)
- Christ statue, Wesley Theological Seminary, Washington, D.C. (1960)
- Relief of angel, and the bronze doors with eight panels below it, on the memorial at Luxembourg American Cemetery and Memorial, Hamm, Luxembourg (dedicated 1960)
- Sculptured Clock, House of Representatives, Capitol Building, Washington, D.C.
- Bacchante, bronze statue, Metropolitan Museum of Art

== Images ==
Arts of War statues at the entrance to the Arlington Memorial Bridge

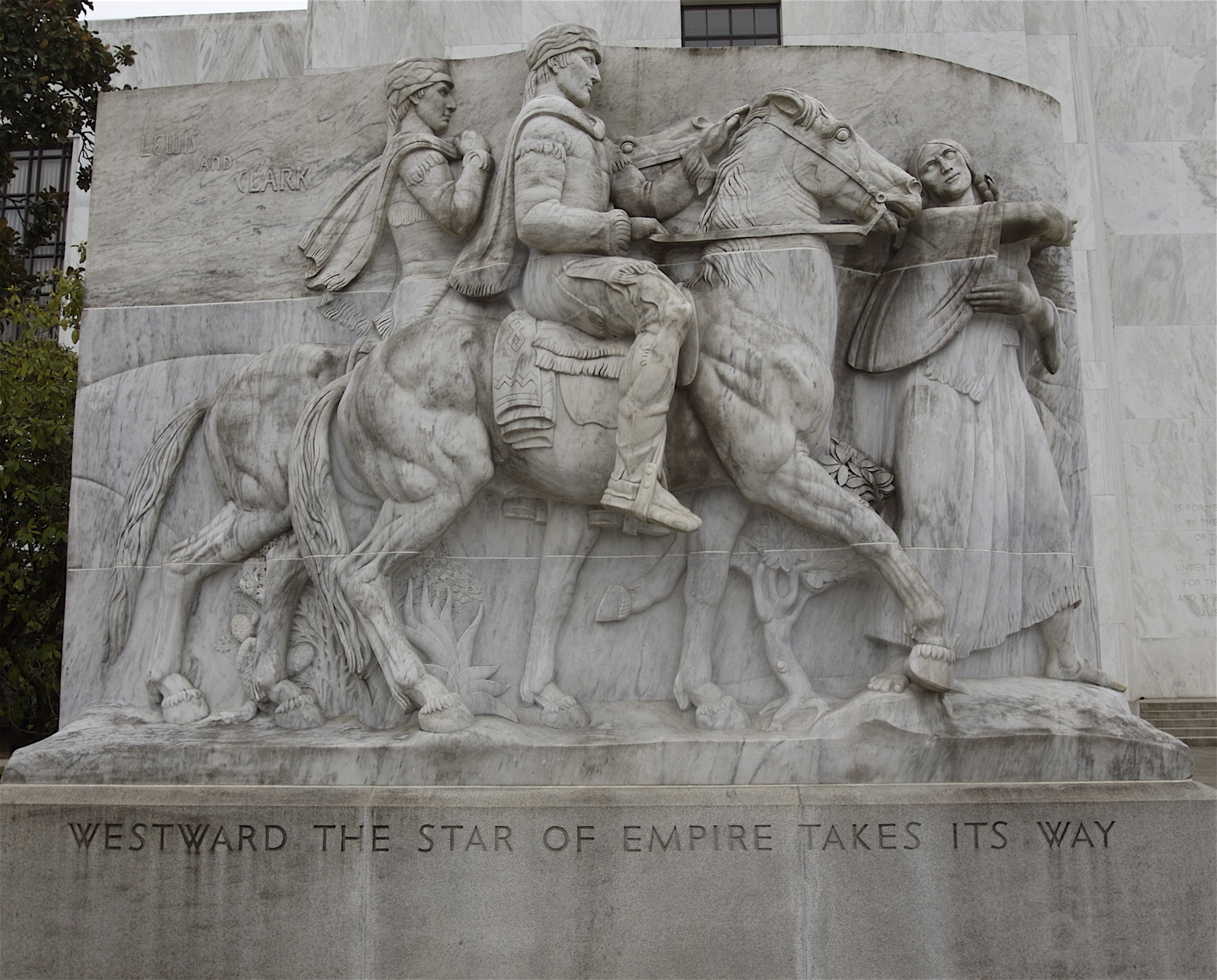
Lewis and Clark, Salem, Oregon

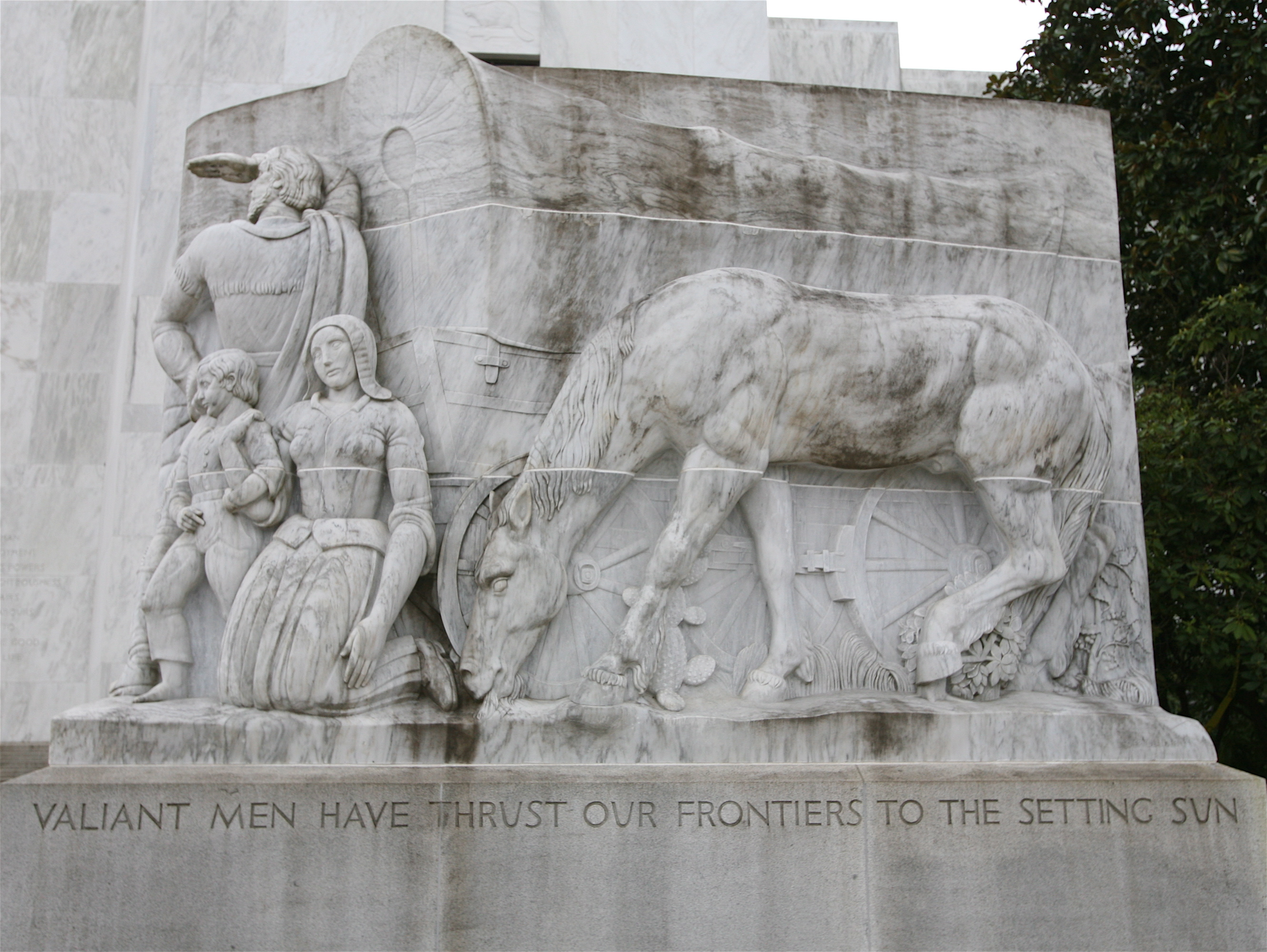
Covered Wagon, Salem, Oregon
