= Lily Furedi =

American painter

- Born: May 20, 1896; Budapest, Hungary (Note: Some reference sources give Budapest as her birthplace, but both her younger sister, Anna, and her father were born in Debrecen.)
- Died: November 1969 (Note: Furedi died between November 1 and 7, 1969. A death notice placed in The New York Times on the latter date has the following text: "Furedi, Lily, beloved aunt of Agnes Kraus, also survived by cousins. Private services held Friday, Nov. 7th 1969.") (aged 73); New York City, New York
- Notable work: The Subway (1934); The Village (1931); After the Masquerade (1934)
- Movement: Realism, impressionism
- Spouse: Morris Teplitzky (m. 1929–1930)

Lily Furedi (May 20, 1896 – November 1969) was a Hungarian-American artist, whose original Hungarian name was Füredi Lili. A native of Budapest, she achieved national recognition for her 1934 painting, The Subway, a sympathetic portrayal of passengers in a New York subway car. Light-hearted in tone, the painting depicts a cross-section of city dwellers from the viewpoint of a fellow commuter.

== Artistic career ==
When Lili Furedi was 31 years old, she debarked from the ship Cellina at the port of Los Angeles. She came from Budapest by way of Trieste and on the ship's manifest she reported her occupation as painter. (Note: Furedi was the only alien listed on the manifest of the S.S. Cellina from Trieste. She had obtained a visa to enter the United States in Budapest on November 24, 1927. She reported that she was unmarried and could read and write in German and English as well as Hungarian.) There is no record of art training she may have received either before or after her arrival in the United States. There is no doubt she was working as a professional artist, however, because in 1931 she won a prize for her painting, The Village, at the annual Christmas show held by the National Association of Women Painters and Sculptors at the Argent Gallery in January of that year. (Note: This Christmas show was not the regular annual exhibition of the National Association of Women Painters and Sculptors (which, in 1931, was the 40th), but rather a show of small paintings, sculptures, crafts, and miniatures which had opened in December 1930 at the Argent Gallery in the association's headquarters building on West 57th Street in New York.) In 1932 and for much of the rest of the decade she placed paintings in group exhibitions, including: (1) a 1932 exhibition by Hungarian-American artists in which she showed works called Hungarian Village and Hungarian Farm, (2) a 1935 exhibition of the National Association of Women Painters and Sculptors in which she showed a painting called Interior, (3) a 1936 exhibition by the New York Municipal Art Committee, and (4) a 1937 exhibition at the Woman's Club of Glen Ridge, New Jersey.

Reviewing the 43rd annual Women Painters and Sculptors show of 1934, Edward Alden Jewell of The New York Times called attention to a painting of Furedi's entitled The Interesting Book which he included with paintings by three other artists as "unhappily deliberate attempts to be 'modern' at all costs." In contrast, the New York Sun chose another of Furedi's paintings, called After the Masquerade, as the sole illustration accompanying its review of the exhibition. (Note: The exhibition was spread over several galleries. Furedi's painting was hung in the Argent Gallery.) In reviewing another exhibition held in 1934, the critic, C.H. Bonte, listed Furedi within a group of artists considered to be among the "best known" of American women "who have gained high recognition" for their work. (Note: The exhibition was held in January 1934 at the Plastic Club in Philadelphia, Pennsylvania.)

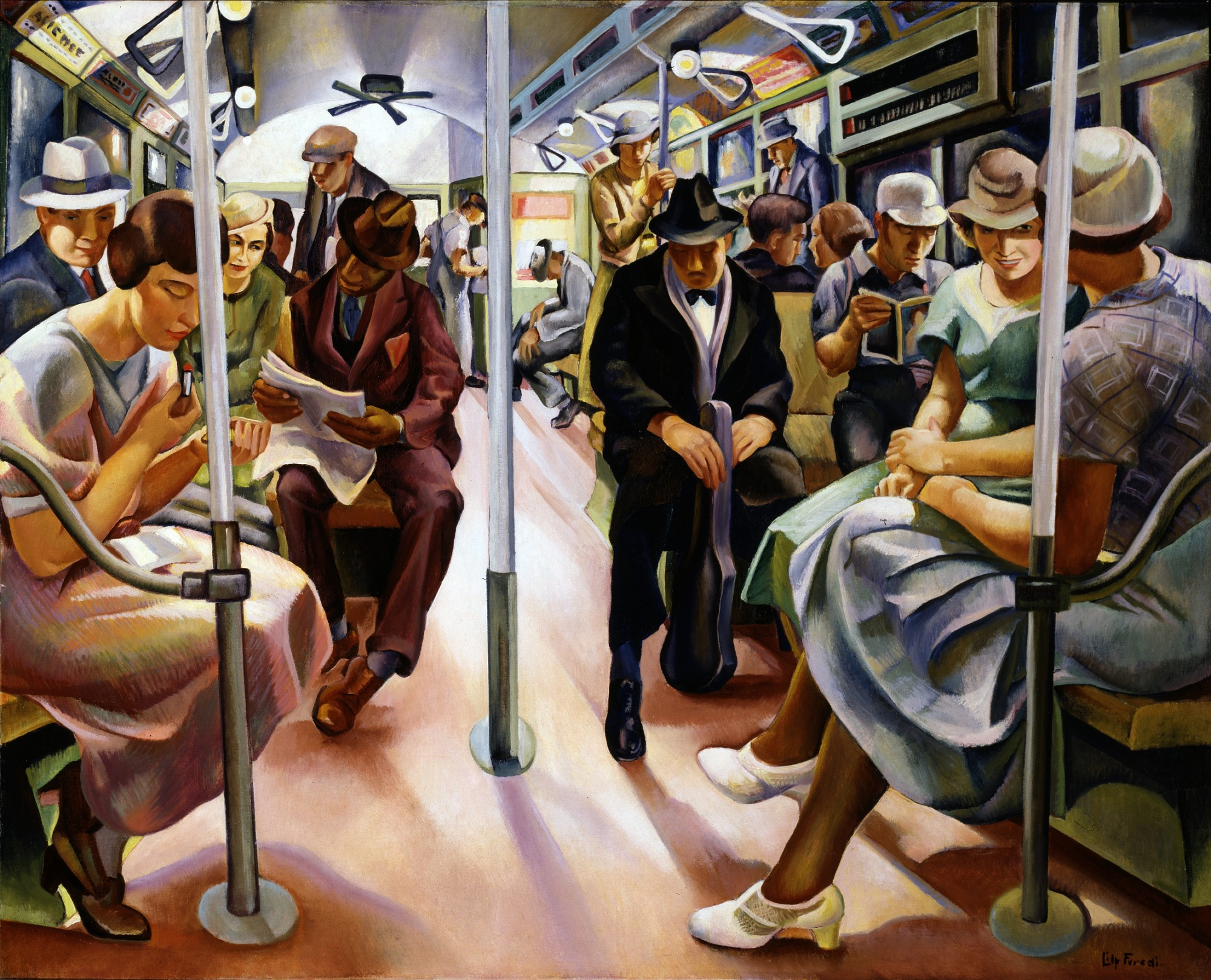
Lily Furedi, The Subway, 1934, oil on canvas, 39 x 48 1/4 in. (99.1 x 122.6 cm.), created for the U.S. Public Works of Art Project

Early in 1934 Furedi was accepted into the Public Works of Art Project. This pioneering federal program employed artists at craftsmen's wages to make pictures on the theme of "the American scene." (Note: This short-lived project resulted in the creation of over 15,000 easel paintings and murals from 3,671 artists in every region of the country. Furedi's contribution was one of 500 works chosen to be exhibited first in a show at the Corcoran Gallery of Art in Washington, D.C. and subsequently circulated to other museums around the country. A newspaper critic wrote that "In all, it is announced, 3,671 artists have been employed, for varying periods, under the PWAP, receiving craftsman's wages of from $23.50 to $42.50 a week. The total allotment to carry out the project has amounted to $1,408,381.") Her contribution to the project was the painting called The Subway. The picture was one of twenty-five selected for presentation as gifts to the White House. It was also in a group that President and Mrs. Roosevelt had themselves selected as being among the best in the show. (Note: In reviewing the exhibition, Edward Alden Jewell wrote: "President and Mrs. Roosevelt spent an hour and a half at the exhibition on Sunday. They personally selected, as particularly good, thirty-two easel paintings—and their list, one learns, includes all of the twenty-five pictures that had previously been selected by Mr. Bruce and the members of his committee, with the idea of presenting them to the White House.") Beginning in 1935, when it accompanied a book review in The New York Times, the painting has frequently been used as an illustration in books, articles, news accounts, and Internet web sites. (Note: Most recently, the painting, The Subway, has appeared in accounts related to a Smithsonian exhibit, "1934: A New Deal for Artists," which has appeared at the Smithsonian American Art Museum and on national tour. Other appearances include a news article on 1930s art, weblog postings, a jigsaw puzzle, and various exhibition reviews.)

In examining Furedi's The Subway, critics and other observers have found much to say. The painting was said to be cheerful and the artist's interest to be sympathetic. It was seen as vibrant, bright, and optimistic. Its scene was said to be playful, clean, and decorous and its design elements as idealistically deployed. One reviewer saw an influence of "Cézanne's cubes and cones" in a scene which tells a compelling story of a projected "society in which sex and race are comfortably, if nervously, aligned" and a poet, using the ekphrastic poetic technique, declared that the painting showed the "best in mass transit," in which "we get to meet, greet, / and saunter through / time and space together." The poem, by Angie Trudell Vasquez, is called "Eyes Alive." It closes: "see what beauty / we can make / when all is lit up with color / warm and welcoming, / beckoning you / into the picture, / offering you a seat."

Following the 1934 touring show in which it appeared, The Subway was not again included in a public exhibition until 1983 when it appeared in "Social Concern and Urban Realism: American Painting of the 1930s" at Gallery 1199 in New York's Martin Luther King Labor Center. It appeared again in "1934: A New Deal for Artists," a touring exhibition put together by the Smithsonian American Art Museum in 2009.

After the Public Works of Art Project was closed down in 1934 Furedi joined the Federal Art Project. She is recorded as being employed in this program in 1937–1939 and, specifically as a muralist, in 1940.

Furedi's work was reviewed infrequently after the mid-1930s. In 1941 she painted an altar mural called The Galley Slave which she donated to a Hungarian church in New York. (Note: Furedi donated the altar mural in memory of her father, Samuel Furedi, a concert cellist who had taught students and performed frequently in New York during the 1920s. The church was the First Magyar Presbyterian Church at 233 E. 116th Street in New York. The painting showed two martyrs of 1677, one of whom was related to the pastor of the church.) In 1950 Furedi showed a decorated piece of pottery in a group exhibition at the Greenwich House Pottery in New York. She died in New York at the age of 73 in November 1969.

== Personal information ==
Furedi was born on May 20, 1896. (Note: 1901 has also been given as her birth year.) Her place of birth was either Debrecen or Budapest. (Note: Some reference sources give Budapest as her birthplace, but both her younger sister, Anna, and her father were born in Debrecen.)

=== Family ===
Her father, Samuel Furedi (1872–1933), was a cello soloist and teacher. (Note: Samuel Furedi's father's name was Elias Friedman. It is not known why his surname was different from his father's. His mother was Elizabeth Friedman. An obituary for Samuel Furedi in The New York Times gives his name as "Sumel") Her mother, Paula Sudfeld Furedi, was a piano teacher at the Debrecen Conservatory, and one of her uncles, Sandor Furedi, was a concert violinist and teacher in New York. Furedi had a brother, Ernest Furedi, who was a merchant in Budapest, and a sister, Anna Furedi, an oral surgeon and director of the laboratory of the New York Institute of Clinical Oral Pathology. (Note: Anna Furedi married Zoltan Kellner in 1928 and John Gustave Codik in 1936.) In 1927, Furedi traveled from Budapest to Los Angeles where her father had a music studio. She recorded her occupation as "painter" on the ship's manifest. (Note: Furedi was the only alien passenger on the ship. In addition to saying she was an artist, she reported that she could speak and read German and English as well as Hungarian.) On May 29, 1929, Furedi married Morris Teplitzky in New York. The marriage certificate states that she was previously unmarried. The marriage did not last long. The U.S. Census for 1930 says she was single and living with her parents in New York. (Note: Her sister Anna and her husband Zoltan Kellner were in the same household when the 1930 census was taken.) She was also recorded as single and living in New York with her mother in the Census for 1940. This report says that Furedi was a naturalized U.S. citizen working for the government doing mural painting in the Federal Art Project of the Works Progress Administration.

=== Death ===
Furedi died between November 1 and 7, 1969. A death notice placed in The New York Times on the latter date has the following text: "Furedi, Lily, beloved aunt of Agnes Kraus, also survived by cousins. Private services held Friday, Nov. 7th 1969."

=== Other names ===
The Furedi surname is sometimes given as Füredi, Fueredi, or Furedy. Furedi's first name has been given as Lilly, Lillie, or Lilian.
