= Stranded Brig =

1934 painting by Edwin Dickinson

Stranded Brig is a painting by the American artist Edwin Dickinson (1891–1978). Painted in oils on a canvas measuring 40 x 50 inches, it was created in 1934 for the federal government's first Depression-era program for artists, the half-year Public Works of Art Project. In October 1934 it entered the collection of the Museum of Fine Arts, Springfield, Massachusetts.

== History ==
In February 1934, Dickinson was invited to participate in the Public Works of Art Project, which offered him weekly pay and an exhibition of the painting in Washington in May. He finished the work on time by reworking an abandoned painting, one of a small group done from imagination on a favorite subject, polar exploration, and changing its title to Stranded Brig. According to art historian John L. Ward, Dickinson's painting had begun life as Loss of the Tegethoff, the third painting of a series on the subject of the stranding of that ship in polar ice, left off after about 15 sittings in the fall of 1930. Ward points out that the size is the same, that it represented "boat, smoke, ice and rocks," and that the tally of sittings Dickinson reported putting in on the painting to date in a letter written 31 March 1934 ("about 40") does not match the number entered in his journals unless the "about 15 sittings" he had put in on the earlier painting are added in. In the final version the ice has disappeared and upended rocks resembling those he had painted in The Glen are present. The picture also contains the skeleton of a whaleboat in the foreground, along with an improbable weasel caught in a trap (lower left), falling rocks (left side), and a dangling walkway (left side) and steps (lower right), that Dickinson said were like those at Watkins Glen, New York, or some such place for tourists.

== Analysis ==
Adler's identification of the stranded ship with the artist, "crushed by life's vicissitudes", is based on his mistaking the mists, produced, according to Dickinson, by much colder air coming into contact with the warmer water, for a representation of a violent storm tearing the ship apart. But evidence, both internal and external, support Adler's interpretation: the upended rocks do appear to crush the ship, and the depicted rock formations and Watkins Glen, referred to by Dickinson in discussing the picture's man-made structures, both pertain to his native region of western New York state, as does the trapped weasel, based on one he had found in a glen in Sheldrake. And neither these, nor the falling rocks are connected with the supposed topic of his painting (described in a letter of 1934 as the "stranding of Dr. Kane's brig 'Advance' on the Greenland coast"). Rather, the ruined state of the walkways and stairs and the upended terrain, like the trapped weasel and the crushed ship and whaleboat reinforce the idea of a situation without escape that leaves him feeling trapped and crushed, with the ground collapsing and rocks falling from above.

Biographical events may also have contributed to Dickinson's feelings: he had a bout with ulcers in 1933; he experienced back pains bad enough to wear a back brace from June 1931 until after Stranded Brig was complete; and on July 1, 1934 he entered the hospital for a battery of tests. The tests were inconclusive, but Dickinson's daughter believes the real problem was depression, a family problem that had led to the death of his older brother, Burgess, in 1913 and was perhaps exacerbated by his still-unresolved struggle with Woodland Scene, on which he had at that time spent five and a half years. When Dickinson's brother Burgess jumped to his death, his eldest brother Howard told the press that Burgess often became depressed when he felt that his work hadn't achieved the level of excellence he set for himself, and Dickinson, who called his brother "the chief influence in my entire life", may well have felt the same way. Indeed, his reported comments about Stranded Brig, probably in the fall or winter of 1932, before it was reworked for the PWAP, indicate the pressure he felt to do justice not only to this picture but to the unfinished Woodland Scene, which was becoming more difficult to finish than he had expected. According to Provincetown painter Bruce McKain, Dickinson had shown him the picture of boats in ice, told him that it was not finished and he wouldn't finish it without doing "justice to the way it should be. [He said,] 'I wouldn't any more finish it that way than I'd throw myself out of this window.'"
