= Oregon Department of Administrative Services =

State agency

Agency overview
- Jurisdiction: Oregon
- Headquarters: Salem, Oregon
- Minister responsible: Tina Kotek, Governor of Oregon
- Agency executive: Betsy Imholt, director
- Website: Official website

The Department of Administrative Services is the agency of the government of the U.S. state of Oregon which is chiefly responsible, through its nine divisions, for administering all of the programs of the Governor and the executive branch, as well as providing administrative and support services to other state agencies, the legislature, and in some cases, individual citizens of the state. In addition, it is responsible for oversight of all executive branch agencies. 4500 employees. While it cannot set policy, it provides research and strategic planning services to the state's constitutional officers, and on request, to the legislature, which are the basis for policy decisions.

The agency is headed by a Director, appointed by the Governor and serving at her pleasure, subject to confirmation by the Oregon State Senate.

== Divisions, offices and boards ==
- Budget and Management
- Director's Office
- Enterprise Information Strategy and Policy Division (EISPD)
- Facilities
- Human Resource Services
- Office of Economic Analysis
- Operations Division
- Oregon Educators Benefit Board (OEBB)
- Oregon Progress Board
- Public Employees' Benefit Board (PEBB)
- State Controller
- State Data Center
- State Services Division
