= History of the Portland Police Bureau =

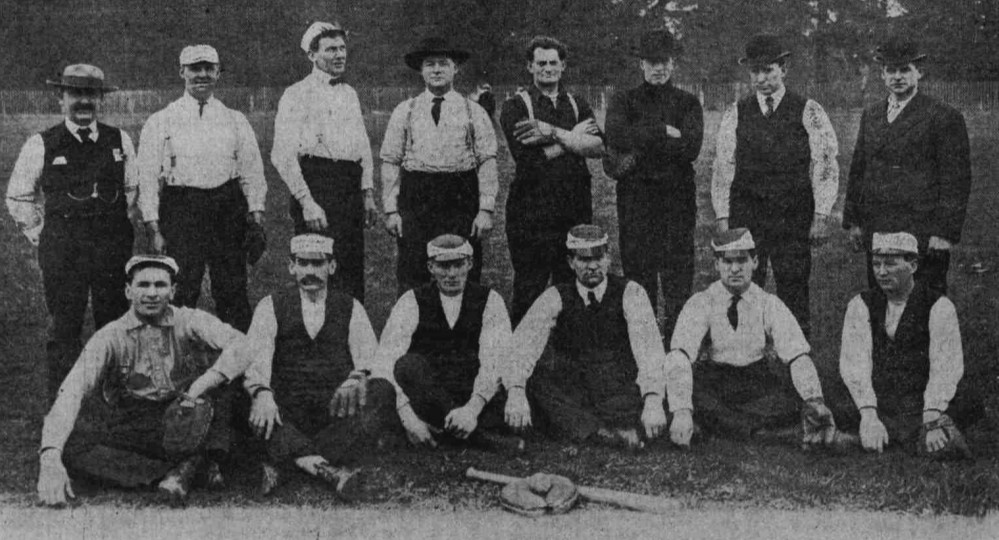
Members of the Portland Police Bureau baseball team in 1907

This is an overview of the history of the Portland Police Bureau.

== 19th century ==
From 1851 to 1870, Portland was policed by a marshal, sometimes elected and sometimes appointed, who usually served a two-year term. After 1861, the marshal was empowered to hire deputies, but they did not have permanent jobs until late in the 1860s. Thomas O'Connor, a deputy, became the first Portland officer to die while on duty in a shooting on August 21, 1867. The bureau, originally named the Portland Metropolitan Police Force, was established in 1870 by the Portland City Council. The Council appointed James Lappeus as its first chief of police, in charge of a force with six patrolmen and one lieutenant, at a time when the population of Portland was less than 9,000. The first member of the Metropolitan Police Force to die in the line of duty was Officer Charles F. Schoppe, who was shot to death on June 13, 1874, while trying to disarm a drunken saloon patron.

== 20th century ==
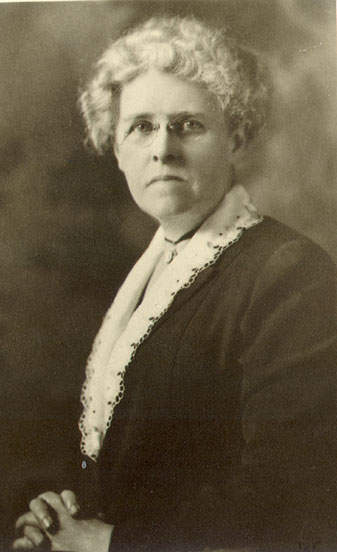
Lola Baldwin in 1915

On April 1, 1908, the bureau became the first in the U.S. to hire a female police officer, Lola Baldwin, who became the Superintendent of its newly established Women's Protective Division, especially noted for helping women during a time that PPB's officers focused on enforcement and patrol of people who could pay them under the table. Unattached women had arrived en masse for the 1905 Lewis and Clark Centennial Exposition.

In 1915, the "Metropolitan Police Force" changed its name to the Bureau of Police. Four years later, the bureau became the first in the U.S. to use a police radio. Sybil Plumlee, also considered to be a pioneer in the field, served in the Women's Protective Division from 1947 to 1967.

PPB's "Red Squad" was formed in the 1910s to fight a rise of communism, the labor movement, and other left-wing efforts. Its membership was documented to overlap with Oregon's branch of Ku Klux Klan in the 1920s and the pro-Nazi antisemitic Silver Shirts in the 1930s; Red Squad Captain Walter Odale was part of American Defenders, a spinoff of the Silver Shirts. In one of Red Squad's "Weekly Report of Communist Activities", Odale stated Portland was the third-largest center of Nazi activity in the country. The Squad interrogated a student leader at Lincoln High School, and within days of this becoming public in 1937, the Red Squad was disbanded. Still, by 1940, the Silver Shirts were confident that police would side with their organization "if any trouble starts in Portland". By 1923 it was estimated over half of the PPB were also members of the Klan.

In 1964, Black Albina resident Cleotis Rhodes was shot during a traffic stop, which led to his death. The use-of-force guidelines were amended by the new police chief to note firearms should only be used related to felonies.

The Mayor and the Chief of Police have indicated that in their opinions the Kerner Report is not applicable to Portland. Satisfactory police-citizen relations are not likely to be achieved as a reality in Portland in the absence of a fundamental change in the philosophy of the officials who formulate policy for the police bureau.

— Report on Problems of Racial Justice in Portland, discussing PPB's relationship with Black Portland residents

In a 1968 City Club of Portland Report on Law Enforcement, PPB were described as having "the right to stop and frisk someone because his skin is black and he is in the black part of town." Albina, the majority-Black area of Portland, was deliberately neglected, as police and Mayor Terry Schrunk confirmed. This was intensified by the ghettoization (through redlining and other means), concentrating Portland's Black population in Albina. Portland police were disproportionately white (1% were Black) even compared to the low percentage of Blacks in Portland (7%). Attitudes were reflected in a 1966 survey, where 86% of officers thought the civil rights movement was happening "moving too fast".

Youth in the Albina neighborhood felt "watched all the time", calling the police "plantation overseers". These frustrations caused a peaceful rally to turn into an unprompted riot at Irving Park in 1967. After this, the Intelligence Unit collected information on any vocal activists and their friends, then harassed individuals "until they found a charge that would stick".

A 1969 class action lawsuit on behalf of 20,000 Black Portlanders led to the 1971 settlement called the Probasco Decree. It required the police to stop using "insulting, degrading or ethnically derogatory terms" towards citizens, banned the use of SAP gloves and leaded batons, and required a search warrant to enter a home. The Internal Affairs Division was created, though it was substantially ineffective, tossing out 90% of complaints in the first year, and nearly 93% of complaints in 1979. Police behavior did not change; in 1974, a resident wrote Mayor Neil Goldschmidt stating "It seems as if any time a police gets the urge to punch something, they snatch the first available black man they see, and use him to satisfy their savage egos." Four Black men were killed by the police in a six-month period of 1974–1975.

In March 1981, PPB officers (Craig Ward, Jim Galloway) dropped dead possums in front of Burger Barn, a Black soul food restaurant owned by George Powe on MLK. Witnesses said there were seven officers and four patrol cars involved. Ward and Galloway said they did it to relieve stress, not out of racial motivation. After pressure from the Black United Front and protests, Ward and Galloway were fired, though no other officers were punished. Stan Peters and the PPA protested the firings, organizing a "Cops Have Rights Too" rally, and demanding Charles Jordan, Portland's first Black city councilor and police commissioner. PPA hired Ward and Galloway to work for the union in the meantime; months later, the firing of the two was overturned in binding arbitration, which found Jordan failed to follow procedures. Marches and rallies were held, and Rev. C. T. Vivian came to the city to organize anti-Klan efforts, believing the possums represented a "Klan mentality" in the department and the ruling would lead to further attacks.

In 1985, Penny Harrington became Portland's first female chief of police, and the first to head a major U.S. police department. Also in 1985, PPB killed a Black veteran, Lloyd Stevenson, by placing him in a chokehold. Stevenson had served in Vietnam for the Marine Corps, and was buried with military honors at Willamette National Cemetery. After scrutiny over Officer Gary Barbour's chokehold, on the day of his funeral, officers sold "don't choke 'em, smoke 'em" t-shirts from a police precinct (Kelly Penumbra building, 47th and E Burnside) and the Portland Police Association's bar, the Portland Police Athletic Association. Two officers, Richard Montee and Paul Wickersham, were fired by Mayor Bud Clark, but later reinstated. A month after the killing, when a grand jury decided to not prosecute the officers, PPA president Stan Peters said people should not "dwell on the past", stating community relations would improve once those angry with the police moved on. He had previously called Black leaders "opportunists" and "vultures" over the Stevenson killing reaction.

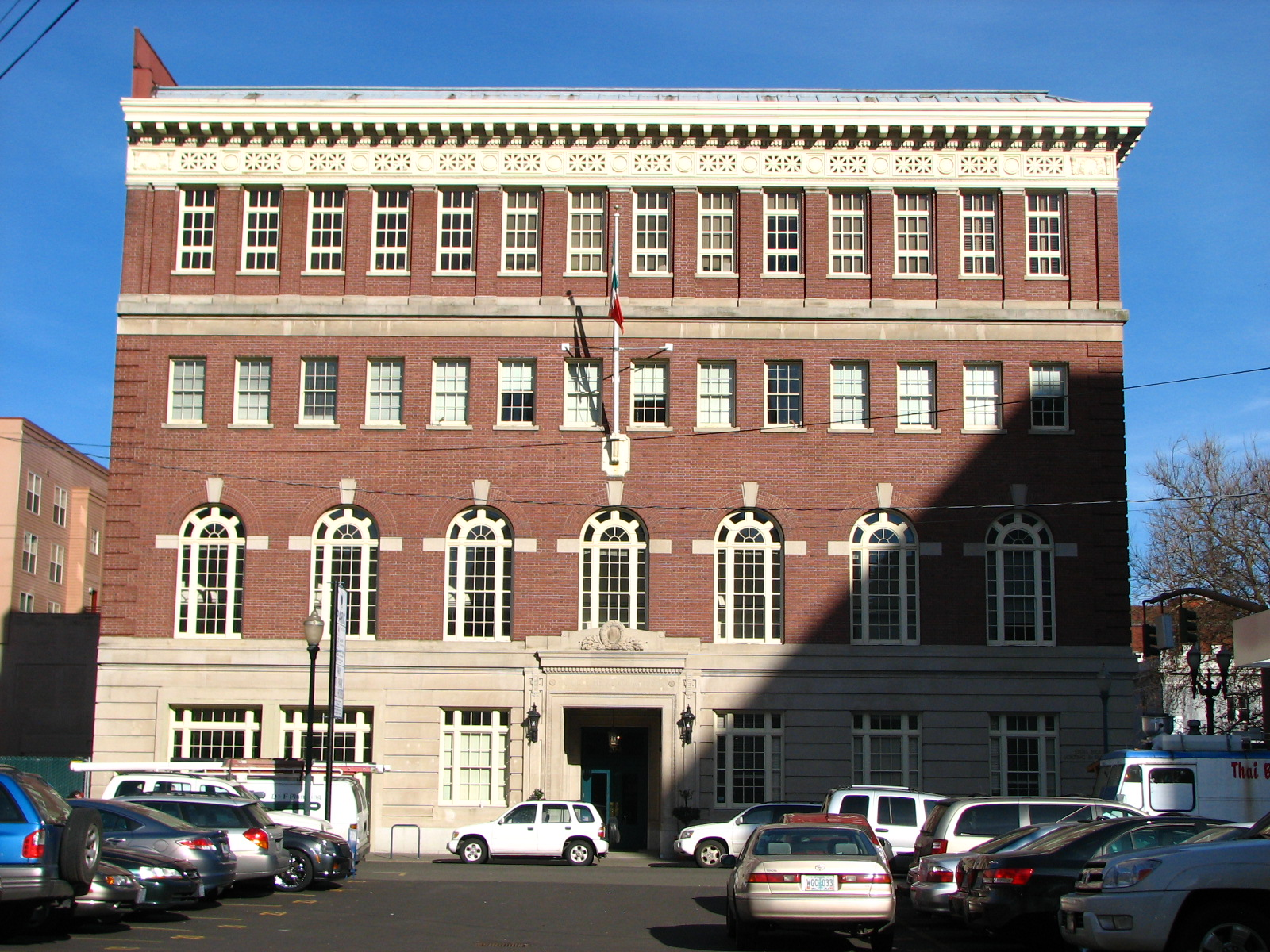
South façade of the Portland Police Block in 2009

The headquarters of the Portland Police Bureau was in the Portland Police Block until 1984. The 1912 building is listed on the National Register of Historic Places.

Since 1992, there have been several cases of suspects having died while in custody at the Multnomah County Detention Center.

=== Prohibition ===
Oregon passed Prohibition laws in 1915. These were enacted in 1916, well ahead of the 18th Amendment. Mayor H. Russell Albee, embroiled in several unrelated controversies, ordered chief John Clark to visibly enforce the prohibition laws. Clark created a "morals squad" in 1916 with Lt. Leo A. Harms as its leader. The raids and arrests focused on the consumers and low-level suppliers, making little impact. Even when an individual appeared in front of a jury trial, the jury would decline to find the person guilty. In at least two cases the jury drank the evidence (liquor) then acquitted the accused for lack of evidence.

The Golden West raid... set the pattern for prohibition enforcement in Portland: with the priority being enforcement of the dry laws against minorities and immigrants.

— Murder and Scandal in Prohibition Portland

Portland's liquor from Prohibition through the 1950s was supplied through a loose ring of Pullman porters. A 1917 raid on Portland's Golden West Hotel, the a hotspot for Portland's Black population and the porters, was a very public event even if no charges were successful.

George Luis Baker became mayor in June 1917; he and PPB chief Leon Jenkins took control of liquor distribution (through bootlegging) and kept speakeasies open. Confiscated liquor was stored in PPB's Central Precinct basement. Several officers on the morals and motorcycle squads were involved in the smuggling. The motorcycle squad operated under Captain Frank Ervin, handling chief Jenkins' "dirty work" such as anti-union work and alcohol distribution. Jim Purcell, later chief detective and police chief, was clearly linked with mobster Jim Elkins and described later as "He was very good at derailing investigations and covering up murders. Jim Elkins... paid Purcell well for his services." A wild Oregon Auto Dealers convention at the Multnomah Hotel led to a raid in 1918, yet no arrests for drinking were made.

=== Intelligence files ===
In the 1950s through the 1980s, PPB's Intelligence Division, the effective successor to the Red Squad, kept files on hundreds of Portland organizations, ranging from the American Civil Liberties Union (ACLU), Black United Front, Bicycle Repair Collective, and the People's Food Co-op. The Intelligence Division had approximately six officers who would gather intelligence and news clippings on organizations and individuals related to them. The paperwork was against city policy, and in 1981 it became against state law (181.575). Some reports were filed even after 1981. Most of the reports focused on left-leaning organizations. Winfield Falk took the records home sometime between 1981 and 1985, then moved them to a barn in eastern Washington. Falk died in 1987, and Portland Tribune's Phil Stanford chased leads until he found and acquired the files in 2002 or prior. Stanford "was devastated" because they were of no use to him, so he gave them to the Tribune.

Winfield Falk was a member of the right-wing John Birch Society, which had been involved with intelligence gathering in a similar unit of the Los Angeles Police Department in 1983. Individuals tracked in the files included Bev Stein, Ron Herndon, Neil Goldschmidt, Vera Katz, Harl H. Haas Jr., and Elizabeth Furse.

When Harrington became chief in 1985, Falk shared intelligence files on city commissioners Mike Lindberg and Margaret Strachan. She said "I just blew up at [Falk]" and broke up the intelligence and vice divisions. She resigned as chief in June 1986.

The files were analyzed by Portland Tribune in 2002 and given to the City of Portland Archives (PARC) in 2004. During an ethnographic study using document theory, researcher Kathy Carbone created an object biography on the files as a whole, noting the concept of "imagined-but-unavailable records" led many to experience strong emotions. Further, the files became recontextualized over time.

== 21st century ==
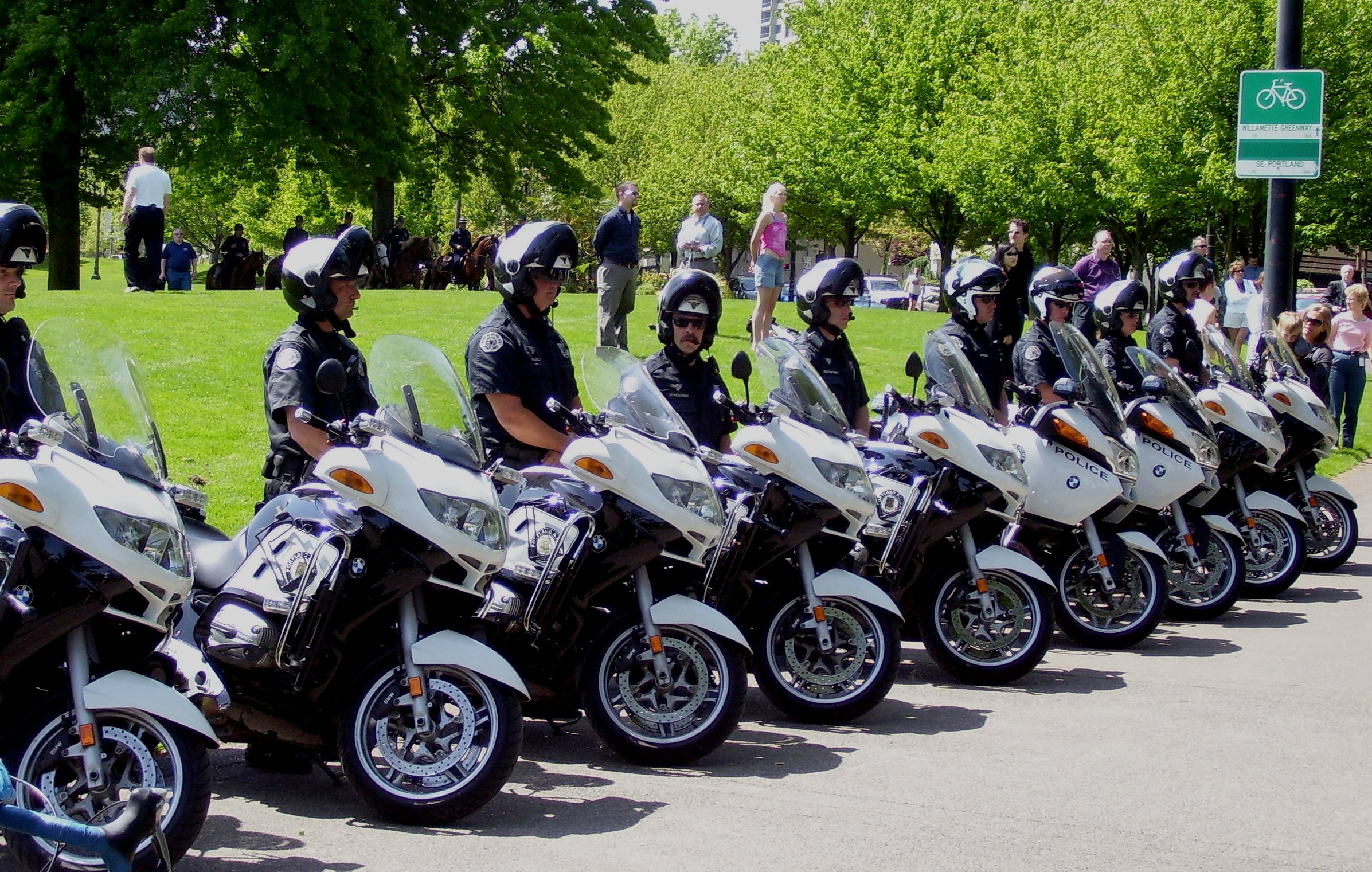
Officers in 2007

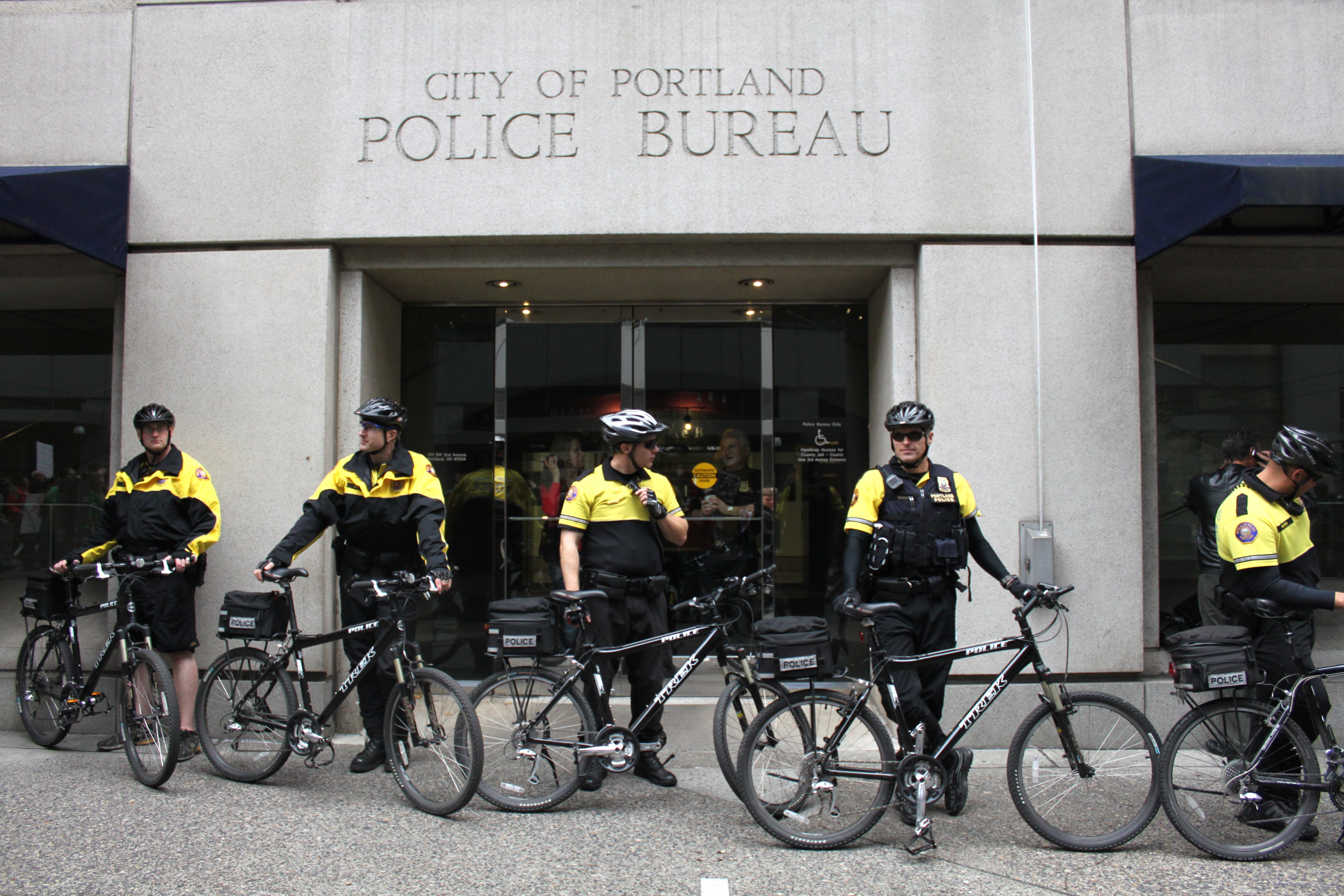
Officers in 2011, during Occupy Portland demonstrations

In 2000, a large protest occurred on May Day. Following that, police chief Mark Kroeker issued a policy to not use less-lethal force to disperse crowds. He also formed the Rapid Response Team designed for crowd control.

During protests against a Bush visit in August 2002, police escalated the force used to disperse protesters, indiscriminately using batons, rubber bullets, and pepper spray. Children (including a 10-month-old baby), independent police observers and a TV cameraperson (Beth English, KPTV) were deliberately sprayed from as little as one foot away from their face. This was counter to the RRT training and the Kroeker policy. The assistant chief, Greg Clark, put responsibility of the children being pepper sprayed on the parents; complaints were filed with the Bureau but they said no inappropriate behavior had occurred. Mayor Vera Katz, however, began to make changes on how crowd dispersal is handled.

Protesters and police both escalated tactics in 2002–2003; in March 2003, a splinter group of black bloc rushed motorcycle police on the Steel Bridge. Police responded, pepperspraying the bloc and innocent bystanders.

In 2011, three Portland police officers beat and tazed a citizen during a traffic stop. While denied by the officers, the episode was caught on a nearby security camera, showing him being repeatedly punched in the head and tazed four times in 30 seconds. A medic report stated "police on scene very reluctant to give any info how patient was injured". In 2014 his civil suit by jury trial concluded, with the jury awarding him $562,000. Greg Kafoury, a lawyer for the citizen, stated "The Portland police are a law unto themselves. These officers will not be disciplined. ...In the past 50 years, no Portland police officer has ever lost their job for physically abusing a citizen." The officers were cleared through an internal investigation.

=== Mark Kruger ===
Sgt. Mark Kruger was revealed to have pepper sprayed Beth English, the KPTV cameraperson, in the 2002 protest. After documented aggression against English and another woman the following year, friends began to speak out against him, stating he had been collecting Nazi memorabilia in the early 1980s and that they would drive through the city, yelling racist and homophobic statements at people. The PPB defended Kruger. PPB spokesperson Brian Schmautz said "If he's a Nazi, then I'm Saddam Hussein". The city attorney's office tried to quash the Nazi details in a lawsuit, stating it violated Kruger's free-speech and privacy rights.

In 2000, Kruger placed a shrine to Nazi soldiers on public park property at Rocky Butte. When Kruger's past was discovered during the 2003 lawsuits, Kruger removed the shrine. The shrine was stored in the city attorney's office by then-deputy Tracy Reeve, preventing their discovery during the lawsuits. Kruger remained on the force and was promoted to captain in 2009. Kruger admitted to wearing Nazi uniforms, explaining that he was a history buff, but denied ever engaging in racist activities or holding Nazi beliefs. In 2010, the shrine's existence was discovered in an internal affairs investigation ordered by commissioner Dan Saltzman. Kruger was disciplined and suspended for two weeks, but was not demoted or fired. Kruger continued to state that he was a history buff, not a Nazi. He remained on the force until his retirement.

In a May 2013 investigation of Kruger, assistant police chief Eric Hendricks discouraged Kruger from appearing before the Performance Review Board to defend himself in a retaliation case. Hendricks was also in charge of internal affairs and police professional standards. A review found that Hendricks had not violated any rule, but that his actions were contrary to the process; Hendricks announced his retirement when the review was opened.

In July 2013, Kruger received a "We Are Portland" award from the Portland Office of Equity and Human Rights (EHR). The director of EHR asked Kruger to not attend the public ceremony and to instead receive the award later; the director apologized for this, recognizing Kruger's "current work and dedication to our city's immigrant and refugee community". The EHR said they were unaware of investigations into Kruger.

I am writing to affirm that I consider you to be a competent and valuable member of the Portland Police Bureau. Your skills and talents as a Critical Incident Commander and ability to connect with the community are outstanding.

— Settlement letter from police chief Mike Reese to Mark Kruger

Kruger sued the city in 2013. The resulting 2014 settlement expunged his past disciplinary records and provided him a complimentary letter from police chief Mike Reese. Charlie Hales, (then the mayor and police commissioner), claimed to be unaware of terms of the settlement, despite signing it. Amid outrage, Hales apologized when the details were made public. Commissioner Novick called it outrageous and "an insult to anyone of Jewish or Russian or Polish descent."

=== Police killings ===
In several high-profile cases, including the James Chasse, Jr. and Kendra James incidents, the Portland Police Bureau has been accused of engaging in the abuse of force and then covering up the investigation. The accusations have prompted a Copwatch program in Portland. In neither the Chasse nor the James interactions were the Portland Police Bureau, nor any sworn officer, found guilty of criminal wrongdoing.

In January 2010, PPB shot and killed Aaron Campbell, a black man, in what Jesse Jackson called an execution. Campbell was suicidal and was known to own a gun. During a welfare check, Campbell had been responding to officer commands and was facing away from them with his hands on his head. When officers felt he was not responding to their commands, an officer (Lewton) shot him with a beanbag round; Campbell then lowered his hands and began to run away. Lewton then shot him with five more beanbag rounds and a K-9 unit released their German Shepherd. Officer Ronald Frashour then shot Campbell in the back with his AR-15, as Frashour believed he was reaching for a gun and would be behind cover. After several internal reviews, Police Chief Michael Reese terminated Frashour in November 2010, indicating he had acted in poor judgement, that Campbell was instinctively responding to pain from the beanbag, was only displaying passive resistance, and had not put officers or the community in immediate threat. Based on that Reese believed the use of force was not reasonably necessary, that Frashour's rigid thought process saw all of Campbell's reactions in the worst light, and that Frashour evaluated the situation as a sniper. Lewton and two other officers received an 80-hour (two week) suspension. A grand jury was convened by the Multnomah County District Attorney (a standard practice); the grand jury declined to indict any of the officers.

Campbell's family settled a wrongful death lawsuit with the city for $1.2 million in February 2012. The Portland Police Association fought Frashour's termination, and he was ultimately reinstated after an arbitrator overturned the city's termination in March 2012. Frashour also received his lost wages. PPA president Daryl Turner said the firing had been politically motivated, and said 25 officers had stated the deadly force was reasonable during Frashour's arbitration. William Lewinski, an expert witness and police shooting advocate, also defended Frashour, stating Campbell could have grabbed his gun, turned around, and fired at an officer faster than Frashour could have reacted with his AR-15 at the ready. This action-reaction theory was called the "Superman theory" by Portland Copwatch's Dan Handelman. Mayor Sam Adams was disappointed by the reinstatement.

In 2011, the Department of Justice began an investigation into civil rights violations at the PPB. This resulted in the United States v. City of Portland settlement regarding their use of force.

On the incident review side, we were disappointed when two of seven commanders failed to write a substantive analysis of fatal shootings, discouraged when a Training Division Review did not engage in any analysis or identify any issue worthy of reflection, and disquieted when we learned that in three cases Training staff stepped out of their lanes and vouched in the grand jury for the appropriateness of involved officers' use of deadly force with only a passing familiarity of the facts. And we worry when we see the application of the “action/reaction principle” as a reflexive justification for the officers' use of deadly force, in a way that recalls how the reference to “furtive movements” was uncritically used in the past to justify officers' actions.

— 2020 independent audit

In a 120-page independent review of police-involved killings in 2020, the auditors noted that despite an improvement in transparency and outreach related to the killings, they noted the lack of a "reservoir of goodwill" from the department and called out the failure of timeliness in the investigations and review process. In two of the seven deaths, there was no analysis, but only a cursory review. The department had concluded that nothing was to be learned from the incidents and that police conduct in them met bureau policy. This was not true.

=== Alt-right, Antifa, and Black Lives Matter ===
In 2014, just before a grand jury ruling on the death of Michael Brown by Officer Darren Wilson in Ferguson, Missouri, at least three officers altered an image of their police badges to state "I AM DARREN WILSON". Chief Mike Reese demanded the officers remove the images, calling them inflammatory, noting it was against policy to imply such a political endorsement using their badges. One of the three officers had previously been noted for using inappropriate force in 2011 against a Spanish-speaking man.

At a Black Lives Matter rally in 2015, an officer tweeted that he was "stuck late again at work to babysit these fools." He was removed from street duty for an internal investigation; the officer had been warned in 2012 after messaging the entire department his "knee-jerk reaction" to the upcoming Department of Justice investigation of PPB.

In June 2017, a Patriot Prayer protest was held a week after the racist slayings in the 2017 Portland train attack. Alt-right demonstrators such as Todd Kelsay and Tusitala "Tiny" Toese assisted Department of Homeland Security officers with detaining and arresting counter-protesters. Additionally, PPB and Oregon State Police kettled almost 400 counter-protesters. The counter-protesters were detained until photographed and showing their identification (which was also photographed); individuals wearing masks were required to remove them. Instructions were communicated over a LRAD. The group included journalists, who were given the same treatment. The police chief, Marshman, initially claimed it was other agencies, not PPB, who took the photos, which was disproven. Marshman also stated PPB would purge the photos if the individual was not part of an investigation, but still had all of the images a year later. The Independent Police Review noted the chilling effects to free speech and the lack of reasonable suspicion of criminal acts by the group; deleted portions of the IPR report described the alt-right as being considered "much more mainstream" by one police lieutenant. ACLU of Oregon described the kettling as a "counterproductive and constitutionally dubious response to protesters", and opened a class action lawsuit against the police in November 2017; the case was still ongoing as of August 2020.

After 2017–2018 confrontations between the alt-right and anti-fascists, Lieutenant Jeff Niiya's close conversations via text with Joey Gibson, head of Patriot Prayer, was published. Niiya helped members avoid arrest. After a six-month investigation, Niiya was not disciplined for this, but the investigation also showed that the police chief and Mayor Ted Wheeler knew about Niiya's communication.

An officer was hired from Burlington, New Jersey's sheriff's department in 2017. The Center for Investigative Reporting's Reveal documented his ties to extremist groups during his time in Burlington, including the anti-government Military Patriot Oath Keepers and the anti-Muslim Voice of the American Infidels. PPB's internal affairs department investigated him for three months and would not share the outcome, but the officer is still employed by PPB. The Oregonian noted that existing social media policies would not punish individuals who were part of private social media groups.

In an ongoing series of protests beginning in May 2020 following the murder of George Floyd, the Portland Police Bureau has clashed with Portlanders demanding justice against police brutality. In what Rolling Stone reporter Tim Dickinson called "with no remorse or sense of irony", the PPB has been widely criticized for their violent tactics to dissolve the protests including tear gas, flash bombs, impact munitions, and use of force without warning. The PPB has also been the target of temporary restraining orders for violating constitutional rights and for attacking journalists. The PPB were supplemented with federal agents deployed by President Donald Trump who have reportedly arrested rioters and antifa off the streets from unmarked police vehicles for detainment without reading Miranda Rights, providing cause, or identifying themselves.

After Mayor Wheeler banned the use of CS gas by PPB on September 10, 2020, the Portland Police Bureau issued a press release, blaming the need for CS gas on the protesters, described as "Victim Blaming 101" by a journalist. PPA's Turner said it would "blow up in the Mayor's face". Days later, Wheeler emailed the police chief and staff, admonishing them for the apparent insubordination in the press release, and later called it "serious breach of protocol and an inappropriate use of City communications resources".

=== COVID-19 pandemic ===
During the COVID-19 pandemic, the PPB's union fought against attempts to implement a requirement for COVID-19 vaccination for PPB staff. The union said the vaccine requirement would lead to mass resignations, as PPB officers were "so deeply" opposed that they would resign rather than get the vaccine. The attempts were successful as the Oregon Legislative Assembly passed a law exempting law enforcement officers from vaccine mandates.
