= Killing of Robert Delgado =

Man in mental health crisis killed by Portland Oregon police in 2021

Robert Douglas Delgado
- Born: December 13, 1974
- Died: April 16, 2021 (aged 46); Portland, Oregon, U.S.
- Cause of death: Deadly Force
- Other name: Bobby Delgado
- Children: 3

Robert Douglas Delgado (December 13, 1974 – April 16, 2021) was an American man living in Portland, Oregon, when he was shot and killed by Portland Police Bureau officer Zachary DeLong after spending a night in Lents Park.

== Incident ==
Officers were called to the park after a 911 caller reported that a man in the park was drawing a gun and pointing it at children in the park. Police arrived at the park and targeted Delgado who was holding what appeared to be a firearm. According to recordings of police radio, and eyewitness video, officers hid behind a tree 60 feet (18 m) from Delgado and called out to him. When Delgado refused to comply, fearing an immediate threat to the public, Officer DeLong shot and killed him. Police recovered a replica handgun with and a magazine to the gun from Delgado.

Delgado was the 29th man killed by Portland police officers since the opening of a "pattern and practice" investigation by the United States Department of Justice in 2011. Most killed were in some sort of mental health crisis. No police officer was held criminally responsible by the Multnomah County District Attorney for the deaths they caused and none faced discipline from the chiefs of the Portland Police Bureau, the mayors or city councilors, the state licensing board, or the state attorney general. Since its launch in 2001, Portland's Independent Police Review Board has not investigated a case of lethal use of force.

Police released a photo of the replica firearm, and the audio recording of the incident.

== Investigation ==
On April 23, 2021, Delgado's family asked Oregon Governor Kate Brown, Oregon Attorney General Ellen Rosenblum, and Multnomah County District Attorney Mike Schmidt to appoint a special prosecutor to the criminal investigation of Officer DeLong. That request was joined by community organizations including the Oregon Justice Resource Center, the Mental Health Association of Portland, and the ACLU of Oregon. Other organizations, such as the Mental Health Alliance were outraged by the killing. On the afternoon of April 23, the Delgado family was joined by over 200 community members for a peaceful memorial gathering at Lents Park.

Also on April 23, the police bureau denied a media request for an un-redacted version of the 18 minute 911 audio. Schmidt affirmed the PPB denial saying that, as of May 25, releasing the audio was premature.

On April 27, Portland Police chief Chuck Lovell said the Bureau would cooperate with any review of the deadly shooting, including a special prosecutor appointed by the state's attorney general.

On April 28, Rosenblum and Schmidt announced there would be a joint investigation into the death of Delgado.

== Grand jury ==
On September 24, 2021, a Multnomah County grand jury announced it did not find enough evidence to charge DeLong with any crime in relation to shooting Delgado. The officer testified he saw Delgado holding a pistol, which turned out to be a replica with an orange tip.

Delgado's daughter was quoted, "There is no part of us that is really surprised. This wasn't a thorough investigation. It can never be when people are investigating their own people. There's just not questions being asked."

Transcripts from three days of the Delgado / DeLong grand jury were released November 13, 2021. Witnesses described Delgado acting erratically and becoming more agitated and incoherent after police arrived. In the transcript, members of Robert Delgado's family said they intend to commission their own investigation of the shooting and called Portland's mental health system dysfunctional.

== Civil Suit ==
On April 11, 2023 attorneys from the Oregon Justice Resource Center filed a civil suit on behalf of Delgado's family against the City of Portland, DeLong, and five other unnamed city employees.

== See also ==
- George Floyd protests in Portland, Oregon
- List of killings by law enforcement officers in the United States
