= Multnomah County Jail =

Multnomah County Jail may refer to:

- Multnomah County Justice Center, home of one of the two jails operated by Multnomah County, Oregon and headquarters of the Portland Police Bureau.
- Multnomah County Inverness Jail, another jail operated by Multnomah County.
