= Danielle Outlaw =

Former police commissioner in Philadelphia, Pennsylvania, U.S.

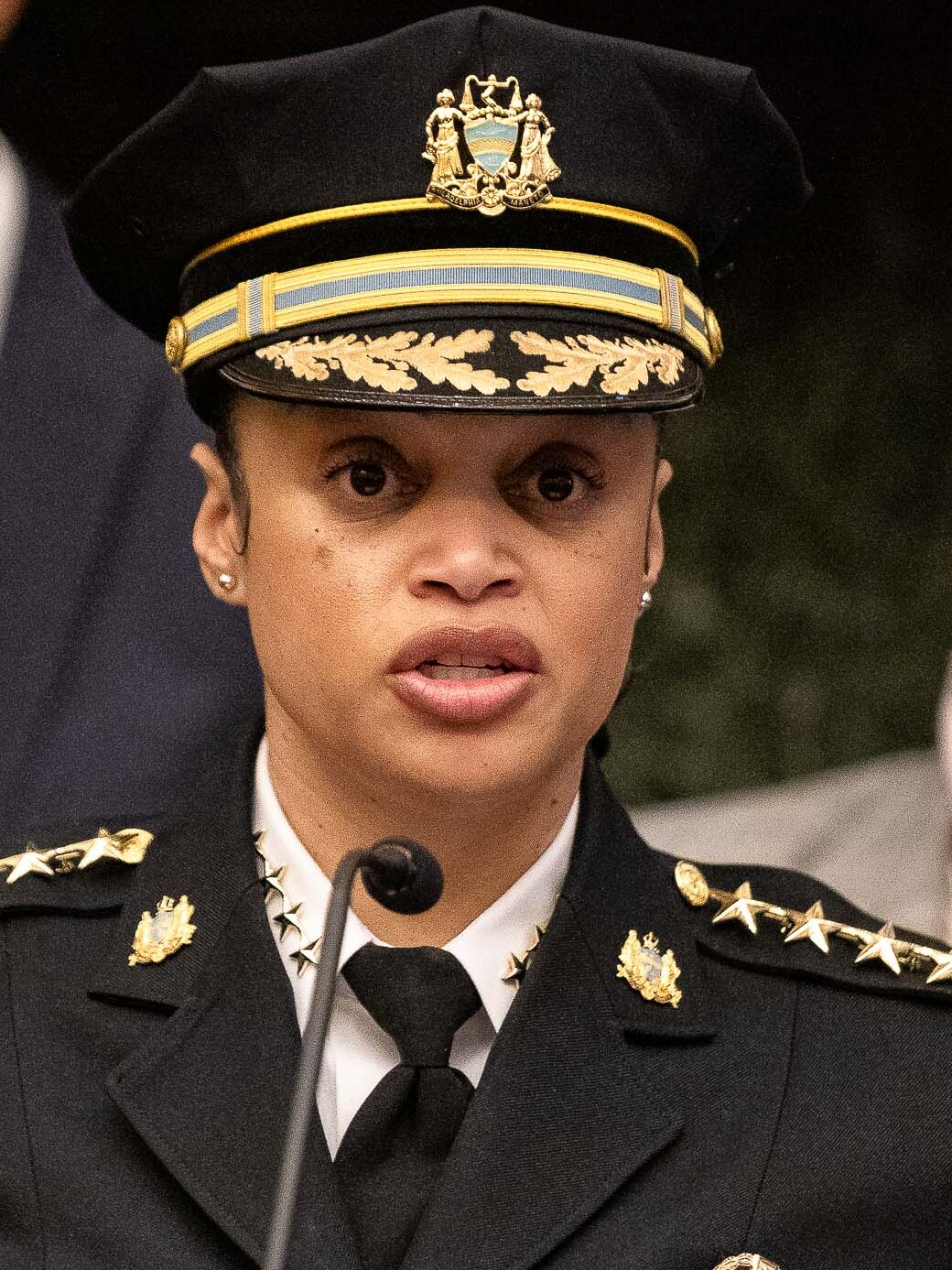

Commissioner of the Philadelphia Police Department
- In office February 10, 2020 – September 22, 2023
- Mayor: Jim Kenney
- Preceded by: Richard Ross Jr.
- Succeeded by: John M. Stanford Jr.

Chief of the Portland Police Bureau
- In office October 2, 2017 – December 31, 2019
- Preceded by: Michael Marshman
- Succeeded by: Jami Resch

Deputy Chief of the Oakland Police Department
- In office 2013–2017

Personal details
- Born: Danielle Bowman; September 1976 (age 50) Oakland, California, U.S.
- Education: University of San Francisco (BA); Pepperdine University (MBA)

Danielle Outlaw (née Bowman; born September 1976) is an American former law enforcement officer. She served as commissioner of the Philadelphia Police Department in Philadelphia from 2020 to 2023, chief of police of the Portland Police Bureau in Oregon from 2017 to 2019, and deputy chief of the Oakland Police Department in California from 2013 to 2017.

== Early life and education ==
Outlaw's father and mother worked with the California Department of Transportation and AT&T. She attended the Holy Names High School in Oakland, California. She did not have a good perception of the Oakland police during her childhood. In high school, Outlaw visited the Oakland Police Department as part of a career exploration program, where she had the opportunity to patrol with officers. This caused her to change her perception of the police, and find out that many of those in the police force were just like her.

Outlaw graduated from the University of San Francisco with a Bachelor of Arts in sociology, followed by a Master of Business Administration from Pepperdine University. She entered the Pepperdine Grazio Business School to differentiate herself from people in her field. In addition, Chief Outlaw was the recipient of the Oakland Black Officers' Association Trailblazer Award, the Holy Names High School Alumnae Association Citation for Service and the 2015 Police Executive Research Forum, which also known as PERF, Gary P. Hayes Award.

While a student at the University of San Francisco, Outlaw participated in the 1996 Wheel of Fortune College Championship. Outlaw won one game (including the bonus round), and advanced to the finals, ultimately falling short of the championship. However, Outlaw still won more than $40,000 in cash and prizes.

== Career ==
Outlaw began her law enforcement career with the Oakland Police Department in California, where she worked for 20 years, achieving the post of deputy chief as the department experienced a number of scandals. She rose through the ranks to Deputy Chief after various assignments, including Patrol, Community Services, the Office of Chief of Police, the Criminal Investigation Division, Internal Affairs, and the Office of Inspector General. During her time in Oakland, Outlaw thought the police should change their communication styles. She suggested that women's so-called "soft skills" could help in communicating with other communities, and avoid potentially dangerous situations.

=== Portland Police Bureau ===
In 2017, when Mayor Ted Wheeler announced Outlaw would be replacing interim chief Mike Marshman, Outlaw said that she has been trying to change the perception of policing nationwide. Outlaw began serving as chief of police for the Portland Police Bureau in 2017.

One of the biggest changes for Outlaw that has come with her new position was the move from Oakland to Portland. Outlaw is one of five Portland chiefs hired from outside of the PPB in the last twenty years. Before moving to Portland Outlaw had a long history in the city of Oakland. Not only was she born and raised in Oakland, but she also joined the Alpha Kappa Alpha sorority two years before her move to Portland. The sisterhood, which was created to join African-American women together, helped her build a community in Oakland. One significant ally that Outlaw has found is a fellow Oakland native Damian Lillard. Lillard was quick to extend a welcome to the new chief by inviting her to parties and showing support for Outlaw via social media posts.

When Outlaw was hired as chief of police for the Portland Police Bureau, she became the first African American woman to hold this position. Before her, there had been two other female chiefs in Portland: Penny Harrington and Rosie Sizer.

When Outlaw joined the Portland force in 2017, the city's Office of Equity released data stating that a quarter of PPB officers were women, and a quarter of officers identified as people of color. In the short time that she has been in Portland, she has stated that she hopes to improve this statistic and make a difference within the bureau. Outlaw said that she had a "...hope to support both demographic diversity and 'diversity of thought' in the bureau."

Outlaw has also been part of communities such as the San Francisco Bay Area National Organization of Black Law Enforcement Executives (NOBLE) and International Association of Chiefs of Police (IACP) Human and Civil Rights Committee. Both of these organizations aim to implement diversity in the police force. These groups heavily influenced Outlaw's principles of policing and lead her direction for the Portland Police Bureau.

Prior to her resignation, Outlaw faced scrutiny for her perceived bias against antifascist activists in Portland. During an interview with conservative talk radio host Lars Larson, Outlaw compared antifascist counter-demonstrators at an August 4, 2018, rally to children who "whine and complain" about losing a schoolyard fight. Outlaw served as Portland's Police chief for a little more than two years before moving on to Philadelphia.

=== Philadelphia Police Department ===
On December 30, 2019, the City of Philadelphia and Mayor Jim Kenney announced the appointment of Outlaw as the new Commissioner of the Philadelphia Police Department, beginning February 10. Portland Mayor Ted Wheeler accepted Outlaw's resignation the same day, and she was succeeded by her deputy, Jami Resch.

On September 5, 2023, Outlaw announced she would be resigning as commissioner of the Philadelphia Police Department to take a new job as the deputy chief security officer of the Port Authority of New York and New Jersey. She was replaced by interim commissioner John M. Stanford Jr. on September 22, 2023.

== Personal life ==
Outlaw is a member of The Links.

== See also ==
- List of Pepperdine University people
