= United States v. City of Portland =

Lawsuit

United States of America v. City of Portland
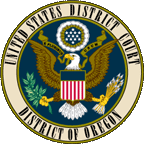
- No. 3:12-cv-02265-SI
- Court: United States District Court for the District of Oregon
- Full case name: United States of America v. City of Portland
- Defendant: City of Portland

Court membership
- Judge sitting: Michael H. Simon

Keywords
- Use-of-force, civil rights, police brutality, mental illness, Portland, Oregon

United States v. City of Portland was a lawsuit filed by the United States Department of Justice against the City of Portland, Oregon on December 17, 2012, alleging a pattern or practice of unconstitutional use of force by the Portland Police Bureau against individuals with actual or perceived mental illness.

The lawsuit was filed a lawsuit in the U.S. District Court for the District of Oregon under the Violent Crime Control and Law Enforcement Act of 1994, 42 U.S.C. § 14141 against the City of Portland.

== Background ==
The U.S. Attorney's Office for the District of Oregon and the Civil Rights Division of the U.S. Department of Justice, based their findings on more than a year of investigation, and sought injunctive and declaratory relief.

Specifically, the DOJ claimed: (1) Portland police encounters with such individuals too frequently resulted in a higher level force than necessary; (2) Portland police employed Tasers more times than necessary on such individuals, or in circumstances where such force was not justified; and (3) Portland police used a higher degree of force than justified for low level offenses.

United States v. City of Portland is notable because of its finding persons with mental illness are primary recipients of police use-of-force.

In February 2010 after the killing of Aaron Campbell by Portland police officer Ron Frashour, at the request of an alliance of Black church leaders, Portland city councilor and police commissioner Dan Saltzman asked Senator Ron Wyden for assistance in bringing a Federal civil rights investigation of the Portland Police Bureau. Representative Earl Blumenauer joined Wyden in a letter to the DOJ asking for an investigation.

In a widely publicized press conference June 8, 2011, Assistant U.S. Attorney General Thomas E. Perez announced the launch of an investigation to determine whether the Portland Police Bureau engaged in a pattern or practice of excessive or unnecessary use-of-force in their interactions with persons in a protected class, people with actual or perceived mental health disabilities, and whether such conduct deprived individuals of their rights secured by the Fourth and Fourteenth Amendments of the U.S. Constitution.

The 18-month-long investigation was prompted by the high number of Portland police officer-involved deaths that involved individuals with mental illness, including Kendra James, James Jahar Perez, James Chasse, Raymond Gwerder, Keaton Otis, Jack Dale Collins, Aaron Campbell, Darryel Ferguson, Thomas Higginbotham, and Brad Morgan.

On September 13, 2012, DOJ issued a Findings Letter with the results of the investigation, stating investigators found reasonable cause to believe Portland police had engaged in unconstitutional conduct. The letter identified serious deficiencies in policy, training, and officer accountability measures that substantially contributed to the unconstitutional conduct by police. That same day, DOJ and the City of Portland released a joint statement declaring the parties' mutual intent to reach a negotiated settlement agreement to resolve these issues.

On October 13, 2012, in a joint press conference, the DOJ and the City of Portland announced a settlement had been reached. On November 15, 2012, Portland City Council unanimously approved the settlement agreement. On November 27, 2012, Portland City Council approved a new tax on service providers of telephone land-lines to pay for police reforms. On December 17, 2012 — the same date the complaint was filed —the parties filed a joint motion to enter a settlement agreement and conditionally dismiss the action, subject to the Court retaining jurisdiction to enforce the agreement.

The proposed settlement agreement includes detailed provisions addressing Portland Police Bureau policies and practices regarding: (1) use of force; (2) dealing with persons perceived as or actually suffering from mental illness or mental health crises; (3) dealing with persons suffering from addictions and mental health challenges; (4) crisis intervention; (5) identifying at-risk employees; (6) officer accountability; (7) training; (8) supervision; (9) misconduct complaint intake, investigation, and adjudication; (10) transparency and oversight; and (11) community engagement. The proposed settlement agreement also includes provisions regarding the implementation and enforcement of its terms.

On December 18, 2012, the Portland Police Association, the labor union representing officers of the Portland Police Bureau, filed a motion to intervene. On January 8, 2013, the Albina Ministerial Alliance Coalition for Justice and Police Reform also moved to intervene.

Both interveners asked to participate in any negotiations of the proposed settlement agreement. On February 19, 2013, the Judge Michael H. Simon fully granted the Portland Police Association's motion, and granted the Albina Ministerial Alliance Coalition for Justice and Police Reform "enhanced amicus status for remedy purposes." Ultimately, both parties were allowed to participate in the settlement negotiations. In 2018 The Mental Health Alliance was joined as an amicus intervenor.

== Attorneys ==
The United States has been represented by Brian Buehler, Adrian L. Brown, Laura Coon, Laura Cowall, Jonas Geissler, Renata Gowie, Jared Hager, Janice Hebert, Michelle Jones, Amanda Marshall (resigned), Robert Moosey, Thomas Morse, Thomas Perez (promoted to Secretary of Labor), Stephen Rosenbaum, Jonathan M. Smith, Seth Wayne, Thomas Wheeler, and Billy Williams. Marshall resigned her position in April 2015 and was replaced by Williams. Williams resigned his position in February 2021 and was replaced by Scott Erik Asphaug. The City of Portland has been represented by Mark Amberg, David Landrum, Ellen Osoinach, Judy Prosper, Tracy Reeve, James Van Dyke, Denis Vannier, Heidi Brown, Robert Taylor, and Bridget Donegan. Intervener Portland Police Association is represented by Anil Karia. Intervener Albina Ministerial Alliance Coalition for Justice and Police Reform has been represented by Ashlee Albies, Shauna Curphey, and Kristen Chambers. Intervenor Mental Health Alliance is represented by Juan Chavez and Franz Bruggemeier.

== Documents ==
- Letter from US Senator Ron Wyden & US Congressman Earl Blumenauer to U.S. DOJ, February 2010
- Letter to US Senator Ron Wyden from Portland Police Commissioner Dan Saltzman, February 2010
- U.S. DOJ v. City of Portland - Findings, September 2012
- U.S. DOJ v. City of Portland - Settlement Agreement, October 2012
- City of Portland contract with Rosenbaum & Watson, LLP, around December 31, 2014
- First Quarterly Report by the Compliance Officer and Community Liaison, May 14, 2015
- Letter to Judge Michael Simon from all parties to U.S. v. City of Portland, July 10, 2015
- Periodic Compliance Status Assessment Report for the Settlement Agreement in United States v. City of Portland, September 2015
- Semi-Annual Outcome Assessment Report, October 2015
- Semi-Annual Outcome Assessment Report, April 2016
- Semi-Annual Outcome Assessment Report, May 2017
- DOJ Compliance Status Assessment Report, October 2016
- Compliance Status Assessment Report, July 2017
- City of Portland memo for second "status conference,' October 2016
- DOJ's post status conference status report, November 2016
- City of Portland's post status conference memorandum, November 2016
- Letter from Portland City Council to Judge Simon condemning his allowance of public testimony, November 2016
- City of Portland 'supplemental' memo for second "status conference,' December 2016
- City of Portland Petition for Writ of Mandamus, Stay of Proceedings, Reassignment on Remand with the US Ninth Circuit Court of Appeals, December 2016
- Response from Judge Simon to appeal, cancels upcoming status conference, December 2016
- Status Report from USA DOJ, City of Portland, and the Portland Police Association, July 2017
- Status Report from the Albina Ministerial Alliance Coalition for Justice & Police Reform, July 2017
- Response to amended settlement agreement from Albina Ministerial Alliance Coalition for Justice & Police Reform, October 2017
- U.S. v. City of Portland - Amended Settlement Agreement, December 2017
- DOJ Compliance Status Assessment Report, December 2017
- Status Conference - transcript, April 2018
- Compliance and Outcome Assessment Report: Mental Health Response, July 2018
- Status Conference - transcript, October 2018
- Compliance and Outcome Assessment Report: Training & Employee Information System, November 2018
- Status Conference - transcript, February 2020
- Compliance and Outcome Assessment Report- Quarter 1 2020 Updates & Analysis, June 2020
- Compliance and Outcome Assessment Report- Quarter 2 2020 Updates & Analysis, August 2020
- Special Event After Action Report, written by PPB Sergeant Martin Schell - November 20, 2020
- Compliance and Outcome Assessment Report- Quarter 3 2020 Updates & Analysis, November 2020
- Plaintiff’s Notice of Fifth Periodic Compliance Assessment Report February 11, 2021
- Compliance and Outcome Assessment Report- Quarter 4 2020 Updates & Analysis, March 2021
- 2020 Protest After Action Report and Recommendations, written by PPB Commander Craig Dobson - undated.
- 2020 Protest Challenge and Solution Analysis, written by PPB Assistant Chief Jamie Reisch - undated.
- US DOJ to PPB Letter - Requested Police Review Board Written Critique, March 23, 2021
- US DOJ to PPB Letter - Notice of Noncompliance letter April 2, 2021
- US DOJ to PPB Letter - Requested 2020 Protest Master After Action Report May 5, 2021
- City of Portland to US DOJ response to notice of noncompliance with settlement of US v City of Portland May 7, 2021

== Outcome ==
The settlement agreement includes 187 items. One item is the defendant (The City of Portland) must hire a compliance officer-community liaison (COCL) and form a Community Oversight Advisory Board (COAB). After soliciting only three eligible applicants for the $315,000 per year position, on November 8, 2014, Portland City Council selected a team of academics led by Dennis Rosenbaum of the University of Illinois at Chicago. During community meetings Rosenbaum's team received the lowest rating, but boosted their viability to Mayor Charlie Hales by agreeing to hire former Oregon state Supreme Court Chief Justice Paul De Muniz. De Muniz resigned April 8 citing poor health.

All parties reached a tentative agreement regarding the terms of the proposed settlement in December 2013. Subsequently, the court held a fairness hearing for the general public for February 18–19, 2014. Parties filed their post-hearing memoranda on July 2. Judge Michael Simon approved the agreement August 29, stating the city must give him annual updates on reforms for up to five years. City Council, led by Mayor Charlie Hales and Commissioner Amanda Fritz, with support from the police union, appealed Simon's decision on October 22, 2014. After months of talks between city and federal officials, they reached an agreement that the sessions won't be called "evidentiary hearings" but instead "status conferences," and the appeal was withdrawn in August 2015.

In September 2015 the DOJ released its first Compliance Status Assessment Report for the Settlement Agreement in United States v. City of Portland. The report found the bureau was in "partial compliance" but also listed significant outstanding problems which were not addressed, including failure to track data on use of force, failure to write reports on shootings, and investigating officers sharing information - such as video recordings of shootings - with officers under investigation.

The DOJ's October 2016 Report cited progress on most items of the Agreement but excoriated Portland Mayor Charlie Hales and Police Chief Larry O'Dea for not informing investigators that O'Dea shot a friend while drinking alcohol and playing with firearms. Community oversight of the Agreement was stymied by hostility and poor facilitation by the Rosenbaum team causing the DOJ to allow city attorney Tracy Reeve to adjourn COAB meetings for 60 days on August 19.

Mayor Ted Wheeler disbanded the COAB on February 1, 2017 and after months of meetings with the DOJ, proffered an amended plan, stripped of independent community assessment of the implementation of the settlement agreement.

In August 2017 Portland City Council agreed to amend the Settlement Agreement to create a new community oversight group, the Portland Committee on Community-Engaged Policing, bypass the Police Review Board when an officer accepts discipline for less-serious offenses, remove a 180-day deadline for an appeal ruling on alleged police misconduct before the Citizen Review Committee, ensure officers who use deadly force are interviewed within 48 hours, change to how use of force data is measured and collected, and allow the COCL to report on one or two comprehensive elements of the settlement instead of addressing every single element. No changes directly benefited people with mental illness harmed by police. In December 2017, Portland dropped a legal challenge to court-ordered hearings. On April 19, 2018, Judge Simon gave a six-month conditional agreement to the amendments. The City failed to start a new community oversight group before the October 4 status conference and Simon extended the 'conditional' approval until June 2019. In a June 2019 status conference the city failed to show the oversight group had yet accomplished anything beyond being formed. In a February 2020 status conference, again the city failed to show the amendments to the agreement were fair, reasonable, and adequate. Amicus testified on the Portland Committee on Community-Engaged Policing, highlighting its attrition of members, lack of broad community outreach and respect for recommendations offered by members with mental illness, and Judge Simon gave the city another year to resolve issues. In September 2020 the COCL found the city out of compliance with data collection and training issues. In January 2021 citing the city's non-compliance, Judge Simon delayed further hearings until August 2021. In April 2021 the US DOJ, echoing the COCL's September report, found the city out of compliance with the agreement and gave the city time to respond with a written plan.

In an independent analysis of Portland police data presented in Federal court in April 2022, Jonathan Betz Brown, PhD of the Mental Health Alliance showed no decrease in use of force by police, against people with mental illness or not, between 2017 and 2022.

== Timeline ==
- September 17, 2006 - James Chasse, a man with schizophrenia, is beaten to death by police officers. A Grand jury brought no indictment against Chasse officers.
- January 30, 2009 - Chief of Police Rosie Sizer tells media the Chasse investigation 'is going through the process, and I do not think it will take too much longer.'
- August 2009 - Three years after the death of James Chasse, mental health advocates call for release of investigation. Chief Sizer is fired by Mayor Sam Adams May 2010.
- November 27, 2009 - Portland Police Association supporters march on City Hall; Mayor Sam Adams and Police Commissioner Dan Saltzman drop plans to discipline Officer Christopher Humphreys for killing James Chasse.
- January 29, 2010 - Aaron Campbell, a man in a mental health crisis, is shot in the back during routine welfare check by Portland Police Bureau officer Ronald Frashour. On February 11, the grand jury brings no indictment to Campbell officer. On February 17, Jesse Jackson calls for a Department of Justice investigation of the death of Aaron Campbell.
- March 22, 2010 - Jack Dale Collins, a person with a diagnosis of mental illness, is shot and killed by a Portland police officer.
- May 12, 2010 - Keaton Otis, a person with a diagnosis of a mental illness, is shot and killed by Portland Police officers during a routine traffic stop after shooting Officer Christopher Burley twice. On May 28, a grand jury brings no indictment to Otis officers.
- May 12, 2010 - Portland Mayor Sam Adams fires Police Chief Rosie Sizer.
- December 17, 2010 - Darryel Ferguson, a person with a diagnosis of mental illness, is shot and killed by two Portland police officers. On December 30, a grand jury brings no indictment to Ferguson officers.
- January 2, 2011 - Thomas Higginbotham, a person with a diagnosis of mental illness, is shot and killed by two Portland police officers. On January 28, a grand jury brings no indictment to Higginbotham officers.
- June 8, 2011 - Assistant U.S. Attorney General Thomas E. Perez announced a federal investigation into whether the Portland police engage in a "pattern or practice" of civil rights violations, particularly against people with mental illness, relating to officers' use of force, and charged the Civil Rights Divisions Special Litigation section to conduct the review with the U.S. attorney's office.
- June 30, 2011 - William Monroe, a person with a diagnosis of mental illness, is shot from behind by Portland Police officer Dane Reister. Reister claimed he intended to shoot Monroe with an orange less-lethal "bean-bag" rifle. On November 11, 2011, Reister was the first Portland police officer indicted for use-of-force since the early 1960s. The city settled out of court with Monroe for $2.3 million in April 2012. Reister plead not guilty on June 30, 2012, and was fired from the force on October 16, 2013. Reister killed himself in May 2015.
- January 25, 2012 - Bradley Morgan, a person with a diagnosis of mental illness, is shot and killed by Portland Police officer David Scott, and Sgt. John Holbrook. They were drawn to Morgan's position high atop a downtown parking structure because of his call to a suicide hotline. Officers claimed Morgan pointed a gun, later found to be a toy, at them. On February 15, 2012, a grand jury finds no cause to indict the officers. In January 2014, Morgan's family filed a Federal suit against the city for $3 million.
- July 28, 2012 - Billy Wayne Simms, a person with a diagnosis of mental illness, is shot six times and killed by Portland Police officer Justin Clary with an AR-15. Clary stated he believed Simms was reaching for a gun, and a 22-caliber handgun was found. Simms had also swallowed a bullet earlier in the day. On August 12, 2012, a grand jury finds no cause to indict Clary.
- September 13, 2012 - Perez announced reported problems with Portland Police Bureau's policies, training and supervision, including a pattern and practice of harming people with mental illness, including excessive use of Tasers. Both parties release a preliminary agreement.
- October 26, 2012 - The parties in U.S. v City of Portland announce a settlement agreement of 187 items to be resolved over five years. Activists denounce the agreement as insufficient and unfair.
- November 14, 2012 - Portland City Council approve the settlement agreement in U.S. v City of Portland.
- November 28, 2012 - Portland City Council extends a tax on land-line phone service providers to cover the costs of police reforms stemming from the settlement of U.S. v City of Portland. Estimated value of the tax is $3–$5 million per year.
- February 17, 2013 - Merle Hatch, a person with a diagnosis of mental illness and a long history of drug addiction, is shot six times and killed by Portland Police Sgt. Nathan Voeller and officers Andrew Hearst and Royce Curtiss after he charged them in a hospital parking lot. Hatch had tried to access the hospital for psychiatric care. He was a Federal fugitive at the time of his death. On March 20, 2013, a grand jury finds no cause to indict the three officers.
- March 4, 2013 - Santiago Cisneros III, a veteran with a diagnosis of mental illness, is shot and killed by Portland Police Officers Michele Boer and Bradley J. Kula after he ambushed them in a parking lot. A grand jury finds no criminal wrongdoing by police.
- November 6, 2013 - Parties and amici agree on final settlement of U.S. v City of Portland. Parties and amici agree to not oppose the settlement.
- February 18, 2014 - Judge Michael Simon holds a two-day "fairness hearing" inviting community members to answer if the settlement is fair, reasonable and adequate. Most say it is not.
- March 12, 2014 - Kelly Swoboda, a fugitive with a diagnosis of mental illness and drug addiction, is shot and killed by Portland Police Officer John Romero. Swoboda had a long criminal history and was wanted for kidnapping. On April 7, 2014, a grand jury found no cause to indict Romero, who was wounded.
- June 12, 2014 - Nick Davis, a person with a diagnosis of schizophrenia, is shot and killed by Portland Police officer Robert Brown. Davis was 23 and homeless. Brown claimed Davis attacked him with a crowbar. On July 12, 2014, a grand jury found no cause to indict Brown.
- August 29, 2014 - Judge Simon accepts the settlement of U.S. v City of Portland but requires annual progress reports starting September 2015.
- September 14, 2014 - The final three COCL candidates, led by Daniel Ward, John Campbell and Dennis Rosenbaum, make a public presentation.
- October 17, 2014 - City Council led by Mayor Charlie Hales vote to appeal Judge Simon's requirement of annual progress reports.
- November 7, 2014 - Mayor Hales and City Council select the Dennis Rosenbaum Group, the weakest and least-favored candidate, to be the monitor of U.S. v City of Portland. Their contract is for $315,000 per year for an anticipated five years.
- November 19, 2014 - Portland police plan hire six additional data analysts, and the mayor's office plans to hire a mental health specialist and a recreational marijuana specialist to prepare information and develop community relationships for the Rosenbaum COCL group.
- March 17, 2015 - Court monitor Paul De Muniz is criticized by community members for locating the Rosenbaum COCL group's office inside a police precinct. Additionally De Muniz relies on the defendant City to administer its web site and social media accounts, and provide support staff.
- March 23, 2015 - Christopher Healy, a person with schizophrenia, is shot and killed by Portland police officer Thomas Clark. On April 24, a Multnomah County grand jury finds Clark is justified in killing Healy.
- April 8, 2015 - Citing poor health, Paul DeMuniz quits as Portland representative of the Chicago-based Rosenbaum & Watson COCL group. Noted LGBTQ activist Kathleen Saadat is announced as his replacement on May 28.
- May 17, 2015 - Michael Harrison, a man in a mental health crisis, is shot, wounded and arrested by Portland police officer Raelynn McKay. On June 11, a Multnomah County grand jury found McKay was justified in shooting Harrison. McKay is not indicted.
- June 29, 2015 - Allen Bellew, a man with a long history of drug addiction, is shot and killed by Portland police officers Dominic Lovato and Michael Currier. On July 21, a Multnomah County grand jury finds Lovato and Currier justified in killing Bellew. The officers are not indicted.
- July 5, 2015 - David James Ellis, a man with a history of mental illness, is shot by Portland police officer Scott Konczal after a confrontation where Ellis cut Konczal's partner's hand with a folding knife. Officers said Ellis was attempting to burglarize a police office. Konczel is not indicted.
- July 10, 2015 - Both parties to U.S. v. City of Portland reach a mediated settlement to the appeal by City, agreeing to relax a requirement City provide evidence in annual hearings before a Federal judge.
- August 19, 2015 - City attorney Ellen Osoinach testifies to City Council the contract of Rosenbaum & Watson LCC should be increased from $315,000 to $458,000 per year. A week later the City agrees.
- November 6, 2015 - Michael Johnson, a man with bipolar disorder, is shot and killed by Portland police officers Russell Corno and Chad Daul. Officers knew Johnson was in a mental health crisis and said Johnson shot a pistol twice into the ground and then pointed the gun, perhaps at them, before they opened fire. Officers are not indicted.
- June 2016 - After ordering public testifiers arrested for disorderly conduct, COAB Board Chair Kathleen Saadat resigns from her position with the Rosenbaum & Watson COCL group. Amy Watson pens an editorial published in The Oregonian blaming people with mental illness for disruptions and the committee's inaction. Several members of the COAB resign and city commissioners fail to appoint new members.
- August 23, 2016 - Both parties to U.S. v. City of Portland suspend all COCL and COAB functions for 60 days.
- October 25, 2016 - Second Annual Status Conference with Judge Michael Simon was marked by public testimony, an arrest in the courtroom of a member of the public waiting to testify, and a complaint by Portland attorneys against Judge Simon for allowing public testimony. That complaint is dropped in December 2017.
- December 2016 - Mayor Charlie Hales appeals case to Ninth Circuit Court to block Judge Simon from requiring the city to report on re-establishing the COAB.
- December 9, 2016 - Portland police officer Lawrence Keller shot and killed Steven Liffel, a man in a mental health crisis. Keller was not indicted.
- January 28, 2017 - Mayor Ted Wheeler resigned all members of the Community Oversight Advisory Board (COAB), saying he didn't believe the board "was particularly effective in achieving its objectives."
- February 7, 2017 - Portland police officer Andrew Hearst shot and killed 17 year old Quanice Hayes, a teenager in a mental health crisis. Hearst was not indicted.
- May 10, 2017 - Portland police officer Samson Ajir shot and killed 24-year-old Terrell Johnson, a man in a mental health crisis. Ajir was not indicted.
- July 2017 - Ted Wheeler announces a new oversight group, Portland Commission on Community-Engaged Policing (PCCEP) will be formed.
- October 25, 2017 - Portland police officer Ryan Reagan shot and seriously injured Chase Peeples, a man in a mental health crisis later arrested for bank robbery. Peeples was unarmed.
- December 26, 2017 - DOJ reports Portland police officers and supervisors routinely violate both policy and the settlement agreement on Taser use.
- March 8, 2018 - Portland police officers Darrel Shaw and Joseph Webber shot and injured burglary suspect Sarah Michelle Brown. Brown was armed and shot at officers, who were uninjured. The officers were not indicted.
- April 8, 2018 - Portland police officers Richard Bailey, Justin Damerville, Kameron Fender, Alexandru Martiniuc, Bradley Nutting, Chad Phifer, Andrew Polas, and Multnomah County Sheriff's Deputy Aaron Sieczkowski shot and killed 48-year-old John Elifritz in a homeless shelter. A former white supremacist, Elifritz had attempted to carjack a vehicle at knifepoint and successfully carjacked a second vehicle before entering a homeless shelter brandishing a knife. He was a man in an addiction and mental health crisis. The officers were not indicted.
- September 8, 2018 - Judge Micheal Simon accepts the petition for a new amicus to the case, the Mental Health Alliance, representing people with mental illness.

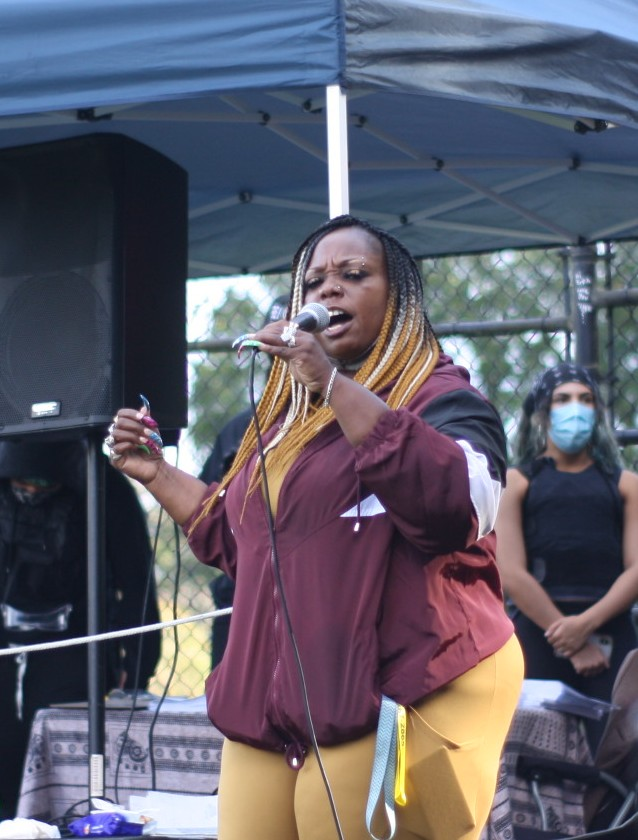
Letha Winston, mother of Patrick Kimmons, speaks at Irving Park in Northeast Portland during the George Floyd protests of 2020

- September 30, 2018 - Portland Police officers Sergeant Garry Britt and Jeffrey Livingston shot and killed 27-year-old Patrick Kimmons. The officers were not indicted.
- October 10, 2018 - Samuel Rice, age 30, was shot and killed by Portland Police Bureau sniper Kelly VanBlokland. Rice had barricaded himself into a motel room with his girlfriend. Police had tried several times in the past weeks to engage with Rice and get him to mental health treatment.
- October 19, 2018 - Portland police officer Kameron Fender and Clackamas County Sheriff's Deputy Jon Campbell, shot and wounded Jason Hansen after a car chase which began in Clackamas and ended in Portland. Police failed to identify the man shot for 10 days or interview Fender within 48 hours. The officers were not indicted.
- November 22. 2018 - Richard Barry, age 52, was in an agitated state and asking for assistance when he was stopped by six Portland Police officers who handcuffed him. Security & body cam footage shows officers held Barry face down on the sidewalk until he died of a heart attack. Medical examination found Barry had alcohol, cocaine and methamphetamine in his system. The officers were not indicted.
- December 8, 2018 - Ryan Beisley, age 34, was shot and wounded by Portland police officer after waving a replica gun in grocery store Starbucks. He had been enrolled in a post-prison alcohol treatment program.
- January 6, 2019 - Andre Gladen, age 36 and legally blind, was shot and killed by Portland Police officer Consider Vosu. Gladen was acutely mentally ill, had just been released from a hospital, and was found by concerned neighbors sleeping in an apartment hallway.
- April 29, 2019 - Jeb Brock was shot and killed by Portland Police Sgt. James Mooney and Officer Michael Gonzalez. Brock had a long history of addiction and mental illness. He was holding a hostage when he was killed. The officers were not indicted.
- June 10, 2019 - David Downs was threatening a hostage with a knife when he was shot and killed by Portland Police officer Nathan Kirby-Glatkowski. According to his mother Downs had a history of addiction.
- July 30, 2019 - Lane Martin was in a mental illness crisis and threatening passersby when Portland Police officer Gary Doran shot and killed him. A grand jury found no criminal wrongdoing.
- November 14, 2019 - Koben Henriksen was in a crisis caused by schizophrenia when he was shot and killed by Portland police officer Justin Raphael. A grand jury found no wrong-doing by the officer.
- February 10, 2021 - After an aggressive response by police to protests about lack of police reform inspired by the murder of George Floyd, the US DOJ requests the city produce a plan to return to compliance with the settlement agreement in four areas - inappropriate use and management of force during protests, inadequate training, subpar police oversight and a failure to adequately share an annual report with the public as required.
- March 24, 2021 - The city declines to produce a plan on how to conform with settlement agreement.
- March 28, 2021 - US DOJ puts city of Portland on formal notice of non-compliance.
- April 16, 2021 - Robert Delgado was in a mental health crisis when he was shot and killed by Portland police officer Zachary DeLong. A grand jury declined to charge the officer.
- June 24, 2021 - Michael Ray Townsend was shot and killed by Portland police officer Curtis Brown. Townsend had a long history of addiction and mental illness, and had called 911 for assistance because he felt suicidal. A grand jury did not charge the officer.
- August 27, 2021 - Alex Tadros was shot and killed by either Portland police officers Joshua Howery or Jake Ramsey. A grand jury found they had acted within the law. Tadros had an extensive history of drug use.
- Andreas Boinay was shot and wounded by PPB officers on September 12, 2021, Joshua Degerness was shot and wounded December 12, 2021, and Matthew Leahey was shot and wounded May 7, 2022.
- November 9, 2021 - After the City agreed to most of the remedies sought by federal lawyers, the judge overseeing the case ordered the parties to return to mediation to try to resolve remaining differences, including a policy to govern the use of the body cameras and whether rank-and-file officers as well as sergeants and higher-ranking officers would be held accountable for improper use of force during protests.
- January 11, 2022 - The city and the federal government reached a tentative agreement on outstanding items. The City agreed to investigate and hold rank-and-file officers accountable for improper use of force during the 2020 protests, as well as higher-ranking, command officers. And the city was given freedom to negotiate a body camera policy with the police union, but Justice Department reserved final approval on the policy.
- January 18, 2022 - The City released a PowerPoint training slide from 2018 showing a “Prayer of the Alt Knight”—a meme image that urges the beating and pepper-spraying of demonstrators in biblical terms and advocates leaving them “cuffed,” “stuffed,” “stitched and bandaged,” so that they might "learn."

== See also ==
- Arresting Power: Resisting Police Violence in Portland, Oregon, is a documentary film which provides a historical and political analysis of the role of police in contemporary society and the history of policing in Portland, Oregon.
