= Richard Ross Jr. =

American law enforcement officer

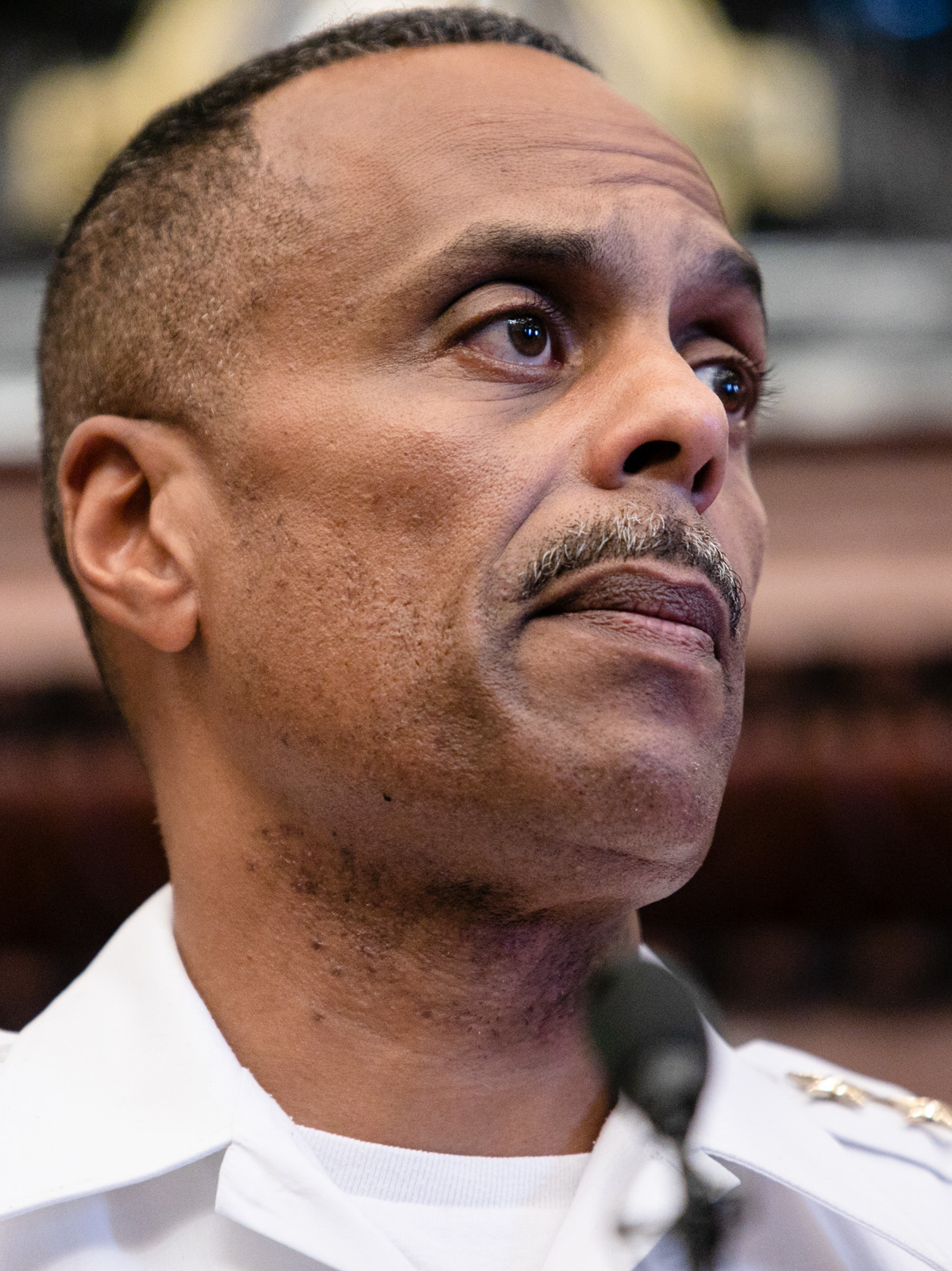

Commissioner of the Philadelphia Police Department
- In office January 5, 2016 – August 20, 2019
- Mayor: Jim Kenney
- Preceded by: Charles H. Ramsey
- Succeeded by: Danielle Outlaw

Personal details
- Born: Philadelphia, Pennsylvania, U.S.
- Education: Pennsylvania State University (BA); Saint Joseph's University (MA)

Richard Ross Jr. is an American law enforcement officer who served as the Commissioner of the Philadelphia Police Department from January 2016 to August 2019 at 51 years of age. Commissioner Ross was born and raised in Philadelphia. Before getting into law enforcement, Ross aspired to be a lawyer. Ross became a Philadelphia Police Officer who climbed to the rank of Commissioner. Following allegations of sexual harassment and racial and gender discrimination within the police department, he announced his resignation on August 20, 2019. In January 2020, Wrap Technologies issued a release stating that they had hired Ross.

Ross graduated from Central High School (Philadelphia) before going on to earn an undergraduate degree in Labor & Industrial Relations from Penn State University, and a Master’s Degree in Criminal Justice from Saint Joseph’s University.

Police appointments
Preceded by Charles H. Ramsey	Commissioner of the Philadelphia Police Department; 2016–2019	Succeeded by Danielle Outlaw
