= Portland Police Block =

Historic building in Portland, Oregon, U.S.

- U.S. National Register of Historic Places
- Portland Historic Landmark
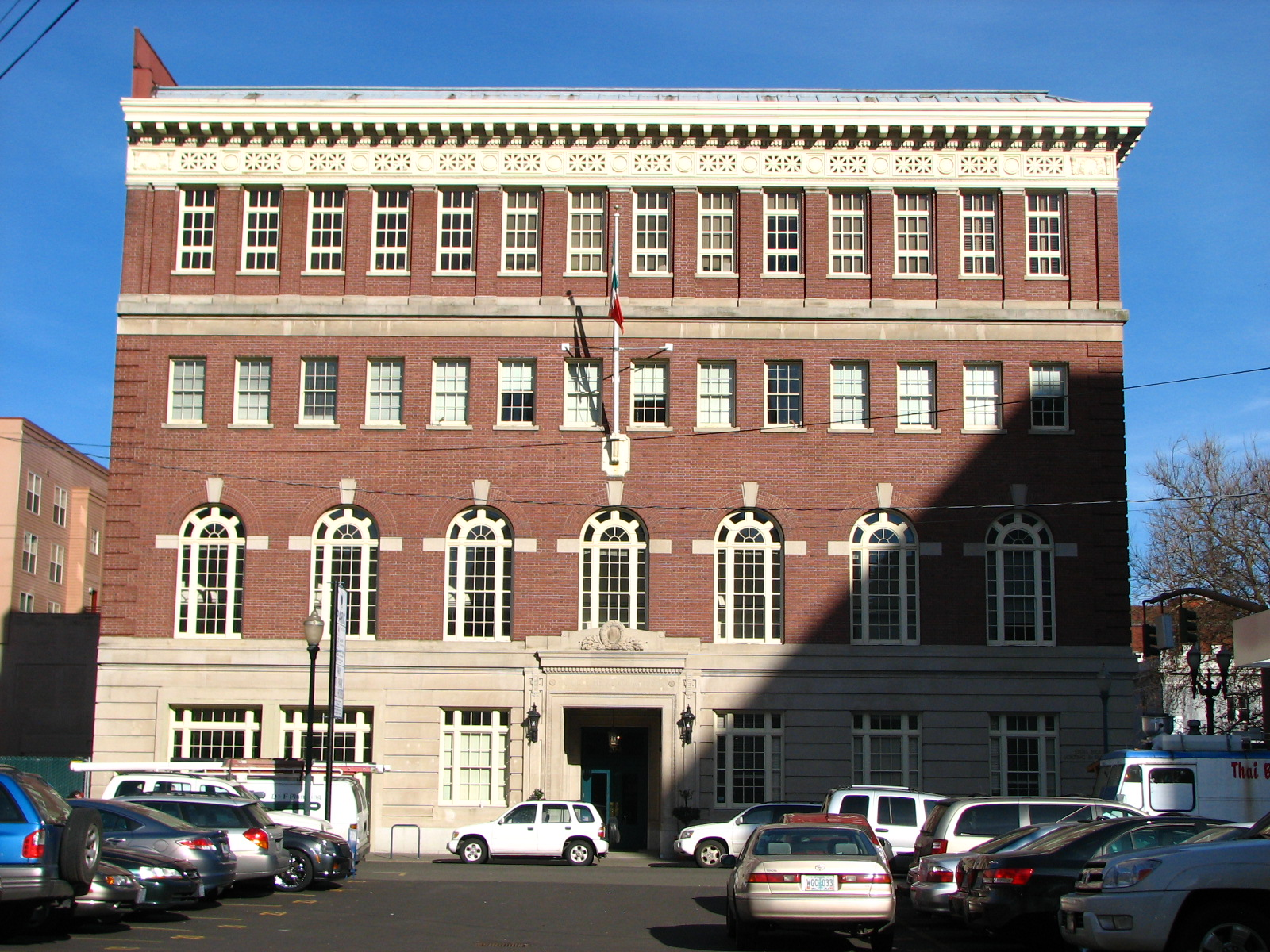
- The building's south façade in 2009

- Location within Portland, Oregon Location within Oregon Location within the United States
- Location: 209 SW Oak Street; Portland, Oregon
- Coordinates: 45°31′15″N 122°40′24″W
- Built: 1912
- Architect: Emil Schacht & Son
- Architectural style: American Renaissance
- NRHP reference No.: 85001185; 100004313 (decrease)

Significant dates
- Added to NRHP: June 6, 1985
- Boundary decrease: April 3, 2020

The Portland Police Block, located in downtown Portland, Oregon, and at the southern edge of the Old Town historic district, is listed on the National Register of Historic Places. The building served as the headquarters of the Portland Police Bureau until 1984.

== See also ==
- National Register of Historic Places listings in South and Southwest Portland, Oregon
