= Jami Resch =

Portland Police Bureau Chief of Police

Chief of the Springfield Police Department
- Incumbent
- Assumed office March 17, 2025
- Mayor: Sean VanGordon
- Preceded by: Andrew Shearer

49th Chief of the Portland Police Bureau
- In office December 31, 2019 – June 8, 2020
- Mayor: Ted Wheeler
- Preceded by: Danielle Outlaw
- Succeeded by: Chuck Lovell

Personal details
- Born: 1973 or 1974 (age 45-46) Montana

Jami L. Resch is an American police officer currently serving as chief of the Springfield, Oregon Police Department. She previously served as chief of the Portland Police Bureau from December 31, 2019, until June 8, 2020.

== Early life and education ==
Resch was born in Montana, and moved to the Beaverton area early in her life. She attended Beaverton High School. She went on to graduate from the University of Portland in 1996 with a bachelor's degree in allied health and a minor in psychology.

== Career ==
Resch, who originally wanted to become a doctor, joined the Portland Police Bureau in 1999 in a recruiting push that hired 80 new officers. Over the next two decades, Resch rose through the ranks; she was promoted to sergeant in 2008, lieutenant in 2012, and captain in October 2016. After her promotion to captain, she served as acting commander of the North Precinct. In May 2018 she was appointed assistant chief of the Investigations Branch. On May 3, 2019, she began to serve as deputy chief.

On December 30, 2019 Portland Mayor Ted Wheeler announced the resignation of Resch's predecessor, Danielle Outlaw; he named Resch as her replacement in the same announcement. Resch was sworn in the following day. Whereas Wheeler hired Outlaw after a lengthy national search with public input, the mayor chose to promote Resch from within the bureau immediately and without public input. She is the 49th person to serve as chief.

On June 8, 2020, Resch stepped down as chief of police, handing over the position to Chuck Lovell after her handling of the George Floyd protests was met with controversy.

In 2023, Resch joined the Springfield Police Department and was sworn in as interim chief of police on March 17, 2025 after Andrew Shearer resigned, citing new opportunities.
