= Bob Day (police officer) =

American police chief

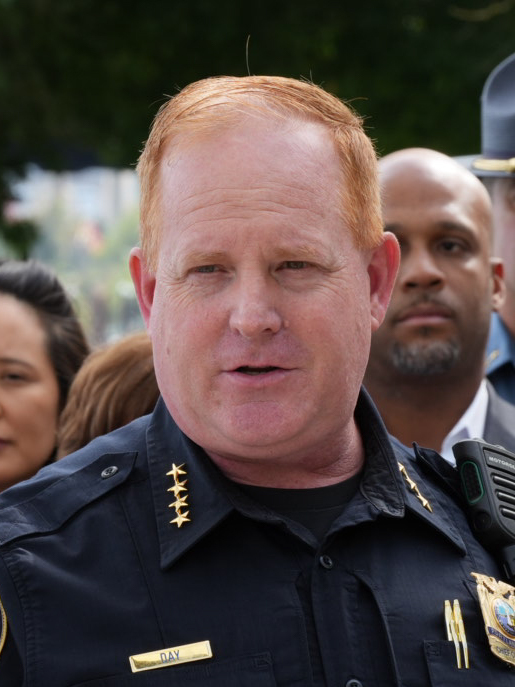
- Day at a press conference in 2025

51st Chief of the Portland Police Bureau
- Incumbent
- Assumed office October 11, 2023
- Mayor: Ted Wheeler; Keith Wilson
- Preceded by: Chuck Lovell

Deputy Chief of the Portland Police Bureau
- In office May 3, 2018 – May, 2019

Personal details
- Born: Robert Day United States
- Education: Clackamas Community College (ADCJ); George Fox University (BA)

Robert Day is an American police officer who currently serves as Chief of the Portland Police Bureau in Portland, Oregon.

== Early life and education ==
Day received his associate degree in Criminal Justice from Clackamas Community College in 1991, and received a bachelor's degree in Organizational Management from George Fox University in 2018.

== Career ==
Day started at the Portland Police Bureau in April 1991. Throughout his career, he has served as Captain of the Training Division and later as Commander of the Central Precinct, which covers Downtown.

In 2018, Day was appointed Deputy Chief, a position he served in for a year before retiring in 2019.

=== Chief of the Portland Police ===
On September 20, 2023, Day came out of retirement and was appointed as Acting Chief of the PPB by Mayor Ted Wheeler after Chuck Lovell demoted himself to an Assistant Chief over Community Engagement. As Chief, Day has been notable for an increase in "broken windows policing" and a crack down on property and vehicle theft. His term has also dealt with a significant increase in public drug use, which was thought to be fueled by Oregon's temporary decriminalization of hard drugs and the rise of fentanyl use.
