= Chuck Lovell =

Former chief of the Portland Police Bureau,

Assistant Chief of Services and Community Engagement for the Portland Police Bureau
- Incumbent
- Assumed office October 11, 2023
- Chief of Police: Bob Day

50th Chief of the Portland Police Bureau
- In office June 8, 2020 – October 11, 2023
- Mayor: Ted Wheeler
- Preceded by: Jami Resch
- Succeeded by: Bob Day

Personal details
- Born: 1973 or 1974 (age 51–52)

Charles "Chuck" Lovell is the former chief of police of the Portland Police Bureau, in Portland, Oregon and currently serves as the Bureau's assistant chief of services. He was named chief on June 8, 2020, amid protests over the murder of George Floyd and police brutality. Lovell is the fourth black head of the Portland Police and the 50th police chief in PPB's history. Lovell served as chief until October 11, 2023, when Bob Day was sworn in as interim chief of police.

== Early life and education ==
Lovell was born in Brooklyn, New York. He joined the United States Air Force at age 19 and served four years on active duty and two in the reserves. He received his Bachelor of Criminal Justice degree from Park University. He is pursuing a master's degree in strategic leadership from the University of Charleston.

== Career ==
Lovell has been on the Portland police force since 2002. He was most recently head of the Community Services Division.

He was a lieutenant when Chief Jami Resch resigned and asked him to replace her in June 2020, following criticism over the department's response to protests following the murder of George Floyd.

On September 20, 2023, Lovell announced that he would step down as chief to pursue more involvement in the bureau's community engagement efforts. Lovell was officially replaced by retired deputy chief Bob Day on October 11, 2023 and Lovell took on the role as assistant chief of the services division.

== Personal life ==
Lovell lives outside Portland, in Washington County.
