= Multnomah County Justice Center =

Building in Portland, Oregon, U.S.

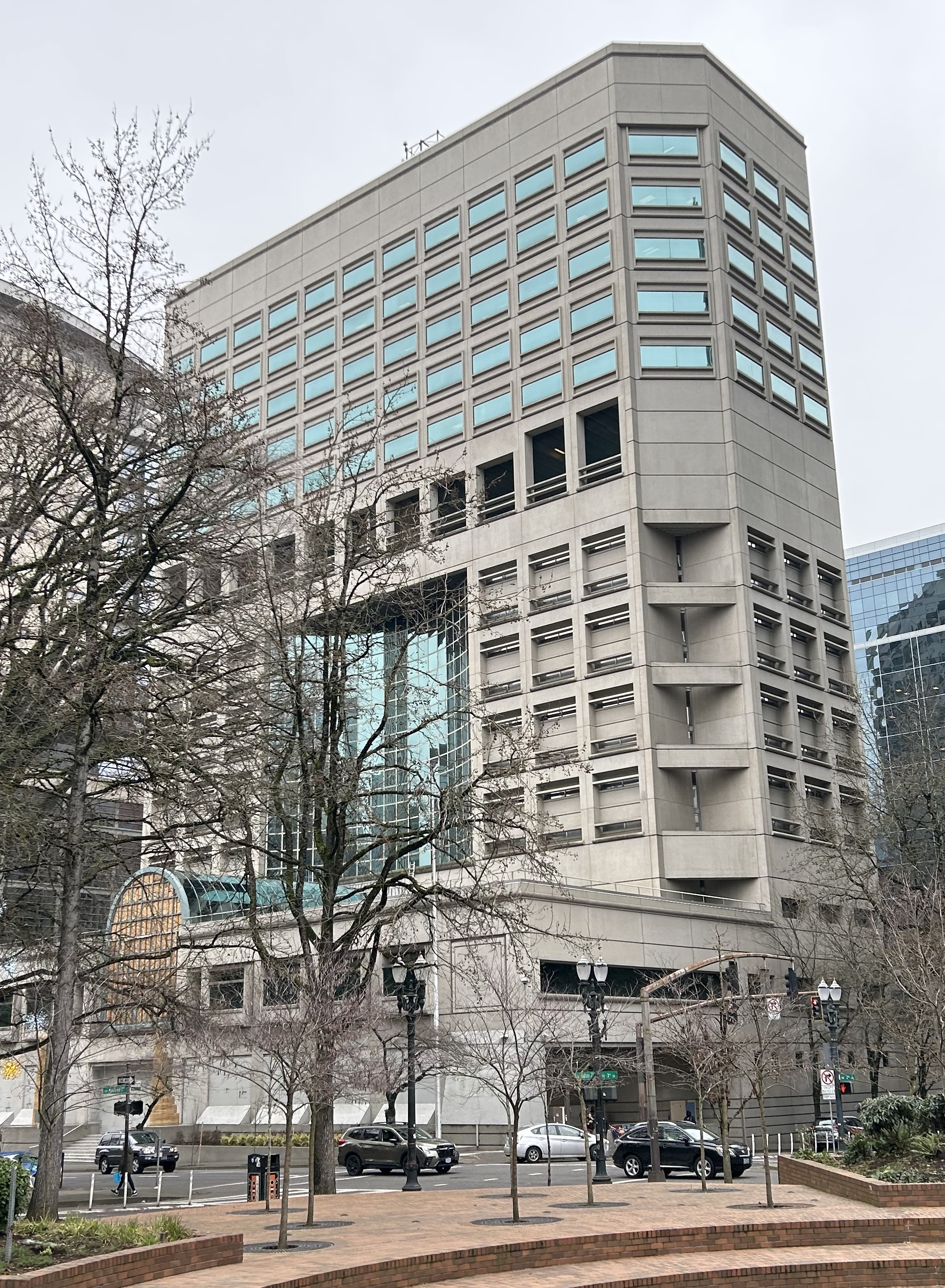
- The building's exterior in 2025
- Interactive map of the Multnomah County Justice Center area

General information
- Location: 1120 Southwest 3rd Avenue, Portland, Oregon, United States
- Coordinates: 45.5152078°N 122.676989°W
- Opened: 1983

Design and construction
- Architecture firm: ZGF Architects

The Multnomah County Justice Center, or simply Justice Center, is a building located at 1120 Southwest 3rd Avenue in Portland, Oregon, United States. The building was designed by ZGF Architects. It is adjacent to Lownsdale Square in downtown Portland.

The building houses Portland Police Bureau's (PPB) Central Precinct on the bottom floors, followed by the Multnomah County Detention Center (one of the two county jails) and PPB's headquarters on the top floors. It also contains four court rooms of the Multnomah County Circuit Court, used mainly for arraignments. It was partially built with highway funds when Rocky Butte Jail was demolished to make way for Interstate 205.

== History ==
Many of the George Floyd and police brutality protests in Portland were centered near the building.
