= Killing of Kendra James =

2003 police murder in Portland, Oregon, US

- Date: May 5, 2003; 23 years ago
- Location: Portland, Oregon, U.S.
- Type: Homicide by shooting
- Deaths: Kendra James

Kendra James was a 21-year-old African-American Oregonian mother of two, who was fatally shot by police on May 5, 2003. The incident sparked a controversy over the use of deadly force by the Portland Police Bureau in Portland, Oregon.

James was a passenger in a car stopped by Portland police officers Rick Bean, Kenneth Reynolds, and Scott McCollister. The driver, Terry Jackson, was arrested and placed in a squad car after he was discovered to have an outstanding warrant. After he and another passenger in the car were removed peaceably by the officers, James jumped from the back seat into the driver's seat. McCollister then made several unsuccessful attempts to remove James while partially within the vehicle through an open door. He claimed to have tried to pull James out by her hair, and also attempted to use a taser. He falsely said that he had also attempted to use pepper spray to subdue James, but was unable to operate the canister. An investigation by the Portland Police Bureau found McCollister's pepper spray canister was operational, but no traces of spray were found. McCollister drew his firearm and held it to James' head, demanding she exit the vehicle. McCollister said he then felt the car move and, concerned that he could have fallen out and been run over, fired a single shot.

Several members of Portland City Council were unimpressed with police chief Mark Kroeker's performance at a community forum in North Portland shortly after James' death, and his handling of the incident has been described as having "led to his sudden exit."

The James family's lawyers questioned whether evidence existed regarding James attempting to move the car, and whether the tactics McCollister used, especially his attempt to enter the car (McCollister said that he was 80% in the car), were consistent with police training. Several witnesses alleged that McCollister did not fire while within the car; powder residue testing indicated that McCollister's handgun was at least 30 to 48 inches away from James when discharged, a fact which lawyers for James' family alleged was inconsistent with McCollister's version of events. Multnomah County District Attorney Mike Schrunk declined to hold a public inquest into James' death.
