= Golden West (Portland, Oregon) =

Historic building in Portland, Oregon, U.S.

- Golden West Hotel
- U.S. National Register of Historic Places
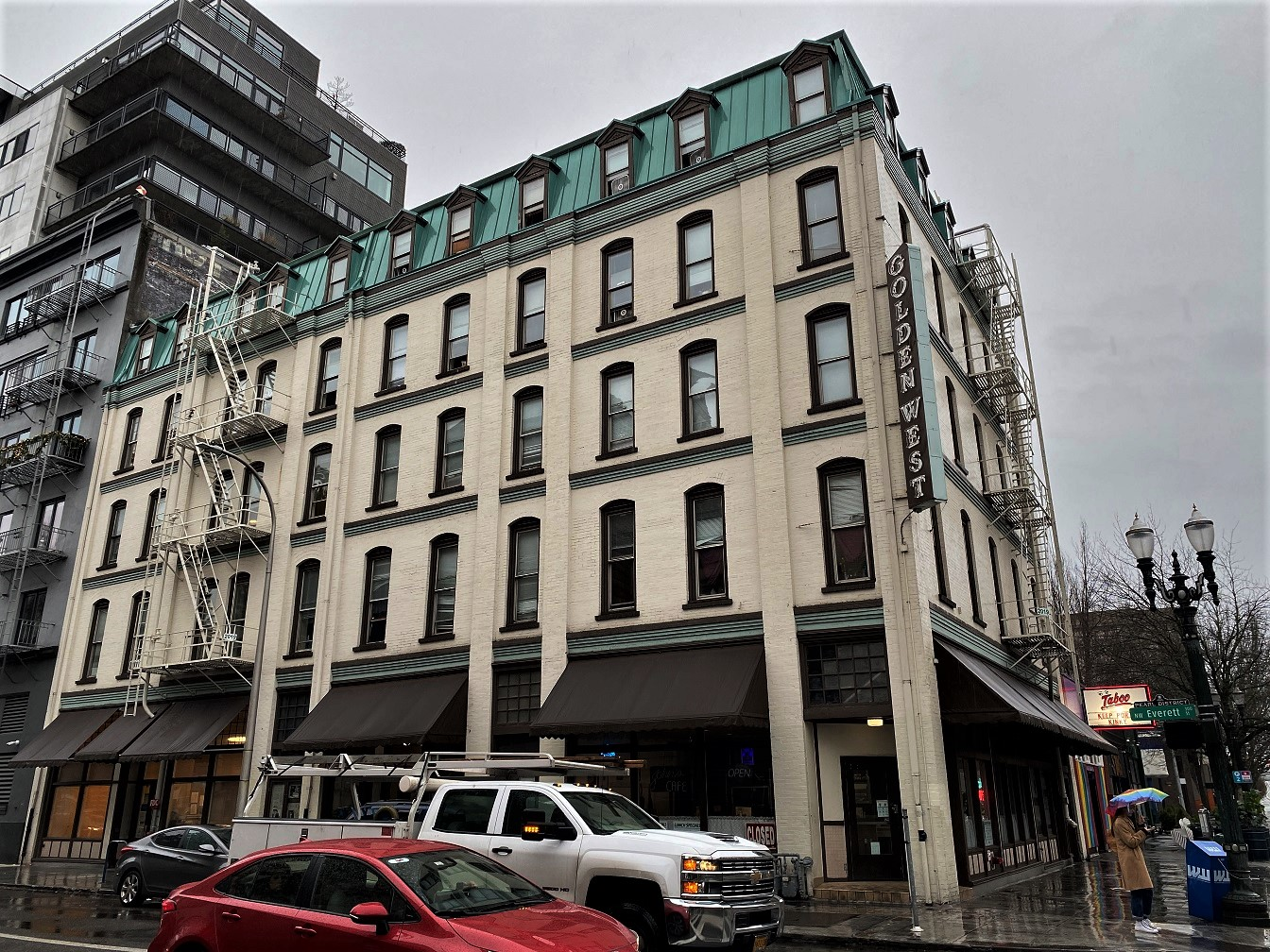

- Location within Oregon
- Location: 707 NW Everett St., Portland, Oregon
- Coordinates: 45°31′31″N 122°40′41″W
- Area: less than one acre
- MPS: African American Resources in Portland, Oregon, from 1851 to 1973 MPS
- NRHP reference No.: 100007456
- Added to NRHP: February 22, 2022

The Golden West is an historic building in Portland, Oregon in the United States. Located at the intersection of Broadway and Everett streets in northwest Portland's Pearl District, the structure is also known as the Broadmoor Hotel, Golden West Hotel, and New Golden West Building. The original five-story hotel was operated by William D. Allen, a former railroad worker and Black man for twenty-five years in the early 20th century. In the 21st century, the building has been operated by Central City Concern, a non-profit agency.

According to KOIN, the building is "one of the most important landmarks in Portland's Black history" and was "the center of Black life in Portland" during the early 1900s. The city of Portland nominated the structure for inclusion on the National Register of Historic Places; and the listing was approved in February 2022.

== See also ==
- National Register of Historic Places listings in Northwest Portland, Oregon
