= Penny Harrington =

American police officer (1942–2021)

- Born: March 2, 1942; Lansing, Michigan, U.S.
- Died: September 15, 2021 (aged 79); Morro Bay, California, U.S.
- Known for: First female chief of the Portland Police Bureau, making her the first female to head a major police department in the United States
- Spouse: Gary Harrington (divorced)

Penny E. Harrington (March 2, 1942 – September 15, 2021) was an American police officer who became the first female chief of the Portland Police Bureau, making her the first female to head a major police department in the United States.

== Career ==
Harrington began working as a policewoman in 1964, when there were only 12 women in her department. She was appointed chief of the Portland Police Bureau in January 1985. An investigative report characterized her administration as a failure after 17 months. The recommendation by a three-member panel appointed by Mayor Bud Clark resulted in her resignation in 1986.

In 1987 Harrington filed a federal sex discrimination suit claiming that members of the police department "conspired to embarrass and drive her from office", making it difficult for her to obtain employment following her "forced" resignation. In 1988 Harrington became a special assistant to the California State Bar's director of investigations to "handle a wide range of special projects, including training and computers".

Harrington died on September 15, 2021, in Morro Bay, California, where she lived.

== Bibliography ==
Harrington was the author of three books. With the NCWP, Harrington helped write Recruiting & Retaining Women: A Self Assessment Guide for Law Enforcement, aimed at helping law enforcement agencies increase and maintain the number of female officers in their units. Harrington also co-authored the text Investigating Sexual Harassment in Law Enforcement Agencies with Kimberly A. Lonsway, to address issues of sexual harassment in fire and police departments and promote proactivity through prevention and training. In 1999, Harrington wrote an autobiography, published by Brittany Publications, Ltd., titled Triumph of Spirit about her successes, trails, and tribulations during her time working for the police force.

== See also ==
- Beverly Harvard
- List of American women's firsts
