= Portland Police Bureau =

Law enforcement agency of Portland, Oregon, U.S.

Coordinates: 45.515204°N 122.676795°W

Portland Bureau of Police
- The patch of the PPB

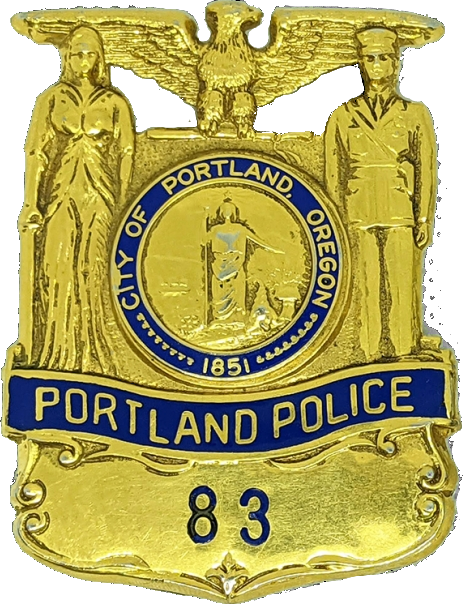
- The badge of the PPB
- Common name: Portland Police Bureau
- Abbreviation: PPB
- Motto: "Sworn to Protect, Dedicated to Serve"

Agency overview
- Formed: 1870
- Preceding agency: Portland Metropolitan Police Force
- Annual budget: $262 million (2023)

Jurisdictional structure
- Map of Portland Bureau of Police's jurisdiction
- General nature: Local civilian police

Operational structure
- Headquarters: Multnomah County Justice Center
- Police Officers: ▼820 of 877 (October 2026)
- Civilians: 350
- Agency executives: Bob Day, Chief of Police; Chris Gjovik, Deputy Chief; Craig Dobson, Assistant Chief of Operations; Amanda McMillan, Assistant Chief of Investigations; Chuck Lovell, Assistant Chief of Services

Facilities
- Precincts: 3: North Precinct; Central Precinct; East Precinct

Website
- Official website

The Portland Police Bureau (PPB), officially the Portland Bureau of Police, is the law enforcement agency of the city of Portland, the largest city in the U.S. state of Oregon.

As of October 2026, the Bureau has a staff of 820 sworn staff, 281 non-sworn administrative personnel, and 16 Public Safety Support Specialists.

Prior to 2025, when Portland operated under a city commission form of government, oversight of Portland's bureaus shifted among the five City Commissioners, with the mayor being assigned to the Police Bureau as the police commissioner due to tradition. As of January 1, 2025, the chief of police acts as the primary executive of the agency.

== History ==
From 1851 to 1870, Portland was policed by a town marshal. After 1861, the marshal was empowered to hire deputies, but they did not have permanent jobs until late in the 1860s. In 1870, the Portland City Council established the police bureau, originally called the Portland Metropolitan Police Force.

On April 1, 1908, the bureau became the first in the United States to hire a female police officer, Lola Baldwin, who became the Superintendent of its newly established Women's Protective Division

In 2011, the Department of Justice began an investigation into civil rights violations at the PPB. This resulted in the United States v. City of Portland settlement regarding their use of force.

PPB was involved in an ongoing series of protests beginning in May 2020 following the murder of George Floyd. The PPB were supplemented with federal agents deployed by President Donald Trump who have reportedly arrested rioters and Antifa off the streets from unmarked police vehicles for detainment without reading Miranda Rights, providing cause, or identifying themselves. During these protests, Mayor and police commissioner Ted Wheeler was tear gassed.

In response to the COVID-19 pandemic, the Oregon Legislative Assembly passed a law exempting law enforcement officers from vaccine mandates due to pushback from officers and the Portland Police Association.

== Organization and structure ==
=== Precincts ===
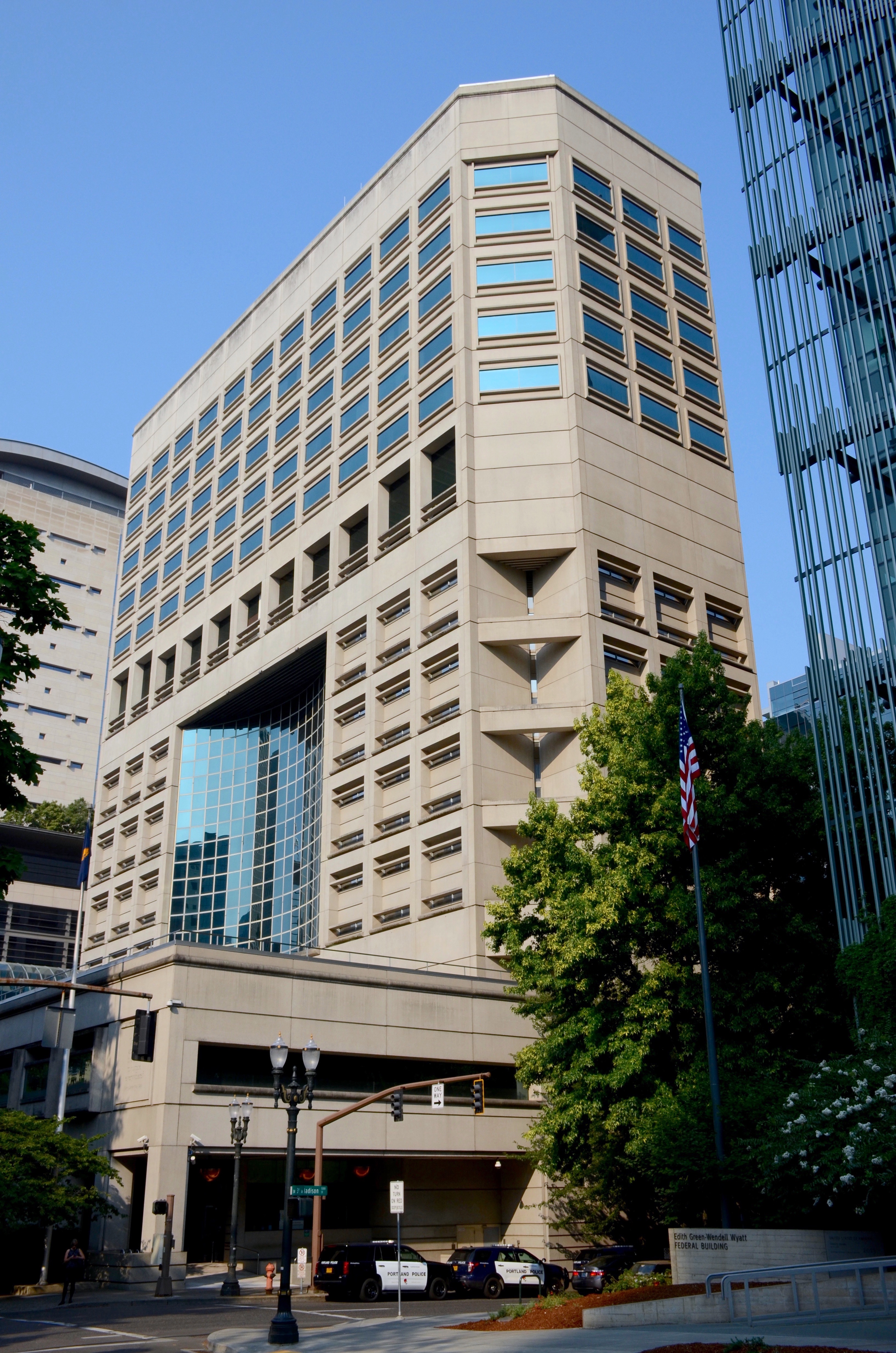
The Multnomah County Justice Center serves as headquarters of the Portland Police Bureau and is also home to the Central Precinct and one of the Multnomah County Jails

The Portland Police Bureau divides Portland into three precincts, with each precinct divided into as many as 20 districts. The divisions are generally based on neighborhood association boundaries, but also take into account the number of police calls generated in each district. The district serves as the basic unit of territory within the bureau, and most districts are assigned between one and two patrol officers. As such, busier districts are geographically smaller and slower districts are larger.

The infrastructure of each precinct is essentially the same, though the number of officers in each precinct is adjusted continually through transfers, new hires and attrition.

Portland Police Bureau Precincts
Precinct	Commander
Central Precinct	Brian Hughes
North Precinct	Rob Simon
East Precinct	Jake Jensen

=== Rank Structure ===
Police officers receive the rank of officer immediately after hiring. Sometime after hiring, they go to the Oregon Department of Public Safety Standards and Training police academy in Salem, followed by an "advanced academy" at PPB's training center in the Wilkes neighborhood. Depending on class space at the state academy, officers may perform limited, primarily administrative, police functions while waiting for the academy. Following training, officers have a 18-month probationary period with a field training officer.

After 4.5 years of service as a police officer, 3 of which must be at PPB, officers may take a promotional exam to become either a detective, sergeant, or criminalist.

Public Safety Support Specialists are unsworn and unarmed officers who respond to non-violent crimes to take reports. Police cadets are teenagers learning about policing. They assist with community events, traffic control, and learn leadership skills. It is similar to the Police Explorer program.

Title	Insignia	Badge
Chief of Police		
Deputy Chief		
Assistant Chief		
Commander		
Captain		
Lieutenant		
Sergeant		
Detective or Criminalist	No Insignia	
Police Officer	No Insignia	
Probationary Police Officer	No Insignia	
Public Safety Support Specialist	No Insignia	None
Cadet	No Insignia	

=== Oversight ===
The Portland Independent Police Review is a civilian oversight board that hears and investigates complaints related to law enforcement. When the office receives a complaint, it attempts to obtain physical evidence, makes a list of people to talk to, and interviews everyone involved.

The duties of this office will be overtaken by the Community Police Oversight Board, which should be operational by late 2025. In June 2020, during the George Floyd protests in Portland, Oregon, the office recorded 185 complaints.

The 'Portland Community Police Oversight Board’ was authorized to be created in 2020 when Portlanders voted to amend the city charter to include it. It will replace the Portland Independent Police Review.

As of September 2024, a Judge gave the city one year operationalize the board.

== Equipment ==
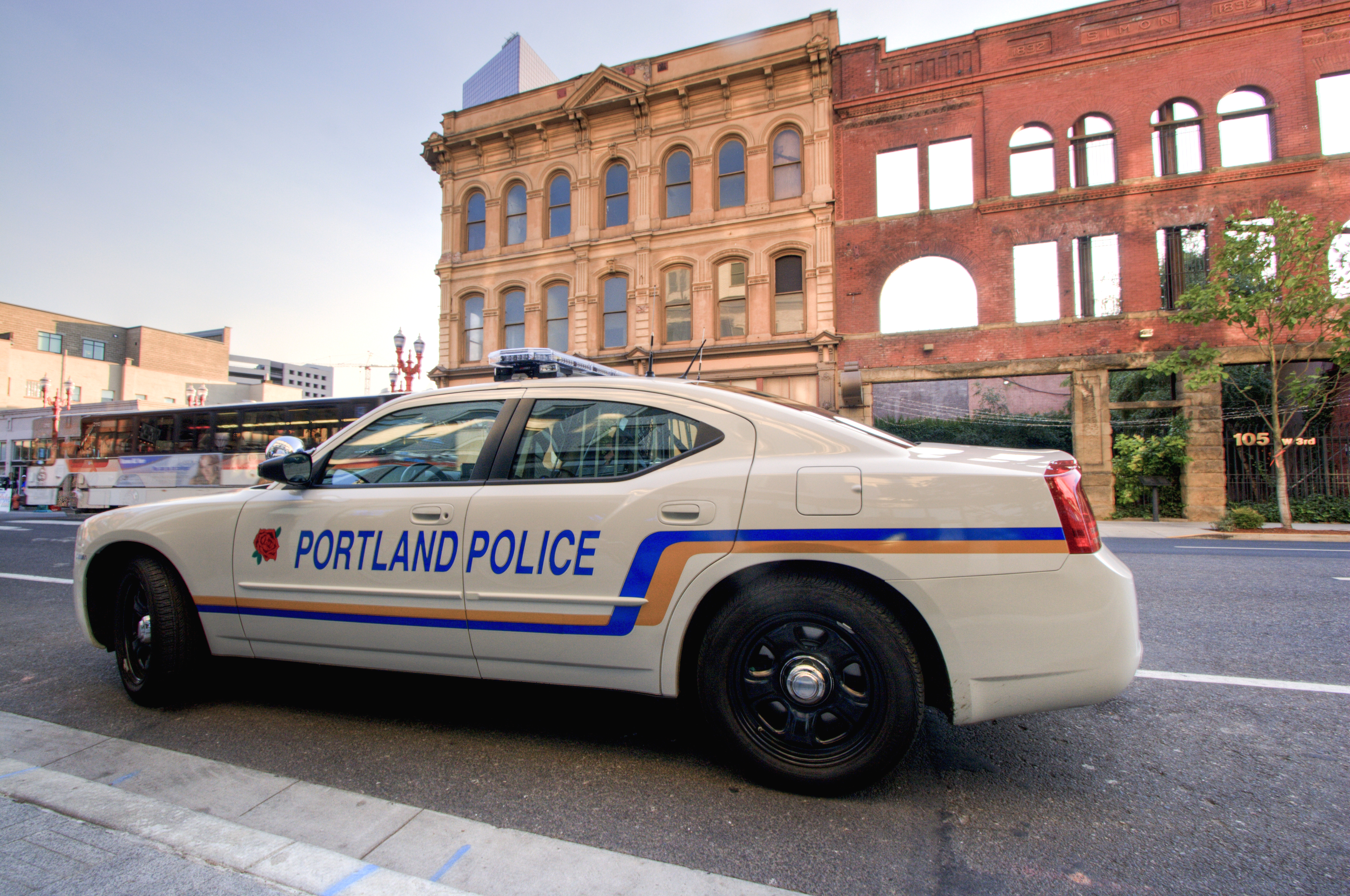
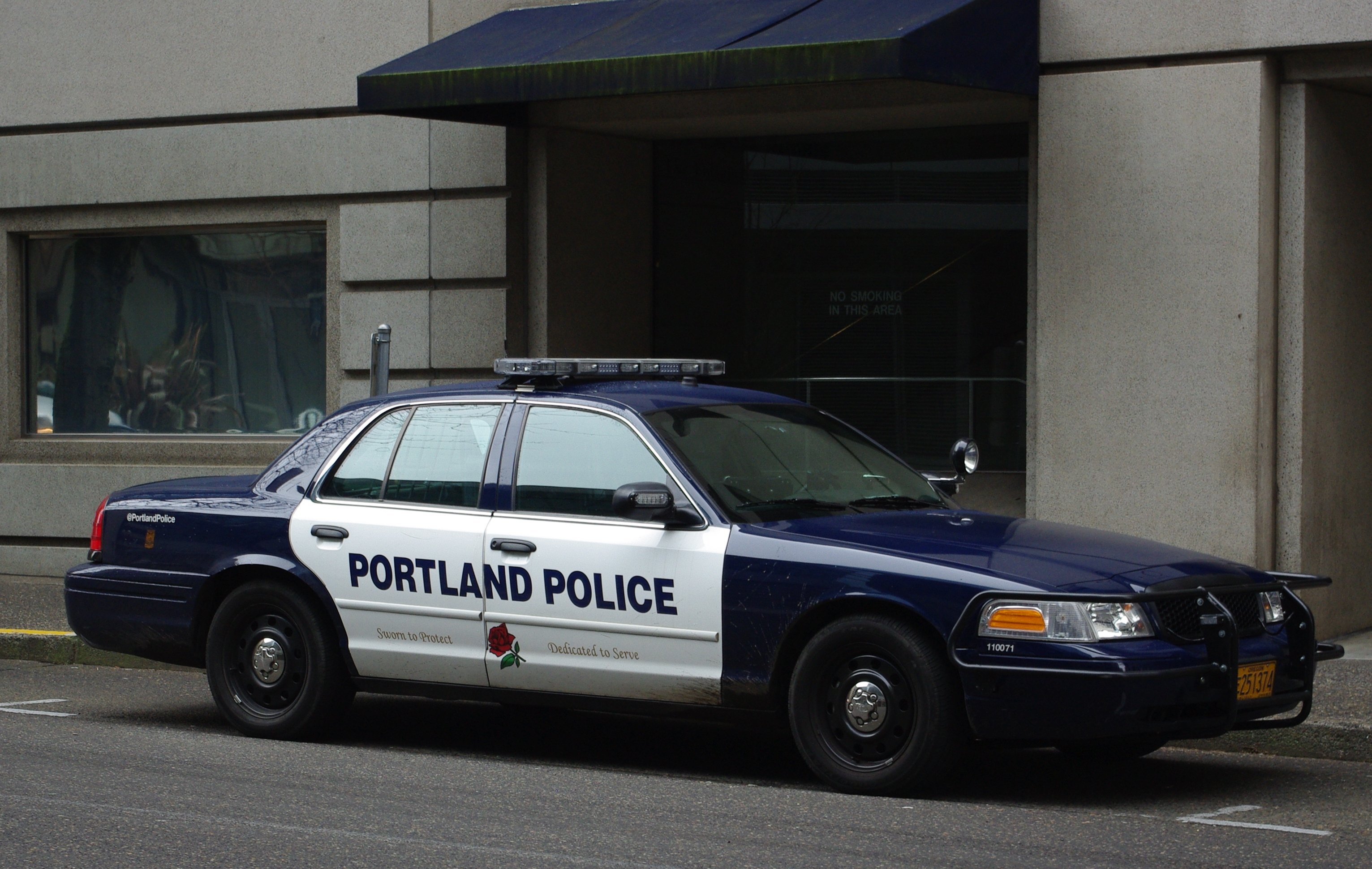
Portland police vehicles with pre-2013 and 2013-2023 livery.

=== Firearms ===
All Portland police officers are armed with a 9mm Glock handgun, either the Glock 17, or the Glock 19. Plainclothes officers carry a Glock 26.

=== Non-lethal weapons ===
Portland Police Bureau has a LRAD "sound cannon".

=== Body cameras ===
In 2014, PPB began exploring the idea of issuing body-worn cameras as part of a US Department of Justice lawsuit about unconstitutional use of force, United States v. City of Portland. After years of negotiations on body-camera policies, On June 17, 2024, PPB officers in the Central Precinct were outfitted with cameras as part of a pilot-program. In August of that year, all officers were outfitted with the cameras. Portland had been the largest city without police body cameras.

== Portland Police Association ==
Most of the bureau's rank-and-file employees are represented by the Portland Police Association union. The union also represents 911 call takers and dispatchers, who work for the Bureau of Emergency Communication.

On July 1, 2020, the city and the PPA renewed its annual contract, with an agreement to permit a newly formed Portland Street Response team, promoted by Commissioner Jo Ann Hardesty, for emergency situations that don't require firearms, and an agreement on the delay of cost-of-living adjustment due to city budget issues related to COVID-19.

== Popular culture ==
- The 2011-2017 NBC drama Grimm starring David Giuntoli and Russell Hornsby follows a Portland Police Detective who fights mythological creatures. Multiple characters on the show are members of the PPB.
- The 2015 Fox series Backstrom follows a team of 'eccentric criminologists' in the PPB led by an "overweight, offensive, irascible" commanding officer played by Rainn Wilson.
- The ABC show Stumptown follows a Portland-based private investigator played by Cobie Smulders who frequently works with officers from PPB.

== Police Chiefs ==
- James H. Lappeus (1st term November 1, 1870 – June 17, 1877)
- Lucerne Besser (June 18, 1877 – October 29, 1879)
- James H. Lappeus (2nd term October 30, 1879 – June 30, 1883)
- William H. Watkinds (July 18, 1883 – April 23, 1884)
- Samuel B. Parrish (April 24, 1884 – July 31, 1892)
- Ernest W. Spencer (August 1, 1892 – November 11, 1892)
- Charles H. Hunt (November 12, 1892 – July 31, 1894, and below)
- John W. Minto (August 1, 1894 – October 5, 1896)
- L. W. "Doc" Robertson (October 6, 1896 – March 10, 1897)
- John Myers (March 11, 1897 – June 8, 1897)
- Patrick J. Barry (June 9, 1897 – July 2, 1897)
- Michael J. Clohessy (July 3, 1897 – June 30, 1898)
- Daniel M. McLaughlin (July 1, 1898 – January 22, 1903)
- Charles H. Hunt (above and January 23, 1903 – July 14, 1905 ? 1906)
- Charles Critzmaucher (July 15, 1906 – July 1, 1909)
- A. M. Cox (July 2, 1909 – June 30, 1911)
- Enoch Glover (July 1, 1911 – June 30, 1913)
- John Clark (July 1, 1913 – July 31, 1917)
- Nelson F. Johnson (August 1, 1917 – November 7, 1919)
- Leon V. Jenkins (November 8, 1919 – June 30, 1933, and below)
- Burton K. Lawson (July 1, 1933 – November 30, 1934)
- Harry M. Niles (December 1, 1934 – June 30, 1946)
- Leon V. Jenkins (above and July 1, 1946 – January 5, 1948)
- James Fleming (January 6, 1948 – December 31, 1948)
- Charles P. Pray (January 1, 1949 – April 30, 1951)
- Donald I. McNamara (April 1, 1951 – January 2, 1953, and below) [dates given conflict]
- James W. Purcell Jr. (January 1, 1953 – January 1, 1957)
- William J. Hilbruner (January 1, 1957 – November 12, 1960)
- David H. Johnson (November 21, 1960 – July 8, 1964)
- Donald McNamara (acting Chief July 9–22, 1964. Chief July 23, 1964 – January 1974)
- Bruce R. Baker (January 15, 1974 – May 31, 1981)
- Ronald R. Still (June 1, 1981 – January 4, 1985)
- Gary M. Haynes (January 4, 1985 – January 23, 1985)
- Penny Harrington (January 24, 1985 – June 2, 1986)
- Robert M. Tobin (June 2, 1986 – August 20, 1986)
- James T. Davis (August 20, 1986 – April 7, 1987)
- Richard D. Walker (April 7, 1987 – November 18, 1990)
- Thomas J. Potter (November 19, 1990 – June 29, 1993)
- Charles A. Moose (June 29, 1993 – August 1999)
- Mark A. Kroeker (August 1999 – August 29, 2003)
- Derrick Foxworth (August 29, 2003 – June 2006)
- Rosie Sizer (June 22, 2006 – May 12, 2010, fired by Mayor Adams after holding a PPB press conference to criticize his funding decisions)
- Michael Reese (May 12, 2010 – January 2, 2015, retired)
- Larry O'Dea (January 2, 2015 – March 27, 2016, resigned after attempting to cover up an incident where he accidentally shot a friend while drunk on a hunting trip)
- Donna Henderson (Interim) (March 27, 2016 – June 27, 2016)
- Michael Marshman (June 27, 2016 – August 24, 2017)
- Chris Uehara (interim) (August 24, 2017 – October 2, 2017)
- Danielle Outlaw (October 2, 2017 – December 31, 2019)
- Jami Resch (December 31, 2019 – June 8, 2020)
- Chuck Lovell (June 8, 2020 – October 11, 2023)
- Bob Day (October 11, 2023 – Present)

== See also ==
- Portland Police Bureau and the LGBTQ community
- List of law enforcement agencies in Oregon
- Multnomah County Sheriff's Office
- Multnomah County Sheriff's Office Search and Rescue
- Sunshine Division
