= List of members of the Portland City Council =

This is a list of members of the Portland City Council in Oregon, both past and present.

From 1913 to 2025, the city operated under a commission form of government, where all 5 members of the council, officially called the City Commission, were elected at-large. The city commission also included the mayor. Beginning in January 2025, the city switched to a mayor-council form of government, with 12 members, not including the mayor, were elected from four geographic districts.

== 1851-1861 ==
Portland City Council members, 1851-1861
Session	Mayor	Councilors								
1851	Hugh O'Bryant	Robert Thompson	Shubrick Norris	George A. Barnes	Thomas G. Robinson	L. B. Hastings				
1852	A. C. Bonnell	W. P. Abrams	A. P. Dennison	Thomas Pritchard	Abell G. Tripp	Hiram Smith				
1852	Simon B. Marye	Shubrick Norris	A. P. Dennison	Thomas Pritchard	Philip A. Marquam	Josiah Failing				
1853	Josiah Failing	Robert Thompson	William S. Ladd	John H. Couch	W. P. Abrams	R. N. McLaren	R. N. Field	Charles B. Pillow	H. W. Davis	Jonas Williams
1854	William S. Ladd	A. M. Starr	James Field Jr.	Shubrick Norris	Thomas Carter	William McMillan	A. D. Fitch	O. J. Backus	A. R. Shipley	James Turnbull
1855	George W. Vaughn	George Kittridge	John Green	H. S. Jacobs	Matthew Patton	Lewis Love	John C. Carson	Thomas Hartness	E. B. Calhoun	G. Collier Robbins
1856	James O'Neill	Robert Porter	A. D. Shelby	A. B. Elfeldt	A. M. Starr	William S. Ladd	William Beck	H. W. Davis	S. M. Smith	James Burke
1857	James O'Neill	John H. Couch	T. J. Holmes	Absalom Barrett Hallock	Charles Hutchins	P. Hardenburg	N. S. Coon	B. F. Goodwin	Simeon Gannett Reed	James M. Blossom
1858	William S. Ladd	John H. Couch	T. J. Holmes	Absalom Barrett Hallock	Charles Hutchins	P. Hardenburg	N. S. Coon	B. F. Goodwin	Simeon Gannett Reed	James M. Blossom
1858	A. M. Starr	G. Collier Robbins	Alexander P. Ankeny	C. P. Bacon	T. N. Lakin	R. Porter	T. J. Homes	J. C. Carson	William King	C. S. Kingsley
1859	S. J. McCormick	Absalom Barrett Hallock	J. M. Vansyckle	J. Davidson	A. D. Shelby	M. M. Lucas	James C. Hawthorne	Erasmus D. Shattuck	A. C. R. Shaw	John Blanchard
1860	G. Collier Robbins	Absalom Barrett Hallock	John C. Ainsworth	J. Davidson	A. D. Shelby	M. M. Lucas	W. L. Higgins	Erasmus D. Shattuck	A. C. R. Shaw	Jacob Stitzel
1861	John M. Breck	Absalom Barrett Hallock	John McCraken	F. Harbaugh	W. C. Hull	William M. King	W. L. Higgins	E. R. Scott	William Masters	John S. White
1861	John M. Breck	Absalom Barrett Hallock	John McCraken	F. Harbaugh	W. C. Hull	William M. King	W. L. Higgins	S. E. Barr	William Masters	John S. White

== 1862-1889 ==
Portland City Council members, 1862-1889
Year	Mayor	President	Ward								
Year	Mayor	President	1			2			3		
1862	William H. Farrar		Thomas A. Davis	Thomas J. Holmes	Absalom Barrett Hallock	O. Risley	A. P. Dennison	J. M. Breck	S. Coffin	C. S. Silvers	A. G. Walling
1863	William H. Farrar	O. Risley	N. Williams	Thomas J. Holmes	Absalom Barrett Hallock	O. Risley	A. P. Dennison		S. Coffin	C. S. Silvers	A. G. Walling
1863-64	David Logan	John Sutton	Al Zieber	H. Saxer	Alexander Dodge	John Sutton	I. A. Austin	P. S. Watson	M. M. Lucas	Joseph Knott	David Monastes
1864-65	Henry Failing		James W. Cook	John McCracken	A. M. Starr	William H. Bennett	J. J. Hoffman	Thomas Robertson	Thomas Frazer	S.Gilmore	Israel Garden
1865-66	Henry Failing		P. C. Schuyler	John McCracken	Robert R. Thompson	E. S. Morgan	S. A. Clark	A. Rosenheim	J. P. O. Lownsdale	S.Gilmore	O. P. S. Plummer
1866-67	Thomas J. Holmes		Al Zieber	John McCracken	Absalom Barrett Hallock	M. O'Connor	C. Fechheimer	A. Rosenheim	J. P. O. Lownsdale	T. J. Carter	J. C. Carson
1867-68	J. A. Chapman		A. C. Ripley	John McCracken	Absalom Barrett Hallock	R. Porter	C. Fechheimer	A. Rosenheim	Lucerne Besser	C. D. Burch	M. F. Mulky
1868-69	Hamilton Boyd		A. C. Ripley	William Cree	Absalom Barrett Hallock	R. Porter	J. M. Breck		Lucerne Besser	C. D. Burch	Charles Hopkins
1869-70	Bernard Goldsmith		A. C. Ripley	William Cree	C. Bills	R. Porter	J. M. Breck	W. Moffet	Lucerne Besser	D. C. Lewis	Charles Hopkins
1870-71	Bernard Goldsmith		Absalom Barrett Hallock	William Cree	C. Bills	J. B. Congle	J. M. Breck	W. Moffet	Lucerne Besser	William Lair Hill	J. M. Drake
1871-72	Phillip Wasserman		Absalom Barrett Hallock	George L. Story	E. M. Burton	J. B. Congle	J. M. Caywood	W. Moffet	Lucerne Besser	William Lair Hill	R. G. Combs
1872-73	Phillip Wasserman		Absalom Barrett Hallock	George L. Story	E. M. Burton	J. B. Congle	J. M. Caywood	E. F. Russell	Lucerne Besser	William Lair Hill	Julius C. Moreland
1873-74	Henry Failing		G. W. Hoyt	George L. Story	E. M. Burton	J. H. Lyon	J. M. Caywood	E. F. Russell	Lucerne Besser	William Lair Hill	Julius C. Moreland
1874-75	Henry Failing		G. W. Hoyt	George L. Story	Robert R. Thompson	J. H. Lyon	John Catlin	E. F. Russell	Lucerne Besser	Elijah Corbett	Julius C. Moreland
1875-76	J. A. Chapman		G. W. Hoyt	H. D. Sandborn	J. R. Wiley	William H. Andrus	John Catlin	Stephen G. Skidmore	Lucerne Besser	Elijah Corbett	E. J. W. Stemme
1876-77	J. A. Chapman		Thomas Stephens	D. F. Harrington	J. R. Wiley	William H. Andrus	S. Blumeauer	Stephen G. Skidmore	Noah Lambert	Elijah Corbett	E. J. W. Stemme
1877-78	William Spencer Newbury		Thomas Stephens	F. Opitz	J. R. Wiley	William H. Andrus	Joseph Simon	Stephen G. Skidmore	Noah Lambert	G. W. Yocum	E. J. W. Stemme
1878-79	William Spencer Newbury		Thomas Stephens	F. Opitz	J. W. Payne	William H. Andrus	Joseph Simon	E. H. Stolte	Noah Lambert	G. W. Yocum	H. Weber
1879-80	David P. Thompson		R. Gerdes	F. Opitz	J. W. Payne	T. L. Nicklin	Joseph Simon	E. H. Stolte	J. F. Watson	J. S. Keller	H. Weber
1880-81	David P. Thompson		R. Gerdes	J. S. Raleigh	Henry Hewett	T. L. Nicklin	William H. Andrus	E. H. Stolte	J. B. Kellogg	J. S. Keller	H. Weber
1881-82	David P. Thompson		R. Gerdes	J. S. Raleigh	Henry Hewett	T. L. Nicklin	Charles Homan	W. L. Chittenden	J. B. Kellogg	J. S. Keller	W. B. Honeyman
1882-83	J. A. Chapman		D. Mackay	J. E. Smith	Henry Hewett	W. S. Scoggin	Charles Homan	W. L. Chittenden	J. B. Kellogg	W. H. Adams	W. B. Honeyman
1883-84	J. A. Chapman		R. Gerdes	J. E. Smith	J. B. Hailey	W. S. Scoggin	William H. Andrus	W. L. Chittenden	A. F. Sears Jr.	W. H. Adams	W. B. Honeyman
1884-85	J. A. Chapman		R. Gerdes	J. E. Smith	J. J. Holland	W. S. Scoggin	William H. Andrus	C. M. Forbes	A. F. Sears Jr.	W. H. Adams	William Fliedner
1885-86	John Gates		R. Gerdes	J. J. Gallagher	J. J. Holland	S. Farrell	William H. Andrus	C. M. Forbes	A. F. Sears Jr.	F. Hacheny	William Fliedner
1886-87	John Gates		R. Gerdes	J. J. Gallagher	J. J. Holland	S. Farrell	R. H. Schwab	C. M. Forbes	Tyler Woodward	F. Hacheny	William Fliedner
1887-88	John Gates		R. Gerdes	C. Castendeick	J. J. Holland	S. Farrell	R. H. Schwab	C. M. Forbes	Tyler Woodward	F. Hacheny	William Fliedner
1888-89	Van B. DeLashmutt	Tyler Woodward	R. Gerdes	C. Castendeick	Richard Hoyt	S. Farrell	R. H. Schwab	C. M. Forbes	Tyler Woodward	William Showers	William Fliedner

== 1913-2024 ==
Portland City Commissioners, 1913-2024
Year	Mayor	Commissioner #1	Commissioner #2	Commissioner #3	Commissioner #4
1913	H. Russell Albee	Will H. Daly	Robert Dieck	William L. Brewster	C. A. Bigelow¹
1914	H. Russell Albee	Will H. Daly	Robert Dieck	William L. Brewster	C. A. Bigelow¹
1915	H. Russell Albee	Will H. Daly	Robert Dieck	George L. Baker	C. A. Bigelow¹
1916	H. Russell Albee	Will H. Daly	Robert Dieck	George L. Baker	C. A. Bigelow¹
1917	George L. Baker	Asbury Barbur	John M. Mann²	Dan Kellaher³	C. A. Bigelow¹
1918	George L. Baker	Asbury Barbur	John M. Mann²	Dan Kellaher³	C. A. Bigelow¹
1919	George L. Baker	Asbury Barbur	John M. Mann²	Stanhope C. Pier	C. A. Bigelow¹
1920	George L. Baker	Asbury Barbur	John M. Mann²	Stanhope C. Pier	C. A. Bigelow¹
1921	George L. Baker	Asbury Barbur	John M. Mann²	Stanhope C. Pier	C. A. Bigelow¹
1922	George L. Baker	Asbury Barbur	John M. Mann²	Stanhope C. Pier	C. A. Bigelow¹
1923	George L. Baker	Asbury Barbur	John M. Mann²	Stanhope C. Pier	C. A. Bigelow¹
1924	George L. Baker	Asbury Barbur	John M. Mann²	Stanhope C. Pier	C. A. Bigelow¹
1925	George L. Baker	Asbury Barbur	John M. Mann²	Stanhope C. Pier	C. A. Bigelow¹
1926	George L. Baker	Asbury Barbur	John M. Mann²	Stanhope C. Pier	C. A. Bigelow¹
1927	George L. Baker	Asbury Barbur	John M. Mann²	Stanhope C. Pier	C. A. Bigelow¹
1928	George L. Baker	Asbury Barbur	John M. Mann²	Stanhope C. Pier	C. A. Bigelow¹
1929	George L. Baker	Asbury Barbur	John M. Mann²	Stanhope C. Pier	C. A. Bigelow¹
1930	George L. Baker	Asbury Barbur	John M. Mann²	Stanhope C. Pier	Earl Riley³
1931	George L. Baker	Asbury Barbur	John M. Mann²	Earl Riley	Ralph C. Clyde
1932	George L. Baker	Asbury Barbur	A. G. Johnson³	Earl Riley	Ralph C. Clyde
1933	Joseph K. Carson	Earl Riley	Ralph C. Clyde†	Ormond R. Bean¹	J. E. Bennett²
1934	Joseph K. Carson	Earl Riley	Ralph C. Clyde†	Ormond R. Bean¹	J. E. Bennett²
1935	Joseph K. Carson	Earl Riley	Ralph C. Clyde†	Ormond R. Bean¹	J. E. Bennett²
1936	Joseph K. Carson	Earl Riley	Ralph C. Clyde†	Ormond R. Bean¹	J. E. Bennett²
1937	Joseph K. Carson	Earl Riley	Ralph C. Clyde†	Ormond R. Bean¹	J. E. Bennett²
1938	Joseph K. Carson	Earl Riley	Ralph C. Clyde†	Ormond R. Bean¹	J. E. Bennett²
1939	Joseph K. Carson	Earl Riley	Ralph C. Clyde†	William A. Bowes³	J. E. Bennett²
1940	Joseph K. Carson	Earl Riley	Ralph C. Clyde†	William A. Bowes³	J. E. Bennett²
1941	Earl Riley	Fred L. Peterson	Ralph C. Clyde†	William A. Bowes³	Kenneth L. Cooper³
1942	Earl Riley	Fred L. Peterson	Ralph C. Clyde†	William A. Bowes³	Kenneth L. Cooper³
1943	Earl Riley	Fred L. Peterson	Dorothy McCullough Lee³	William A. Bowes³	Kenneth L. Cooper³
1944	Earl Riley	Fred L. Peterson	Dorothy McCullough Lee³	William A. Bowes³	Kenneth L. Cooper³
1945	Earl Riley	Fred L. Peterson	Dorothy McCullough Lee³	William A. Bowes³	Kenneth L. Cooper³
1946	Earl Riley	Fred L. Peterson	Dorothy McCullough Lee³	William A. Bowes³	Kenneth L. Cooper³
1947	Earl Riley	Fred L. Peterson	Dorothy McCullough Lee³	William A. Bowes³	Kenneth L. Cooper³
1948	Earl Riley	Fred L. Peterson	Dorothy McCullough Lee³	William A. Bowes³	Kenneth L. Cooper³
1949	Dorothy McCullough Lee	Fred L. Peterson	Ormond R. Bean	William A. Bowes³	Kenneth L. Cooper³
1950	Dorothy McCullough Lee	Fred L. Peterson	Ormond R. Bean	William A. Bowes³	Kenneth L. Cooper³
1951	Dorothy McCullough Lee	Fred L. Peterson	Ormond R. Bean	William A. Bowes³	J. E. Bennet
1952	Dorothy McCullough Lee	Nathan A. Boody³	Ormond R. Bean	William A. Bowes³	J. E. Bennet
1953	Fred L. Peterson	Nathan A. Boody³	Ormond R. Bean	William A. Bowes³	Stanley Earl
1954	Fred L. Peterson	Nathan A. Boody³	Ormond R. Bean	William A. Bowes³	Stanley Earl
1955	Fred L. Peterson	Nathan A. Boody³	Ormond R. Bean	William A. Bowes³	Stanley Earl
1956	Fred L. Peterson	Nathan A. Boody³	Ormond R. Bean	William A. Bowes³	Stanley Earl
1957	Terry Schrunk	Nathan A. Boody³	Ormond R. Bean	William A. Bowes³	Stanley Earl
1958	Terry Schrunk	Nathan A. Boody³	Ormond R. Bean	William A. Bowes³	Stanley Earl
1959	Terry Schrunk	Mark A. Grayson	Ormond R. Bean	William A. Bowes³	Stanley Earl
1960	Terry Schrunk	Mark A. Grayson	Ormond R. Bean	William A. Bowes³	Stanley Earl
1961	Terry Schrunk	Mark A. Grayson	Ormond R. Bean	William A. Bowes³	Stanley Earl
1962	Terry Schrunk	Mark A. Grayson	Ormond R. Bean	William A. Bowes³	Stanley Earl
1963	Terry Schrunk	Mark A. Grayson	Ormond R. Bean	William A. Bowes³	Stanley Earl
1964	Terry Schrunk	Mark A. Grayson	Ormond R. Bean	William A. Bowes³	Stanley Earl
1965	Terry Schrunk	Mark A. Grayson	Ormond R. Bean	William A. Bowes³	Stanley Earl
1966	Terry Schrunk	Mark A. Grayson	Ormond R. Bean	William A. Bowes³	Stanley Earl
1967	Terry Schrunk	Stanley Earl†	Mark A. Grayson	Frank Ivancie*	William A. Bowes†
1968	Terry Schrunk	Stanley Earl†	Mark A. Grayson	Frank Ivancie*	William A. Bowes†
1969	Terry Schrunk	Stanley Earl†	Mark A. Grayson	Frank Ivancie*	Lloyd Anderson¹
1970	Terry Schrunk	Connie McCready**	Mark A. Grayson	Frank Ivancie*	Lloyd Anderson¹
1971	Terry Schrunk	Connie McCready**	Neil Goldschmidt*	Frank Ivancie*	Lloyd Anderson¹
1972	Terry Schrunk	Connie McCready**	Neil Goldschmidt*	Frank Ivancie*	Lloyd Anderson¹
1973	Neil Goldschmidt¹	Connie McCready**	Mildred Schwab	Frank Ivancie*	Lloyd Anderson¹
1974	Neil Goldschmidt¹	Connie McCready**	Mildred Schwab	Frank Ivancie*	Charles Jordan¹³
1975	Neil Goldschmidt¹	Connie McCready**	Mildred Schwab	Frank Ivancie*	Charles Jordan¹³
1976	Neil Goldschmidt¹	Connie McCready**	Mildred Schwab	Frank Ivancie*	Charles Jordan¹³
1977	Neil Goldschmidt¹	Connie McCready**	Mildred Schwab	Frank Ivancie*	Charles Jordan¹³
1978	Neil Goldschmidt¹	Connie McCready**	Mildred Schwab	Frank Ivancie*	Charles Jordan¹³
1979	Connie McCready	Mike Lindberg	Mildred Schwab	Frank Ivancie*	Charles Jordan¹³
1980	Connie McCready	Mike Lindberg	Mildred Schwab	Frank Ivancie*	Charles Jordan¹³
1981	Frank Ivancie	Mike Lindberg	Mildred Schwab	Margaret Strachan	Charles Jordan¹³
1982	Frank Ivancie	Mike Lindberg	Mildred Schwab	Margaret Strachan	Charles Jordan¹³
1983	Frank Ivancie	Mike Lindberg	Mildred Schwab	Margaret Strachan	Charles Jordan¹³
1984	Frank Ivancie	Mike Lindberg	Mildred Schwab	Margaret Strachan	Charles Jordan¹³
1985	Bud Clark	Mike Lindberg	Mildred Schwab	Margaret Strachan	Dick Bogle
1986	Bud Clark	Mike Lindberg	Mildred Schwab	Margaret Strachan	Dick Bogle
1987	Bud Clark	Mike Lindberg	Earl Blumenauer¹	Bob Koch	Dick Bogle
1988	Bud Clark	Mike Lindberg	Earl Blumenauer¹	Bob Koch	Dick Bogle
1989	Bud Clark	Mike Lindberg	Earl Blumenauer¹	Bob Koch	Dick Bogle
1990	Bud Clark	Mike Lindberg	Earl Blumenauer¹	Bob Koch	Dick Bogle
1991	Bud Clark	Mike Lindberg	Earl Blumenauer¹	Gretchen Kafoury	Dick Bogle
1992	Bud Clark	Mike Lindberg	Earl Blumenauer¹	Gretchen Kafoury	Dick Bogle
1993	Vera Katz	Mike Lindberg	Earl Blumenauer¹	Gretchen Kafoury	Charlie Hales¹
1994	Vera Katz	Mike Lindberg	Earl Blumenauer¹	Gretchen Kafoury	Charlie Hales¹
1995	Vera Katz	Mike Lindberg	Earl Blumenauer¹	Gretchen Kafoury	Charlie Hales¹
1996	Vera Katz	Mike Lindberg	Erik Sten¹	Gretchen Kafoury	Charlie Hales¹
1997	Vera Katz	Jim Francesconi	Erik Sten¹	Gretchen Kafoury	Charlie Hales¹
1998	Vera Katz	Jim Francesconi	Erik Sten¹	Gretchen Kafoury	Charlie Hales¹
1999	Vera Katz	Jim Francesconi	Erik Sten¹	Dan Saltzman	Charlie Hales¹
2000	Vera Katz	Jim Francesconi	Erik Sten¹	Dan Saltzman	Charlie Hales¹
2001	Vera Katz	Jim Francesconi	Erik Sten¹	Dan Saltzman	Charlie Hales¹
2002	Vera Katz	Jim Francesconi	Erik Sten¹	Dan Saltzman	Charlie Hales¹
2003	Vera Katz	Jim Francesconi	Erik Sten¹	Dan Saltzman	Randy Leonard
2004	Vera Katz	Jim Francesconi	Erik Sten¹	Dan Saltzman	Randy Leonard
2005	Tom Potter	Sam Adams	Erik Sten¹	Dan Saltzman	Randy Leonard
2006	Tom Potter	Sam Adams	Erik Sten¹	Dan Saltzman	Randy Leonard
2007	Tom Potter	Sam Adams	Erik Sten¹	Dan Saltzman	Randy Leonard
2008	Tom Potter	Sam Adams	Nick Fish	Dan Saltzman	Randy Leonard
2009	Sam Adams	Amanda Fritz	Nick Fish	Dan Saltzman	Randy Leonard
2010	Sam Adams	Amanda Fritz	Nick Fish	Dan Saltzman	Randy Leonard
2011	Sam Adams	Amanda Fritz	Nick Fish	Dan Saltzman	Randy Leonard
2012	Sam Adams	Amanda Fritz	Nick Fish	Dan Saltzman	Randy Leonard
2013	Charlie Hales	Amanda Fritz	Nick Fish	Dan Saltzman	Steve Novick
2014	Charlie Hales	Amanda Fritz	Nick Fish	Dan Saltzman	Steve Novick
2015	Charlie Hales	Amanda Fritz	Nick Fish	Dan Saltzman	Steve Novick
2016	Charlie Hales	Amanda Fritz	Nick Fish	Dan Saltzman	Steve Novick
2017	Ted Wheeler	Amanda Fritz	Nick Fish	Dan Saltzman	Chloe Eudaly
2018	Ted Wheeler	Amanda Fritz	Nick Fish	Dan Saltzman	Chloe Eudaly
2019	Ted Wheeler	Amanda Fritz	Nick Fish	Jo Ann Hardesty	Chloe Eudaly
2020	Ted Wheeler	Amanda Fritz	Dan Ryan	Jo Ann Hardesty	Chloe Eudaly
2021	Ted Wheeler	Carmen Rubio	Dan Ryan	Jo Ann Hardesty	Mingus Mapps
2022	Ted Wheeler	Carmen Rubio	Dan Ryan	Jo Ann Hardesty	Mingus Mapps
2023	Ted Wheeler	Carmen Rubio	Dan Ryan	Rene Gonzalez	Mingus Mapps
2024	Ted Wheeler	Carmen Rubio	Dan Ryan	Rene Gonzalez	Mingus Mapps

¹: resigned

²: recalled

³: council member was originally appointed

†: died in office

*: elected mayor during council term

**: appointed mayor during council term

== 2025-present ==
Portland City Council members, 2025-
Year	Mayor	President	District											
Year	Mayor	President	1			2			3			4		
2025	Keith Wilson	Elana Pirtle-Guiney	Candace Avalos	Loretta Smith	Jamie Dunphy	Dan Ryan	Elana Pirtle-Guiney	Sameer Kanal	Steve Novick	Tiffany Koyama Lane	Angelita Morillo	Olivia Clark	Mitch Green	Eric Zimmerman
2026	Keith Wilson	Jamie Dunphy	Candace Avalos	Loretta Smith	Jamie Dunphy	Dan Ryan	Elana Pirtle-Guiney	Sameer Kanal	Steve Novick	Tiffany Koyama Lane	Angelita Morillo	Olivia Clark	Mitch Green	Eric Zimmerman
