= 2024 Portland, Oregon, municipal elections =

The 2024 Portland municipal elections were held on November 5, 2024, to elect the mayor, city auditor and city council of Portland, Oregon. This was the first Portland election to use ranked-choice voting (instant-runoff voting for the mayor's position; single transferable voting for city councillors) following the implementation of charter reform approved by voters in a 2022 ballot measure.

Businessman Keith Wilson was elected mayor, defeating 3 incumbent city commissioners who also ran for the position. Commissioner Dan Ryan was the sole incumbent to be elected to the new city council, although former commissioner Steve Novick also won a seat. The remaining ten council seats were won by members who had not previously held office in Portland, including Elana Pirtle-Guiney and Tiffany Koyama Lane, who were elected council president and vice president respectively in January 2025. Incumbent auditor Simone Rede was re-elected unopposed.

Municipal elections in Portland are officially nonpartisan, meaning that party affiliations are not listed on the ballot.

== Mayor ==
=== Candidates ===
- Saadiq Ali
- Shei'Meka As-Salaam, educator
- James Atkinson IV, inventor
- Durrell Kinsey Bey, youth leadership program worker
- Rene Gonzalez, city commissioner
- Michael Hayes, retired
- Yao Jun He
- Josh Leake, loan officer and small business owner
- James Macdonald
- Mingus Mapps, city commissioner
- Sharon Nasset, service worker
- Michael Necula, bartender
- Alexander Landry Neely, winemaker and small business owner
- Michael O'Callaghan, activist
- Liv Osthus, stripper and author
- Carmen Rubio, city commissioner
- Martin Ward
- Keith Wilson, CEO of Titan Freight Systems
- Dustin Witherspoon, maintenance supervisor
- James Zehren, attorney and writer (write-in)

=== Results ===
2024 Portland mayoral election
Candidate	Maximum round	Maximum votes	Share in maximum round	Maximum votes First round votesTransfer votes
Keith Wilson	19	149,959	59.25%	
Carmen Rubio	19	103,157	40.75%	
Rene Gonzalez	18	68,539	24.27%	
Mingus Mapps	17	44,184	15.09%	
Liv (Viva) Østhus	16	22,879	7.71%	
Durrell Kinsey Bey	15	3,550	1.19%	
Josh Leake	14	3,227	1.08%	
Sharon Nasset	13	2,972	0.99%	
Michael O'Callaghan	12	2,740	0.92%	
Martin Ward	11	2,314	0.77%	
Alexander Landry Neely	10	2,148	0.72%	
Michael Hayes	9	1,982	0.66%	
Shei'Meka (BeUtee) As-Salaam	8	1,448	0.48%	
James McDonald	7	1,252	0.42%	
Dustin Witherspoon	6	980	0.33%	
Saadiq Ali	5	930	0.31%	
Yao Jun He	4	809	0.27%	
James Atkinson IV	3	555	0.18%	
Write In	2	480	0.16%	
Michael Necula	1	309	0.10%	

== City auditor ==
The city auditor was elected to a two-year term in 2024, while the office will be up for election for a four-year term in 2026. Incumbent auditor Simone Rede ran for a second term and was re-elected unopposed.

== City council ==
Due to a ballot measure passed by voters in 2022, which reformed the city charter, the 2024 election was the first under the new mayor–council system of government. The former 5-seat city commission, with members elected at-large, was replaced by a new city council with 12 seats elected from 4 geographic districts. City council members were elected using single transferable vote, with 3 winning candidates per district. All seats were up for election, with six members running for four-year terms and the other six running for two-year terms, which will be eligible to run for a full term in 2026.

All incumbent members of the Commission were eligible to run for re-election to the new City Council. Incumbent Dan Ryan was the only member to do so, winning a seat in district 2. Former commissioner Steve Novick, who previously served a term from 2013 to 2017, was elected to the new city council representing district 3. Two races remained too close to call for more than 2 weeks after the election. The final 12-member council included six men and six women, five people of color, and four members who identify as LGBTQ.

At the new council's inaugural meeting in January 2025, Elana Pirtle-Guiney was elected council president, while Tiffany Koyama Lane was elected vice president.
