= 2024 Portland, Oregon, mayoral election =

2024 Portland, Oregon mayoral election
- November 5, 2024
- Turnout: 55.56%
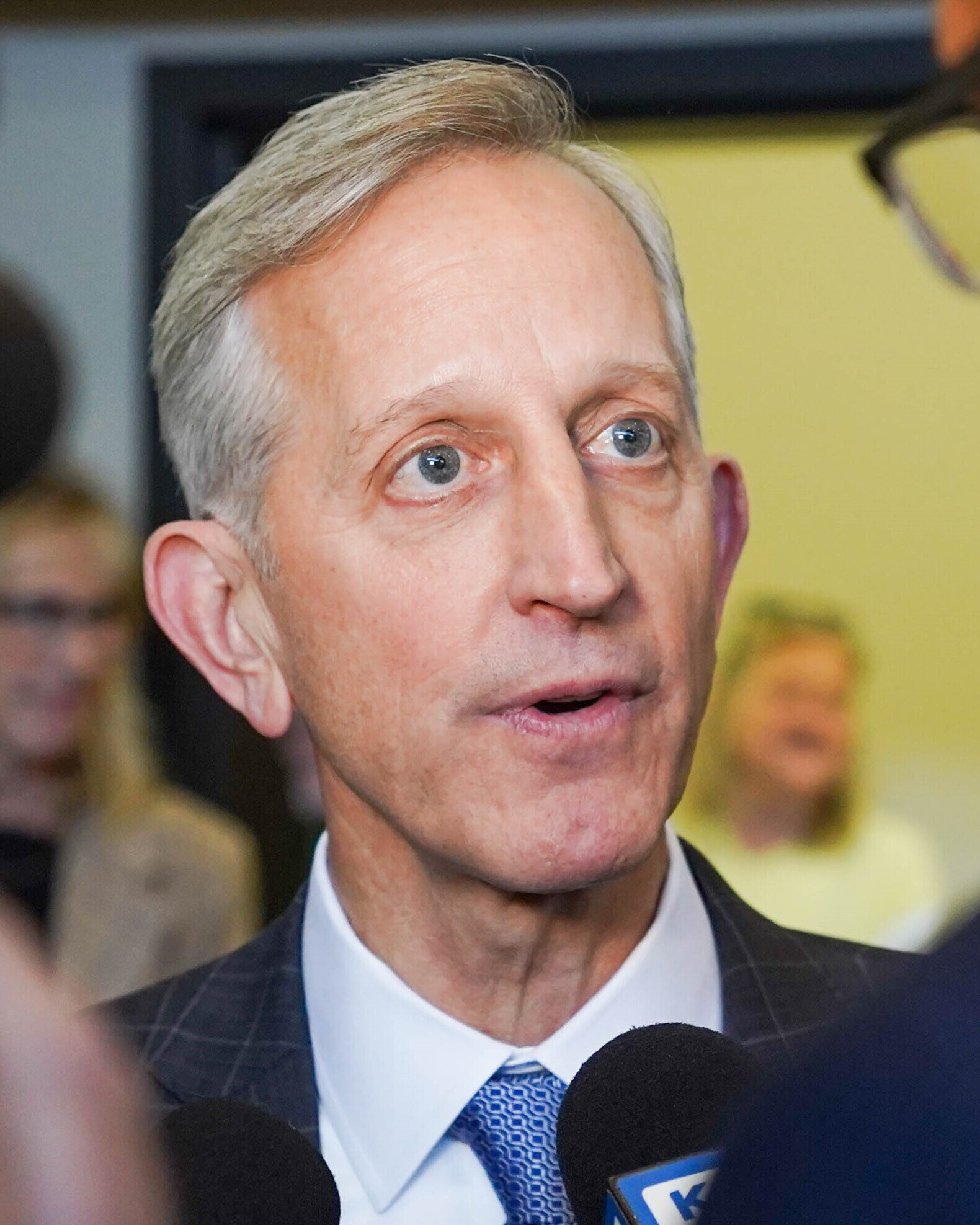

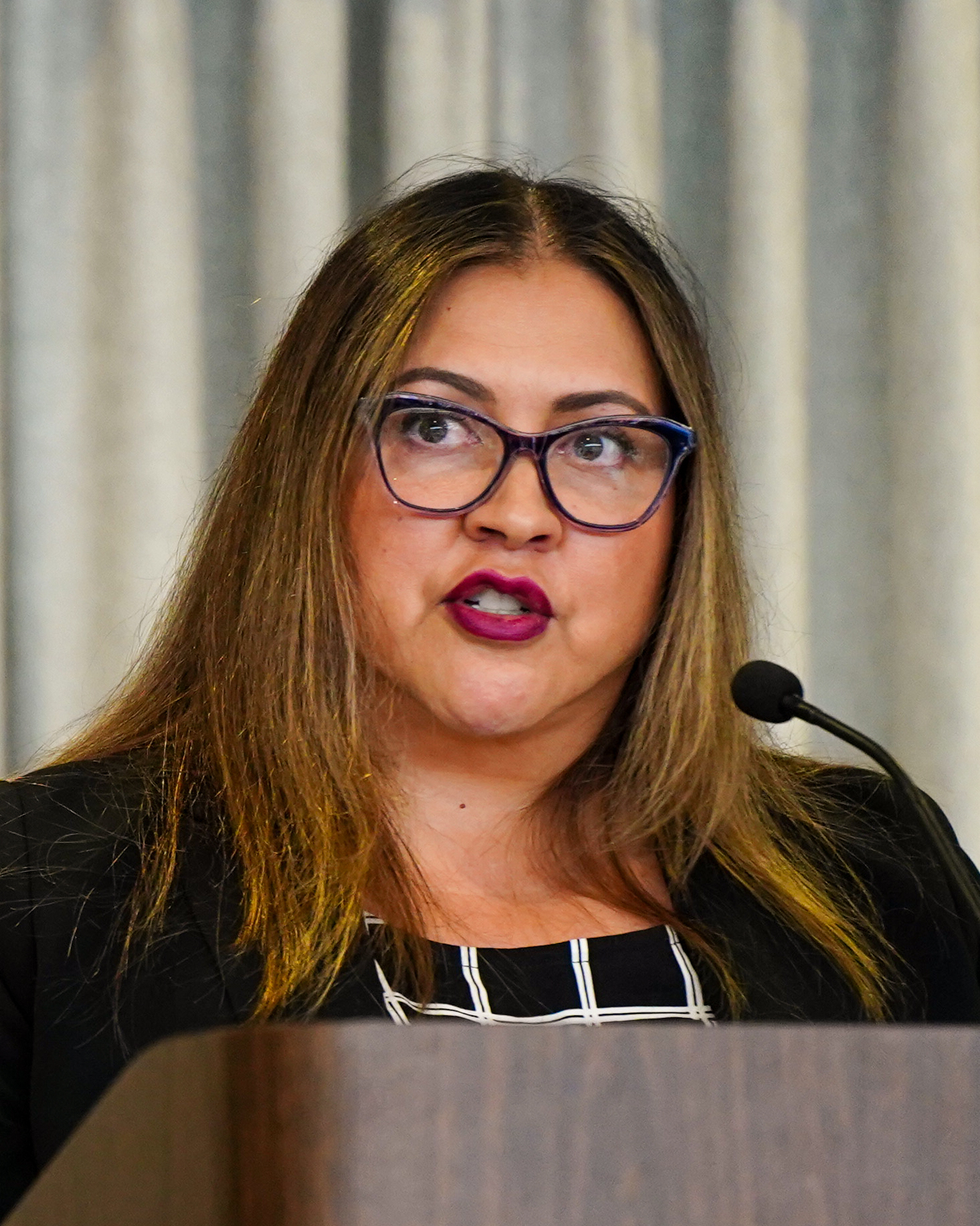

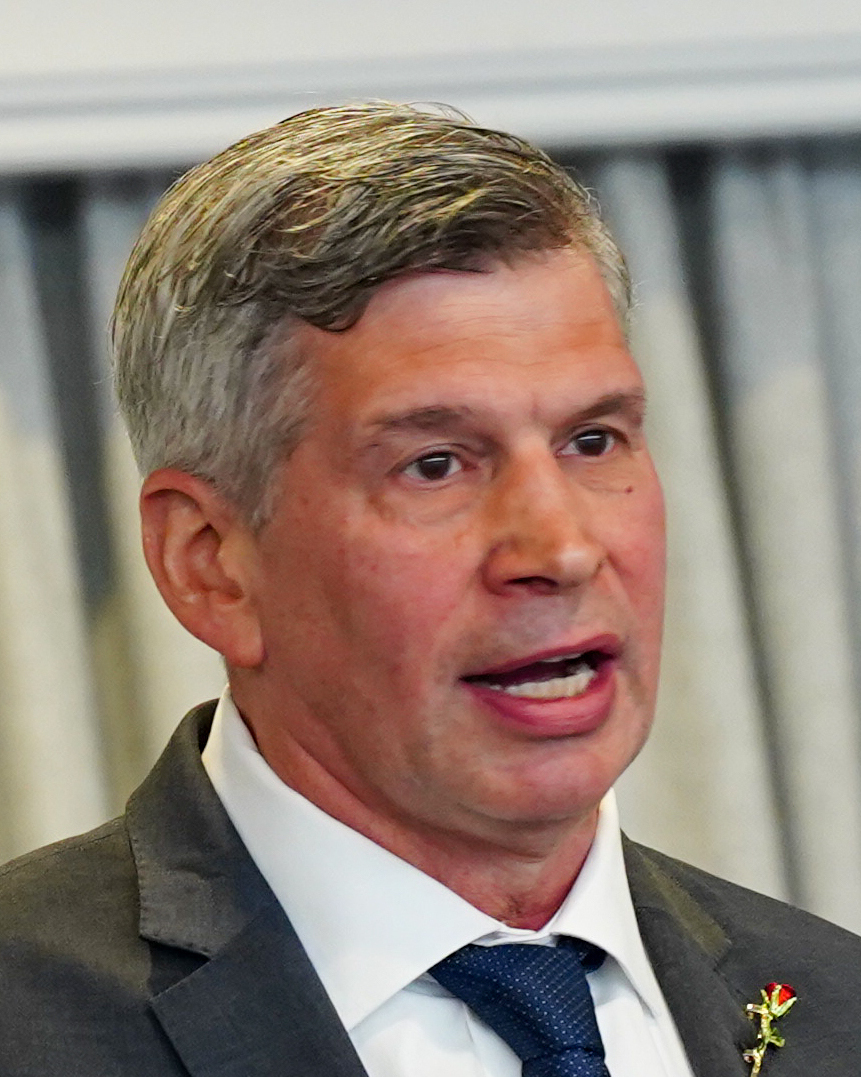

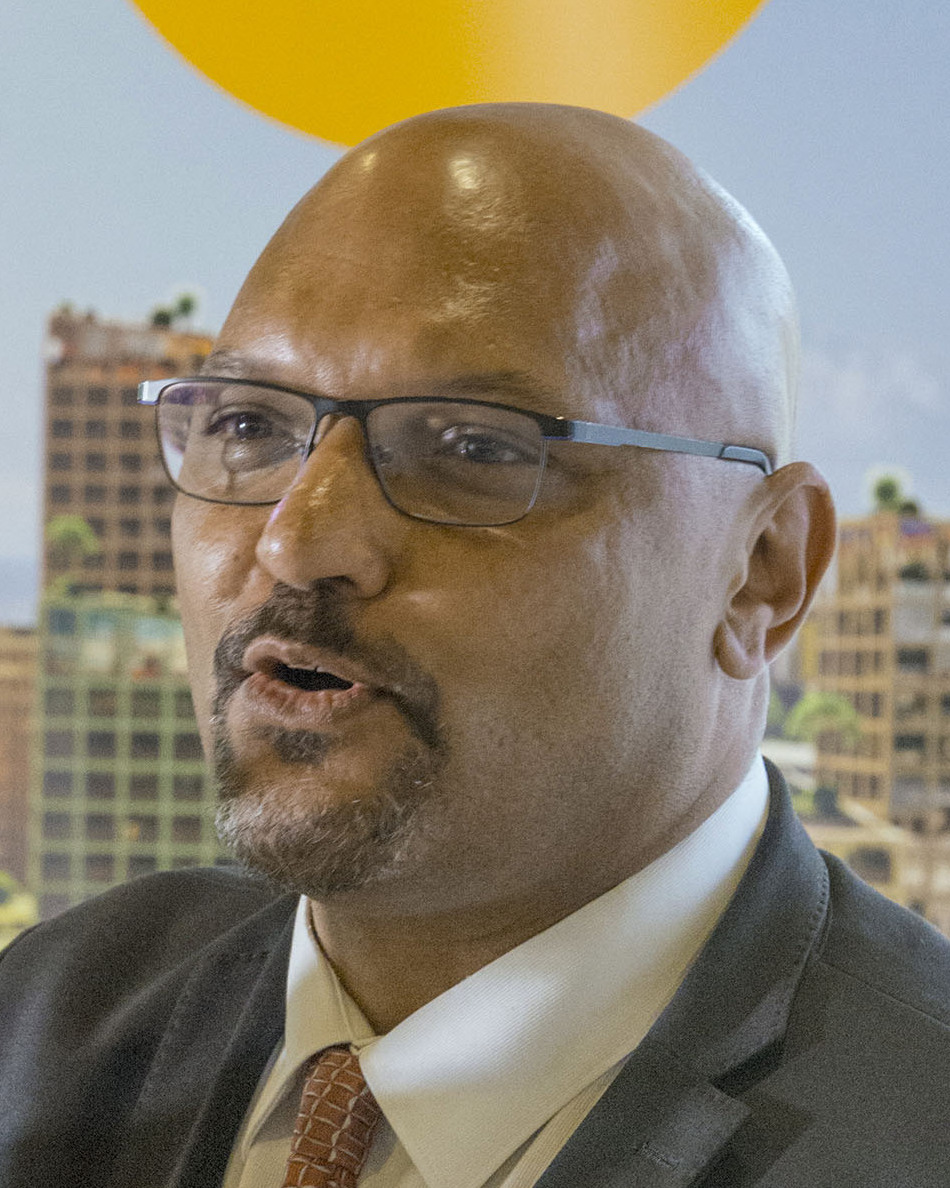

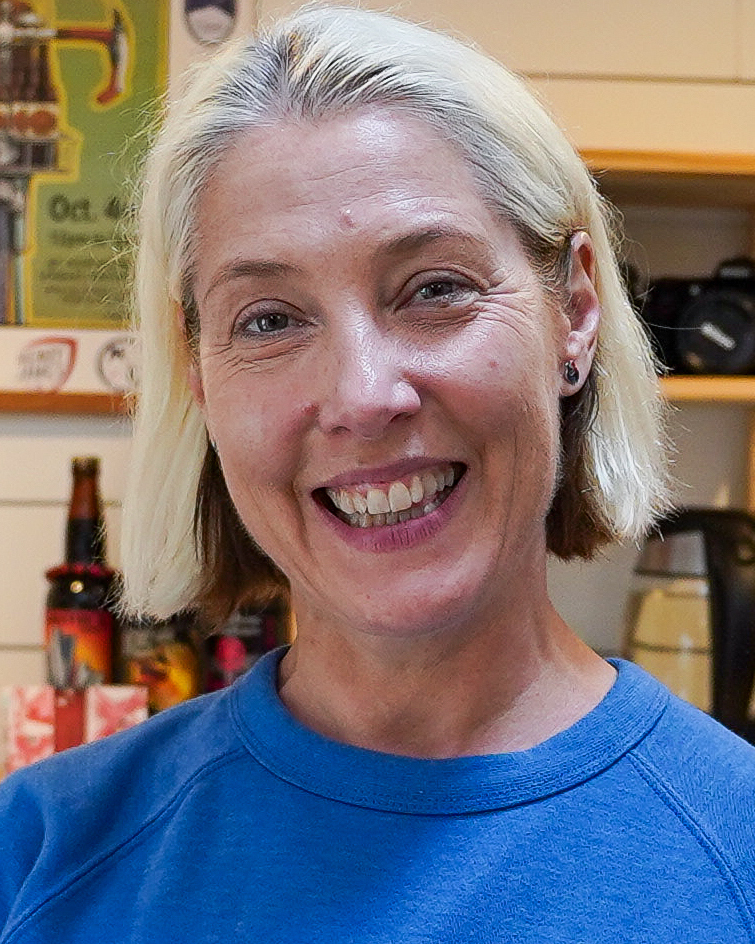
Candidate	Keith Wilson	Carmen Rubio	Rene Gonzalez
First round	101,935; 33.74%	67,125; 22.22%	53,013; 17.88%
Final round	149,959; 59.25%	103,157; 40.75%	Eliminated
Candidate	Mingus Mapps	Liv Osthus
First round	38,823; 12.84%	20,188; 6.5%
Final round	Eliminated	Eliminated
Mayor before election
Ted Wheeler
Democratic
Elected mayor
Keith Wilson
Democratic

The 2024 Portland mayoral election was held on November 5, 2024, to elect the mayor of Portland, Oregon. Businessman Keith Wilson was elected, defeating three city council members and 15 other candidates.

This was the first Portland mayoral election to use ranked-choice voting (Instant-runoff voting) after it was instituted by the passage of a 2022 ballot measure. Municipal elections in Portland are officially nonpartisan, meaning that party affiliations are not listed on the ballot.

== Background ==
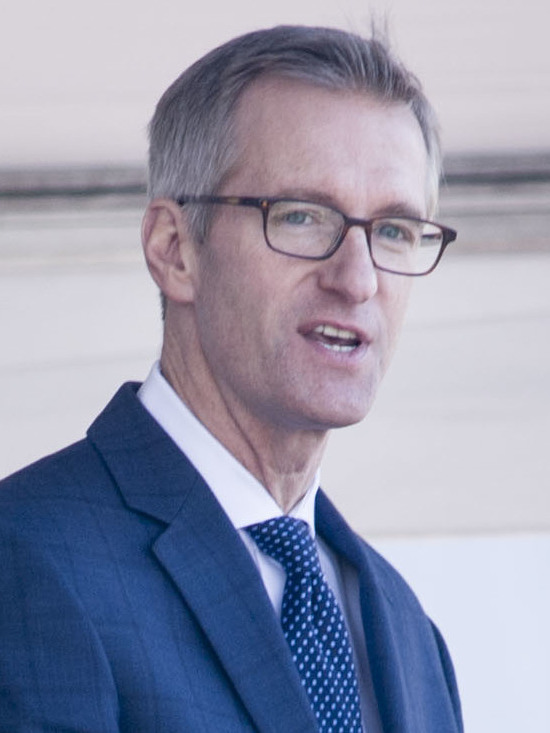
Ted Wheeler, the incumbent mayor, whose term expired on January 1, 2025

On June 12, 2023, Durrell Kinsey Bey became the first candidate to announce his run for mayor. He was followed by City Commissioner Mingus Mapps on July 3, 2023.

On September 13, 2023, incumbent Democratic mayor Ted Wheeler announced that he would not be seeking a third term. In December and January respectively, City Commissioners Rene Gonzalez and Carmen Rubio announced their candidacies as well.

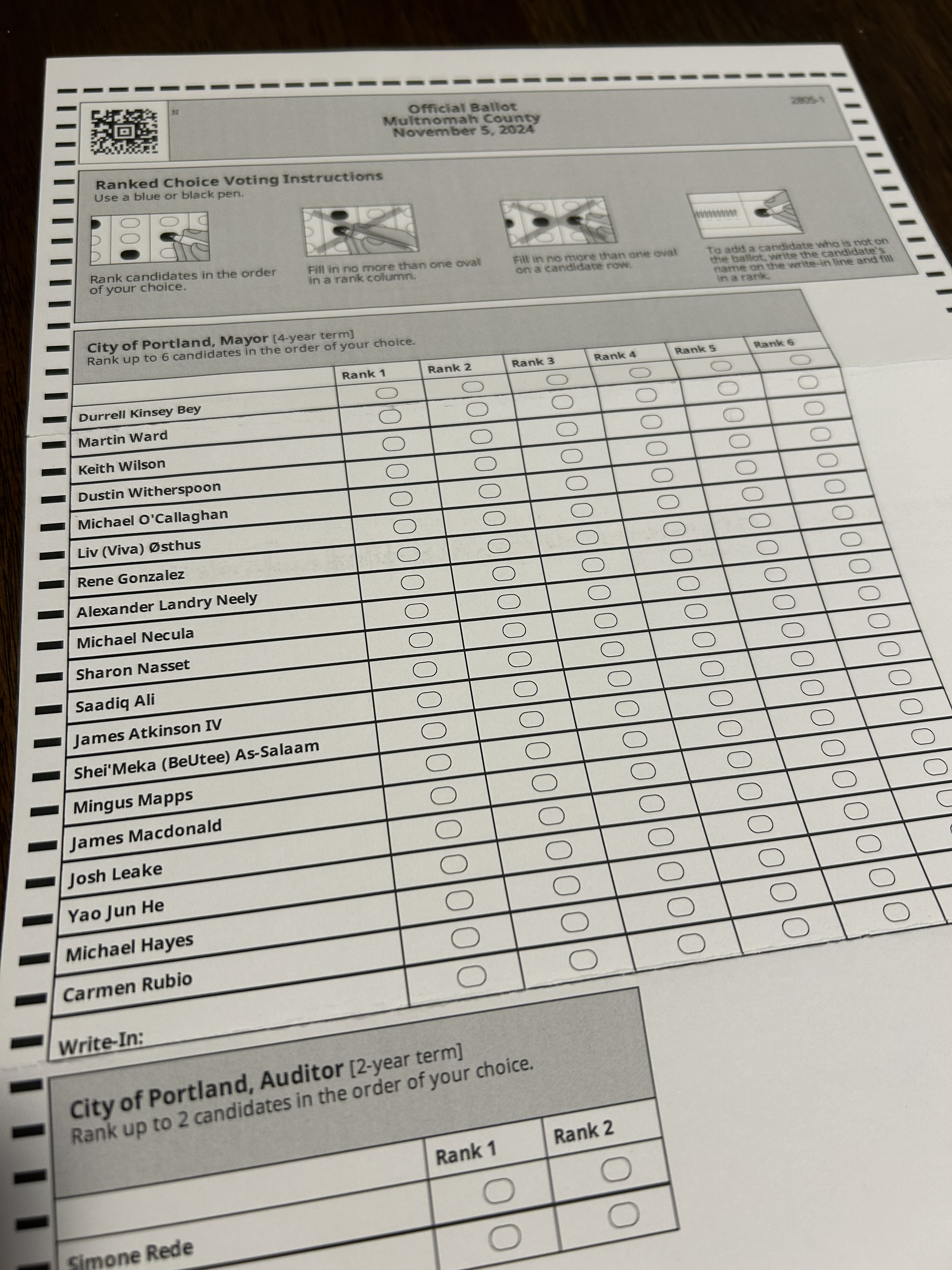
This is the first Portland election to use ranked-choice voting.

Homelessness and public safety were considered the two most important issues of this election. This election, as well as the City Council election, was a major indication of political shifts in Portland. The previous city council elections saw a shift away from progressives towards slightly more moderate elected officials.

== Candidates ==
=== Declared ===
- Saadiq Ali
- Shei'Meka As-Salaam, educator
- James Atkinson IV, inventor
- Durrell Kinsey Bey, youth leadership program worker
- Rene Gonzalez, city commissioner
- Michael Hayes, retired
- Yao Jun He
- Josh Leake, loan officer and small business owner
- James Macdonald
- Mingus Mapps, city commissioner
- Sharon Nasset, service worker
- Michael Necula, bartender
- Alexander Landry Neely, winemaker and small business owner
- Michael O'Callaghan, activist
- Liv Osthus, stripper and author
- Carmen Rubio, city commissioner
- Martin Ward
- Keith Wilson, CEO of Titan Freight Systems
- Dustin Witherspoon, maintenance supervisor
- James Zehren, attorney and writer (write-in)

=== Withdrew ===
- Marshall Runkel, political strategist

=== Declined ===
- Sam Adams, former mayor (ran for Multnomah County Commission)
- Vadim Mozyrsky, administrative law judge and candidate for City Commission in 2022 (ran for Multnomah County Commission)
- Dan Ryan, city commissioner (ran for City Council)
- Ted Wheeler, incumbent mayor

== Endorsements ==
Carmen Rubio

Statewide officials

- Kate Brown, former governor of Oregon (2015–2023)
- Tina Kotek, governor of Oregon (2023–present)

Local officials

- Jesse Beason, Multnomah County commissioner (2023–present)
- Susheela Jayapal, former Multnomah County commissioner (2019–2023)
- Lynn Peterson, president of Metro

Individuals

- Marshall Runkel, 2024 candidate for mayor of Portland

Labor unions

- AFSCME Local 189
- NW Oregon Labor Council, AFL–CIO
- Portland Association of Teachers
- SEIU Local 49
- UFCW Local 555

Political parties

- Working Families Party

Newspapers

- Portland Mercury (Note: The Mercury issued a ranked endorsement of Rubio, Wilson, and Osthus, in that order.)
Rene Gonzalez

U.S. representatives

- Kurt Schrader, former Oregon's 5th congressional district (2009–2023)

Local officials

- Kevin Barton, Washington County district attorney
- Nathan Vasquez, Multnomah County district attorney elect
- John Wentworth, Clackamas County district attorney

Labor unions

- Columbia Pacific Building and Construction Trades Council
- International Brotherhood of Electrical Workers Local 48
- International Union of Operating Engineers Local 701
- Multnomah County Deputy Sheriffs Association
- Portland Fire Fighters' Association
- Portland Police Association

Newspapers

- The Oregonian
Keith Wilson

Local officials

- Joe Buck, Lake Oswego mayor
- Steve Callaway, Hillsboro mayor
- Ashton Simpson, Metro councilor

Labor unions

- SEIU Local 49
- UFCW Local 555

Newspapers

- Willamette Week

== Polling ==
Poll source	Date(s) administered	Sample size (Note: Key: A – all adults RV – registered voters LV – likely voters V – unclear)	Margin of error	Mingus Mapps	Rene Gonzalez	Carmen Rubio	Keith Wilson	Liz Osthus	Write In	Undecided/don't know
DHM Research	October 9–13, 2024	300 (A)	± 5.7%	10%	23%	11%	18%	4%	1%	32%
Lake Research Partners	August 7–11, 2024	500 (LV)	± 4.4%	13%	21%	13%	4%	3%	–	39%

== Debates ==
No.	Date	Host	Location	Moderators	Participants	Link
1	April 25, 2024	National Association of Minority Contractors; KOIN 6 Portland	Hilton Double Tree Lloyd Center	Ken Boddie	Mingus Mapps; Carmen Rubio; Keith Wilson	
2	September 12, 2024	Portland Metro Chamber; KOIN 6 Portland	Hilton Portland Hotel	Ken Boddie	Rene Gonzalez; Carmen Rubio; Keith Wilson	YouTube
3	October 8, 2024	City Club of Portland	First Congregational Church	Jeff Mapes	Rene Gonzalez; Mingus Mapps; Liv Osthus; Carmen Rubio; Keith Wilson	YouTube
4	October 15, 2024	KGW; The Oregonian		David Molko Shane Dixon Kavanaugh	Rene Gonzalez Mingus Mapps; Liv Osthus; Carmen Rubio; Keith Wilson	YouTube
5	October 20, 2024	Oregon Public Broadcasting		Dave Miller	Rene Gonzalez Mingus Mapps; Carmen Rubio; Keith Wilson	

== Results ==
2024 Portland mayoral election
Candidate	Maximum round	Maximum votes	Share in maximum round	Maximum votes First round votesTransfer votes
Keith Wilson	20	153,522	59.06%	
Carmen Rubio	20	106,431	40.94%	
Rene Gonzalez	19	70,163	24.21%	
Mingus Mapps	18	45,156	15.03%	
Liv (Viva) Østhus	17	23,584	7.75%	
Durrell Kinsey Bey	16	3,681	1.21%	
Josh Leake	15	3,292	1.08%	
Sharon Nasset	14	3,046	0.99%	
Michael O'Callaghan	13	2,823	0.92%	
Martin Ward	12	2,376	0.77%	
Alexander Landry Neely	11	2,195	0.71%	
Michael Hayes	10	2,014	0.65%	
Shei'Meka (BeUtee) As-Salaam	9	1,527	0.49%	
James Macdonald	8	1,280	0.41%	
Dustin Witherspoon	7	998	0.32%	
Saadiq Ali	6	962	0.31%	
Yao Jun He	5	832	0.27%	
Write In	4	634	0.20%	
James Atkinson IV	3	580	0.19%	
Michael Necula	2	324	0.10%	
James A. Zehren (certified write-in)	1	0	0.00%	

== See also ==
- 2024 Portland, Oregon municipal elections
- 2024 Portland, Oregon City Council election
