= Viva Las Vegas (disambiguation) =

Viva Las Vegas is a 1964 film starring Elvis Presley and Ann-Margret.

Viva Las Vegas may also refer to:

- "Viva Las Vegas" (song), song performed by Elvis Presley in the film
- Viva Las Vegas (EP), an EP by Elvis Presley, containing songs from the film
- Die Hard Trilogy 2: Viva Las Vegas, an American video game released in 2000
- Viva! Las Vegas, a Japanese video game of the late 1980s, also known as Vegas Dream
- Viva Las Vegas (dancer), stage name of American entertainer Liv Osthus
- "Viva Las Vegas", a fifth-season episode of the American television series CSI: Crime Scene Investigation
- "Viva Las Vegas", a second-season episode of the American television series Roswell

== See also ==
- Viva La Vega, video of Norwegian band Kaizers Orchestra
