= List of University of Portland alumni =

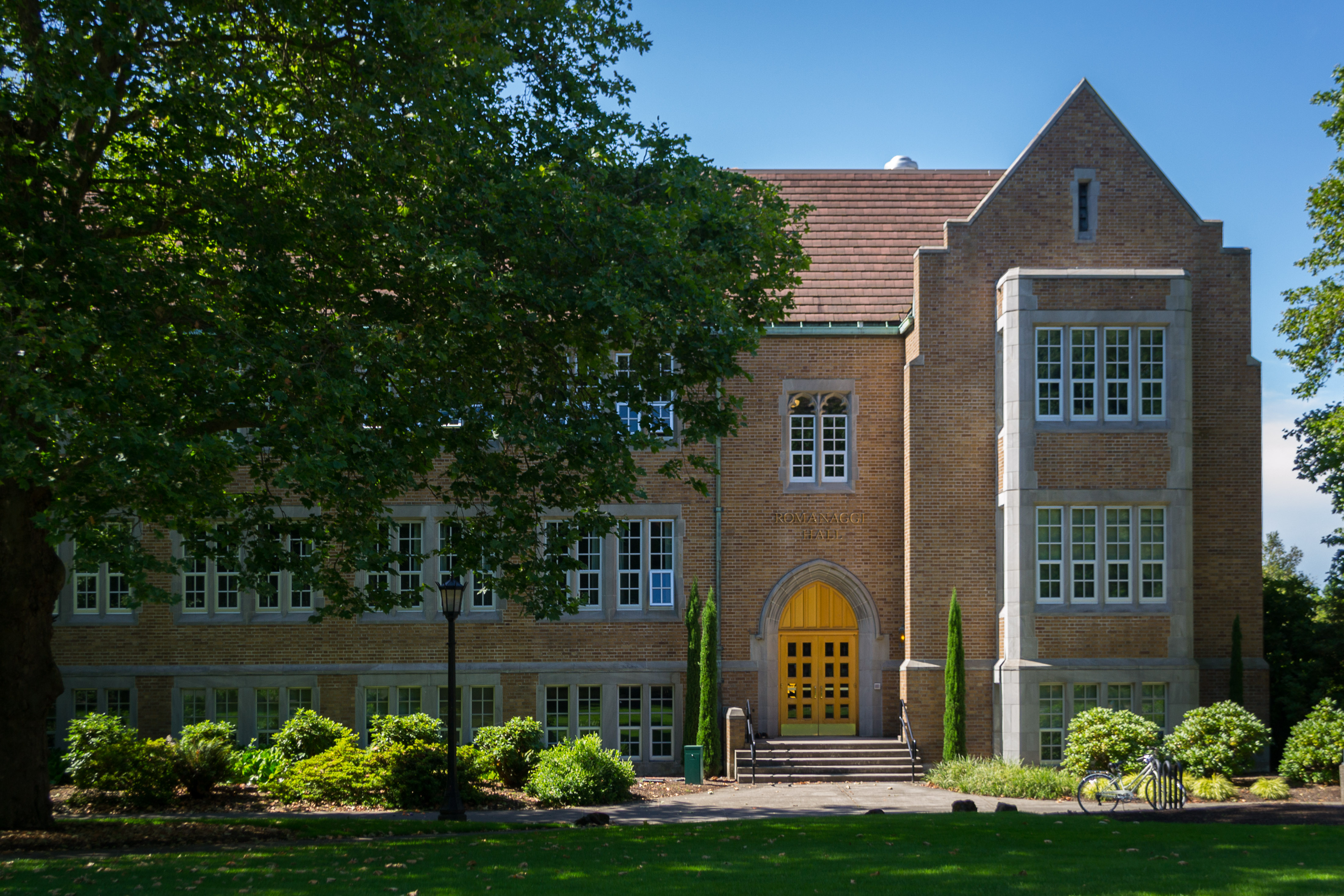
Romanaggi Hall on University of Portland campus

This is a list of notable University of Portland alumni. The University of Portland is a private, Roman Catholic university located in north Portland, Oregon, along the east bank of the Willamette River. Founded in 1901 by the Congregation of Holy Cross, its sister school is the University of Notre Dame. As of 2018, the University of Portland counts approximately 13,000 alumni in the Portland metropolitan area alone.

== Academia ==
- Jules Boykoff, professor of politics at Pacific University
- Robert E. Glennen, 13th president of Emporia State University
- John Henry Merryman, Nelson Bowman Sweitzer and Marie B. Sweitzer Professor of Law at Stanford Law School
- Michael Merzenich, neuroscientist and professor at the University of California, San Francisco

== Art and literature ==
- Jean M. Auel, author

== Civil society ==
- Walter "Walt" Dawson, national spokesperson for the Alzheimer's Association
- Edward Kelly, bishop of Boise
- Mel White, clergyman and writer on LGBT Christian issues

== Entertainment ==
=== Film, television, and performing arts ===
- Malika Andrews, journalist for ESPN
- Kunal Nayyar, actor, CBS's The Big Bang Theory
- Chris Siegfried, reality TV star, season 9 winner of ABC's The Bachelorette
- Paul Winfield, actor

=== Social media ===
- Tori Dunlap, founder of Her First $100K, TikTok star
- Noah Beck, social media personality, TikTok star

== Government and politics ==
=== United States congress ===
==== U.S. representatives ====
- Larry LaRocco, former U.S. representative

=== Judges ===
- Edward Leavy, judge for the United States Court of Appeals for the Ninth Circuit
- George Van Hoomissen, former justice on the Oregon Supreme Court
- Oldiais Ngiraikelau, chief justice of Palau

=== Other U.S. political figures ===
- Ed Murray, former mayor of Seattle 2014-17
- Nadine Woodward, journalist and mayor of Spokane, Washington 2019-
- Joseph Ada, former governor of Guam

== Science and technology ==
- Chris Lattner, primary author of LLVM software compiler architecture and the Swift programming language
- Muriel Lezak, neuropsychologist
- Donald Shiley, co-inventor of the artificial heart valve

== Sports ==
- Yari Allnutt, U.S. men's international soccer player
- Chris Brown, soccer player for the Portland Timbers
- Conor Casey, U.S. men's international soccer player
- Pat Casey, former head coach of the Oregon State baseball team
- Steve Cherundolo, U.S. men's international soccer player
- Darwin Cook, former NBA player
- Michelle Cruz, professional soccer player for Apollon Limassol and Seattle Reign FC
- Ken Dayley, former Major League Baseball pitcher, played in both the 1985 and 1987 World Series
- Danielle Foxhoven, NWSL forward for the Portland Thorns FC and Seattle Reign FC
- Amanda Frisbie, NWSL forward and defender for Seattle Reign FC
- Rocky Gale, Major League Baseball catcher, San Diego Padres
- Tyler Glasnow, Major League Baseball pitcher, Tampa Bay Rays
- Alfredo Razon Gonzalez, Philippine Men's international soccer player
- Kelly Gray, international soccer player
- Pinhas Hozez (born 1957), Israeli basketball player, Israeli Basketball Premier League
- Eric Hull, former Major League Baseball pitcher
- Cooper Hummel, Major League Baseball outfielder, Seattle Mariners
- Nate Jaqua, international soccer player
- Kasey Keller, U.S. men's international soccer player
- Woody Kincaid, U.S. long distance runner, North American record holder in the indoor 5000
- Bill Krueger, former Major League Baseball pitcher
- Tom Lampkin, former Major League Baseball catcher
- Shannon MacMillan, U.S. women's international soccer player, Olympic gold medalist, 1996 Olympics
- Benji Michel, Professional Soccer Player with Arouca of the Primeira Liga in Portugal, and US Men's U23 National Team
- Tiffeny Milbrett, U.S. women's international soccer player, Olympic gold medalist, 1996 Olympics
- Heath Pearce, international soccer player
- Cincy Powell, former NBA basketball player
- Adam Quick, international basketball player
- Megan Rapinoe, U.S. women's international soccer player
- Rachael Rapinoe, former University of Portland soccer player, twin sister of USWNT player Megan Rapinoe
- Elli Reed, NWSL defender for the Seattle Reign FC
- Luis Robles, MLS goalkeeper for the New York Red Bulls
- Alejandro Salazar, international soccer player
- Sophie Schmidt, Canadian internationalsoccer player
- Ray Scott, former NBA basketball player
- Christine Sinclair, Canadian international soccer player
- Jose Slaughter, former NBA player
- Robin Smeulders, international basketball player
- Garrett Smith, former head coach of the women's soccer team (2005 National Champions)
- Erik Spoelstra, Miami Heat head coach
- Jim Sweeney, former college football head coach
- Tomomi "Jumbo" Tsuruta, Japanese former pro wrestler; former training instructor
- Keelin Winters, NWSL midfielder for the Seattle Reign FC

== Miscellaneous ==
- Santiago Ventura Morales, social worker falsely convicted of murder, awarded full scholarship while in prison
- Richard VanGrunsven, founder of Aircraft Kit Industry Association, inducted into the Oregon Aviation Hall of Fame
