= Rene Gonzalez (politician) =

American politician

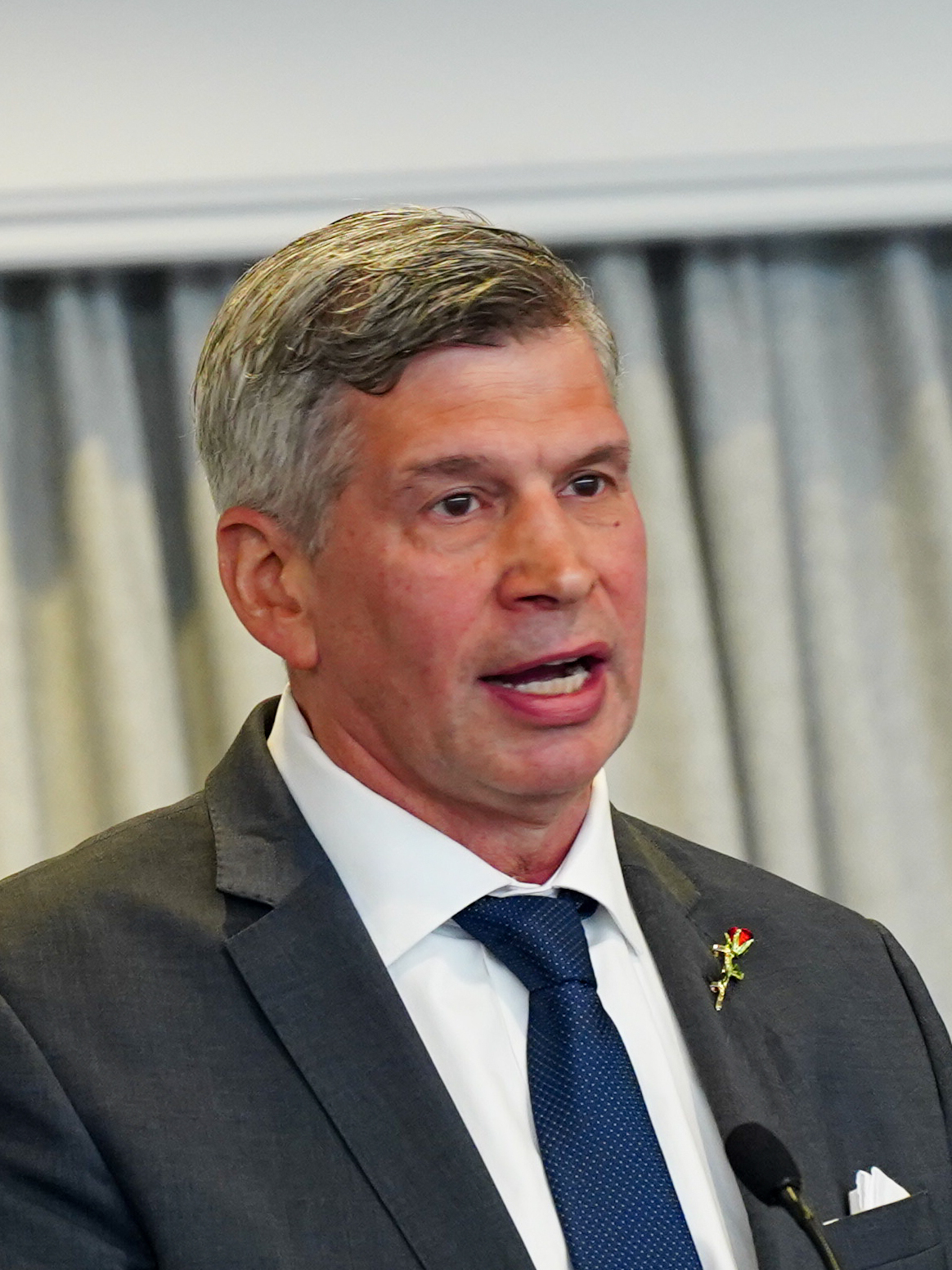
- Gonzalez in 2024

Portland City Commissioner
- In office January 1, 2023 – December 31, 2024
- Preceded by: Jo Ann Hardesty
- Succeeded by: Office abolished

Personal details
- Party: Democratic
- Children: 3
- Education: Willamette University (BA, JD)
- Occupation: Attorney, entrepreneur
- Website: Official website Campaign website

Rene Gonzalez is an American businessman, former politician, and a lawyer. He held a seat on the Portland, Oregon City Council from January 2023 to December 2024. He challenged incumbent commissioner Jo Ann Hardesty in the 2022 election, running on a platform that emphasized law and order and livability.

During 2024, Gonzalez faced a controversy over spending of public funds to redress his Wikipedia page. In October 2024, the city auditor's office found that the spending had violated campaign finance law, a decision that was later overturned.

In the November 2024 elections, Gonzalez was a candidate for the position of Mayor of Portland. During the campaign, the first under Portland's newly instituted ranked-choice voting system, Gonzalez was the subject of an effort to convince voters not to rank him regardless of the voter's other preferred candidates. Gonzalez earned 20% of first ranked choices but ultimately finished the election in third place behind winner Keith Wilson and Carmen Rubio.

== Early life and career ==
Gonzalez was raised in Anchorage, Alaska, where his father worked as a trial judge and federal prosecutor. In 1993, Gonzalez moved to Salem, Oregon, to attend Willamette University, where he was president of the Beta Theta Pi fraternity and played varsity soccer. After obtaining a bachelor's degree, he continued at the Willamette University College of Law where he obtained a Juris Doctor.

Gonzalez then worked as an attorney at Stoel Rives, a regional law firm. He moved to KinderCare Learning Centers in 2005, where he served in legal advising and corporate strategy roles. In 2012 Gonzalez founded Eastbank, a legal services company. In 2019 he purchased Artifex, a technology consulting company that primarily sells Microsoft software services, merging it to create Eastbank Artifex.

In October 2020, Gonzalez founded ED300, a political action committee to support school board candidates that were focused on reopening public schools in the wake of the COVID-19 pandemic. Teachers and many parents objected to returning to school before a vaccine had even been created. Six months after the vaccines were available, ED300 objected to the evidence-based, Oregon Health Authority requirement that schoolteachers be vaccinated. Many parents also objected to ED300 for endorsing predominantly conservative candidates, including anti-LGBTQ and anti-abortion groups and those who wished to limit the teaching of Critical Race Theory or LGBTQ+ topics in Oregon public schools. Many of these candidates objected to comprehensive sex education or the implementation of Oregon's Menstrual Equity law. When questioned, Gonzalez indicated that he was "ecstatic" with the candidates.

After losing mayoral race, Gonzalez joined a local company called Jubitz as a general counsel. Gonzalez is a step-grandson of Jubitz's founder.

== Portland City Council ==
=== Council race ===
Gonzalez ran for the Portland City Commissioner seat in 2022 against incumbent Hardesty. He won the race with 52.6% of the vote and took office in January 2023.

Gonzalez ran a campaign largely focused on combating homelessness and crime and investing in the revitalization of downtown Portland. In particular, he and Hardesty advocated for different approaches to policing and homelessness. Gonzalez was endorsed by the editorial boards of The Oregonian, Willamette Week, and the Portland Tribune, as well as by the Portland Police Association, the Portland Firefighters Union, and the Portland Chamber of Commerce. During the race, his campaign was fined by the city's elections program for allegedly accepting discounted office space, but the fine was later overturned in court for lacking proof that the rent was actually below market rate.

Though both candidates were registered Democrats, during the campaign Hardesty attacked Gonzalez for positions she claimed were right-leaning and for his alleged ties to Republican political consultants and conservative school board candidates.

=== Council term ===
Gonzalez's two-year term as a Portland City Council member began on January 1, 2023. The transition was headed by Tom Miller, who had been a chief of staff for former mayor Sam Adams. Gonzalez was assigned management of Portland Fire & Rescue and other emergency services, excluding the police department. In 2024, Mayor Ted Wheeler appointed Gonzalez as Portland City Council's representative on the Steering Committee Overseeing the Joint Office of Homeless Services. Gonzalez first proposed an amendment to Mayor Wheeler's camping ban that included up to a year in jail for rule-breakers, before transitioning to a proposal that removed the suggested criminal penalty for violating the camping ban but still included large fines. The amendment failed and the criminal penalty was imposed. In January 2024, Gonzalez announced the creation of a new drug overdose treatment response team pilot program to help address the city's drug crisis.

== Personal life ==
Gonzalez and his wife Angie, whom he met in college, have three children and live in the Eastmoreland neighborhood of Portland. Gonzalez identifies as half-Latino, as his father is Mexican-American and his mother is white.

Gonzalez founded United PDX, a youth soccer club in the city of Portland.

In September 2024, Willamette Week reported that Gonzalez received seven speeding tickets between 1998 and 2013, which resulted in his driver's license being suspended twice.

== Controversies ==
In February 2023, Gonzalez ordered Portland Street Response (PSR) and the fire bureau to stop distributing tents to the homeless and instead encouraged them to seek out shelters. Portland Street Response personnel complained they were never consulted about budget and policy decisions. Gonzalez described PSR as being "police abolitionists" on a political mission and described the tent ban as a success.

In January 2024, an unoccupied Honda Accord belonging to Gonzalez's family was lit on fire in front of the family's home. No one was injured in the incident, but the Multnomah County DA Mike Schmidt believes it to be politically motivated.

In February 2024, Gonzalez moved to significantly cut funding for the Portland Street Response program. After criticism, Gonzalez agreed to move the program out of his portfolio in the following month.

Gonzalez announced in a February 2024 social media video that he would no longer use public transit, claiming that a Black woman accosted him while he rode the MAX light rail on his way to work. Released TriMet security footage showed that a fellow passenger walking through the aisle brushed shoulders with him as he sat in an aisle seat.

During a Portland City Council meeting in July 2024, Gonzalez proposed limiting public testimony on police brutality.

In August 2024, The Oregonian reported that Gonzalez spent $6,400 of city taxpayer dollars to hire a contractor, WhiteHatWiki, to make edit requests for his Wikipedia page in an effort to remove references to his 2022 interaction with Patriot Prayer. The requests were submitted to Wikipedia by Gonzalez' policy advisor Harrison Kass, who ran unsuccessfully for Portland City Commissioner for District 3 in 2024. The Portland City Elections Division opened an investigation into the spending after receiving a campaign finance complaint. The auditor's office initially concluded there was "insufficient evidence" to suggest a campaign finance rule violation, however it has later ruled that the Rene for Portland campaign use of $6,400 on Wikipedia editing related matters violated campaign law; an edit involved ensuring his page stated he was a Democrat, which was not necessary for his office, but only for his candidacy. Since one of the eight edits was to solidify his party affiliation, the City Auditor valued the edit at $800 (1/8th of $6400), and assessed a fine of $2,400 against the campaign as a result. The fine was raised because Gonzalez interfered in the investigation and attempted to mislead the Auditor's Office on evidence, with the fine to pay into the city's general funds.

On November 13, 2024, the City of Portland's auditor's office fined Gonzalez an additional $9,180 after determining that Gonzalez failed to expediently refund $3,060 in illegally retained excess campaign funds across at least 17 different occasions, a violation of city campaign finance laws.

In August 2025, a circuit court judge overturned the auditor's findings, ruling that Gonzalez's due process rights were violated.

== See also ==
- Conflict-of-interest editing on Wikipedia
