= Keith Wilson (mayor) =

American businessman and politician (born 1963)

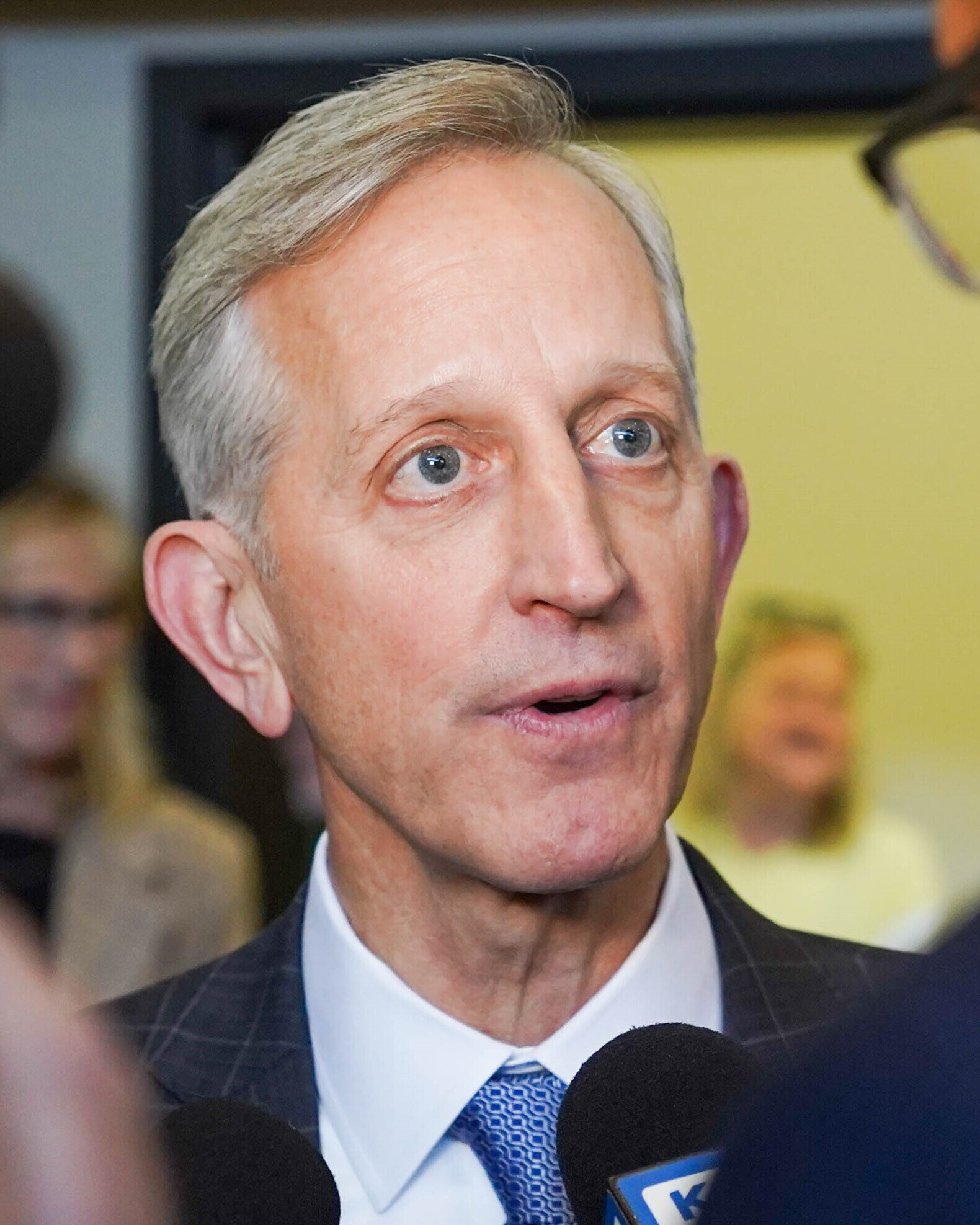
- Wilson in 2024

54th Mayor of Portland
- Incumbent
- Assumed office January 1, 2025
- Preceded by: Ted Wheeler

Personal details
- Born: 1963 (age 62–63) Portland, Oregon, U.S.
- Party: Democratic
- Children: 2
- Education: Portland Community College (attended); Oregon State University (BA); University of Portland (MBA)

Keith Wilson (born 1963) is an American businessman and Democratic politician who is serving as the 54th mayor of Portland, Oregon, since 2025. He is the president and chief executive officer of Titan Freight Systems.

== Early life and career ==
Wilson was born and raised in Portland, Oregon. He grew up in North Portland. Wilson received a Bachelor of Science degree from Oregon State University (OSU) in business administration and management, and later received a Master of Business Administration degree in business administration and marketing from the University of Portland.

After attending PCC and OSU, Wilson moved to New York City to work for NBC in the sales department. He was homeless for a short time, living in LaGuardia Airport. In 1990, he returned to Portland to help his father run the family company. In 1998, Wilson merged his father's two companies into one, Titan Freight Systems. Wilson is also the founder of Shelter Portland, a nonprofit organization seeking to end homelessness.

== Political career ==
Wilson self-funded multiple trips to various cities and countries around the world in order to talk with experts on homelessness. He was a delegate to the 2024 Democratic National Convention and was a member of the Platform Committee.

On June 12, 2024, Wilson announced his intention to run for mayor of Portland in the 2024 election. Part of his campaign promises is to completely end unsheltered homelessness in Portland. On election night, November 5, 2024, Wilson had an early lead. He and city commissioner Carmen Rubio advanced past the first few rounds of tabulation. The next day, most news agencies called the race for Wilson and Rubio conceded.

The Oregonian wrote, "Wilson's pitch to tackle homelessness, crime and livability — top concerns with Portland voters — came with a full-throated insistence they can be remedied with care and compassion. He made the audacious pledge to largely end unsheltered homelessness within a year the crux of his campaign." He has proposed increasing the number of walk-in emergency shelters in existing churches and other community spaces.

== Personal life ==
Wilson is married and has two children.

== See also ==
- List of Oregon State University alumni
- List of University of Portland alumni

Political offices
Preceded by Ted Wheeler	Mayor of Portland; 2025–present	Incumbent
