= Absalom Barrett Hallock =

American architect and politician

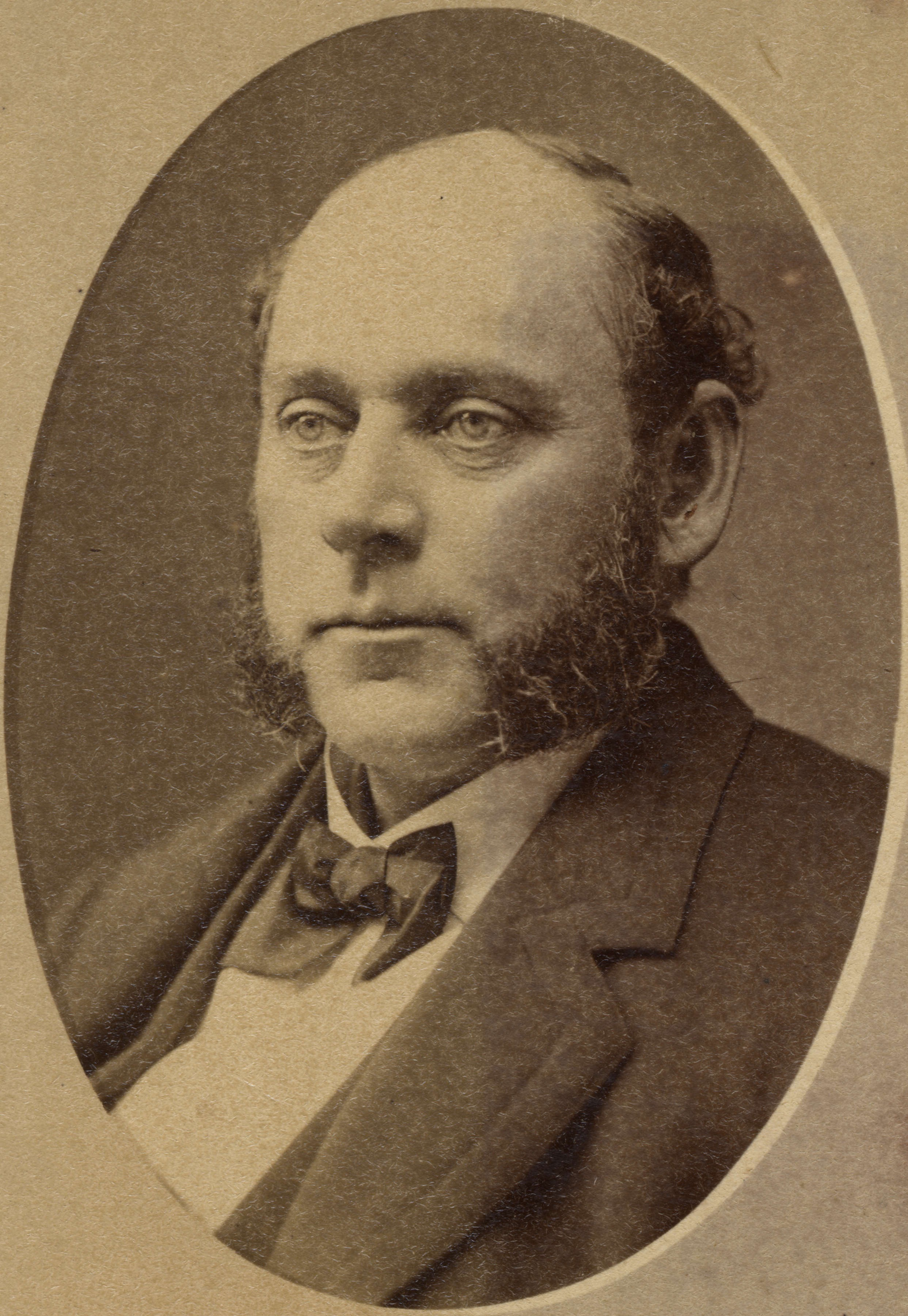
- A. B. Hallock circa 1875

Member of the Portland City Council
- In office 1870–1873
- Preceded by: A. C. Ripley
- Succeeded by: G. W. Hoyt
- In office 1866–1869
- Preceded by: Robert R. Thompson
- Succeeded by: C. Bills
- In office 1859–1863
- Preceded by: G. Collier Robbins
- Succeeded by: Alexander Dodge
- In office 1858–1857
- Preceded by: A. B. Elfeldt
- Succeeded by: C. P. Bacon

Personal details
- Born: August 27, 1822 Utica, New York, United States
- Died: October 28, 1892 (aged 60) Tillamook, Oregon, United States
- Spouse: Mary Tiffany Bliss
- Children: 2
- Occupation: Architect; Politician

Absalom Barrett Hallock was an American architect and politician. He served on the Portland, Oregon City Council multiple times and designed various prominent buildings and houses in the Portland metropolitan area.

== Early life ==
Absalom Barrett Hallock was born on August 27, 1822, in Utica, New York, to Robert Titus Hallock, a doctor, and Amelia Adams Barrett.

== Career ==
=== Architecture ===
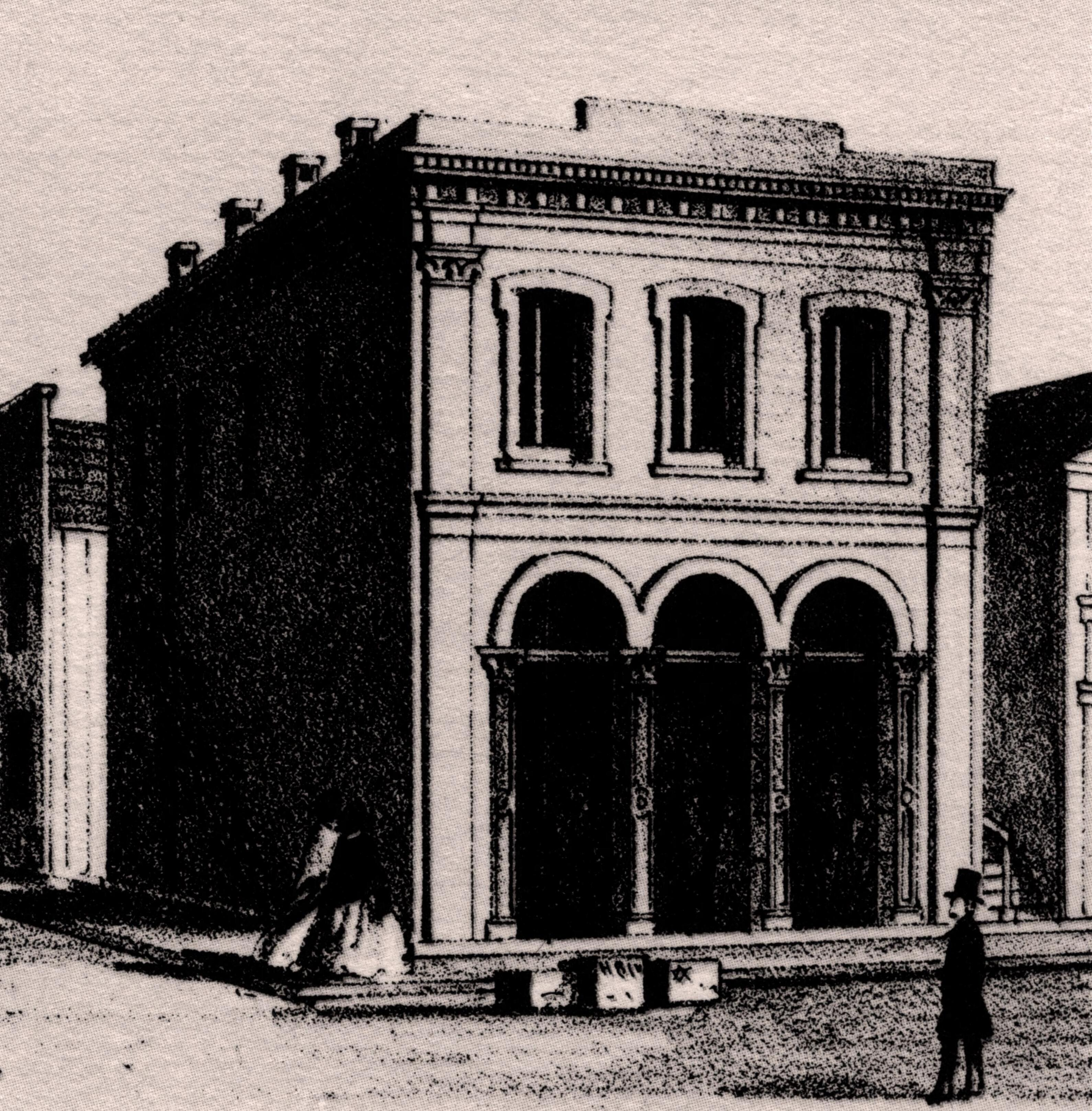
Portland's first brick building built in 1857

In 1850, Hallock left New York for Oregon. He established the architectural firm Hallock & Company with contractor William McMillan. He was commissioned to design and build the Washington County Courthouse, and was soon after commissioned by William S. Ladd to build the city's first brick building, which was located on Front Street. Hallock also designed and built homes for many prominent early Oregonians, including Cyrus Olney and Captain George Flanders.

In 1853, the firm was dissolved and Hallock formed Hallock, Lou, Day, & Company with other local architects. This firm designed and built many of Portland's early buildings.

In 1863, Hallock was appointed city surveyor, and established and laid out grades for the streets in Downtown. He surveyed and mapped many parts of the city, as well as the townsite of Astoria, Oregon.

=== Portland City Council ===
Hallock was elected to the Portland City Council four different times in 1857, 1859, 1866, and 1870.

== Personal life ==
Hallock married Mary Tiffany Bliss on April 22, 1855. They had two children, Bessie and Edward.
