= Rachael Rapinoe =

American soccer player (born 1985)

Personal information
- Full name: Rachael Elizabeth Rapinoe
- Date of birth: July 5, 1985 (age 41)
- Place of birth: Redding, California, U.S.
- Height: 5 ft 4 in (1.63 m)
- Positions: Midfielder; forward

Youth career
- Elk Grove United

College career
Years	Team	Apps	(Gls)
2004–2007	Portland Pilots		

Senior career*
Years	Team	Apps	(Gls)
2010	Stjarnan Women	5	(2)

International career
2006	United States U-23		
- * Club domestic league appearances and goals

Rachael Elizabeth Rapinoe (born July 5, 1985) is an American former soccer player who played as a midfielder and forward. She played for Stjarnan Women in Iceland and the United States women's national under-23 soccer team.

== Early life ==
Rapinoe grew up in Redding, California, with her parents, Jim and Denise, and five siblings, including her fraternal twin sister, Megan Rapinoe, who also became a professional soccer player. She has Italian (from her paternal grandfather) and Irish ancestry. She attended Foothill High School, where she played both basketball and track, but did not play soccer initially. She and her sister later played for club soccer team Elk Grove United, ranked number one nationally in 2003 and which finished second at the 2003 U-19 National Championships.

=== University of Portland ===
Rapinoe attended the University of Portland, majoring in life science. She became the Portland Pilots go-to scorer in 2006 after a midseason switch from defender to forward after her sister Megan experienced an ACL injury. She scored nine goals and seven assists, including five goals in four playoff games.

In 2007, she was named West Coast Conference Co-Player of the Week.

Rapinoe experienced a torn knee ligament injury in 2007, re-torn in 2008, which was said to be a career-ender; she did play after that date, until the ligament tore again in 2012.

She later announced that she had retired from soccer and was interested in pursuing a career in medicine. In 2016, she received a Master's degree in Health Studies in Exercise from Portland State.

== Playing career ==
=== Club ===
==== Stjarnan Women ====
In July 2010, Rapinoe re-emerged on the international soccer scene when it was announced that she had signed with Icelandic professional women's team, Stjarnan Women. She made five appearances for the team and scored two goals.

=== International ===
In 2006, Rapinoe played for the United States women's national under-23 soccer team.

== Coaching career ==
In 2011, Rachael Rapinoe was chosen to represent the United States by the International Center's Sports Corps program in the Indonesia America Soccer Exchange where she helped conduct three one-day training clinics for an estimated 200–300 female athletes and 30 coaches.

She has hosted youth soccer camps with her sister Megan Rapinoe.

== Personal life ==
Rapinoe is gay. She married Mary Gray on September 19, 2026.
