= Jo Ann Hardesty =

American politician (born 1957)

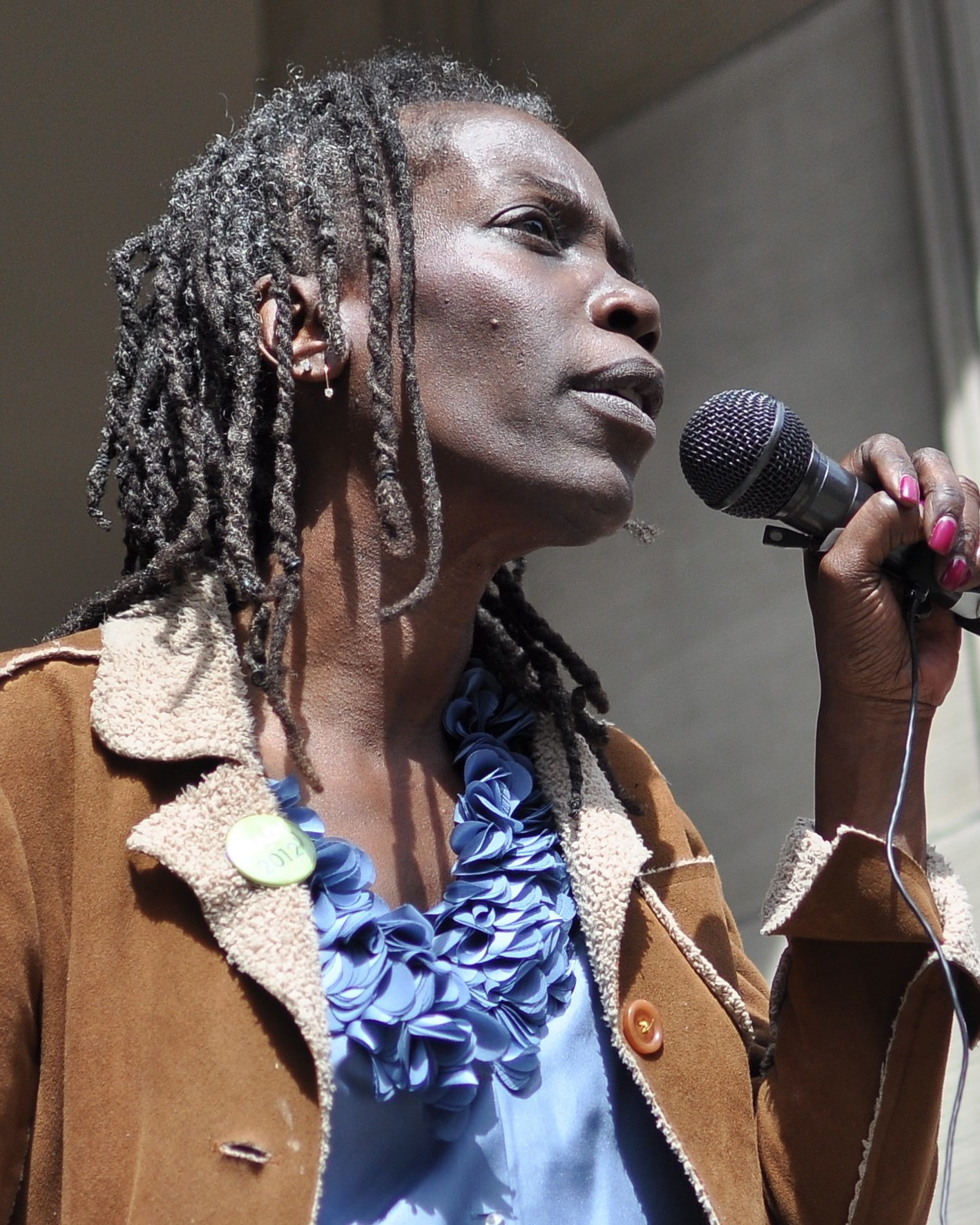
- Hardesty in 2012

Portland City Commissioner
- In office January 1, 2019 – December 31, 2022
- Preceded by: Dan Saltzman
- Succeeded by: Rene Gonzalez

Member of the Oregon House of Representatives from the 19th district
- In office January 1995 – February 2001
- Preceded by: Avel Gordly
- Succeeded by: Jackie Dingfelder

Personal details
- Born: October 15, 1957 (age 68) Baltimore, Maryland, U.S.
- Party: Democratic
- Education: Baltimore City Community College (AA)
- Website: Joann for Portland

Military service
- Branch/service: United States Navy

Jo Ann A. Hardesty (formerly Bowman, born October 15, 1957) is an American Democratic politician in the U.S. state of Oregon who served as a Portland City commissioner from 2019 to 2022. She previously served in the Oregon House of Representatives from 1995 until 2001.

Hardesty was the first African American woman and first minority woman to serve on the council. A longtime activist for racial justice and other progressive policy issues, she is well known as an advocate for police reform and defunding. In 2021, Portland Police Bureau's internal investigation concluded their officers leaked a false accusation that she was responsible for a hit and run in an act of retaliation. Hardesty faced several controversies during her tenure in office, such as her handling of personal credit card debt, vacation time, and placing a call to 9-1-1 over a dispute with a Lyft driver.

Hardesty stood for the November 2022 election runoff to serve a second term, but lost the seat to challenger Rene Gonzalez.

== Early life and education ==
Hardesty was born and raised in Baltimore, Maryland, as one of 10 children born to her longshoreman father and stay-at-home mother. She graduated from Edmondson-Westside High School and earned an Associate of Arts degree in business and accounting from the Baltimore City Community College.

== Career ==
After graduating from high school, Hardesty joined the United States Navy. She served for six years and was stationed in the Philippines.

After leaving the Navy, Hardesty settled in Portland, Oregon. She was elected to the Oregon House in 1994, holding office until 2001, when she resigned to unsuccessfully run for chair of the Multnomah County Board of Commissioners. She later served as executive director of Oregon Action, and became president of the Portland chapter of the NAACP in January 2015. Oregon Public Broadcasting reported Hardesty and the NAACP chapter did not report her income to the IRS or pay taxes on it, which Hardesty then amended.

In 2007 Hardesty began hosting "Voices from the Edge," a progressive talk radio program on KBOO, a community radio station in Portland. The call-in show addresses racial disparity, government accountability, environmental justice and politics on local, state and national levels. Hardesty suspended the show during her 2018 campaign to avoid violating the FCC's Equal-time rule, then resumed the show in March 2019.

=== Portland City Commissioner ===
==== 2018 race ====
Hardesty ran for Portland City Council in 2018, for the open seat being vacated by the retiring Dan Saltzman. The alternative newspaper Willamette Week endorsed Hardesty, stating she was the "best person for the job." She was also endorsed by AFSCME Local 189, the local branch of the American Federation of State, County and Municipal Employees. During the race, Hardesty called her top two running-mates "idiots" for their suggestion the unused Wapato Corrections Facility be utilized to house homeless residents. It is now used as a homeless shelter. Hardesty won the race, against Multnomah County Commissioner Loretta Smith; the final tally showed her receiving 61.8% of the votes cast.

==== Commissioner term ====
Hardesty was sworn in as a city commissioner on January 2, 2019. She is the first Black woman and first minority woman to serve on the council. She is highly critical of the Portland Police Bureau. Oregon Public Broadcasting describes Hardesty as "one of the city's most vocal police critics". In 2020, Hardesty voted to cut $18 million in funding from the Portland Police Bureau budget. The vote failed 3–2.

As acting Fire Commissioner, Hardesty was criticized for her month-long vacation in August 2021, which coincides with peak fire season in the region. "That means she will not be available for feedback, council or check-ins. We do not make exceptions for this," announced her chief of staff of the move. This was the first time in over twenty years that a city commissioner took a full month away from the position.

==== 2022 race ====
Hardesty ran for reelection to City Council on the 2022 ballot. Hardesty was the first of the three frontrunners for the position who hit her limit on fundraising caps. Oregon Public Broadcasting reported over a dozen "union and left-leaning advocacy groups" had endorsed Hardesty as of April 2022, as well as U.S. Senator Jeff Merkley and U.S. Representative Earl Blumenauer, both from Oregon, and Multnomah County District Attorney Mike Schmidt. Willamette Week also endorsed Hardesty for the second time, an endorsement which the newspaper's editorial department stated was met with "frustration and scorn" from readers and respondents. Hardesty placed first in the primary with 44% of the vote.

Having received less than 50% of the vote, she advanced to a runoff in the November 2022 general election. Portland Firefighters Association announced in September 2022 that it was not endorsing Hardesty who was assigned to manage Portland Fire & Rescue. The union announced it is instead endorsing her opponent Rene Gonzalez. In October 2022, Willamette Week withdrew their May support for Hardesty stating "Hardesty has proven unwilling or unable to make a compromise with those who disagree with her, and that's why we're withdrawing our May endorsement" and changed their endorsement to her opponent Rene Gonzalez. While the election results had not been officially certified, The Oregonian announced Gonzalez had won by early November 9, saying he had "soundly defeated" Hardesty. She conceded the race later that day.

== Personal life ==
Hardesty was married to Skip Elliott Bowman in 1995; they divorced in 2008. By 2014, she was married to Roger Hardesty.

In November 2020, Hardesty called 9-1-1 during a dispute with a Lyft driver. The driver had refused to roll up a window, citing Lyft's pandemic air circulation recommendations. Hardesty was picked up from Ilani Casino Resort, and was about to be unexpectedly dropped off at a closing filling station along I-5 when she called 911 to report safety concerns about being about to be left alone on the side of the road in the dark, telling the dispatcher, "Well, I've got a Lyft driver that decided he would just drop me off at a filling station. Well, I'm not getting out of the car, in the dark, at a filling station, not happening - all because I asked him to put the window up. I'm not leaving." The event drew national attention.

Hardesty was erroneously accused of a hit and run in 2021. An internal investigation at the Portland Police Bureau found that there was no evidence behind the claims, and that the report claiming the incident was fabricated and disseminated to news outlets by three PPB officers, one of whom was acting as union president at the time. Hardesty has since filed a $3 million lawsuit against the Portland Police Association. The Portland Police Bureau confirmed in a letter to Hardesty that the officers' actions were an act of retaliation. Additionally, as a result of an internal affairs investigation, two of the officers involved received formal disciplinary action, and the former union president was fired by Portland Mayor Ted Wheeler.

In March 2022, Hardesty was issued a judgment for $16,000 after failing to appear in court on the matter of unpaid credit card debt she had accumulated. The debt was accumulated between two credit card accounts. The judge ordered her to pay the full amount. Hardesty resolved a case with an unknown creditor for $4,400 in unpaid debt in the past.

In September 2023, Hardesty settled with the Portland Police Union with Hardesty receiving $680,000 over the claim two police officers who leaked information implicating Hardesty as a hit and run suspect. The police union's insurance carrier decided to offer a settlement.
