= Adam Quick =

Australian basketball player

Personal information
- Born: 1 September 1981 (age 45) Melbourne, Victoria
- Listed height: 187 cm (6 ft 2 in)
- Listed weight: 82 kg (181 lb)

Career information
- College: Portland (2000–2004)
- NBA draft: 2004: undrafted
- Position: Guard

Career history
- 2004–2006: Townsville Crocodiles
- 2006–2007: South Dragons

Adam Steel Quick (born 1 September 1981) was an Australian professional basketball player, formally of the Australian National Basketball League (NBL).

Quick played for the Nunawading Spectres as a junior before attending the University of Portland in the United States for four years, before returning to Australia to play for the Townsville Crocodiles for two years. He had a successful debut season for the Crocs, however, tore his ACL before his second season, and was sidelined.

Looking to move back to Melbourne after getting married, he requested permission to talk to debut franchise the South Dragons. This was granted and he then became the sixth player to sign with the Dragons in April 2006. It is viewed that he will serve primarily as a back-up to Shane Heal.

Quick represented Australia as a Junior at the World Championships in 1999 (Portugal) and 2001 (Japan).
