= 2022 Portland, Oregon, City Commission election =

The 2022 Portland City Commission elections were held on May 17, 2022, and November 8, 2022.

Two positions were up for election. Position 2 and Position 3 were held by Dan Ryan and Jo Ann Hardesty, respectively, who both ran for re-election.

Portland has no term-limits on officeholders.

== Position 2 ==
Portland City Commission Position 2 election
- May 17, 2022
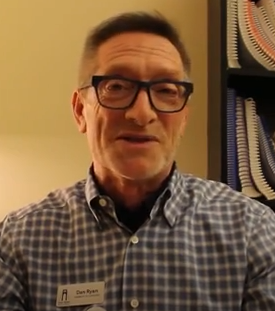

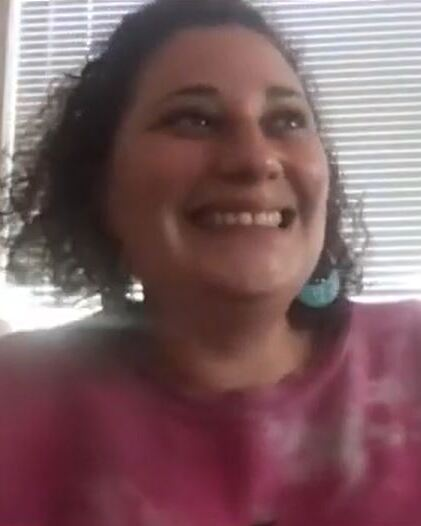

Candidate	Dan Ryan	Alanna McCreary	Sandeep Bali
Party	Nonpartisan	Nonpartisan	Nonpartisan
Popular vote	89,251	45,721	12,913
Percentage	54.5%	27.9%	7.9%
Commissioner before election
Dan Ryan
Elected Commissioner
Dan Ryan

Incumbent Dan Ryan filed for re-election. Four other candidates also filed to run for the seat, and two additional candidates filed but subsequently withdrew from the race.

=== Candidates ===
- Sandeep Bali
- Chris Brummer
- Avraham Cox
- Steven Cox
- Alanna Joy "AJ" McCreary, founder and executive director of Equitable Giving Circle
- Dan Ryan, incumbent City Commissioner
- Michael Simpson, X-ray technician and volunteer for AFL–CIO
- Renee Stephens
- Sophie Sumney-Koivisto, karaoke Host

=== Withdrawn ===
- Jamila Aurora Dozier, Policy Coordinator at Portland Housing Bureau
- Brandon Farley

=== Debate ===
2022 Portland City Commission Position 2 debate
No.	Date	Host	Moderator	Link	Nonpartisan	Nonpartisan
Key: P Participant A Absent N Not invited I Invited W Withdrawn						
Key: P Participant A Absent N Not invited I Invited W Withdrawn					Dan Ryan	Alanna McCreary
1	Apr. 5, 2022	City Club of Portland	Elisa Dozono	YouTube	P	P

=== Results ===
Primary election
Party	Candidate	Votes	%
Nonpartisan	Dan Ryan	89,251	54.5%
Nonpartisan	Alanna McCreary	45,721	27.9%
Nonpartisan	Sandeep Bali	12,913	7.9%
Nonpartisan	Stephan Cox	4,802	3.0%
Nonpartisan	Chris Brummer	3,830	2.3%
Nonpartisan	Renee Stephens	3,300	2.0%
Nonpartisan	Michael Simpson	1,756	1.1%
Nonpartisan	Sophie Sumney-Koivisto	1,314	0.8%
Nonpartisan	Avraham Cox	326	0.2%
Nonpartisan	Write-ins	470	0.3%
Total votes		163,673	

== Position 3 ==
Portland City Commission Position 3 election
- May 17, 2022 & November 8, 2022
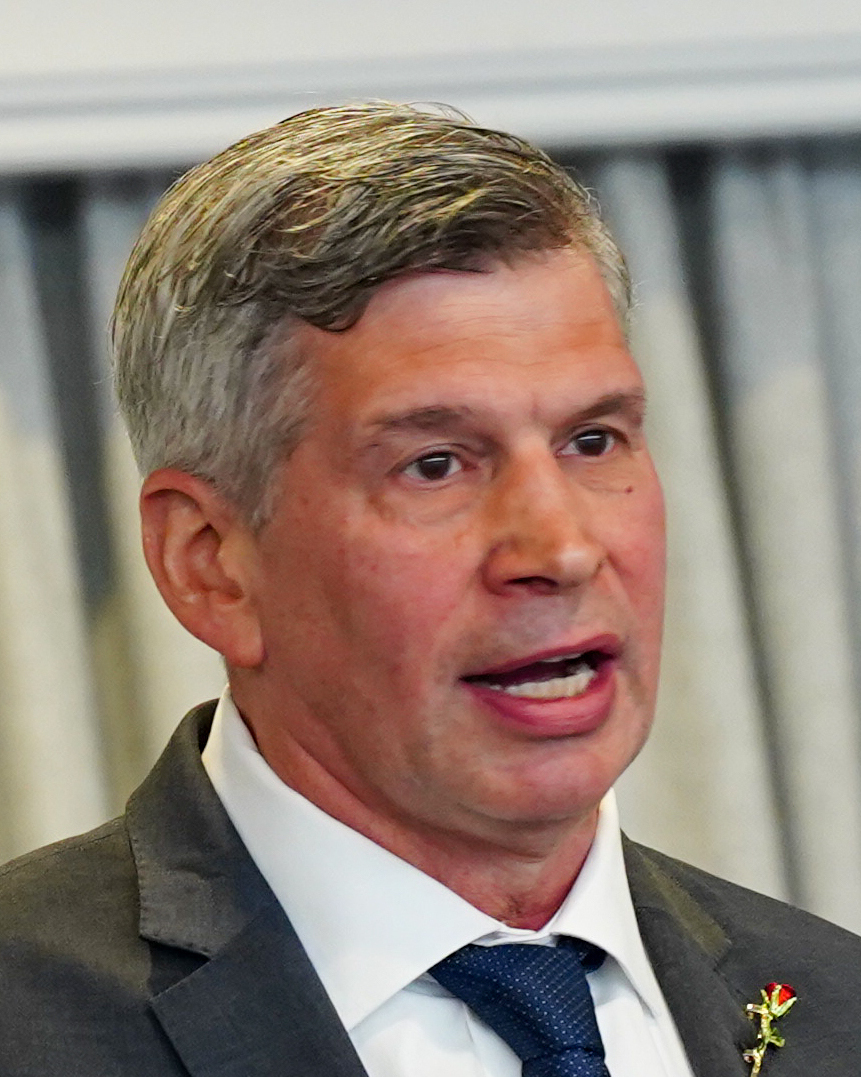

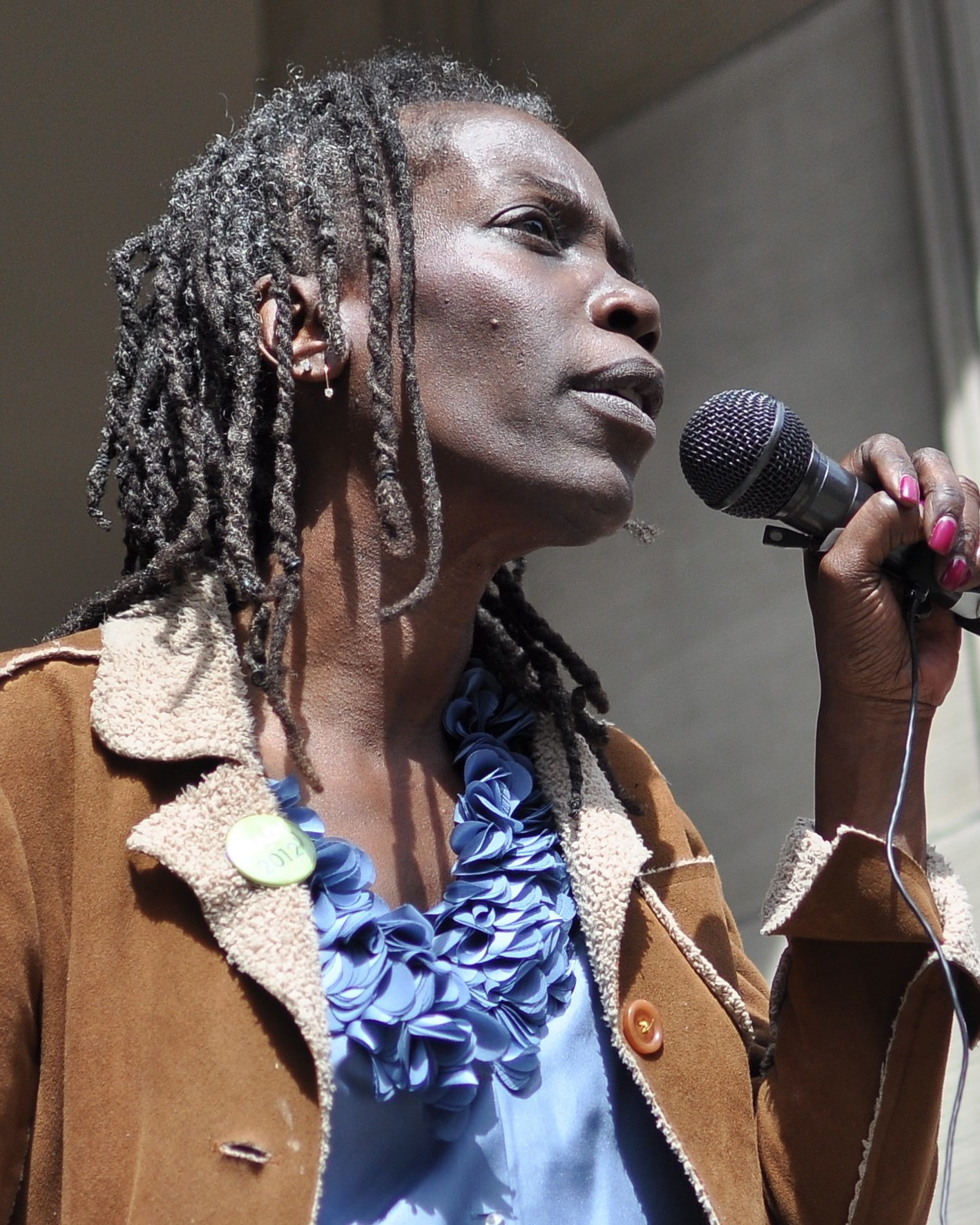

Candidate	Rene Gonzalez	Jo Ann Hardesty	Vadim Mozyrsky
Party	Nonpartisan	Nonpartisan	Nonpartisan
First round	38,760; 23.16%	73,152; 43.72%	37,218; 22.24%
Second round	150,512; 52.54%	135,089; 47.15%	Eliminated
Commissioner before election
Jo Ann Hardesty
Elected Commissioner
Rene Gonzalez

Incumbent Jo Ann Hardesty filed for re-election. Seven other candidates also filed to run for the seat, including Rene Gonzalez, a local attorney. Since no candidate received a majority of votes in the May primary election, Hardesty and Gonzalez, the top two vote-getters, both advanced to the November general election. Gonzalez won in November, with 52.59% of the vote (as of November 23, 2022), emphasizing law-and-order policies and promising to crack down on homelessness.

=== Candidates ===
- Rene Gonzalez, attorney
- Jo Ann Hardesty, incumbent City Commissioner
- Dale Hardt
- Chad Leisey, business owner and volunteer firefighter
- Vadim Mozyrsky, administrative law judge
- Peggy Sue Owens, glass company administrator
- Karellen Stephens
- Jeffrey A. Wilebski, teacher and school administrator

=== Debates ===
2022 Portland City Commission Position 3 debates
No.	Date	Host	Moderator	Link	Nonpartisan	Nonpartisan	Nonpartisan
Key: P Participant A Absent N Not invited I Invited W Withdrawn							
Key: P Participant A Absent N Not invited I Invited W Withdrawn					Jo Ann Hardesty	Rene Gonzalez	Vadim Mozyrsky
1	Apr. 7, 2022	City Club of Portland	Chabre Vickers	YouTube	P	P	P
	May 17, 2022	Primary election is held.					
2	Sep. 30, 2022	City Club of Portland; KGW	David Molko	YouTube	P	P	N
3	Oct. 27, 2022	KOIN	Ken Boddie	KOIN	P	P	N

=== Results ===
Primary election
Party	Candidate	Votes	%
Nonpartisan	Jo Ann Hardesty	73,152	43.72%
Nonpartisan	Rene Gonzalez	38,760	23.16%
Nonpartisan	Vadim Mozyrsky	37,218	22.24%
Nonpartisan	Kim Kasch	4,548	2.72%
Nonpartisan	Peggy Sue Owens	2,046	1.22%
Nonpartisan	Ed Baker	1,226	0.73%
Nonpartisan	Jeffrey A. Wilebski	1,075	0.64%
Nonpartisan	Dale Hardt	858	0.51%
Nonpartisan	Chad Leisey	756	0.45%
Nonpartisan	Karellen Stephens	652	0.39%
Nonpartisan	Write-ins	208	0.12%
Total votes		167,330	100.00%

General election
Party	Candidate	Votes	%
Nonpartisan	Rene Gonzalez	150,512	52.54%
Nonpartisan	Jo Ann Hardesty	135,089	47.15%
Nonpartisan	Write-ins	900	0.31%
Total votes		286,501	100.00%
