= Liv Osthus =

American writer, musician, actress and stripper

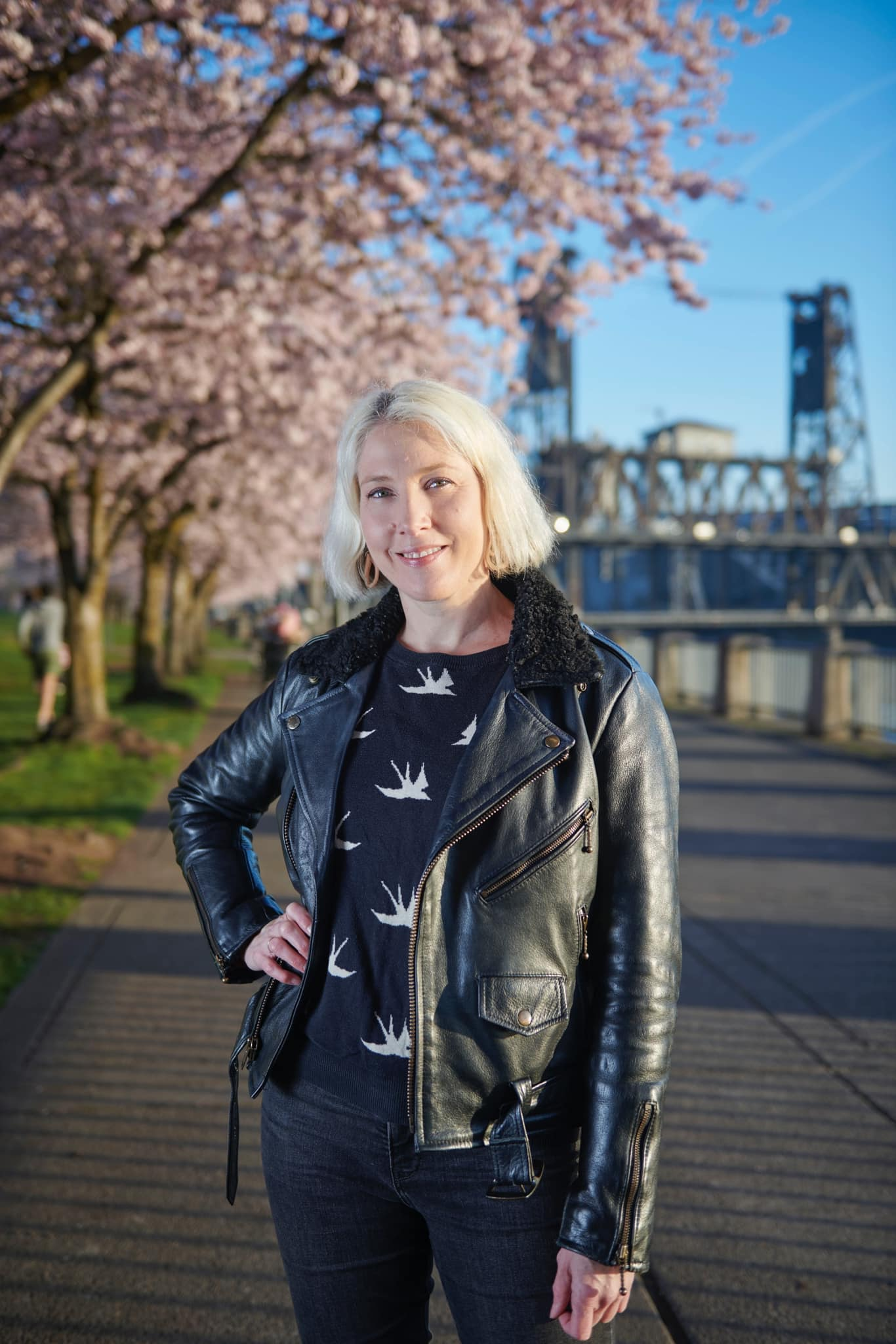
- Born: Liv Osthus; July 27, 1974 (age 52); Sioux Falls, South Dakota, U.S.
- Occupations: writer, dancer
- Years active: 1997–present
- Political party: Democratic
- Other political affiliations: Democratic Socialists of America

Liv Osthus is an American writer, activist, musician, stripper, and former candidate for Mayor of Portland, Oregon. Having performed for more than twenty-five years under the stage name Viva Las Vegas, she has written two books about her experiences on stage, in addition to writing for outlets including The Village Voice and The New York Times Magazine.

Described as the "Diva of the Demimonde" by Geek Love author Katherine Dunn, she has been dubbed the most literate and most famous stripper in Portland, Oregon. Willamette Week described her as a "renaissance woman who's authored memoirs, sings punk and French medieval music alike, and has beaten breast cancer to perform into her 40s". Her cultural influence in the city extends to inspiring a feature-length documentary, Thank You for Supporting the Arts, and a one act opera, Viva's Holiday.

A member of the Democratic Party and the Democratic Socialists of America, Osthus was a candidate in the 2024 Portland, Oregon mayoral election, finishing in fifth place out of twenty candidates.

== Early life and education ==
Osthus was born in Sioux Falls, South Dakota to Mark and Christine Osthus in 1975. Her father was a Lutheran pastor. Both parents have indicated that Osthus enjoyed performing as a child, and her mother thought she may choose a theatrical career. Osthus has indicated that she had trouble maintaining relationships as a child, which continued until she was accepted into Portland's punk scene.

Osthus received a degree in cultural anthropology from Williams College. During her degree, she completed field work in Bali and East Africa analyzing societal traditions. These excursions led her to learn conversational Indonesian and Swahili language, in addition to her knowledge of French and German. She has indicated that her academic training resulted in her thinking critically about sexual mores.

== Dancing ==
Osthus' first experience inside a strip club was during a collegiate spring break, and she has spoken at length about her initial surprise at discovering both the artistry of the performances and the intimacy between performers and audience. "The actual human connection was different from so much theater and art I'd seen ... in college, where it tends to be really intellectual," she recalled. "It's the difference between listening to a ... CD and going to a rock show." Even when starting out, she never remembers feeling the strip club was somehow different from any other stage. After decades of performances in venues of every size across the globe, she's defined three guiding principles – "connection is paramount, sex work is important ... and stripping is art!"

Shy and body-conscious during adolescence, she believes stripping helped her find comfort within her own skin for the first time. Explaining why she prefers to perform entirely naked on stage instead of donning a g-string or similar garment intended to aid the partial concealment of genitals many state and civil authorities now demand, Osthus has said that she finds the shameful implications distasteful. "What she loves most about stripping," acclaimed arts website Hyperallergic wrote, "is its celebration of the body, that sex itself is a delight."

She has been accused of romanticizing the industry as a stripper pollyanna relentlessly shilling only the most positive aspects of the profession. In an excerpt from her memoir published by the Portland Mercury, it's implied she left data entry for stripping largely because she preferred the sex workers' fashion sense.

At the same time, she did recognize the larger societal implications when first climbing on stage in 1997 as a penniless young writer trailing an awful breakup. "My new career," she wrote, "preacher's daughter thrown to the wolves in a dirty timber town."

In 2008, Osthus was diagnosed with breast cancer at age 33. One week before her diagnosis, Osthus had performed The Rollng Stones "Dontcha" at Portland strip club Mary's Club, which she had planned to be her last performance before retiring from stripping. Dr. Nathalie Johnson, a surgeon and former dancer who'd spent a season with the Alvin Ailey company before focusing upon medicine, conducted surgery to remove her left breast on September 28. Soon after, she returned to the stage — realizing anew the importance of Mary's as sanctuary and her dancing compatriots as found family. Moreover, she found herself surprisingly excited to rejoin her comrades. "Seeing those women in the dressing room, trading stories ... I'm probably more jazzed than ... i was ten years ago."

Osthus has stated that dancing forced her to confront newly awakened insecurities and said that nurses often recommend other cancer patients visit her at Mary's. Arguing that her swift return to the stage following the procedure helped heal her body and mind, she has even joked that her cancer treatment facility needs a pole. "I felt so distant from my body after that initial mastectomy. Then, back on stage, no one noticed." Additionally, the 2015 birth of her daughter Charlotte underlined the importance of a dependable revenue stream that would not curtail family time.

Well aware that most dancers do not consider their stagecraft especially artistic, Osthus doesn't try to correct their perceptions but does feel a certain responsibility to emphasize the work of sex workers as actual labor. "This is the more-viable career, and I can be my own boss in this industry." she told Willamette Week. "Sex work can be a godsend for entrepreneurial women."

Although certainly older than the average sex worker, Osthus has previously pointed to the example set by octogenarian dancers maintaining regular shifts in Las Vegas. She credits mom-and-pop-type bars like Mary's with extending her time on stage as well as the general expectations of Portland, where it's not uncommon to see dancers last more than a decade at the same club and (she believes) depth of sincerity matters more to audiences than tautness of flesh. Strippers last "longer than a lot of other dancing careers. If you stay healthy and keep your head in the game, you have more to offer every year."

== Writing ==
Osthus remained a writer throughout her stripping career and has said that she always viewed her work on the stage as an extension of the craft. When she first moved to Portland she debated another young woman who claimed that strip bars essentially promoted violence against women. One of their debates took place at the offices of local alternative newspaper Willamette Week, which published an edited version of their discourse with her picture on that issue's cover page.

Osthus' newfound notoriety in Portland led to a meeting with the owners of Exotic Magazine, a lifestyle magazine that doubled as a regional adult entertainment guide, who offered her the position of music editor. From 1998 to 2001 Osthus combined zine-inspired backstage coverage of various touring acts with sex worker gossip and political commentary.

In 2001, Osthus moved to New York City, where her stories appeared in The New York Times Magazine and The Village Voice, but returned to Portland shortly after the September 11 attacks. Over the next few years, she tended bar at a number of bars across Portland. She assumed the Main Editor's role for Exotic and readied her memoir, Magic Gardens, for publication.

As she would later explain in a magazine feature detailing her experiences entitled "The Last Days of My Left Breast", plans for a return to New York and MFA program were necessarily shelved following her battle with cancer. That piece, commissioned by Portland Monthly for their March 2009 issue and printed under her Viva Las Vegas nom de plume, was among five finalists for the annual CRMA Awards' prestigious feature prize.

"The Last Days of My Left Breast" would appear the following year under the "Apocrypha" section of Osthus' second book Gospel According to Viva Las Vegas. Published in conjunction with the second printing of Magic Gardens, the collection assembled dozens of interviews and articles she'd penned for Exotic magazine around the turn of the aughts.

On May 28, 2022, alongside a diverse selection of invitees including poet Atticus and Meow Wolf co-founder Vince Kadlubek, Osthus spoke at Portland's 10th annual TEDx conference.

In recent years, Osthus has lectured on aesthetics for a Portland State University philosophy course. In 2016, she participated in the Association of Writers & Writing Programs' Women on the Verge – Authentic Voices from Outsider Lit panel discussion. At the 2017 PUGSfest celebration of ideas, she led discussions titled "Art, Women's Bodies + the Revolution" and "Strip Stages: Spaces of Resistance, Healing, and Power."

In 2015, Osthus told Willamette Week that she "used to make lots of money writing, and now that's more or less dried up". Five years later, commenting upon her 23 years on stage to Here Magazine she admitted that she'd "thought by now I would have moved on ... I'd love to write more books, but lord knows I've gotta marry rich first."

== Film ==
Although she never seriously pursued acting as a career, Osthus' local celebrity garnered her appearances in around a dozen Portland-shot productions including indie features such as Paranoid Park and The Auteur.

Park director Gus Van Sant would later cast Osthus in both his short contribution — entitled "First Kiss" — for the 2007 anthology To Each His Own Cinema, bringing her along to the Cannes premiere, and his 2011 film Restless, where she makes a cameo appearance. In interviews, the Portland-based filmmaker talked about bringing out-of-towners to Mary's and introducing them to Viva – singling out Sean Penn as one star entranced by Viva's varied skills and interests.

Documentarian Carolann Stoney had been planning a feature on the stories of several Portland-area dancers when she walked into Mary's and first saw Osthus chatting with customers. The director grew fascinated with learning why this "very intelligent, very sweet person, very loving, very centered ... woman with an education [who] speaks four languages" would take her clothes off for money. Osthus, for her part, had grown inured to the pitches offered by various reality programs that cared only about manipulating events to illustrate a pre-determined storyline independent of any larger truth, but Stoney and co-director W. Alexander Jones seemed genuinely excited to set aside prior notions and record her story however it would unfold.

By filming's end, they'd spent four years following Osthus through her mastectomy and birth of her daughter while assembling their intimate portrait of clips taken from all stages of Osthus' life intercut with testimonials from friends and exes. According to producer Jessica Daugherty, everyone within Osthus' sphere was happy to appear aside from her parents, who remained visibly reticent about participating due to their continued misgivings about their daughter's career.

Thank You For Supporting The Arts received mostly positive reviews from Portland-area publications. Its title comes from Osthus' signature catchphrase – itself borrowed from an old PBS fundraising slogan – that she began employing to avoid transactional awkwardness her first few months dancing at Magic Gardens. Hyperallergic thought the documentary's greatest comfort was its "focus on her community — the warmth she found following her cancer diagnosis and subsequent treatment, the folks who help care for her child".

Conversely, Oregon ArtsWatch found it "almost suspicious that [the film] doesn't include any cautionary tales of life" from her decades-long experience within the Northwest's sex industry. Potentially more troubling, Willamette Week thought the absence of her fellow strippers' perspectives supported the classist perspectives of her loved ones as they raced to explain how Osthus' functional upbringing and education separated her from the pack. The Portland Mercury acknowledged faults with uncertain pacing and stilted voiceovers but thought the film brought out the best of its star.

In the winter of 2022, the producers reached an agreement with Cinema Libre, who released the film for DVD and video on demand distribution and approved a premiere at Portland's Hollywood Theatre, with an after party held at Mary's Club.

== Music ==
Osthus initially moved to Portland in hopes of playing in rock bands and soon became singer of Coco Cobra & The Killers. The aggressively-sexualized take on classic punk played some high-profile shows and released a pair of albums: The I Need Sex Sessions (2004) and Want You! (2005).

Following Coco Cobra's extended hiatus, Osthus briefly led classic country troupe the Lesser Saints where she covered favorite tunes from American stalwarts like Johnny Cash and Emmylou Harris. During interviews, she has often speculated that if only she hadn't "found the stripping stage so seductive, maybe my musical career would've taken off".

In 2009, Osthus helped launch Gallic vocal group Bergerette with fellow dancer and promoter Stella Pentimenti and Live Wire Radio veteran Pat Jankowski to celebrate the birthday of Mary's Club owner Vicki Keller. They performed their first show at Mary's with 25 of the club's entertainers accompanying on handbell.

Although 'bergerette' is itself a type of chanson, Osthus has said that aspect was merely coincidental since the trio intended their name to play upon the traditional Christmas carol "Nous Etions Trois Bergerettes" ("We Were Three Shepherdesses") as well as the rather more profane role that European folk tales of the Middle Ages thrust upon the shepherdess – "the lusty, earthy, heroine of Renaissance smut lore".

They continued to expand their medieval repertoire of bawdy pop-classique for 2012 debut album Beguiled and, the following year, collaborated with Portland composer Christopher Corbell on singles "Tristesses de la Lune" and "Hymne", which feature passages from Charles Baudelaire's "Les Fleurs del Mal" scored to Corbell's music. In 2013, alongside The Gnash and Vodka Wilson Overdrive, they contributed a capella track "Dona Nobis Doughnut" to a split seven-inch 45 RPM record on the Voodoo Doughnut label. Ennemi du Sommeil, a sophomore album with liner notes by legendary rock critic Richard Meltzer, was self-released in 2015.

== Opera ==
According to Osthus', the first she remembers hearing about an opera drawn from her life was during a Mary's shift from 2012 when an apparent acolyte approached clutching her memoir. He asked permission to craft an opera based upon her life, and she agreed without thinking much of the matter. As happened, trained composer/Classical Revolution PDX vet Chris Corbell was the intrusive superfan truly inspired by Viva's tale of coming clean to her parents about the direction of her career whilst returning home for the Yuletide aged 22. He'd suffered through a remarkably similar story at about the same age, unleashing bitter conflict within the household by attempting to improve communication, and he believed the simple narrative contained the elements necessary for a meaningful work of musical theater.

The resulting one-act, four-character, $20K-budgeted opera Viva's Holiday ran for one week at the Star Theater in December 2015 with a libretto co-written by Osthus and Corbell set to Corbell's music. (Corbell would also provide the score for a pole dance by guest performers held prior to each show.) Opera Theater Oregon music director Erica Melton helmed the 12 person "Cult of Orpheus" orchestra.

While trying to enlist other small companies in the piece, Corbell oversaw the opera's return to the stage the following year. Soprano Helen Funston played Viva during both productions. Corbell, meanwhile, excitedly told Oregon Public Broadcasting his hopes to join the ranks of those regular holiday shows and have our annual Portland stripper opera!"

== Critical response ==
In the foreword to Osthus' second book, Jim Goad explained Osthus' rarefied role as a bridge or translator between the more academically oriented proponents of Portland's burgeoning sex industry and the dancers themselves. "My peers in Women's Studies [made] damning claims about stripping, sight unseen," she has said, "[but] I believe you have to inhabit a culture and see it from the inside."

Media coverage of her technique inevitably contrasts the charm of Osthus' "sociological approach" when set against her more athletic contemporaries. The Oregonian commented on the absence of distance during her performances as she eagerly interacts with patrons of either gender while disrobing. "If you want to make money, you can give them the tits-and-ass show," she told the newspaper, "but I like to find common ground."

== Personal life ==
Although a registered Democrat, Osthus likes to learn about the full range of political perspectives, and she regularly engages in local issues that matter to her community. As Viva, she has been called an international touring advocate for strippers' rights. Under the alter ego 'Lila Hamilton', she testified before the Portland City Council and engaged city commissioner Jim Francesconi in impromptu debate about the potential consequences of a proposed municipal plan that would make the identities of sex workers public record.

Osthus has struggled with clinical depression throughout her life and began taking antidepressants as a teenager. As of 2017, she has discontinued antidepressants in favor of diet, exercise and talk therapy.

As of 2023, Osthus attended the Tabor Heights United Methodist Church in Portland's Mt. Tabor neighborhood and sang in the choir. Although she hesitates to call herself Christian, Osthus describes her background as "culturally Lutheran" and extols the virtues of "casseroles, forgiveness, hymns" as well as a personal calling for social work she believes Lutheranism instilled.

While contending religion has caused more pain than comfort, she sang a traditional hymn at her first book release celebration and has continually praised the legacy of Jesus, Martin Luther, and, especially, her pastor father. His non-judgemental, all-welcoming approach regularly draws her admiration. "We're a love-based religion," he told the Duluth News Tribune when appointed "bridge pastor" of three newly combined congregations. "Lutherans are the lovingest bunch of people."

Although Osthus' father disapproves of her chosen profession, she views him as a clear inspiration nonetheless and insists at the end of the day, their jobs aren't all that different. "I'm following in his footsteps as a preacher," she told Willamette Week about her stagework at Mary's Club. "Growing up, I saw how much hope he could give [and] I like to think I'm doing the same."
