= Mingus Mapps =

American politician

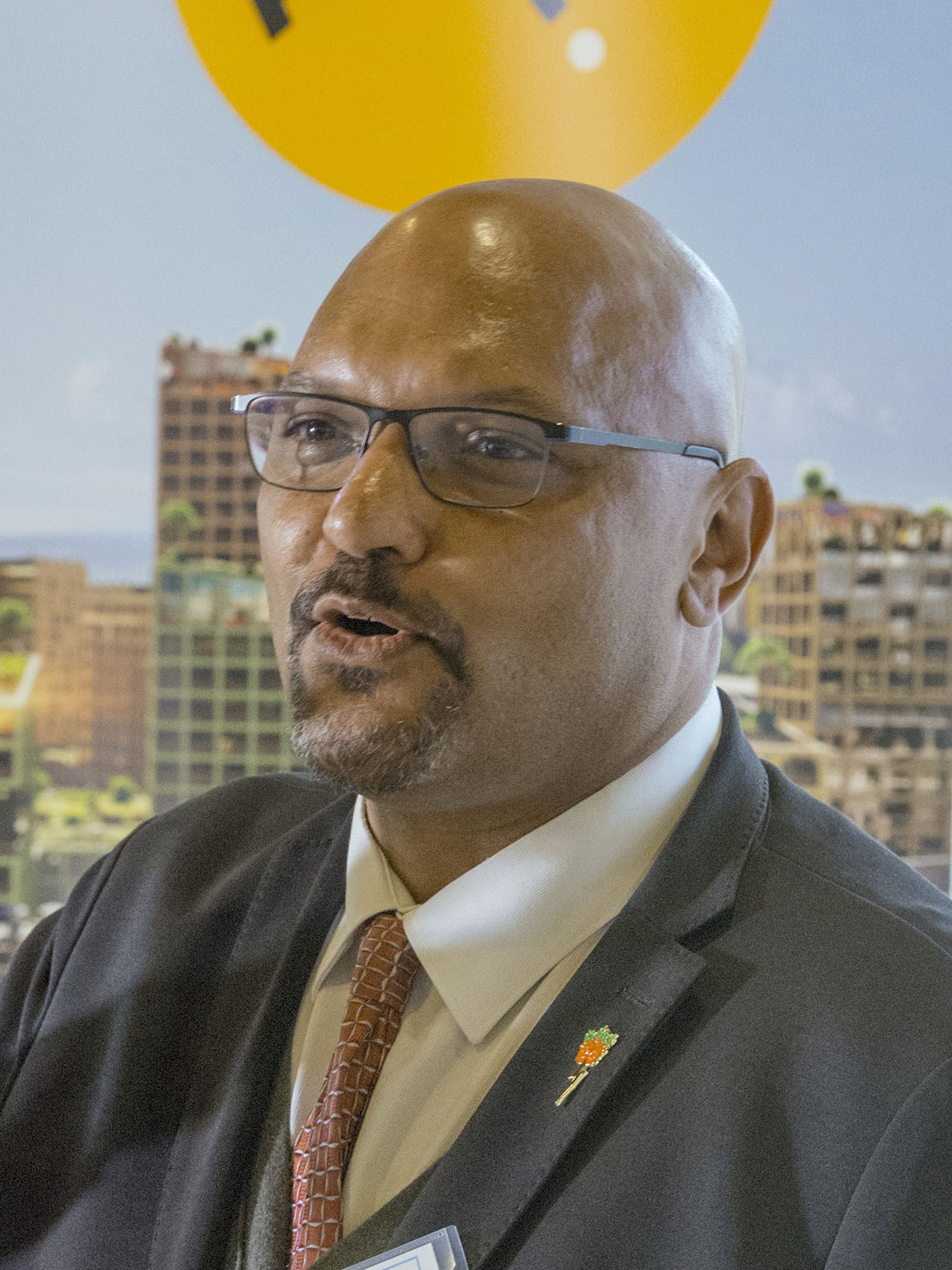
- Mapps in 2024

Portland City Commissioner
- In office January 1, 2021 – December 31, 2024
- Preceded by: Chloe Eudaly
- Succeeded by: Office abolished

Personal details
- Born: April 9, 1968 (age 58)
- Party: Democratic
- Education: Reed College (BA); Cornell University (PhD)

Mingus Ulysses Mapps (born April 9, 1968) is an American professor and politician in Portland, Oregon. He served on the Portland City Council from 2021 to 2024, assigned to the Water Bureau, the Bureau of Environmental Service and the Bureau of Transportation (PBOT). In 2024 he made an unsuccessful bid for Mayor of Portland.

== Education ==
Mapps graduated from Reed College and received his Ph.D. in government from Cornell University.

== Career ==
Mapps, a former political science professor, promised during his campaign to reform Portland's police department, pass policies that protect renters, expand mental health response teams called "Portland Street Response" in all parts of the city to reduce homelessness, and pay for more mental health services. He is the third black male ever to serve as a Portland commissioner.

Mapps was elected to Portland City Council in November 2020, earning 56% of the vote against incumbent Chloe Eudaly.

In July 2023, Mapps announced that he would run for mayor of Portland in the 2024 election. He was defeated in the general election.

== See also ==
- List of Cornell University alumni
- List of Reed College people
