= Carmen Rubio =

American politician

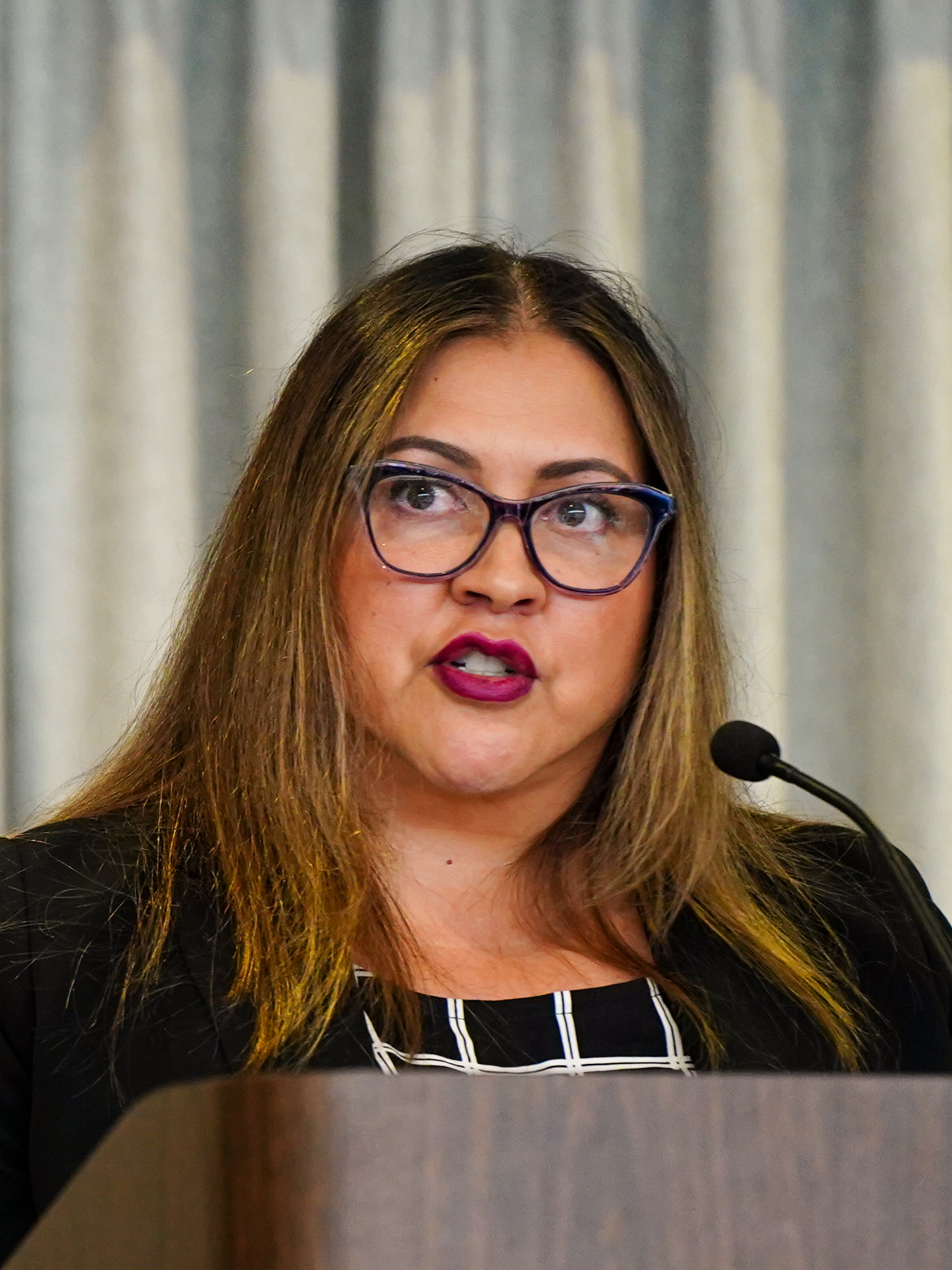
- Rubio in 2024

Member of the Portland City Commission from the at-large district Position 1
- In office December 28, 2020 – December 31, 2024
- Preceded by: Amanda Fritz
- Succeeded by: Constituency abolished

Personal details
- Born: 1973 or 1974 (age 52–53) Hillsboro, Oregon, U.S.
- Party: Democratic
- Education: University of Oregon (BA)

Carmen Rubio (born 1973) is an American politician and non-profit executive in the U.S. state of Oregon who served as a Portland City Commissioner from December 2020 to December 2024.

== Early life and education ==
Rubio was born and raised in Hillsboro, Oregon. She is of Mexican descent. Rubio graduated with a degree in political science from the University of Oregon in 1999.

== Career ==
In the late 1990s and early 2000s, Rubio worked as a policy advisor for Portland Commissioner Nick Fish and Multnomah County Commissioner Serena Cruz, and as director of community affairs for Portland Mayor Tom Potter. In 2009, she became the executive director of the Latino Network.

Rubio ran for Portland City Council in spring 2020, in a race to fill the seat then held by Amanda Fritz. In the May primary election, she defeated Candace Avalos, an administrator at Portland State University, to win election to a term that was officially to begin in January 2021. She was sworn into office a few days before that, on December 28, 2020.

On January 9, 2024, Rubio announced her candidacy for Mayor of Portland in the 2024 election. She was endorsed by Oregon Governor Tina Kotek in June.

In September 2024, The Oregonian reported that Rubio had received over 150 parking and traffic citations in Multnomah County since 2001, with her driver's license being suspended six times between 2001 and 2016 due to unpaid fines and failure to appear in court. Rubio lost an endorsement from labor union Laborers' International Union of North America Local 737 following the report. Several days later, after The Oregonian reported that Rubio had hit a parked car in a parking lot, transportation non-profit The Street Trust Action Fund rescinded their endorsement as well.

Rubio finished second in the November general election, winning 40% of the final vote in the instant-runoff election.

After leaving public office Rubio was hired as executive director of Janus Youth Programs, a non-profit that runs programs for at-risk youth, in summer 2025.

== See also ==
- List of Mexican Americans
- List of people from Hillsboro, Oregon
- List of University of Oregon alumni
