= Patriarchal Order of the Holy Cross of Jerusalem =

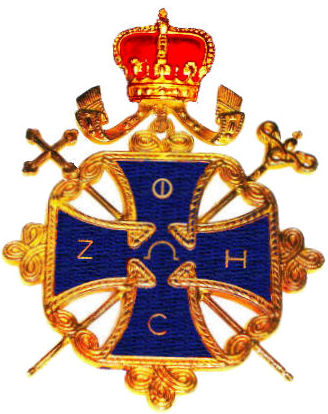
- Cross of the order
- Type: Lay order Ecclesiastical decoration
- Founded: 14 September 1979
- Religious affiliation: Melkite Greek Catholic
- Motto: Greek: Φως και Ζωη (Fos kai Zoe) – "Light and life"
- Grand Master: Patriarch Youssef Absi
- Ribbon bar of the order

The Patriarchal Order of the Holy Cross of Jerusalem is a Catholic honorific lay order and ecclesiastical decoration established in 1979 by Patriarch Maximos V Hakim of the Melkite Greek Catholic Church, with its seat in the Old City of Jerusalem. It aims to promote Catholic faith and to support religious, cultural and social works of the Melkite Greek Catholic Church in the Holy Land, as well as to promote its Byzantine liturgy. Its current Grand Master is Patriarch Youssef Absi, and its Grand Prior is the Vicar Apostolic of Jerusalem.

The symbol of the order is a gold-edged cross with a red or blue interior. Its vertical inscription is ΦΩC ("light"), and its horizontal inscription is ΖΩΗ ("life"), together forming the order's motto in Greek: Φως και Ζωη (Fos kai Zoe), meaning "Light and life". Prominent feast days include Saint George's Day and the Feast of the Cross.

The Patriarchal Order of the Holy Cross of Jerusalem, while completely independent of the Holy See, is under "ecclesiastical patronage" sui iuris by the Melkite Catholic Patriarchate of Antioch and All the East in accordance with the Code of Canons of the Eastern Churches. As such, it is recognised as a legitimate ecclesiastical decoration by the International Commission on Orders of Chivalry. In addition, it is a registered charity in multiple countries.

== History ==
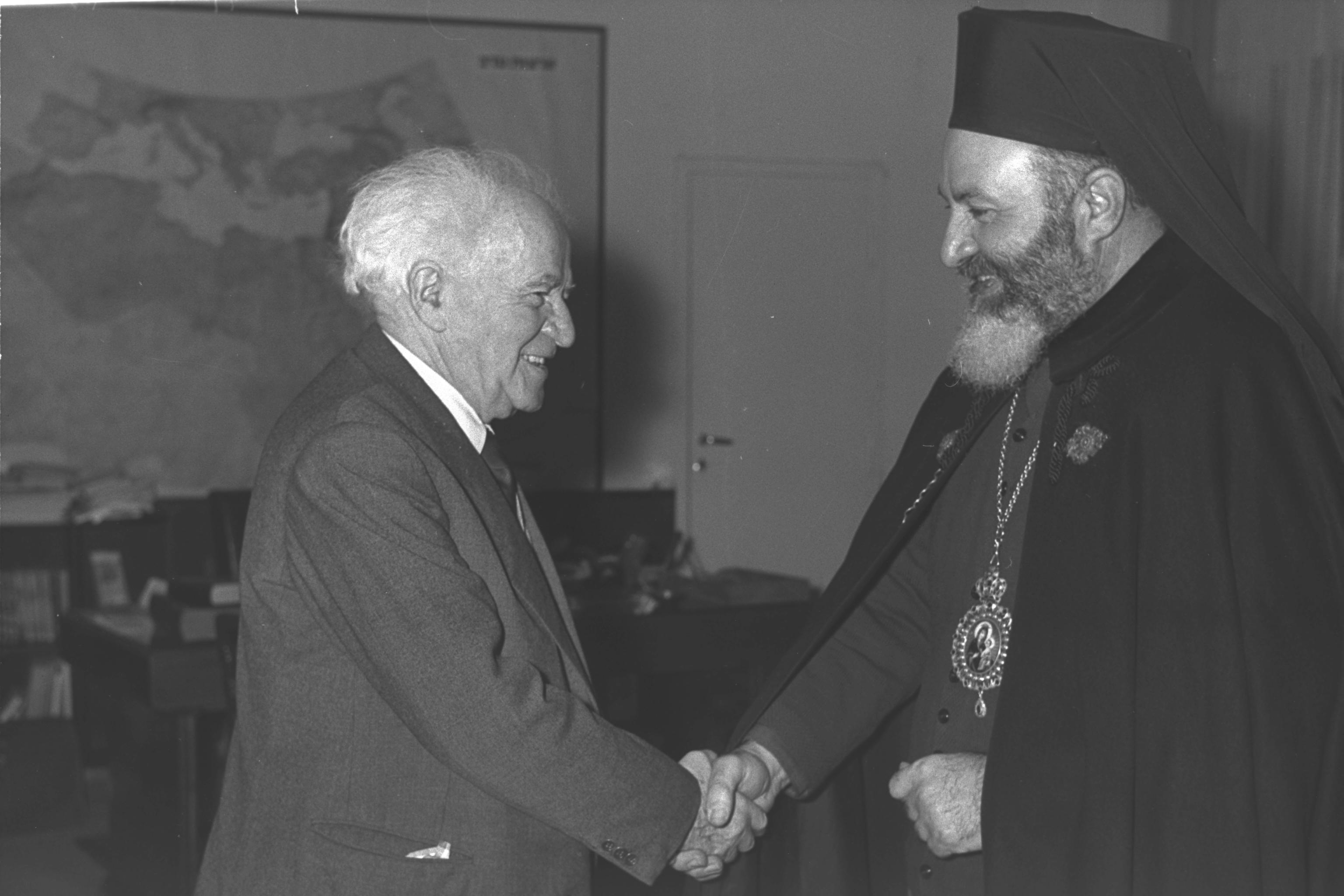
The founder of the order, Patriarch Maximos V Hakim (right), together with David Ben-Gurion, first Prime Minister of Israel, 1960.

The order was founded by Patriarch Maximos V Hakim of the Melkite Greek Catholic Church on 14 September 1979, originally based in Santa Maria in Cosmedin, Rome, Italy. Ever since, it has enjoyed the protection of the subsequent Patriarchs of the Melkite Greek Catholic Church as Grand Masters.

In 1997, new statutes were introduced and the seat was moved to Damascus, Syria.

== Organisation ==
[...] [T]o bring in the greatest measure possible, brotherly help to peoples living in The Holy Land and to the entire Christian East.

— MISSION of the Order, Province of the United States, Patriarchal Order of the Holy Cross of Jerusalem

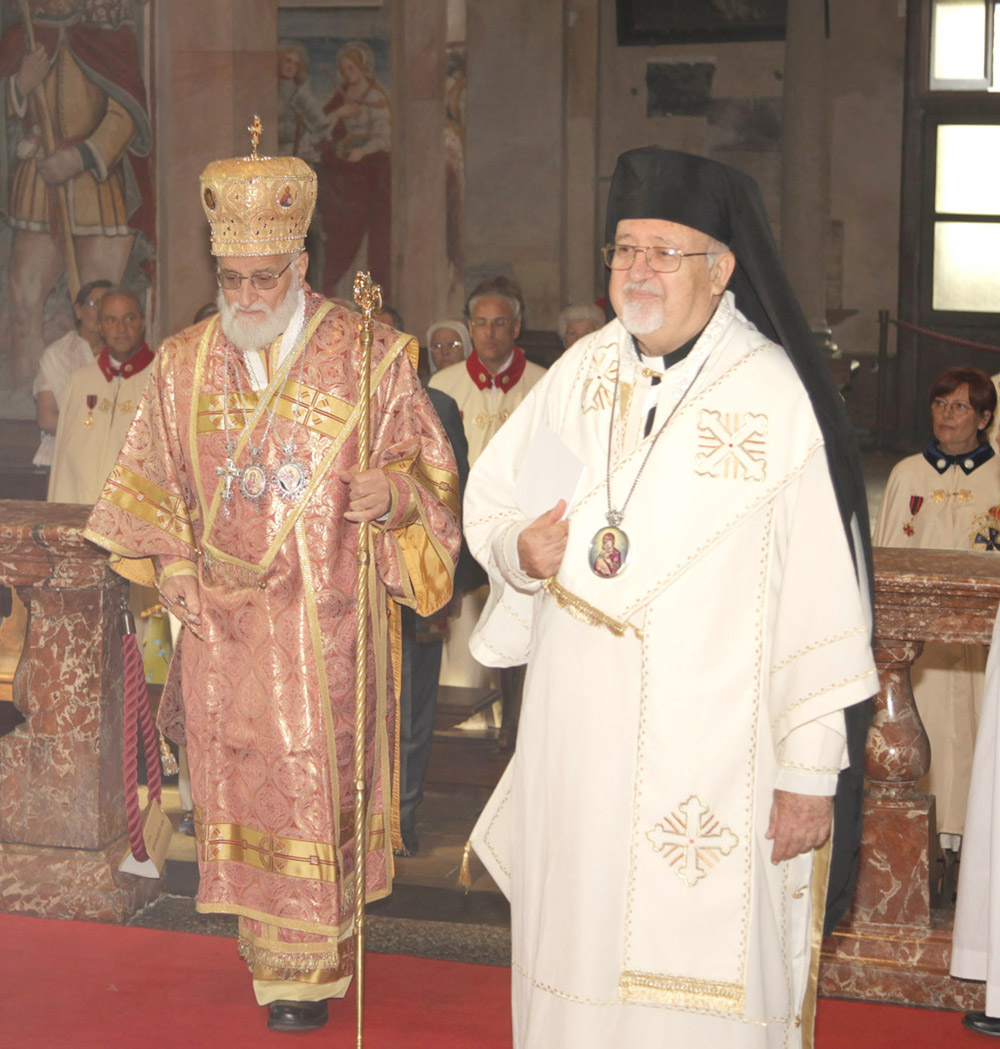
Former Grand Master Patriarch Gregory III Laham (left) with the former Grand Prior of the order, Archbishop Joseph Jules Zerey, Vicar Apostolic of Jerusalem, 2009.

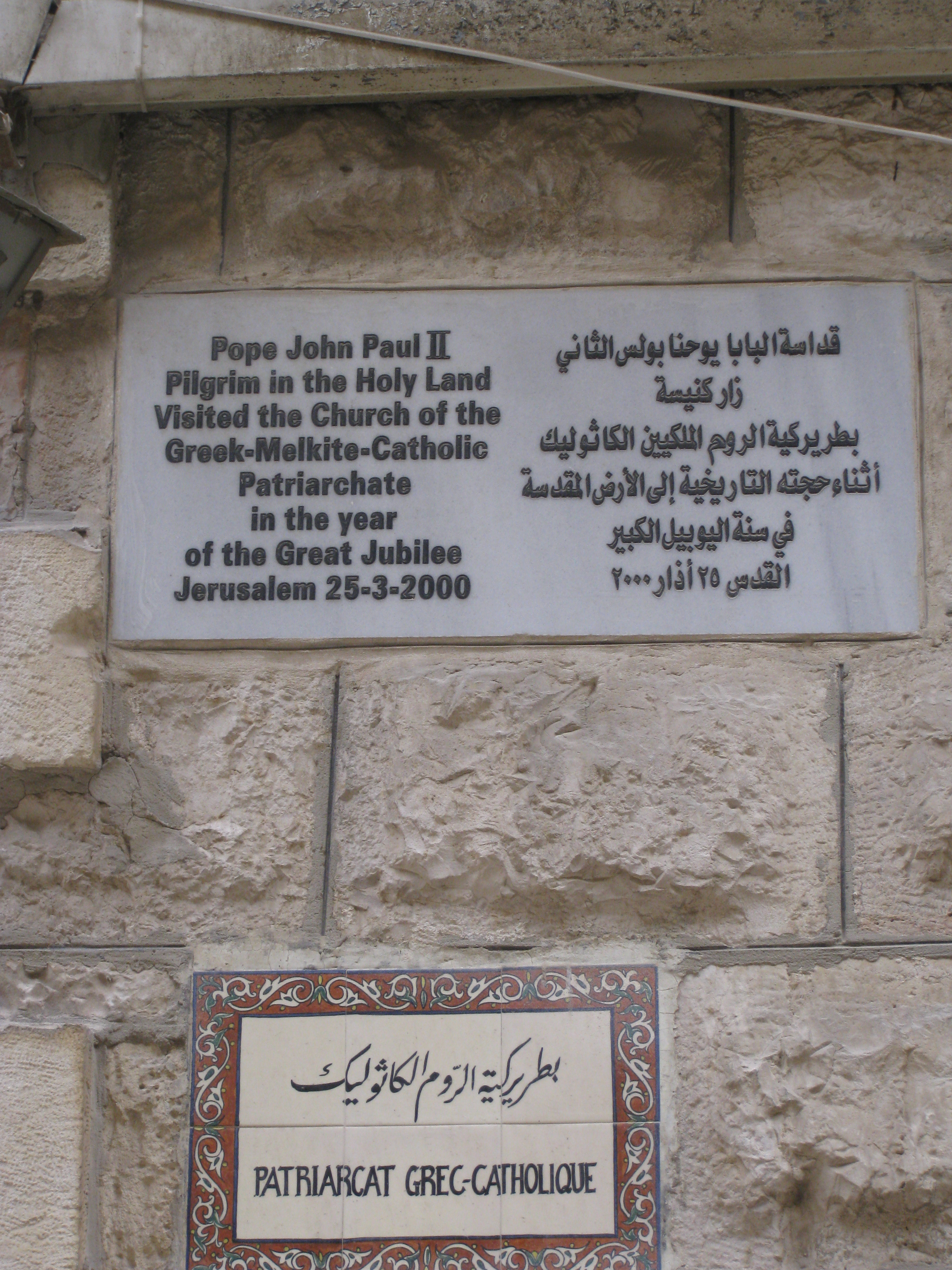
The seat of the Order, seat of the Melkite Greek Catholic Patriarchate of Jerusalem

Under the Melkite Catholic Patriarchate of Antioch and All the East as Grand Master, the order is organised by a Governor International and served by a Grand Prior, the Vicar Apostolic of Jerusalem. In consequence, local provinces are governed by Deputy Governors and served by Priors National.

The order has a seat in the Old City of Jerusalem, at the seat of the Melkite Patriarchate, yet the seat of the Grand Master is situated in Damascus, Syria, along with the seat of the Patriarch of the Melkite Greek Catholic Church.

Apart from the Middle East, the order is active in Italy (2006), Germany (1988), Belgium (1986), France (2014), United States and Canada. Among its charitable endeavours, in the United States, it runs a project called "Friend of the Holy Land" in support of Christians of the Holy Land.

=== Grades ===
- Knight or Dame Grand Cross
- Knight or Dame Grand Officer
- Knight or Dame Commander
- Knight or Dame

== Status ==
The Patriarchal Order of the Holy Cross of Jerusalem, while completely independent of the Holy See, is under "ecclesiastical patronage" sui iuris by the Melkite Catholic Patriarchate of Antioch and All the East in accordance with the Code of Canons of the Eastern Churches. As such, it is recognised as a legitimate ecclesiastical decoration by the International Commission on Orders of Chivalry. In addition, it is a registered charity in multiple countries, including Lebanon, Jordan, Egypt and Canada.

Although recognised as a legitimate ecclesiastical decoration, part of the order's terminology has been a subject of criticism by the ICOC:

It is to be clearly understood that the decorations listed below are not considered by the Commission to be Chivalric in nature even though several may use the term “Order” in their styles and imitate Chivalric titles. We invite these Authorities to use more proper terms for any future creations of awards. Nevertheless, the Commission accepts that these Ecclesiastical Decorations possess full validity as awards of merit or honours within the respective Churches which have instituted them.

— International Commission on Orders of Chivalry (2006)

== Gallery ==
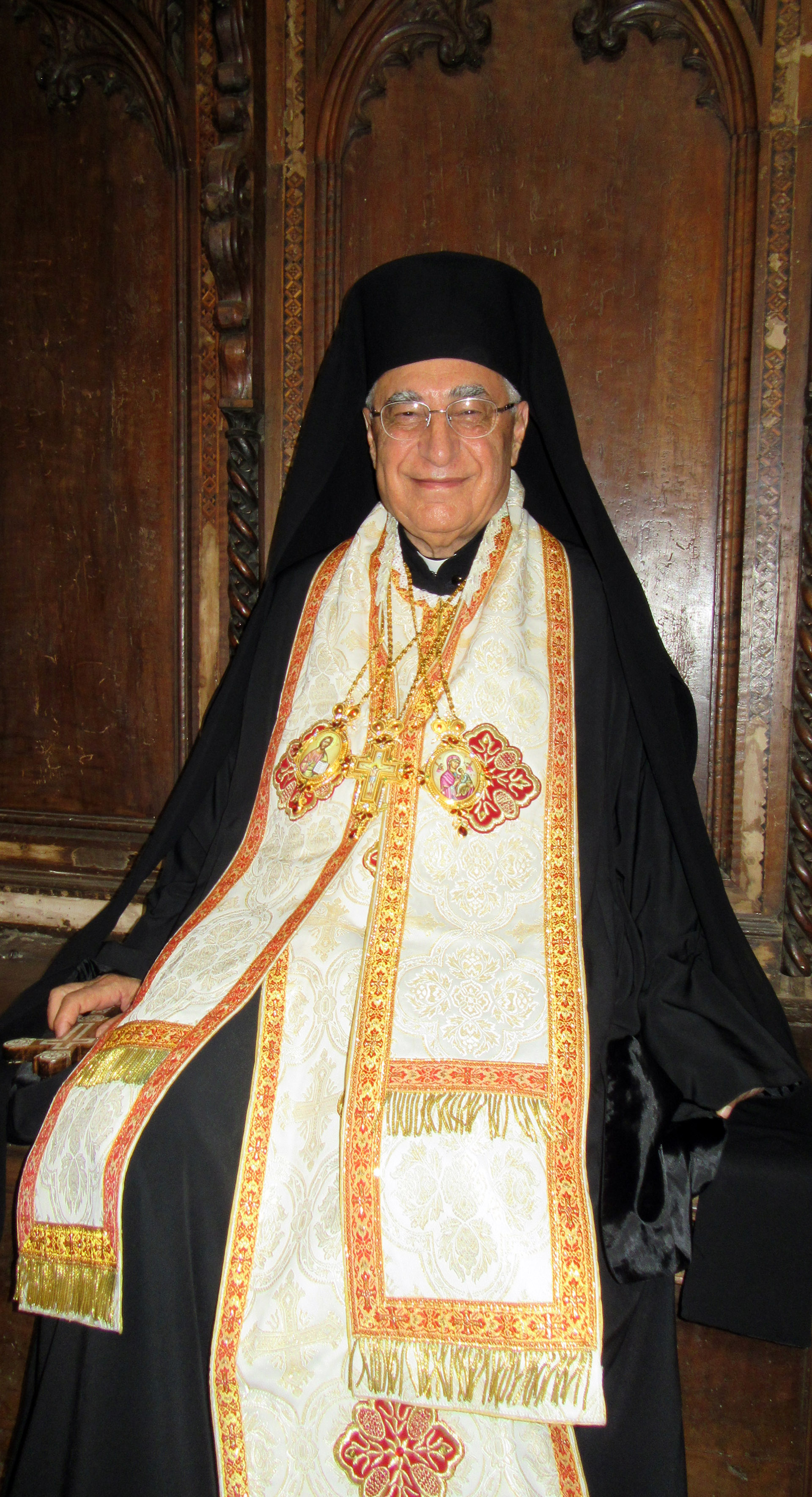
Patriarch Youssef Absi, Grand Master of the order, in June 2018.

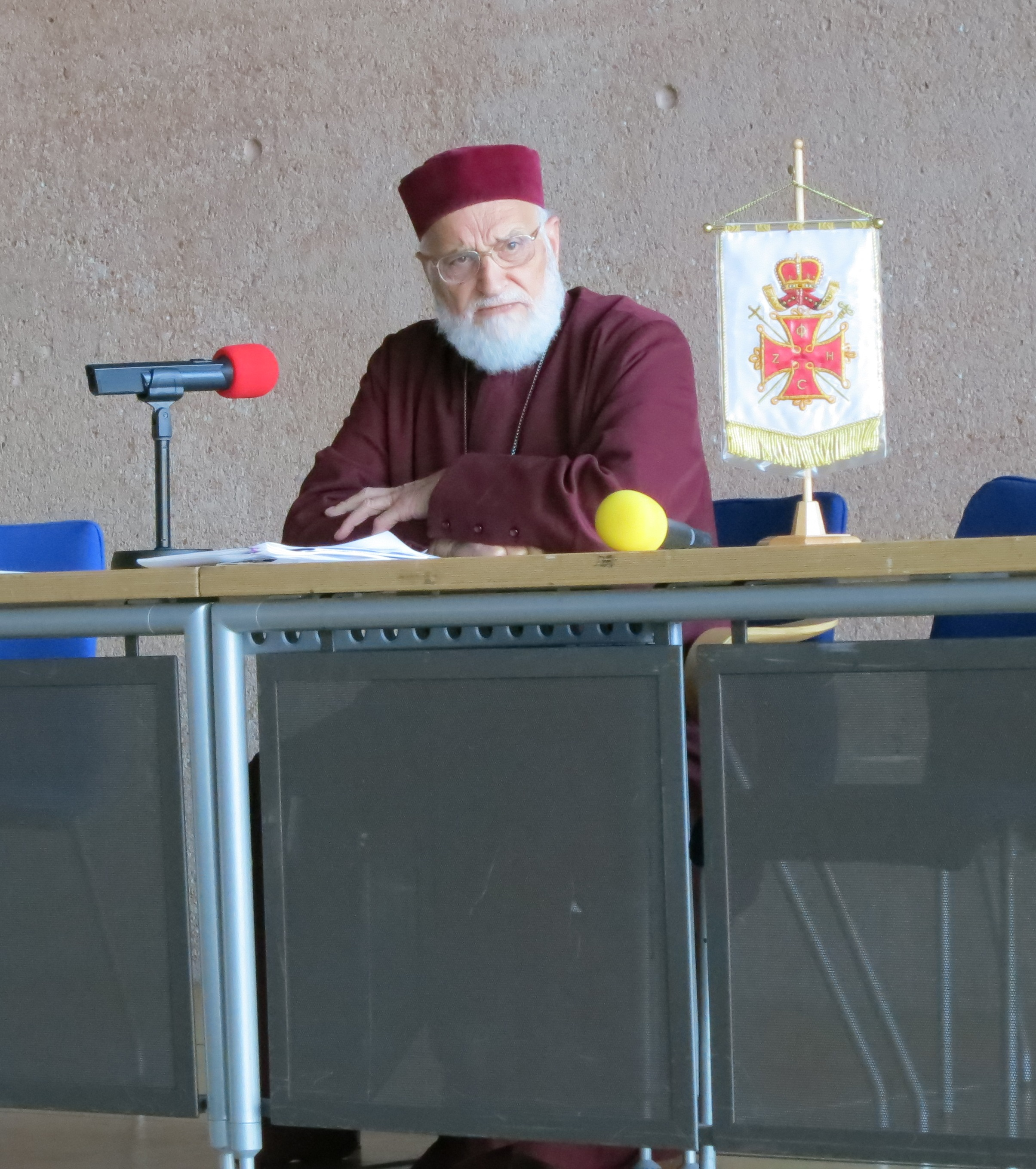
Former Patriarch Gregory III Laham in Trier, Germany, 2012.

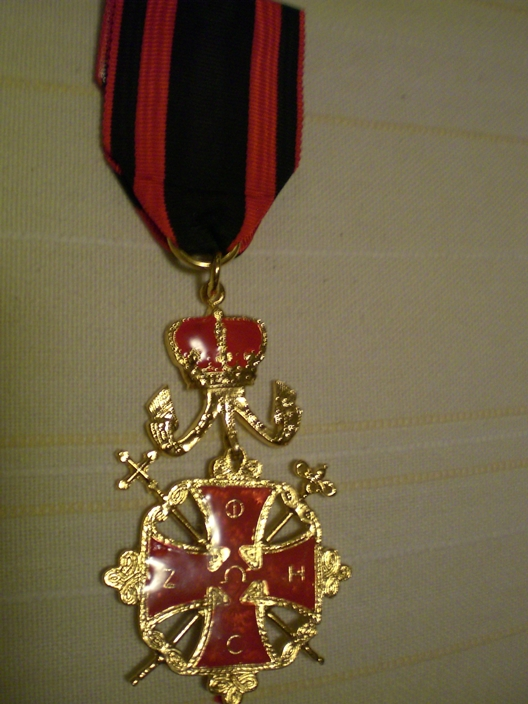
Frontside of the decoration for knights.

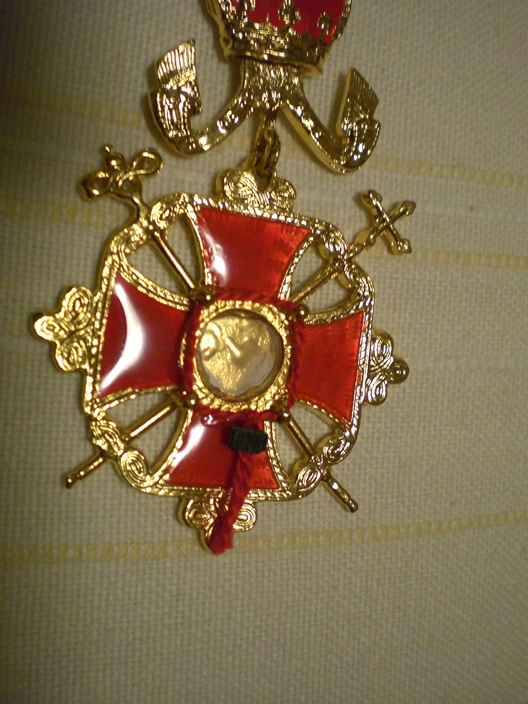
Backside: relic in shape of a rock from Calvary, including the seal of the Patriarch.

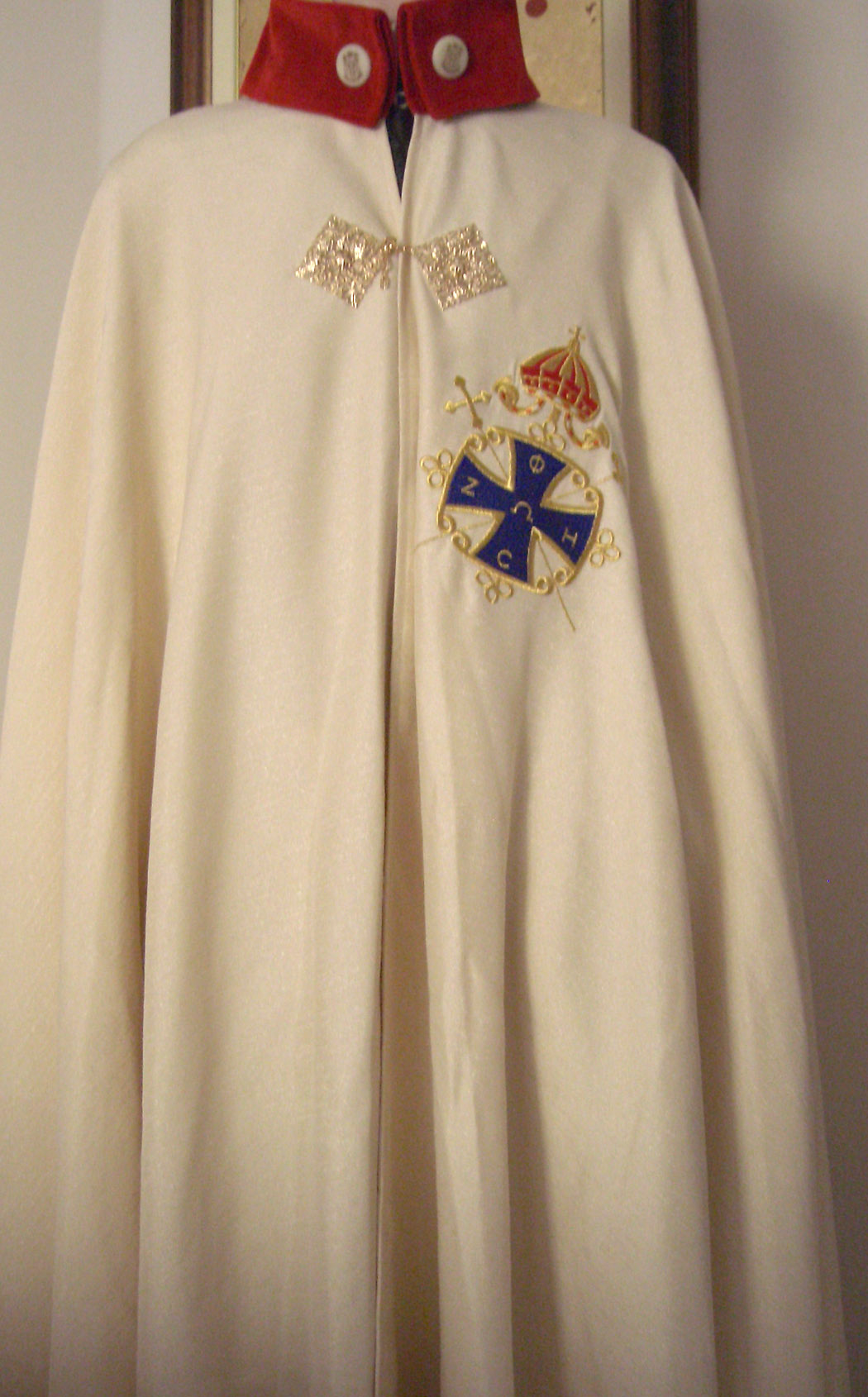
Ceremonial robe of the order in Italy.

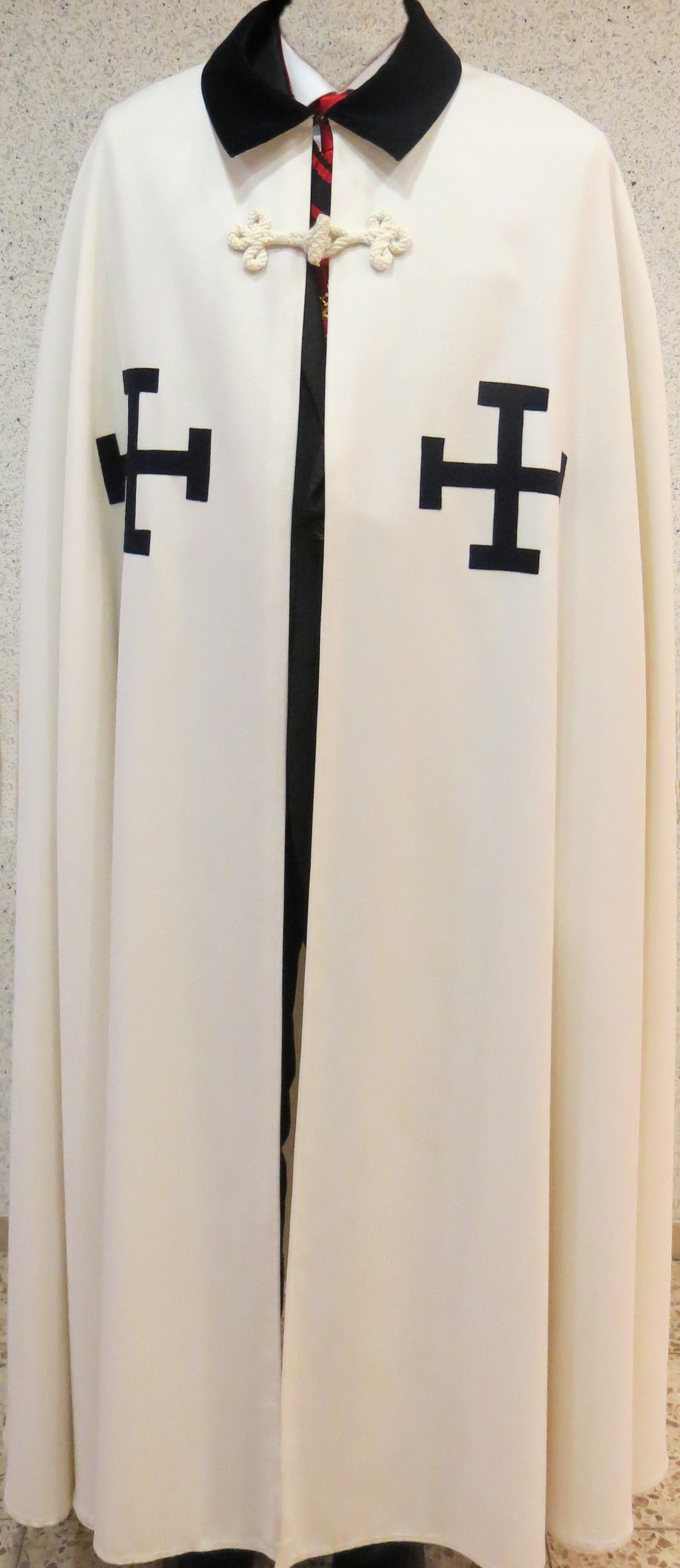
Ceremonial robe of the order in Germany.

== See also ==
- List of ecclesiastical decorations

== Bibliography ==
- AA.VV., Ordine patriarcale della Santa Croce di Gerusalemme. Luogotenenza della lingua italiana. Calendario storico per il 2007; Edisiòn Il Pomerio, Lod, 2006, ISBN 8871214498
- Guy Stair Sainty and Rafal Heydel-Mankoo, Burke's Peerage & Gentry: World Orders of Knighthood and Merit, vol. II pagg. 1969–1970, Burke's Peerage, 2006, ISBN 0-9711966-7-2
