= Melkite Patriarchal Dependent Territory of Egypt, Sudan, and South Sudan =

Eastern Catholic ecclesiastical jurisdiction in northeast Africa

Coordinates: 30.0850°N 31.2462°E

Patriarchal Dependent Territory of Egypt, Sudan, and South Sudan

Location
- Country: Egypt, Sudan and South Sudan
- Ecclesiastical province: Patriarchate of Antioch

Statistics
- Parishes: 14

Information
- Denomination: Melkite Greek Catholic Church
- Rite: Byzantine
- Established: 1835
- Cathedral: Resurrection cathedral, Cairo
- Co-cathedral: Dormition cathedral, Alexandria

Current leadership
- Pope: Leo XIV
- Patriarch: Youssef Absi
- Patriarchal Vicar: Jean-Marie Chami
- Bishops emeritus: Georges Bakar

The Melkite Patriarchal Dependent Territory of Egypt, Sudan, and South Sudan is the presence of the Melkite Greek Catholic Church in the Northern African countries of Egypt, Sudan, and South Sudan.

== Status ==
As a territory dependent on the patriarch it is a missionary pre-diocesan jurisdiction with an ordinary, so it is immediately subject to the Melkite Catholic Patriarch of Antioch in his capacity as Melkite Catholic Titular Patriarch of Alexandria, and is not part of his or any other ecclesiastical province.

As the titular patriarch of Alexandria, the Melkite Patriarch of Antioch appoints the patriarchal vicar to act on his behalf. The patriarchal vicar currently has the title of protosyncellus of Egypt, Sudan, and South Sudan and is made a titular archbishop, and an auxiliary bishop of Antioch.

== Territory and statistics ==
It supports the Melkite communities in Egypt, Sudan and South Sudan. The number of the faithful, who in 1940 was around 35,000 people, is much diminished. As per 2014, it pastorally served 6,200 Melkite Catholics in 14 parishes with 18 priests (diocesan), 2 deacons and 15 lay religious sisters.

It has two cathedrals, both in Egypt:

- the Resurrection cathedral in Cairo, its episcopal see.
- the Dormition cathedral in Alexandria, the Ancient see of the (here Titular) Patriarch.

== History ==
In 1772, as remembered by the Orientalium Dignitas of Pope Leo XIII, the Patriarch of Antioch became "Administrator of Alexandria" for the Melkites in Egypt. In 1838, the Melkite Patriarch assumed the title of Patriarch of Antioch and All the East, Alexandria and Jerusalem (being titular Patriarch of both latter sees). In 1835, the Melkite Church in Egypt and Sudan was called the Patriarchal Vicariate of Egypt and Sudan. In 1992, it was raised to become the Patriarchal Exarchate of Egypt and Sudan. In 1997, it became the Patriarchal Dependent Territory of Egypt and Sudan. In 2012, after the independence of South Sudan, it was renamed the Patriarchal Dependent Territory of Egypt, Sudan and South Sudan.

=== Patriarchal Vicars of Egypt, Sudan, and South Sudan ===
- Thomas Qoyoumgi, B.S. (1835 - 1836) – later Superior General of the Basilian Salvatorian Order in 1846.
- Basil Kfoury (1837 - died April 5, 1859
- Augustin Fattal, B. A. (1859 - 1864)
- Ambroise Basile Abdo (1864 - November 15, 1866 appointed prefect of Zahleh and Furzol)
- Joannitius Massamiri (1866 - 1870)
- Augustin Fattal, B. A. (1870 - 1876) (for the second time)
- Thomas Mazloum (1876 - 1879)
- Athanasios Nasser (1879 - October 24, 1902 deceased)
- Pierre-Macario Saba (November 29, 1903 - June 25, 1919 appointed Archeparch of Aleppo of the Melkites)
- Etienne Soukkarie (April 25, 1920 - November 25, 1921 deceased)
- Anthony Farage (1 January 1922 to 1928 resigned)
- Dionysius Kfoury, B.S. (1932 - 1954 resigned)
- Elias Zoghby (September 2, 1954 - September 9, 1968 appointed Archeparch of Baalbek of the Melkites)
- Paul Antaki (9 September 1968 - June 22, 2001 resigned)
- Joseph Jules Zerey (22 June 2001 - June 4, 2008 appointed Patriarchal Vicar of Jerusalem of the Melkites)
- Georges Bakar, (4 June 2008 – 25 June 2022), previously Protosyncellus of Jerusalem of the Melkites
- Jean-Marie Chami (since 25 June 2022)
