= Kafoury =

Kafoury is a surname. It may refer to:

- Deborah Kafoury (born 1967), American politician in state of Oregon
- Gretchen Kafoury (1942–2015), American politician, member of the Oregon House of Representatives
- Stephen Kafoury (born 1941), American politician in state of Oregon

== See also ==
- Kfoury
- Kafouri
