= Yasser Ayyash =

Jordanian archbishop

- Protosyncellus of Patriarchal Dependent Territory of Jerusalem
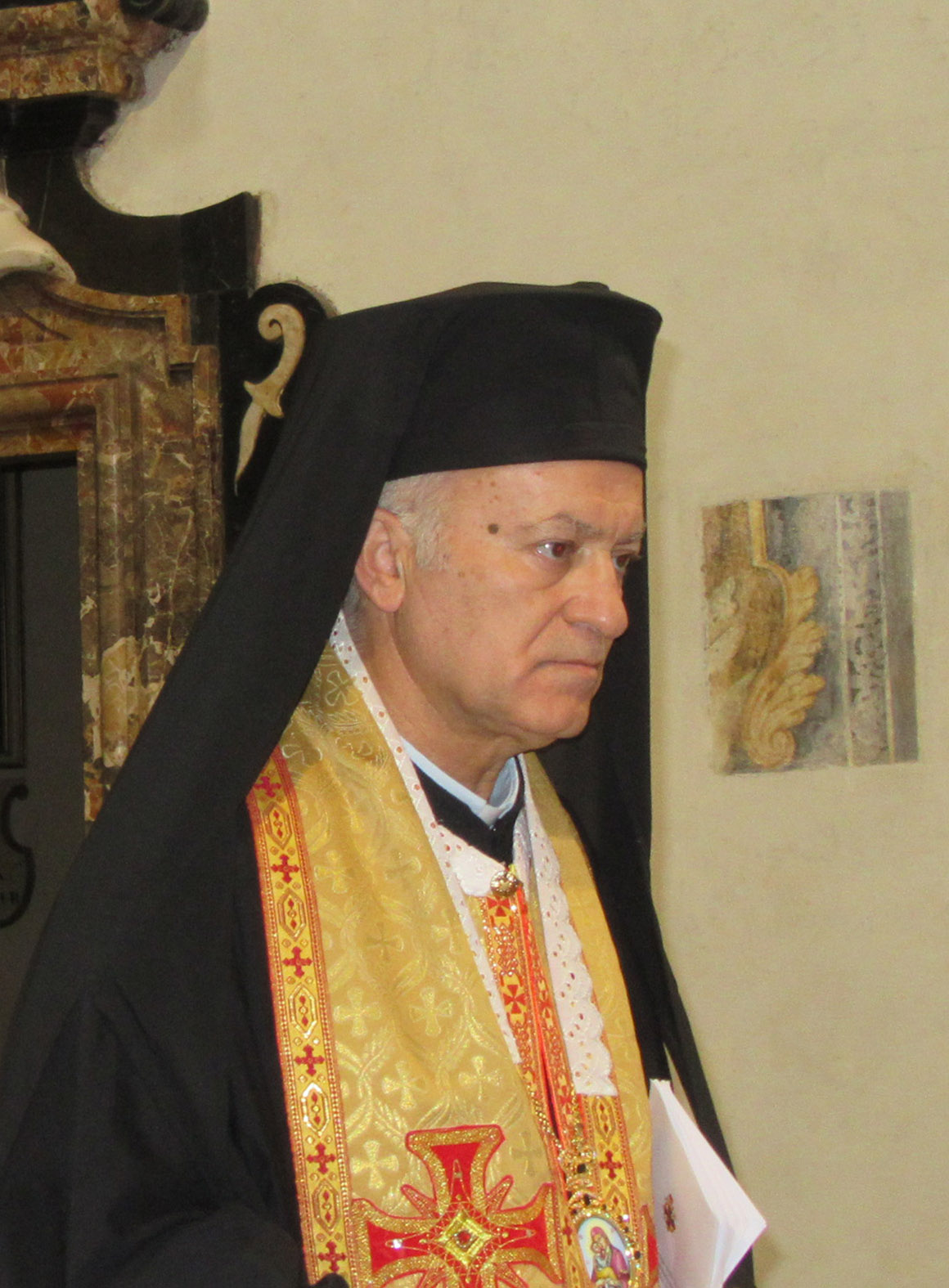
- Native name: ياسر عياش
- See: Jerusalem
- Appointed: 9 February 2018
- Predecessor: Joseph Jules Zerey
- Previous posts: Archbishop of Petra and Philadelphia (2007-2015)

Orders
- Ordination: 12 July 1987
- Consecration: 13 October 2007 by Gregory III Laham

Personal details
- Born: 4 December 1955 (age 70) Shatana, Irbid Governorate, Jordan
- Denomination: Melkite Greek Catholic Church

Yasser Rasmi Hanna Ayyash (Arabic: ياسر رسمي حنا عياش; born 4 December 1955) is a Jordanian-born Melkite Catholic hierarch, who has served as protosyncellus of Patriarchal Dependent Territory of Jerusalem since 2018 and previously served as an archbishop of the Melkite Greek Catholic Archeparchy of Petra and Philadelphia in Amman since 2007 until 2015.

== Early life and priesthood ==
Yasser Ayyash was born in Shatana, Irbid Governorate on 4 December 1955 and attended the school of Greek Catholics in his Shatana hometown. Later he continued his education in Beit Sahour and Bethlehem, where he obtained his baccalaureate degree. Ayyash studied theology and biblical studies in Lebanon, he finished studying in Rome with the completion of a bachelor's degree in philosophy and theology at the Pontifical University of Saint Thomas Aquinas in Rome. In 1983 he was ordained a deacon in Rome, and to the priesthood on 12 July 1987 in Amman. It was followed by an extended use in parishes and schools in the capital Amman and Jerash.

== Archeparch ==
The Melkite Synod in 2007 elected on 21 June 2007 Yasser Ayyash as Archbishop of Petra and Philadelphia, becoming himself the first native Jordanian in this archeparchy and successor of the Lebanese Georges El-Murr. The episcopal ordination was on 13 October 2007, and was performed by Melkite Patriarch of Antioch Gregory III Laham, BS, and the co-consecrators were Archbishop Georges El-Murr, BC of Petra and Philadelphia and Bishop Joseph Absi, SMSP, auxiliary bishop in the Patriarchate of Antioch. In October 2010, Ayyash participated in the Special Assembly of the Synod of Bishops in Rome as delegated Bishop of the Melkites of Jordan. About the situation of the Church in the Middle East, he emphasized the relatively good position of the Eastern Churches in Jordan and explained that in Jordan churches, schools and other facilities could be built. Ayyash regretted the emigration of many Christians and called for a deepening of interreligious dialogue in the Middle East.

Ayyash renounced to his office as Melkite Archeparchy of Petra and Philadelphia on April 14, 2015.

On 9 February 2018, Ayyash was elected as protosyncellus of Patriarchal Dependent Territory of Jerusalem by the Melkite Synod. He succeeded Archbishop Joseph Jules Zerey.
