= Khanh Pham =

American politician (born 1978)

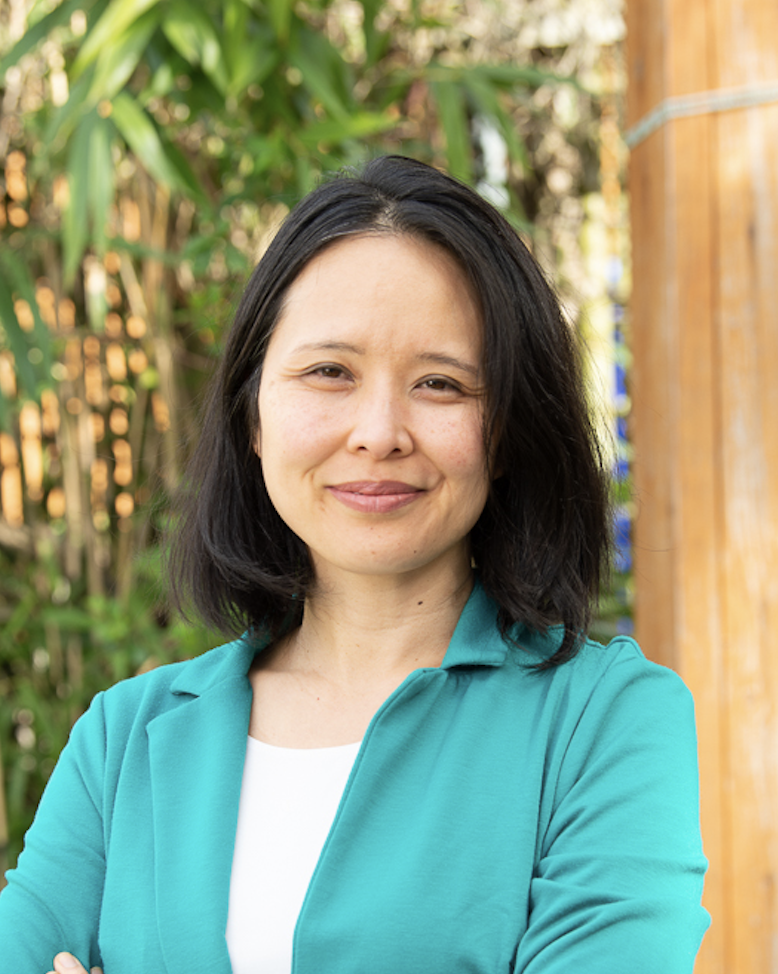

Member of the Oregon Senate from the 23rd district
- Incumbent
- Assumed office January 13, 2025
- Preceded by: Michael Dembrow

Member of the Oregon House of Representatives from the 46th district
- In office January 11, 2021 – January 13, 2025
- Preceded by: Alissa Keny-Guyer
- Succeeded by: Willy Chotzen

Personal details
- Born: 1978 (age 47–48) Oklahoma City, Oklahoma, U.S.
- Party: Democratic
- Children: 1
- Education: Lewis & Clark College (BA); Portland State University (MA)

Khanh Pham (born 1978) is an American politician and activist currently serving as a member of the Oregon State Senate, representing the 23rd district since 2025. A member of the Democratic Party, she was the first Vietnamese American to serve in the Oregon Legislature, first elected to the Oregon House of Representatives in 2020, and the state's first Vietnamese American state senator.

The Oregon Capital Chronicle described Pham as "long one of the most progressive members of the state House" when she moved to the Senate.

== Early life and education ==
The daughter of refugees from Saigon, Vietnam, Pham was born in Oklahoma City, Oklahoma. When she was 11, Pham moved to Irvine, California with her family. In 2001, she earned a Bachelor's degree from Lewis & Clark College, studying Sociology/Anthropology, and Political Economy. She later earned a Master's degree in Urban Studies from Portland State University.

== Career ==
=== Early career ===
From 2015 to 2020, she worked as a community organizer on environmental justice and climate justice at Asian Pacific American Network of Oregon and at OPAL Environmental Justice Oregon, and helped launch the Oregon Just Transition Alliance.

Pham was a leader of the coalition that campaigned for Portland Measure 26-201, the Portland Clean Energy Community Benefits Initiative, which voters approved in November 2018. The measure imposes a 1% surcharge on Portland retail sales by large retailers and directs revenue to a fund for clean energy, energy efficiency, and job training projects. The fund has generated hundreds of millions of dollars, exceeding initial projections. The program has since been the subject of a 2022 city audit and of proposals to redirect some of its revenue to other city priorities.

=== Oregon House of Representatives ===
After incumbent Democrat Alissa Keny-Guyer announced that she would not seek re-election in the 2020 election, Pham announced her candidacy to succeed her. Pham won the Democratic primary, defeating former County Commissioner Jeff Cogen. In the November 2020 general election, she did not face a Republican challenger. Pham assumed office on January 11, 2021, making her the first Vietnamese American elected to the Oregon Legislature.

In the 2021 session, Pham was a chief sponsor with, Representative Pam Marsh, of House Bill 2021, which requires Oregon's retail electricity providers to reduce greenhouse gas emissions from the electricity they sell to 80% below baseline levels by 2030, 90% by 2035, and 100% by 2040.

Pham and then-House Speaker Tina Kotek led a group of nine Democratic legislators who requested $80 million in state funding for safety improvements on 82nd Avenue. The Legislature approved the money, which was part of a $185 million package with the Oregon Department of Transportation and the Portland Bureau of Transportation to transfer ownership of the road from the state to the city.

Following the 2021 Taliban offensive, Pham was chosen to co-lead a task force alongside representative Kayse Jama to coordinate the resettlement of 1,200 refugees from Afghanistan in Oregon.

Pham was reelected in the 2022 Oregon House of Representatives election.

In 2023, Pham sponsored House Bill 2605, which would have funded a local journalism resource center and grants to news organizations. The bill did not advance out of committee.

In 2023, Pham and Marsh were the chief sponsors of House Bill 2004, which referred a ranked-choice voting measure to the 2024 ballot. The measure would have used ranked-choice voting in primary and general elections for federal and statewide offices beginning in 2028. Voters rejected the measure in November 2024, with nearly 60% opposed.

=== Oregon Senate ===
In September 2023, Pham announced she would run for the Oregon Senate in the 23rd district, a seat being vacated by the retiring Michael Dembrow.

In 2025, Pham carried Senate Bill 686, which would have required large online platforms to pay Oregon news outlets and created a consortium to award grants for local journalism. The bill failed on the Senate floor.

In March 2026, Pham voted against Senate Bill 1501, which authorized up to $365 million in state financing toward renovation of the Moda Center. In a written explanation, she said the benefits of a public subsidy for the arena had to be weighed against the cost of not investing in housing, education, and other public needs.

Since 2025, Pham has been one of the two assistant majority leaders in the Senate Democratic caucus. As of November 2026, Pham chairs the Senate Committee on Housing and Development and co-chairs the Joint Committee on Transportation Oversight and the Joint Committee on Information Management and Technology. She also serves on the Senate committees on Energy and Environment, Transportation, and Commerce and General Government.

== Personal life ==
Pham and her husband have one daughter. She and her family live in the Jade District of Portland, Oregon.

== Electoral history ==
2024 Oregon State Senator, 23rd district
| Party | Candidate | Votes | % |
|---|---|---|---|
| Democratic | Khanh Pham | 54,001 | 97.5 |
| Write-in | | 1,372 | 2.5 |
| Total votes | | 55,373 | 100% |

23rd district Democratic primary, 2024
| Party | Candidate | Votes | % |
|---|---|---|---|
| Democratic | Khanh Pham | 18,230 | 98.9 |
| Write-in | | 210 | 1.1 |
| Total votes | | 18,440 | 100% |

2022 Oregon State Representative, 46th district
| Party | Candidate | Votes | % |
|---|---|---|---|
| Democratic | Khanh Pham | 24,289 | 83.8 |
| Republican | Timothy R Sytsma | 4,658 | 16.1 |
| Write-in | | 44 | 0.2 |
| Total votes | | 28,991 | 100% |

46th district Democratic primary, 2022
| Party | Candidate | Votes | % |
|---|---|---|---|
| Democratic | Khanh Pham (incumbent) | 8,424 | 99.28 |
| Write-in | | 61 | 0.72 |
| Total votes | | 8,485 | 100% |

2020 Oregon State Representative, 46th district
| Party | Candidate | Votes | % |
|---|---|---|---|
| Democratic | Khanh Pham | 30,155 | 97.6 |
| Write-in | | 731 | 2.4 |
| Total votes | | 30,886 | 100% |
