= Joseph Jules Zerey =

Egyptian-born Melkite Catholic hierarch (1941–2026)

The Most Reverend Joseph Jules Zerey
- Vicar Apostolic of Jerusalem
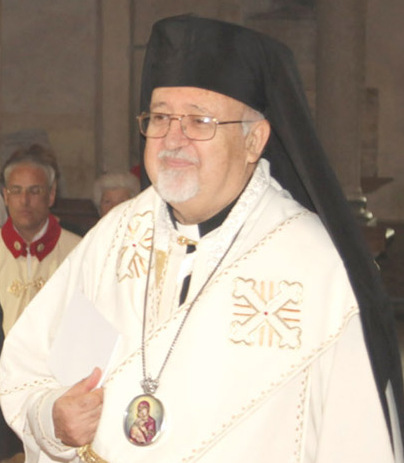
- Zerey in 2009
- Church: Melkite Greek Catholic Church
- See: Jerusalem
- Appointed: 4 June 2008
- Term ended: 9 February 2018
- Predecessor: Georges Michel Bakar
- Successor: Yasser Ayyash
- Other post: Titular Archbishop of Damiata dei Greco-Melkiti (2001–2026)
- Previous post: Auxiliary Bishop of Antioch (2001–2008)

Orders
- Ordination: 5 May 1967
- Consecration: 9 November 2001 by Gregory III Laham

Personal details
- Born: 9 June 1941 Alexandria, Egypt
- Died: 8 July 2026 (aged 85) Jerusalem, Israel
- Denomination: Catholicism

Joseph Jules Zerey (Arabic: چوزيف جول زيرى; 9 June 1941 – 8 July 2026) was an Egyptian-born Melkite Greek Catholic hierarch who served as a protosyncellus of Egypt, Sudan and South Sudan (2001–2008) and Jerusalem (2008–2018) with the title of a titular archbishop of Damiata (2001–2026).

== Biography ==
Zerey was ordained a priest on 5 May 1967 and started to serve at the Patriarchal College School in Cairo in 1967. In 1972 he was appointed director of the Patriarchal College School in Heliopolis. He was a patron of the Church of St. Joseph in Al Zaytoon-Cairo from 1985 to 2001, and president of the second-degree spiritual Court.

On 22 June 2001, he was appointed titular Archbishop of Damietta and Auxiliary Bishop of Antioch. He was consecrated bishop on 9 November 2001 by Patriarch Gregory III Laham, assisted by co-consecrators Archbishops Elias Zoghby and Paul Antaki. On 22 June 2001 Zerey was appointed Patriarchal Vicar of Alexandria and protosyncellus for the Melkite Church in Egypt and Sudan.

On 4 June 2008, Zerey was appointed Vicar Apostolic of Jerusalem. During 2010 Zerey was a participant in the Synod of Bishops for the Middle East in Rome. At the synod he published an intervention discussing the need to re-evangelize Christians living in the Holy Land and announcing the creation of a new international center for family spirituality in Nazareth.

On 9 February 2018, Zerey was replaced as protosyncellus of Jerusalem by the Melkite Synod, due to his age. He was succeeded by Archbishop Yasser Ayyash.

Zarey died in Jerusalem on 8 July 2026, at the age of 85.

== Distinctions ==
- Grand Prior of the Patriarchal Order of the Holy Cross of Jerusalem

== Gallery ==
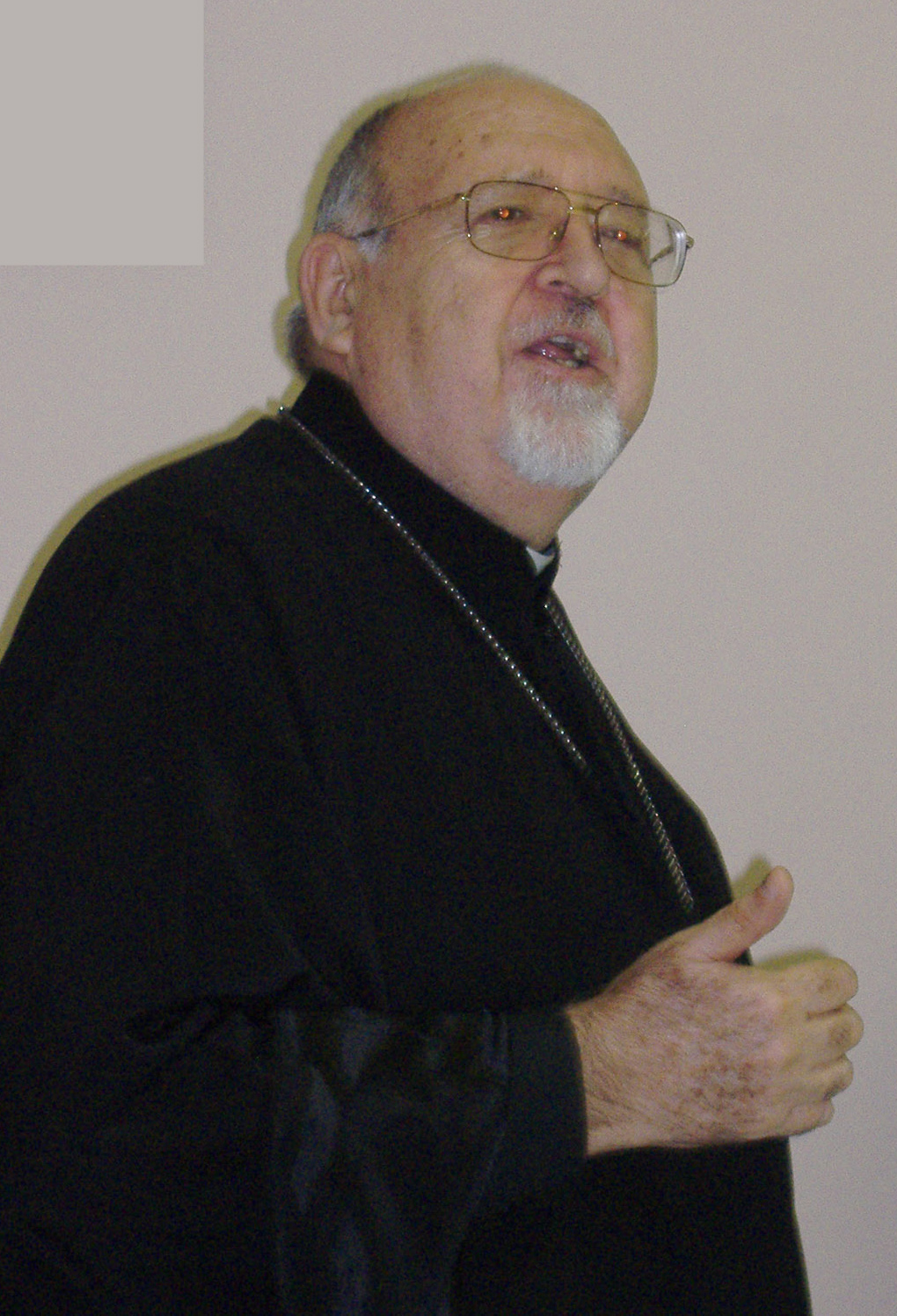
Archbishop Zerey in Caravaggio, Italy, September 2008.

== Notes ==
Catholic Church titles
Preceded by Georges Michel Bakar	Vicar Apostolic of Jerusalem; 2008–2018	Succeeded by Yasser Ayyash
Preceded by Paul Antaki	Auxiliary Bishop of Antioch; 2001–2008	Succeeded by Georges Michel Bakar
Preceded by Nicolas Hajj	Titular Archbishop of Damiata dei Greco-Melkiti; 2001–2026	Succeeded by Vacant
