= Paul Antaki =

- Protosynchellus of Egypt and Sudan
- Native name: بول انطاكى
- Church: Melkite Greek Catholic Church
- See: Patriarchal Dependent Territory of Egypt and Sudan
- In office: 9 September 1968 – 21 June 2001
- Predecessor: Elias Zoghby
- Successor: Joseph Jules Zerey
- Other posts: Auxiliary Eparch of Antioch (1998-2011); Titular Archeparch of Nubia (1968-2011)

Orders
- Ordination: 2 July 1950
- Consecration: 1 December 1968 by Maximos V Hakim

Personal details
- Born: 16 January 1927 Cairo, Kingdom of Egypt
- Died: 29 December 2011 (aged 84)

Paul Antaki (born 16 January 1927, in Cairo; died 29 December 2011) is the Melkite Greek Catholic titular archeparch of Nubia and auxiliary bishop.

== Biography ==
Archbishop Paul Antaki was born in Cairo on 16 January 1927. Having obtained both French and Egyptian baccalaureates, he studied theology at the Seminary of St. Anne of Jerusalem from 1946 to 1951. Ordained on 2 July 1950, he was appointed parish priest in Alexandria from 1951 to 1954, then Superior of the Patriarchal College in Cairo, 1954-1957, Secretary of the Patriarchate of Alexandria from 1957 to 1960 and Vicar of Alexandria from 1960 to 1966. In 1966 he was appointed Superior of the Minor Seminary of Rayak, a position he held until his episcopal ordination.

On 9 September 1968, he was appointed Titular Archbishop of Nubia and appointed auxiliary bishop in the Melkite Patriarchate of Antioch. The consecration took place on 1 December 1968 in the Cathedral of Beirut. His Consecrator was the patriarch of Antioch, Archbishop Maximos V Hakim. Co-consecrators were the Archbishops Elias Zoghby and Joseph Tawil. From 1968 to 2002 Antaki was also Patriarchal Vicar of Alexandria and then from 1991 to 2002 Patriarchal Exarch of Alexandria in Egypt and Sudan. In 1997 he was appointed to the Patriarch of Antioch and Syncellus. On 21 June 2001, by Pope John Paul II, when his age-related withdrawal from the episcopate was accepted.

He was a member of the Episcopal Conference of Egypt and chairman of the Youth Commission. During his tenure as auxiliary bishop he consecrated in 1973 Georges Bakar a priest and was at his episcopal ordination as Titular Archbishop of Pelusium of Greek Melkites (Apostolic Exarch of Jerusalem). He was also co-consecrator of his successor as Patriarchal Vicar of Alexandria Joseph Jules Zerey who is Titular Archbishop of Damietta of Greek Melkites (Auxiliary Bishop of Antioch).

He served as Protosyncellus and Patriarchal Exarch of the Melkite Patriarch in Egypt and the Sudan from 9 September 1968 to 22 June 2001.
