= Jeff Cogen =

American politician

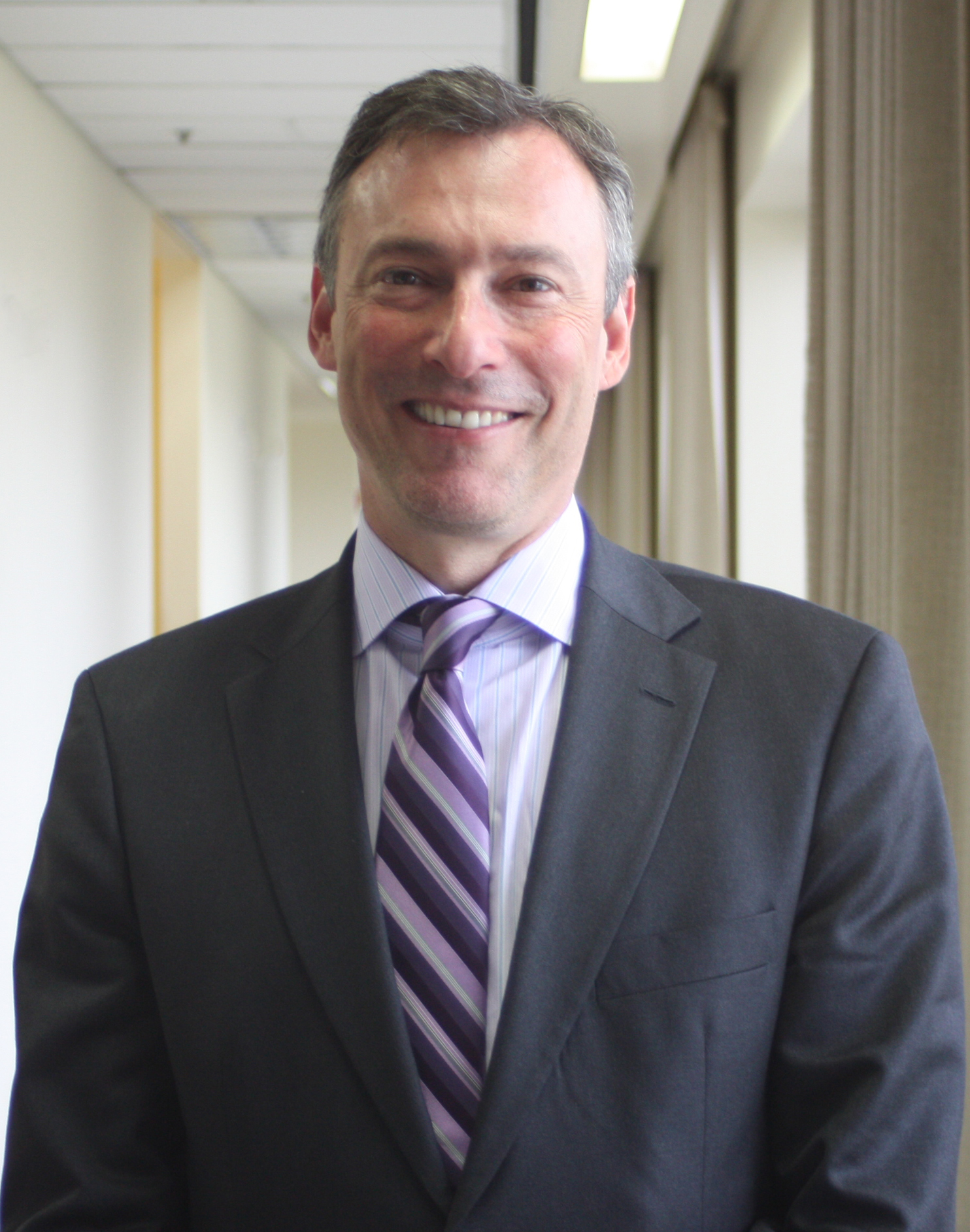
- Cogen in 2012

Chairman of the Multnomah County Board of Commissioners
- In office April 2010 – September 2013
- Preceded by: Jana McLellan (interim)
- Succeeded by: Marissa Madrigal

Member of the Multnomah County Board of Commissioners from the 2nd District
- In office 2006–2010
- Preceded by: Serena Cruz
- Succeeded by: Loretta Smith

Personal details
- Born: Jeffrey Scott Cogen; January 14, 1962 (age 64) Germany
- Party: Democratic
- Education: Brown University (BA); University of California, Los Angeles (JD)
- Profession: Lawyer, businessman, politician

Jeffrey Scott Cogen (born January 14, 1962) is an American businessman, lawyer, and former politician in the U.S. state of Oregon. He served as chairman of the Multnomah County Board of Commissioners from 2010 to 2013. From 2016 to 2019, he was Executive Director of Impact NW, a social service and anti-poverty organization headquartered in Portland, Oregon.

== Early life and career ==
Jeff Cogen was born on an American military base in Germany and grew up in Miami, Florida, with his parents and brother. In high school, Cogen was a member of the debate team and earned the title of Top Individual Speaker at the Florida State Debate Championship. Cogen attended Brown University, where he received a B.A. degree in Political Science. He then earned a J.D. degree from the University of California, Los Angeles.

Cogen practiced law for four years in San Francisco, California, before relocating to Portland, Oregon, with his wife, Lisa, in 1992. In Portland, they co-founded the city's first certified organic bakery, the Portland Pretzel Company. Cogen served as president of the business, which grew to employ a dozen people by early 1996.

== Political career ==
Cogen served as communications director for the Multnomah Commission on Children and Families. He later joined the board for Hands on Greater Portland, a nonprofit coordinating local volunteer initiatives, and was elected board president.

Cogen entered Portland politics in 1999 when he joined the staff of former Multnomah County Chair Beverly Stein. He subsequently moved to Portland city hall, and in 2003 he was named chief of staff to Portland City Commissioner Dan Saltzman. In 2006, Cogen was elected to the Multnomah County Board of Commissioners as Commissioner for District 2, representing North and Northeast Portland.

In March 2010, Multnomah County Chair Ted Wheeler resigned from the Board of County Commissioners following his appointment as Oregon State Treasurer after the death of incumbent Ben Westlund. The board selected Cogen as Multnomah County Chair, effective April 1, to complete the remainder of Wheeler's term. In May 2010, Cogen was elected to a full four-year term as Multnomah County Chair, taking office on January 6, 2011.

=== Projects and initiatives ===
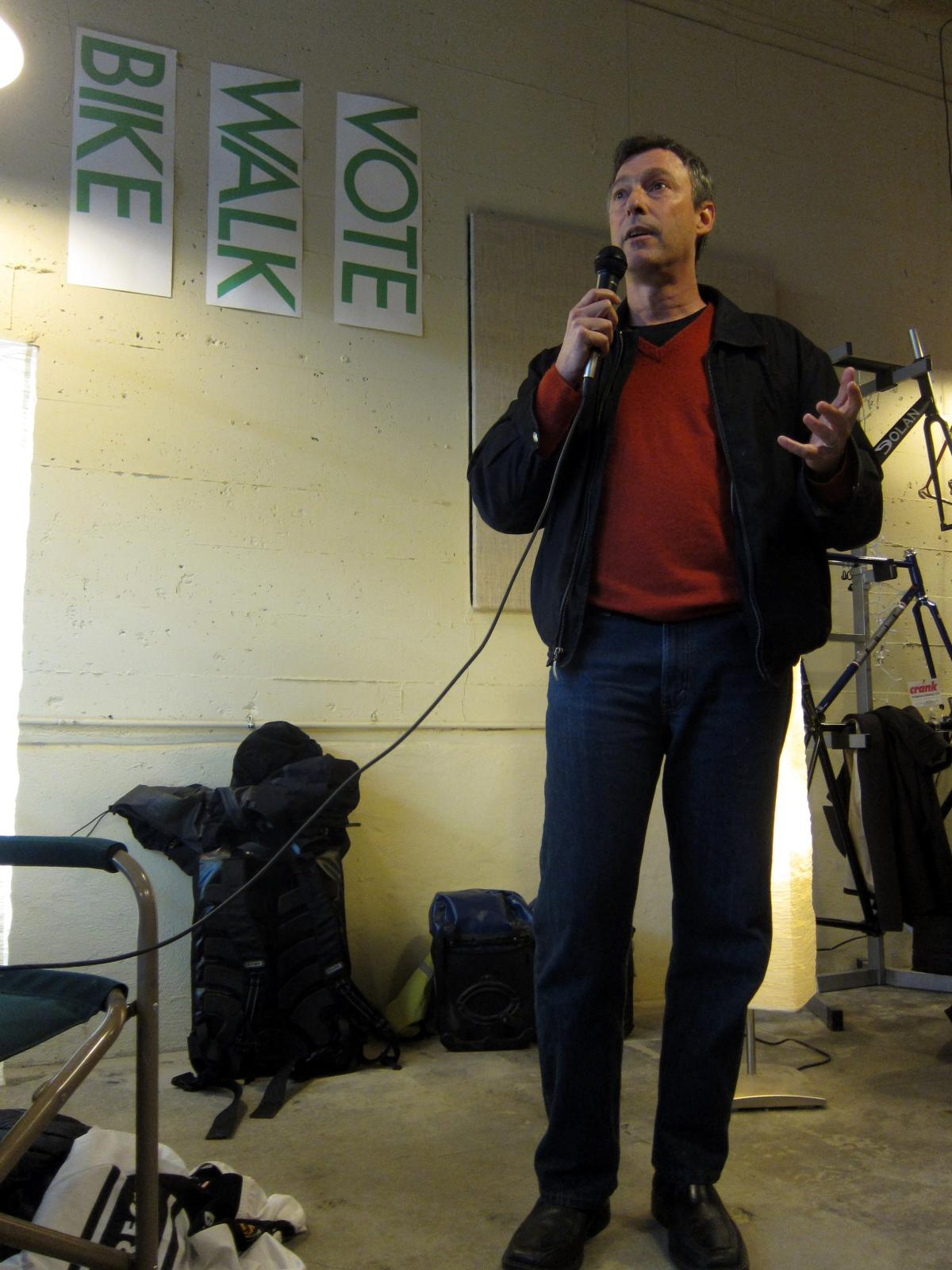
Cogen in 2011

During his tenure on the Multnomah County Board of Commissioners, Cogen focused on public health, social services, and county infrastructure.

In 2009, Cogen's office launched the Multnomah County CROPS Farm, converting surplus county property in Troutdale, Oregon, into a two-acre farm to grow produce for the Oregon Food Bank. The following year, the county and the City of Portland partnered to open the Gateway Center for Domestic Violence Services, providing centralized legal, law enforcement, and counseling resources for survivors. By early 2013, the center's caseload had grown from roughly 2,000 women served in its first year to about 3,000 in its second; that February, Cogen joined U.S. Senator Jeff Merkley and other local officials at the center to urge the U.S. House of Representatives to reauthorize the federal Violence Against Women Act after the Senate passed its version by a bipartisan 78–22 vote. In 2011, Cogen coordinated with city and state agencies, alongside Central City Concern, to open a 16-bed Mental Health Crisis Assessment and Treatment Center in Northeast Portland to serve low-income and homeless individuals.

Cogen advanced several environmental and public health policies. In October 2011, the Multnomah County Board of Health adopted his proposal to restrict the sale of reusable beverage containers containing Bisphenol A (BPA). The U.S. Food and Drug Administration instituted a similar nationwide ban for baby bottles and sippy cups in 2012. In 2012, Cogen directed the Multnomah County Health Department to study the health impacts of coal exported by rail through the county. The resulting 2013 report identified potential respiratory and cardiovascular risks associated with coal dust and diesel exhaust emissions.

In infrastructure and public management, Cogen supported the June 2012 board resolution authorizing the $10.4 million sale of the county-owned Morrison Bridgehead site to Melvin Mark Development Company for the James Beard Public Market project. Later that year, the board referred a measure to the ballot to establish a permanent library district for the Multnomah County Library. Voters approved the measure in November 2012, replacing the previous temporary tax levy system with a permanent taxing district to stabilize library funding.

In early 2013, the county enacted a firearms safety ordinance co-sponsored by Cogen and Commissioner Deborah Kafoury. The ordinance restricted the possession of loaded firearms in public places, regulated firearm discharge, and required owners to report stolen firearms within 48 hours. In April 2013, the Multnomah County Sheriff's Office implemented a policy developed with Cogen's office to stop honoring federal immigration holds (I-247 detainers) for individuals cleared of low-level misdemeanor booking charges. In June 2013, Cogen signed an executive rule requiring the inclusion of gender-neutral bathrooms in all new and remodeled county-owned buildings.

== 2013 controversy and resignation ==
In 2013, Cogen admitted to an extramarital affair with a policy advisor in the Multnomah County Health Department following public allegations. The policy advisor resigned under pressure from the county health department regarding a conflict of interest. Cogen initially rejected calls for his resignation, surviving a July 24 vote by his four fellow county commissioners. On September 6, 2013, he announced his resignation, concluding his term in office on September 16. He was succeeded as county chair by his chief of staff, Marissa Madrigal.

== Post-political career ==
Cogen joined Impact NW, a Portland-based social service and anti-poverty organization, as managing director in January 2015, working alongside longtime director Susan Stoltenberg. In June 2016, he was appointed executive director, taking over from Stoltenberg on July 1; at the time, Impact NW had roughly 400 employees and an annual budget of $13.5 million and provided services to low-income children, families, seniors, and adults with disabilities. He held the position until April 2019.

Cogen's tenure at Impact NW coincided with a period of significant financial strain at the organization. Willamette Week reported in 2017 that Impact NW had posted operating losses of $817,000 in 2015 and $1.2 million in 2016 and remained behind budget for the current year; the county, which supplied most of the organization's funding, had begun requiring monthly financial reports after raising oversight concerns. Cogen said Impact NW had cut its management team, moved its office out of downtown, and trimmed expenses in response. When Cogen stepped down in 2019, Impact NW said he had fulfilled his mandate to return the organization to financial health, and he was succeeded as executive director by Andy Nelson. Cogen also took on board leadership roles during this period, including as board chair of the Portland Human Rights Commission and of a state transportation electrification commission, according to Impact NW.

In February 2020, Cogen filed his candidacy with the Oregon Secretary of State to run in the 2020 Democratic primary to succeed retiring state Representative Alissa Keny-Guyer in Oregon's 46th House district. He was defeated in the May 2020 primary election, placing second to Khanh Pham.Cite: https://ballotpedia.org/Jeffrey_Cogen#:~:text=Khanh%20Pham%20defeated%20Jeffrey%20Cogen,Candidate

In the years that followed, Cogen trained as a facilitator through InnerTrek, a Portland-area program that prepares practitioners for Oregon's regulated psilocybin services program, established by a 2020 ballot measure. According to his professional website, he now offers individual and group psilocybin sessions in the Portland area.

== Personal life ==
Cogen lives in Northeast Portland with his wife, Lisa. In July 2017, Cogen suffered a moderate stroke.
