= Kfoury =

Kfoury is a surname. It may refer to:

- Basil Kfoury (1794-1859), bishop of the Melkite Greek Catholic Archeparchy of Alexandria
- Dionysius Kfoury, (1879-1965), bishop of the Melkite Greek Catholic Archeparchy of Alexandria
- Wael Kfoury (born awch al Oumara, Zahlé, Lebanon), known by his stage name Wael Kfoury (وائل كفوري), Lebanese singer
- Bechara Kfoury (1943-2015), former Lebanese entrepreneur and philanthropist from Chekka, Lebanon

== See also ==
- Kafoury
- Kafouri
