= Jean-Marie Chami =

Lebanese-born Melkite Catholic bishop (born 1962)

His Excellency, The Most Reverend Jean-Marie Chami
- Titular Bishop of Tarsus of the Greek Melkites, Patriarchal Vicar of Egypt, Sudan, and South Sudan
- Church: Melkite Greek Catholic Church
- Installed: 25 June 2022
- Predecessor: Georges Bakar

Orders
- Ordination: 8 December 1996
- Consecration: 3 September 2022 by Youssef Absi, Georges Bacouni and Robert Rabbat

Personal details
- Born: 14 May 1962 (age 64) Beirut, Lebanon
- Residence: Cairo, Egypt

Jean-Marie Chami, Ist. del Prado (born 14 May 1962) is a Lebanese-born Melkite Greek Catholic hierarch. He currently serves as the Titular Bishop of Tarsus of the Greek Melkites and the Patriarchal Vicar of Egypt, Sudan, and South Sudan since 2022.

== Biography ==
Jean-Marie Chami was born on 14 May 1962 in Beirut, Lebanon. He initially pursued secular studies, and after his high school studies with the Brothers of the Christian Schools, he studied at the Faculty of Fine Arts and Musicology and worked as an architect for a few years.

After completing his philosophical and theological studies for the priesthood, he was ordained a priest for the Melkite Greek Catholic Archeparchy of Beirut and Jbeil on 8 December 1996.

Following his ordination, Chami combined traditional pastoral work with extensive social and community services. He served as a parish priest, and later bursar and syncellus of the Archeparchy of Beirut. Also worked as a school teacher, and became deeply involved in spiritual direction for youth movements, and engaging in particular in pastoral assistance to people with disabilities. Discerning a religious vocation, he joined the secular clerical Prado Institute in 2003 and also was elected superior for the Middle East priests of the Prado since 2019.

=== Episcopal ministry ===
On 25 June 2022, Pope Francis assented to Chami's election by the Synod of Bishops of the Melkite Greek Catholic Church as the Titular Bishop of Tarsus of the Greek Melkites and Patriarchal Vicar of Egypt, Sudan, and South Sudan, succeeding Archbishop Georges Bakar. He received his episcopal consecration on 3 September 2022 at the Basilica of St. Paul in Harissa from Patriarch Youssef Absi, with Archbishop Georges Bacouni and Bishop Robert Rabbat serving as co-consecrators.

In his capacity as Patriarchal Vicar, Chami represents the Melkite Catholic community across Egypt and the Sudans, engaging in inter-faith dialogue, managing local parishes, and advocating for regional peace and humanitarian aid amid regional geopolitical conflicts.
