= Melkite Greek Catholic Patriarchal Dependent Territory of Jerusalem =

Eastern Catholic missionary jurisdiction in the Holy Land

Coordinates: 31.7786°N 35.2294°E

Patriarchal Dependent Territory of Jerusalem (Melkite Greek) Hierosolymitana Melchitarum

Location
- Country: Palestine (region)
- Ecclesiastical province: Patriarchate of Antioch

Current leadership
- Pope: Leo XIV
- Protosyncellus: Yasser Ayyash

The Melkite Greek Catholic Patriarchal Dependent Territory of Jerusalem (Latin: Hierosolymitana Melchitarum) is a branch of the Melkite Greek Catholic Church immediately subject to the Patriarch of Antioch of the Melkites. In 2023, Yasser Ayyash is the Vicar Apostolic of the Patriarch Youssef Absi.

Its headquarters is the Cathedral of Our Lady of the Annunciation, Jerusalem.

== Affiliated patriarchal vicars ==
- Elias (Meletios) Fendeh (2 February 1838 consecrated - 14 November 1851 appointed arcieparca of Baalbek)
- Ambroise Abdo (1860 - 15 November 1866 appointed prefect of Zahleh and Furzol)
- Ambroise Abdo (1875-1876) (for the second time)
- Gabriel Abu Saada (1948 - 1 March 1965 died)
- Hilarion Capucci, BA (30 July 1965 - 1974 resigned)
- Loutfi Laham (1974 - 29 November 2000 elected Patriarch of Antioch)
- Mtanios Haddad, BS (2000 - 2006 resigned)
- Georges Bakar (9 February 2006 - 5 January 2008 resigned)
- Joseph Jules Zerey (4 June 2008 - 9 February 2018 resigned)
- Yasser Ayyash (since 9 February 2018)
