= Deborah Kafoury =

American politician (born 1967)

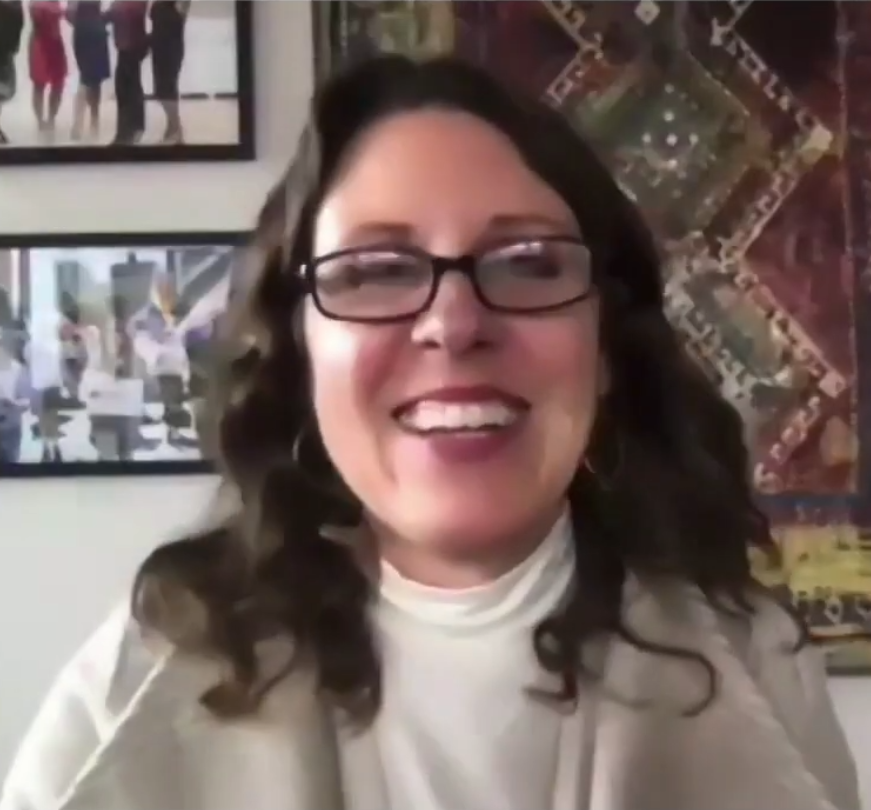
- Kafoury in 2020

Chair of the Multnomah County Board of Commissioners
- In office January 8, 2015 – December 31, 2022
- Preceded by: Marissa Madrigal
- Succeeded by: Jessica Vega Pederson

Member of the Multnomah County Board of Commissioners from the 1st district
- In office January 1, 2009 – October 18, 2013
- Preceded by: Maria Rojo de Steffey
- Succeeded by: Liesl Wendt

Member of the Oregon House of Representatives
- In office January 1999 – February 27, 2004
- Preceded by: Margaret Carter
- Succeeded by: Joe Smith

Personal details
- Born: August 19, 1967 (age 59) Walla Walla, Washington, U.S.
- Party: Democratic
- Relatives: Stephen Kafoury (father); Gretchen Kafoury (mother)
- Education: Whitman College (BA)

Deborah Kafoury (born August 19, 1967) is a politician in the U.S. state of Oregon.

Born in Walla Walla, Washington, Kafoury received her bachelor's degree from Whitman College. She was the chair of the Multnomah County Commission, where she succeeded Jeff Cogen. She previously held a seat on the commission, which she resigned in October 2013 in order to run for chair in the May 2014 election. She noted her work on renovations to the Sellwood Bridge as something she would continue as chair, and pushed for the passage of Metro's 10-year, $2.4 billion homeless services measure.

Kafoury was a founder of the young voter mobilization nonprofit X-PAC and served three terms in the Oregon House of Representatives, from 1999 to 2004, including a leadership role in the Democratic Party caucus.

She is the daughter of Stephen Kafoury and the late Gretchen Kafoury. She is also the first cousin of Trevor Kafoury, formerly the VP of commercial real estate brokerage CBRE in Portland, Oregon.

== Multnomah County ==
In 2008, Kafoury was elected to the Multnomah County Commission. As a commissioner, she worked on efforts to replace the Sellwood Bridge and the Multnomah County Courthouse.

In October 2013, she resigned to run for chair, as required by the county charter. After receiving endorsements from several local newspapers, she was elected Multnomah County Chair on May 20, 2014. She took office June 5, 2014, and left it on December 31, 2022.

In response to the region's housing crisis, Kafoury established a Joint Office of Homeless Services in partnership with the City of Portland. The Joint Office consolidated a number of initiatives under one roof, focusing on programs such as short-term rental assistance to vulnerable people, transition out of shelter and into permanent housing, and increased capacity of Portland area shelters. Under Kafoury's tenure the Joint Office of Homeless Services used at least 2 million taxpayer dollars to purchase 22,700 tents and 69,514 tarps for the homeless.

At a Board of Commissioners meeting on December 21, 2017, Kafoury called fellow commissioner Loretta Smith a "bitch" after abruptly ending the meeting while Smith was asking questions.

In 2018, Kafoury and the Oregon Nurses Association attempted to get a $2 tobacco tax increase on the state ballot. The petitioners failed to get enough signatures to qualify the measure for the ballot.

== Portland Public Schools ==
Kafoury has worked as Chief of Staff to the Superintendent of Portland Public Schools (PPS) since July 2024.

On October 27, 2026, Kafoury notified PPS Superintendent Kimberlee Armstrong that she would be resigning as PPS Chief of Staff in January 2027, earlier than originally planned. Ten days later, Willamette Week reported that Kafoury had allegedly used the private messaging app Signal to communicate with an employee of Procedeo, a private firm whose contract with PPS was under criminal investigation. In the alleged Signal exchange, Kafoury referred to a PPS school board member as an "asshole." Willamette Week reported that Kafoury had subsequently apologized to the board member privately. A PPS spokesperson stated that "Signal is not a district-approved platform for conducting official PPS communications" and that "PPS is taking action to determine whether any messages would constitute public records and, if so, whether they can be recovered."
