= Willy Chotzen =

American politician

Member of the Oregon House of Representatives from the 46th district
- Incumbent
- Assumed office January 13, 2025
- Preceded by: Khanh Pham

Personal details
- Born: Ashland, Oregon, U.S.
- Party: Democratic
- Education: Washington University in St. Louis (BA); Harvard Law School (JD)

Willy Chotzen (born April 30, 1991) is an American politician who serves as a member of the Oregon House of Representatives for the 46th district.

== Electoral history ==
2024 Oregon State Representative, 46th district
Party	Candidate	Votes	%
Democratic	Willy Chotzen	25,542	79.1
Republican	John Mark Alexander	4,414	13.7
Independent	Kevin Levy	1,252	3.9
Libertarian	Austin Daniel	1,040	3.2
Write-in		58	0.2
Total votes		32,306	100%
