= Mildred Schwab =

American politician

Portland City Commissioner
- In office December 29, 1972 – January 5, 1987
- Preceded by: Neil Goldschmidt
- Succeeded by: Earl Blumenauer

Personal details
- Born: January 9, 1917 Portland, Oregon
- Died: c. January 13, 1999 (aged 82) Portland, Oregon

Mildred A. Schwab (January 9, 1917 – c. January 13, 1999) was an attorney and politician from Portland, Oregon, in the United States. She served as a City Commissioner from 1973 to 1986; she was appointed to fill the vacancy created when Neil Goldschmidt was elected mayor, and was re-elected three times. Her brother, Herbert M. Schwab, served on the Oregon Court of Appeals.

== Life ==
She was born in Portland to Jewish immigrants and grew up in northeast Portland, at the poor end of lower middle class. She attended Grant High School and the Northwestern School of Business. She was one of the first women to study law, and graduated from Northwestern College of Law (at Lewis & Clark College) in 1939 and qualified for the Oregon Bar. She worked as a lawyer until her appointment to the Portland City Council. She took office on the council on December 29, 1972.

In 1971, Portland still had two lunch spots closed to women. Schwab organized a sit-in at Perkins' Pub (in the basement of Lipman-Wolfe), which succeeded in opening the establishment to women. She also was part of a small group (also including Gretchen Kafoury) who opened City Club of Portland to women. She was the first woman nominated to be a Portland Rose Festival ambassador (or Royal Rosarian), though she declined the honor.

Part of her time as city commissioner was in charge of the police and fire departments—Portland's equivalent of police commissioner—for which she received great support.

Schwab was found dead at her home in Southwest Portland on January 13, 1999. Congestive heart disease had left her in poor health.
