= Georges Bakar =

Egyptian bishop

George Michel Bakar Ist. del Prado
- Protosyncellus Emeritus of Egypt, Sudan, and South Sudan
- Native name: جورج بكر
- Church: Melkite Greek Catholic Church
- See: Patriarchal Dependent Territory of Egypt, Sudan, and South Sudan
- In office: 4 June 2008 – 25 June 2022
- Predecessor: Joseph Jules Zerey
- Successor: Jean-Marie Chami
- Other post: Titular Archeparch of Pelusium (since 2006)
- Previous post: Protosyncellus of Jerusalem (2006-2008)

Orders
- Ordination: 6 July 1973 by Paul Antaki
- Consecration: 24 March 2006 by Gregory III Laham

Personal details
- Born: 20 April 1946 (age 80) Cairo, Kingdom of Egypt

George Michel Bakar (born 20 April 1946 in Cairo, Egypt) is an Archeparch of the Melkite Greek Catholic Church.

He was ordained priest in 1973, then appointed Protosyncellus of Palestine and Titular Archbishop of the Titular See of Pelusium dei Greco-Melkiti in 2006. He resigned from the former in 2008 and was appointed Protosyncellus of Egypt and Sudan in the same year. He retired in 2022.

== See also ==
- List of Melkite Greek Catholic Patriarchs of Antioch
- Patriarch of Antioch
- Eastern Catholic Churches
