= Ambroise Abdo =

Ambroise Abdo (8 January 1820 - 1876) was a bishop of the Melkite Greek Catholic Archeparchy of Jerusalem and Melkite Greek Catholic Archeparchy of Zahle and Forzol.

== Life ==
He was born in Aleppo, Syria in the Ottoman Empire. He was appointed in 1860 as Apostolic Vicar of Jerusalem and, on 1 April 1860, ordained bishop by Melkite Patriarch of Antioch, Clement Bahouth. His co-consecrators were Gregory Atta, Archeparch of Homs and Eparch Jacques Heliani, from Damascus. In 1864 he was appointed Patriarchal Vicar to Egypt and Sudan. On 15 November 1866 Abdo was appointed bishop of the Melkite Greek Catholic Archeparchy of Zahle and Forzol.

In 1869-1870 Abdo participated in the First Vatican Council in Rome. On 24 December 1875, he was again appointed Apostolic Vicar of Jerusalem, a position he would hold until his death in 1876.
