= Gretchen Kafoury =

American politician (1942-2015)

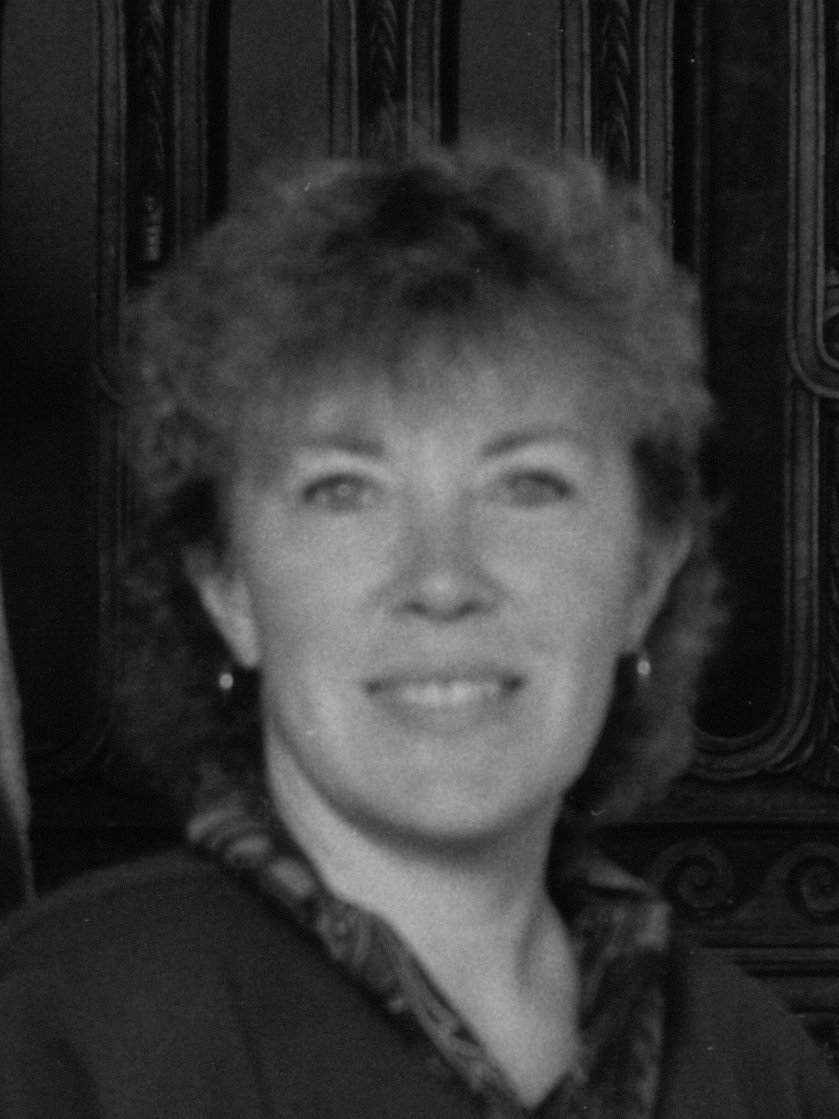

Portland City Commissioner
- In office January 1, 1991 – December 31, 1998
- Preceded by: Bob Koch
- Succeeded by: Dan Saltzman
- Constituency: Portland, Oregon

Multnomah County Commissioner
- In office 1985–1991

Member of the Oregon House of Representatives from the 13th district
- In office 1977–1982
- Preceded by: Stephen Kafoury
- Succeeded by: Ed Leek

Personal details
- Born: Gretchen Miller; June 23, 1942 Walla Walla, Washington, U.S.
- Died: March 13, 2015 (aged 72) Portland, Oregon, U.S.
- Party: Democratic
- Spouse: Stephen Kafoury (divorced by 1975)
- Children: Deborah Kafoury

Gretchen Miller Kafoury (June 23, 1942 – March 13, 2015) was an American politician, who served in the Oregon House of Representatives, the Multnomah County Commission, and the Portland City Council. She served in the legislature from 1977–82, the Multnomah County Commission from 1985–91, and the Portland City Council from 1991-98.

Gretchen Miller met and married Stephen Kafoury while attending Whitman College in the early 1960s. She graduated from Whitman in 1963, with a Music degree. The couple moved to Portland in 1965, but soon afterward they joined the Peace Corps, and Gretchen Kafoury spent two years in Iran, teaching English as a Peace Corps volunteer. They returned to Portland in 1967, and Gretchen Kafoury became a teacher at Portland State University.

Kafoury co-founded the Oregon chapter of the National Organization for Women (NOW) in 1970 and the Oregon Women's Political Caucus in 1971. In 1972, she was one of a small group of women (also including Mildred Schwab) who protested the City Club of Portland's policy excluding women members, effecting a change in the club's policy of more than fifty years.

By 1975, Gretchen and Stephen Kafoury had divorced, but Gretchen continued to use her married name. She subsequently married two more times, her last marriage ending in 1998, but continued to use the name Gretchen Kafoury or Gretchen Miller Kafoury.

Gretchen Kafoury's ex-husband, Stephen Kafoury, preceded her in the legislature, and her daughter Deborah Kafoury served two terms there as well, including one as minority leader.

She was elected to the Portland City Council in 1990, and served on the council from 1991 to 1998.

Beginning in 1999, Kafoury was an instructor at Portland State University, teaching classes related to homelessness, poverty, and community development.

She died on March 13, 2015, aged 72, of natural causes at her Portland home.
