= Oregon's 46th House district =

Legislative districts in the state of Oregon

Oregon's 46th House district after redistricting after the 2020 Census

District 46 of the Oregon House of Representatives is one of 60 House legislative districts in the state of Oregon. As of 2021, the district is contained entirely within Multnomah County and includes much of southeast Portland, including the Jade District. The current representative for the district is Democrat Willy Chotzen of Portland.

== Election results ==
District boundaries have changed over time. Therefore, representatives before 2021 may not represent the same constituency as today. General election results from 2000 to present are as follows:

Year	Candidate	Party	Percent	Opponent	Party	Percent	Opponent	Party	Percent	Opponent	Party	Percent	Write-in percentage
2000	Susan Morgan	Republican	72.38%	Earl Calhoun	Democratic	27.22%	No third candidate			No fourth candidate			0.40%
2002 (Note: Steve March was the incumbent in this election. He previously represented District 15, but was moved to this district due to redistricting following the 2000 United States census.)	Steve March	Democratic	80.49%	Eric Dickman	Libertarian	18.04%	No third candidate			No fourth candidate			1.47%
2004	Steve March	Democratic	74.23%	Bill Cornett	Republican	19.93%	Allan Page	Constitution	5.84%	No fourth candidate			
2006	Ben Cannon	Democratic	77.01%	Bill Cornett	Republican	16.43%	Paul Loney	Pacific Green	6.21%	No fourth candidate			0.35%
2008	Ben Cannon	Democratic	97.78%	Unopposed						No fourth candidate			2.22%
2010	Ben Cannon	Democratic	82.31%	Russell Turner	Republican	17.20%	No third candidate			No fourth candidate			0.49%
2012 (Note: Alissa Keny-Guyer was the incumbent in this election. She was appointed to this seat on September 27, 2011 to replace Ben Cannon, who resigned to become the Education Policy Advisor to Governor John Kitzhaber.)	Alissa Keny-Guyer	Democratic	97.24%	Unopposed						No fourth candidate			2.76%
2014	Alissa Keny-Guyer	Democratic	96.77%	Unopposed						No fourth candidate			3.23%
2016	Alissa Keny-Guyer	Democratic	97.95%	Unopposed						No fourth candidate			2.05%
2018	Alissa Keny-Guyer	Democratic	97.69%	Unopposed						No fourth candidate			2.31%
2020	Khanh Pham	Democratic	97.63%	Unopposed						No fourth candidate			2.37%
2022	Khanh Pham	Democratic	83.78%	Timothy Sytsma	Republican	16.07%	No third candidate			No fourth candidate			0.15%
2024	Willy Chotzen	Democratic	79.1%	John Mark Alexander	Republican	13.7%	Kevin Levy	Independent	3.9%	Austin Daniel	Libertarian	3.2%	0.2%

== See also ==
- Oregon Legislative Assembly
- Oregon House of Representatives
