= Basil Kfoury =

Basil Kfoury (born in 1794 in Khenchara, Lebanon - died on 5 April 1859) was bishop of the Patriarchal Vicariate of Egypt and Sudan named by Patriarch Maximos III Mazloum.

== Life ==
Basile Kfoury was appointed on 5 September 1837 Bishop of Alexandria. Melkite Patriarch of Alexandria Maximos III Mazloum was his consecrator and his co-consecrators were Théodore Abou-Karim (Titular Bishop of Alia and Vicar Apostolic of the Coptic Catholic Church of Alexandria) and Giuiseppe Angelo di Fazio, OFM (Titular Bishop of Tipaza and Vicar Apostolic of Aleppo in Syria). He was co-consekrator of Athanase Khouzan (Titular Archbishop of Maronea and Vicar Apostolic of the Coptic Church of Alexandria). His successor was Joannitius Massamiri.
