= Cathedral of Our Lady of the Annunciation, Jerusalem =

Church in Jerusalem

Coordinates: 31.77728°N 35.22809°E

Cathedral of the Annunciation
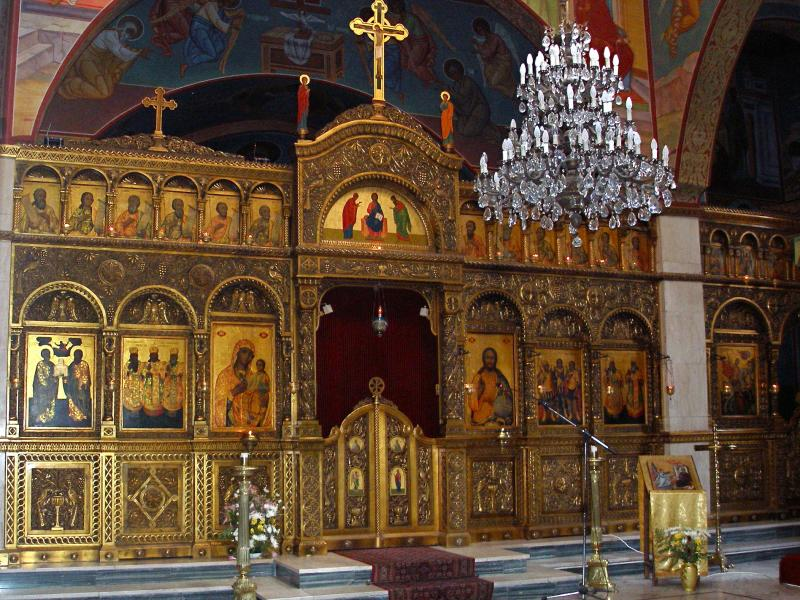
- Cathedral of the Annunciation
- Location: East Jerusalem
- Denomination: Melkite Greek Catholic Church
- Sui iuris church: Bizantine Catholic

History
- Status: Cathedral
- Dedication: Our Lady of the Annunciation

Architecture
- Functional status: Active

Administration
- Diocese: Melkite Greek Catholic Patriarchal Dependent Territory of Jerusalem

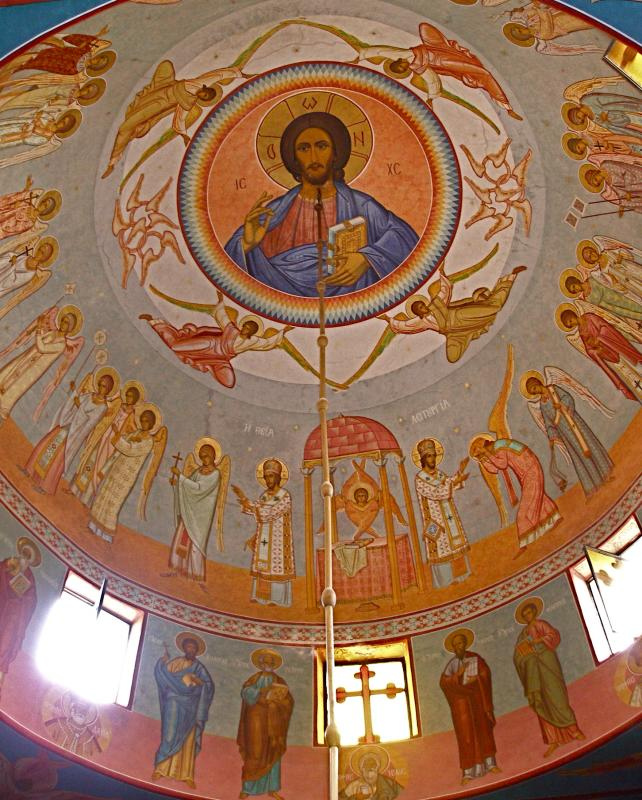
Fresco of Christ inside the cathedral.

The Cathedral of the Annunciation of the Virgin, also called Greek Catholic Melkite Cathedral of the Annunciation of the Virgin or simply Church of Our Lady of the Annunciation, is a Melkite Greek Catholic cathedral located in the Christian Quarter of the Old City of Jerusalem. It is dedicated to the Annunciation.

It serves as the headquarters of the Melkite Greek Catholic Patriarchal Dependent Territory of Jerusalem (Archieparchia Hierosolymitana Melchitarum), whose patriarch since 1772 is responsible for the Jerusalem Melkites by the encyclical Orientalium dignitas of Pope Leo XIII.

As part of the Old City of Jerusalem, it is categorised as a UNESCO World Heritage site since 1981.

== See also ==
- Catholic Church in Palestine
- Melkite Greek Catholic Church
