= City Club of Portland =

American nonprofit organization

Coordinates: 45.524976°N 122.671999°W

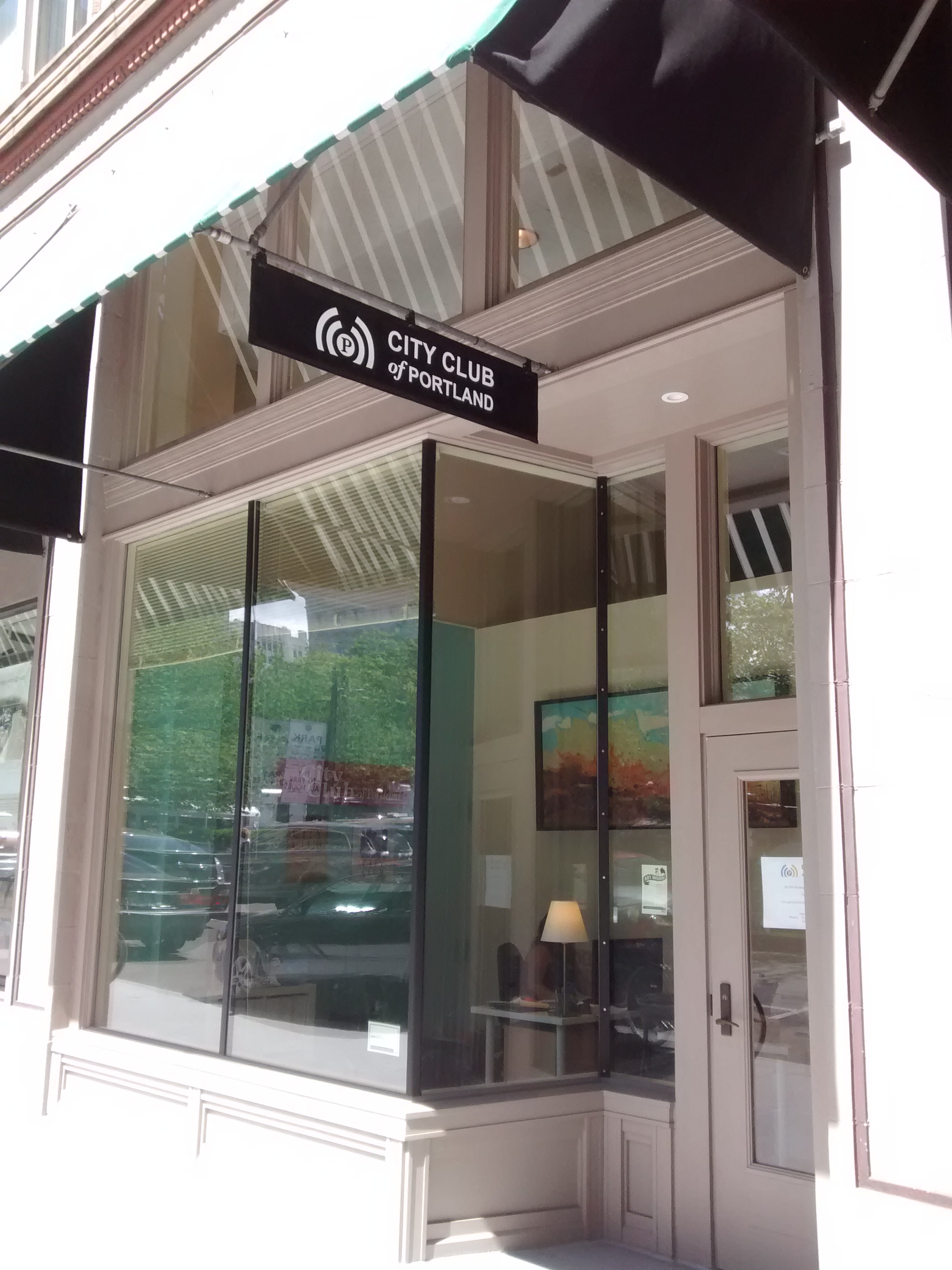
- Formation: 1916
- Type: Non-Profit
- Headquarters: 221 NW 2nd Ave Ste 213, Portland, OR 97209
- Region served: Portland, Oregon (United States)
- Members: 1,500
- Executive Director: Julia Meier
- Staff: 4
- Website: pdxcityclub.org

The City Club of Portland is a nonprofit, nonpartisan civic organization based in Portland in the U.S. state of Oregon. Established in 1916, the organization had approximately 1500 members and a paid staff of 4 in 2013. The former Mayor of Portland, Sam Adams, served as executive director 2013 to 2015. The current executive director is Julia Meier.

== Organizational history ==
The City Club of Portland was organized in 1916 by a small group of men who began meeting in a downtown Portland restaurant to discuss the city's public institutions and government. Their goals included assembling a wide variety of participants, discussing civic problems, and improving the city's economic and social conditions.

The City Club of Portland was closed to women until pressure by lawyer and future City Commissioner Mildred Schwab was successful in opening its meetings. The club, all-male for roughly six decades, began admitting women to membership in October 1973.

In January 2013 the City Club of Portland captured headlines by announcing its choice of former mayor of Portland Sam Adams as the group's Executive Director.

== Membership and staff ==
News reports at the time of the Adams selection indicated that the City Club had a membership of approximately 1500 and a paid staff of 4, including its director. A new membership costs $190 per year for individuals, with renewal at $165. The current executive director is Julia Meier.

== Friday Forums ==
City Club functions include Friday Forums built around speeches by experts in government, the arts, sciences, and education. The forums, which are open to the public, take place between 11:30 a.m. and 1:15 p.m. on Fridays at the Sentinel Hotel (ex-Governor Hotel) in downtown Portland. Audio recordings of the forums, updated weekly, are available online as MP3 digital audio files that can be downloaded from the City Club web site. Local radio and television stations broadcast live or taped forums at various times during the week.

Speakers at City Club meetings over the years have included Lewis Mumford, an expert on urban planning, who in 1938 urged Oregonians to do a better job of protecting their natural resources and "issued a stern challenge to the leaders of Portland who had frustrated attempts at rational city planning since the Olmsted Report in 1904... ". The Olmsted Report, received by the city in December 1903, had emphasized creation of the 40-Mile Loop, a system of parks and linking parkways in Portland that would take advantage of natural scenery.

A few of the other speakers and forum topics have been:

- Gov. Tom McCall (1974), "Tom McCall Farewell"
- Karl Menninger (1981), "Our Criminal Injustice System"
- Sen. Mark Hatfield (1982), "The Nuclear Arms Freeze"
- David Broder (1983), "Setting the Stage for the '84 Election"
- Eleanor Smeal (1984), "Why and How Women Will Elect the Next President"
- Rev. Jesse Jackson (1987), "Peace, Justice, and Putting America Back to Work
- Sen. Elizabeth Dole (1990), "Leadership for the Year 2000"
- Kimbark McColl (1993), "Twenty Years of Planning in Oregon"
- Mayor Vera Katz (2000), "The State of the City: Connecting the Dots"
- Molly Raphael (2004), "Why Libraries Matter in the 21st Century"
- Gov. John Kitzhaber (2005), "On the Road to Revolution: Fear and Loathing in the U.S. Health Care System"

Many past events are viewable on their YouTube channel
