= Alissa Keny-Guyer =

American politician (born 1959)

Member of the Oregon House of Representatives from the 46th district
- In office September 27, 2011 – January 11, 2021
- Preceded by: Ben Cannon
- Succeeded by: Khanh Pham

Personal details
- Born: May 20, 1959 (age 67) New York, New York, U.S.
- Party: Democratic
- Spouse: Neal Keny-Guyer
- Children: Evan (born 1990), Jordan (born 1993), Maraya (born 1996)
- Education: Stanford University; University of Hawaii at Manoa
- Profession: State Representative
- Website: alissakenyguyer.com www.oregonlegislature.gov/keny-guyer/Pages/default.aspx

Alissa Carolyn Keny-Guyer (born May 20, 1959) is an American politician who served as a Democratic member of the Oregon House of Representatives from District 46 (parts of SE and NE Portland), beginning with her September 27, 2011 appointment by the Multnomah County Board of Commissioners to fill the vacancy caused by the resignation of Ben Cannon.

Over nearly a decade in the Oregon House, Keny-Guyer chaired the House Committee on Human Services & Housing and served on the House Committees on Health Care (vice chair), Revenue, Early Childhood & Family Supports, Consumer Protection & Government Efficiency (interim chair), Energy/Environment/Water, and the Joint Ways & Means Subcommittee on Human Services.

She also served on the Governor's Children's Cabinet, on the Oregon Children’s Integrated Data (OCID) program oversight, and as Assistant Majority Leader for the Oregon House Democrats.

In July, 2021 she moved with her family to Santa Fe, New Mexico. She serves on the boards of the New Mexico Housing Trust Fund and the Penney Family Fund and on the City of Santa Fe Community Development Commission.

== Education ==
Keny-Guyer earned her BA in human biology from Stanford University and her MPH from the University of Hawaii at Manoa.

== Elections ==
Keny-Guyer won her 2012, 2014, 2016, and 2018 Democratic primary and general elections unopposed. In Oregon's fusion voting system that allows nominations from up to three parties, she was nominated by the Democratic, Working Families, and Independent parties in 2014, 2016 and 2018, and the Democratic, Working Families, and Republican parties in 2012.

== Electoral history ==
2012 Oregon State Representative, 46th district
| Party | Candidate | Votes | % |
|---|---|---|---|
| Democratic | Alissa Keny-Guyer | 19,945 | 97.2 |
| Write-in | | 566 | 2.8 |
| Total votes | | 20,511 | 100% |

2014 Oregon State Representative, 46th district
| Party | Candidate | Votes | % |
|---|---|---|---|
| Democratic | Alissa Keny-Guyer | 17,930 | 96.8 |
| Write-in | | 598 | 3.2 |
| Total votes | | 18,528 | 100% |

2016 Oregon State Representative, 46th district
| Party | Candidate | Votes | % |
|---|---|---|---|
| Democratic | Alissa Keny-Guyer | 23,366 | 98.0 |
| Write-in | | 488 | 2.0 |
| Total votes | | 23,854 | 100% |

2018 Oregon State Representative, 46th district
| Party | Candidate | Votes | % |
|---|---|---|---|
| Democratic | Alissa Keny-Guyer | 24,573 | 97.7 |
| Write-in | | 581 | 2.3 |
| Total votes | | 25,154 | 100% |
