= Gregory III Laham =

Head of the Melkite Greek Catholic Church from 2000 to 2017

His Beatitude Gregory III Laham BS
- Melkite Greek Patriarch Emeritus of Antioch
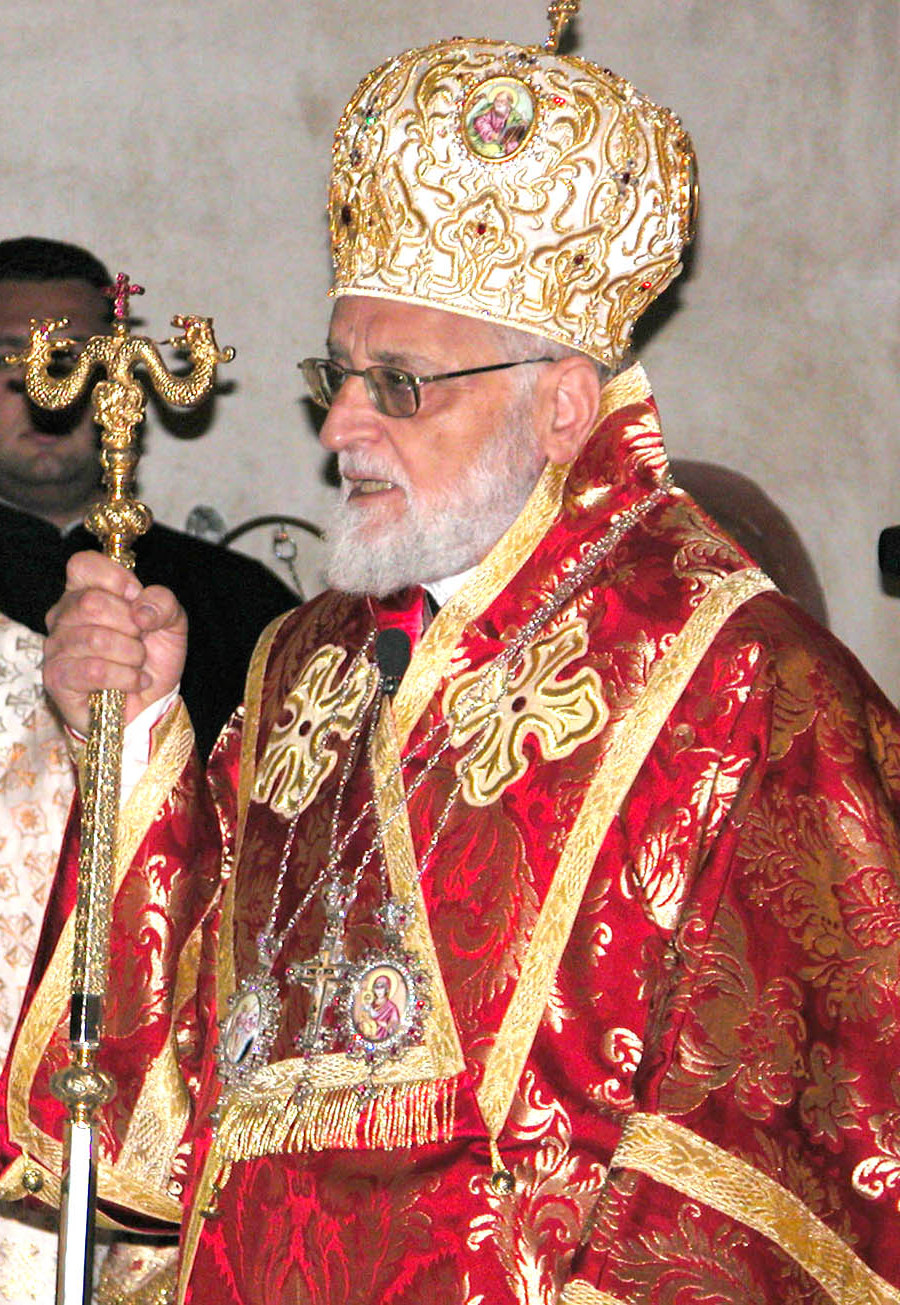
- Native name: غريغوريوس الثالث لحام
- Church: Melkite Greek Catholic Church
- See: Antioch
- Elected: November 29, 2000
- Installed: December 5, 2000
- Term ended: May 6, 2017
- Predecessor: Maximos V Hakim
- Successor: Youssef I Absi
- Other post: Bishop of Damascus
- Previous posts: Auxiliary Melkite Greek Archbishop of Jerusalem (1981–2000); Titular Archbishop of Tarsus dei Greco-Melkiti (1981–2000)

Orders
- Ordination: February 15, 1959
- Consecration: November 27, 1981 by Maximos V Hakim

Personal details
- Born: Lutfy Laham; December 15, 1933 (age 92) Darayya, Syria
- Denomination: Melkite Greek Catholic Church
- Residence: Syria; Lebanon
- Education: Holy Savior Seminary
- Motto: Directione in agape
- Coat of arms

Gregory III Laham BS (Arabic: غريغوريوس الثالث لحام; Latin: Gregorius III Lahamus; born Lutfy Laham, December 15, 1933, in Darayya, Syria), Emeritus Patriarch of Antioch and All the East, of Alexandria and Jerusalem, is the former spiritual leader of the Melkite Greek Catholic Church. He was elected on November 29, 2000, succeeding Patriarch Maximos V Hakim. He retired on May 6, 2017.

He took the name Gregory in honor of Patriarch Gregory II Youssef, who was the last member of his religious order, the Basilian Salvatorian Order, to be elected Patriarch. Gregory III, who studied in Rome, Italy, and is multilingual, is also the author of several books on Eastern Catholic spirituality and theology.

In addition, he served as the Spiritual Protector of the United Obediences (formerly the Paris and Malta Obediences until 2008) of the Order of Saint Lazarus.

== Early years and education ==
Gregory III Laham was born Lutfy Laham in Darayya, Syria, on December 15, 1933.

He entered the Seminary of the Holy Savior of the Basilian Salvatorian Order near Saida, Lebanon, in 1943. He took his simple religious vows in 1949 and his solemn religious vows in 1954. He received his religious and philosophical education at the Holy Savior Seminary, Joun, Lebanon. He continued his theological studies in Rome, Italy, where he was ordained priest on February 15, 1959 in the Church of the Abbey of Grottaferrata.

== Church ==
=== Priesthood ===
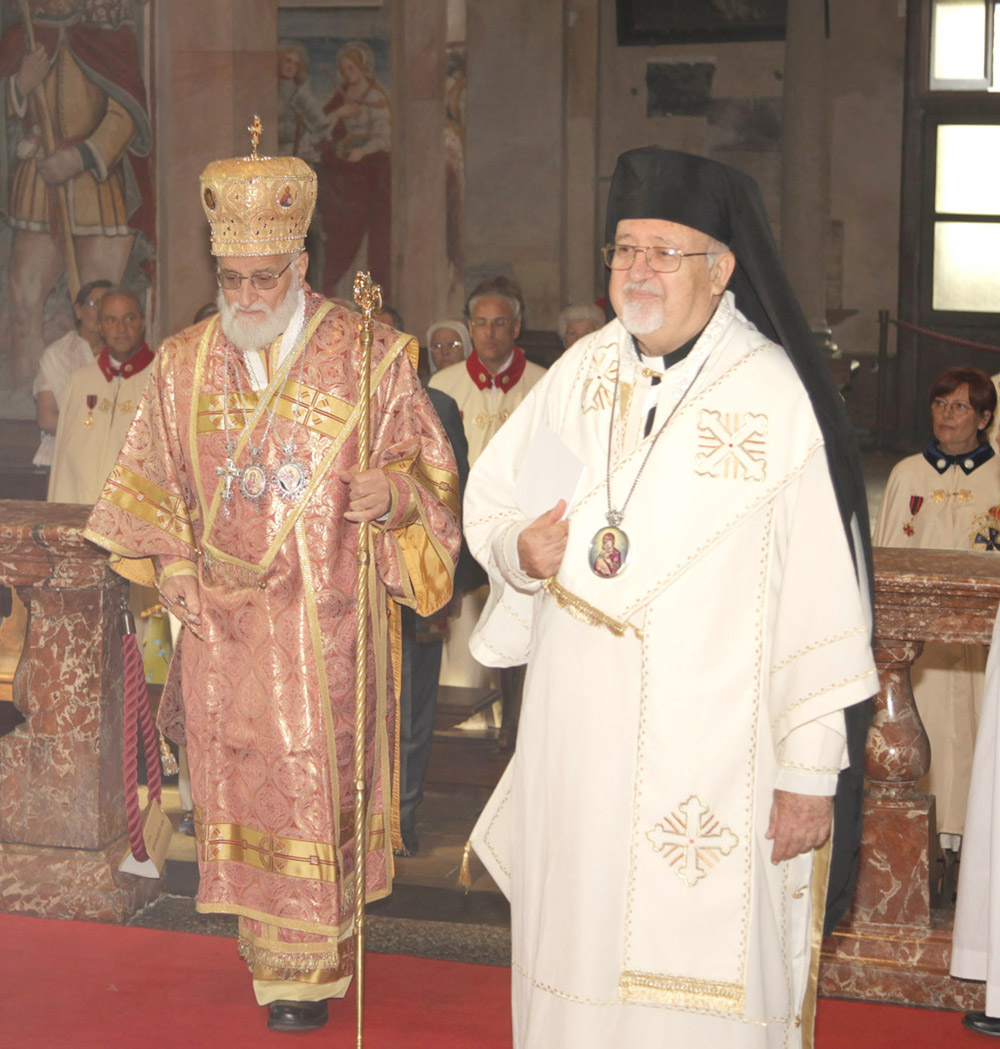
Gregory III with Archbishop Joseph Jules Zerey.

The future patriarch received a doctoral degree in Oriental Theology from the Pontifical Oriental Institute in Rome following his ordination . He then served as superior of the Holy Savior Major Seminary from 1961 until 1964. In 1962 he founded the magazine Al-Wahdah - Unity in Faith, the first ecumenical magazine to be published in the Arabic language. He also founded several orphanages and trade schools in Lebanon.

He was appointed administrator of the Patriarchal Vicariate of Jerusalem in 1975, in the wake of the Israeli arrest of the Patriarchal Vicar of Jerusalem, Archbishop Hilarion Capucci of the Aleppin Salvatorian order. Laham founded the Student Fund in Jerusalem to help needy students and in 1978 the Family Assistance Fund to help needy families in the troubled areas of his diocese. In 1967 he founded at the Patriarchate the Oriental Library to promulgate the knowledge of Eastern traditions. He initiated a variety of social projects such as repairing churches, opening clinics and building public housing, including a guest house for pilgrims at the Patriarchal Center in Jerusalem.

=== Episcopate ===
On September 9, 1981 he was named Archeparch by Patriarch Maximos V Hakim and continued his work as Patriarchal Vicar of Jerusalem as successor to Archeparch Hilarion Capucci. On November 27, 1981 he was enthroned as the titular archbishop of Tarsus and consecrated Archeparch by patriarch Maximos V Hakim. His co-consecrators were Saba Youakim, Archeparch of Petra and Philadelphia and François Abou Mokh, titular bishop of Palmyra dei Greco-Melchiti.

In 1992 Laham was named Patriarchal Exarch of Jerusalem and in 1998 became Protosyncellus of the same city.

Appointed by Patriarch Maximos V as president of the Patriarchal Liturgical Commission, he edited the Anthologion, the prayer book or breviary of the Melkite Greek Catholic Church and The Book of the Liturgies, an updated compendium of the Divine Liturgy. As secretary of the Ecumenical Commission of the Melkite Patriarchate, he led the dialogue between the Melkite Greek Catholic and the Antiochian Orthodox Churches.

=== Patriarchate ===
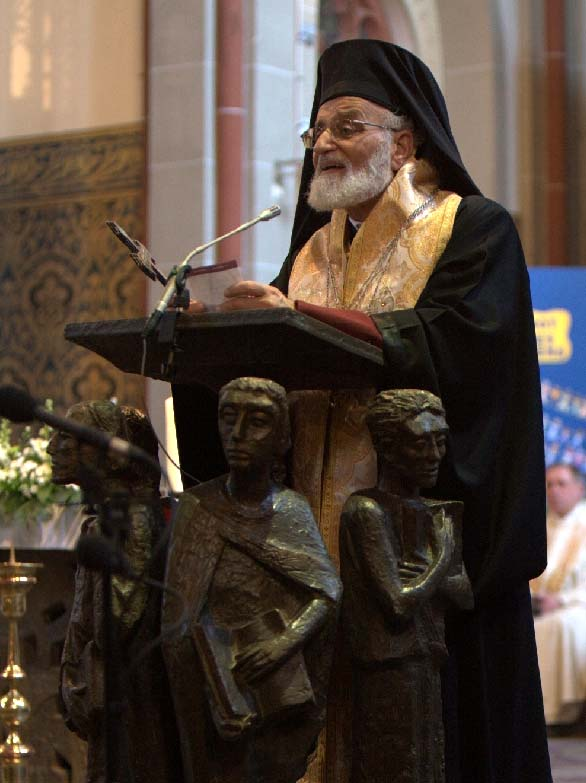
Patriarch Gregory III.

Patriarch Maximos resigned in 2000 at age 92 due to failing health. The episcopal synod of the Melkite Church, met at the patriarchal residence in Raboueh on November 22, 2000 to select a new leader. On November 29 the synod elected Laham patriarch. He chose the name Gregory after the Patriarch Gregory II Youssef, the last member of the Basilian Salvatorian Order to serve as head of the Melkite Church. On December 5, 2000, Pope John Paul II accepted Patriarch Laham's request for ecclesiastical communion.

On May 8, 2008, along with other Melkite bishops and archimandrites, Patriarch Laham was received at the Vatican by Pope Benedict XVI. He repeated this visit on March 15, 2012.

The patriarch is an advocate of the Christian communities of the Near and Middle East. Speaking at a 2010 synod, he asserted that "among the most dangerous effects of the Israeli-Palestinian conflict” is the phenomenon of Christian emigration, "which will make Arab society a society with only one color, a society purely Muslim." Viewing the Near East as Muslim and the West as Christian could mean that "any occasion would be propitious for a new clash of cultures, of civilizations and even of religions -- a destructive clash between the Muslim Arab East and the Christian West," he said. The patriarch called for Christian-Islam dialogue which describes to Muslims "what our fears are," including concern about a lack of separation between religion and government, lack of equality and about a legal system that is based on Islamic law.

In December 2010, Laham was quoted by The Lebanon Daily Star as claiming that attacks against Levantine Christians, were part of a "Zionist conspiracy against Islam." Lahham reportedly stated that "All this behavior has nothing to do with Islam... But it is actually a conspiracy planned by Zionism and some Christians with Zionist orientations and it aims at undermining and giving a bad image of Islam." He further added that media portrayal of the attack the Our Lady of Salvation Church in Baghdad was "a conspiracy against Arabs and the pre-dominantly Muslim Arab world that aims at depicting Arabs and Muslims in Arab countries as terrorist and fundamentalist murderers in order to deny them their rights and especially those of the Palestinians.”

In March 2011 Patriarch Gregory said “we Christians risk demographic extinction and face huge challenges,” calling on league members to “formulate ideas” on how to address the phenomenon. The Palestine-Israel conflict, Lahham said, was the “sole” reason for emigration.

In August 2013 Patriarch Gregory gave an appeal to Asia News "We must listen to the Pope's appeal for peace in Syria. If western countries want to create true democracy then they must build it on reconciliation, through dialogue between Christians and Muslims, not with weapons. This attack being planned by the United States is a criminal act, which will only reap more victims, in addition to the tens of thousands of these two years of war. This will destroy the Arab world's trust in the West"

In September 2015, he urged Syrian Christians not to leave the country, despite the ongoing Syrian Civil War, and implored European countries not to encourage their emigration from their homeland.

Patriarch Gregory III retired on 6 May 2017.

Gregory III Laham speaks Arabic, English, Spanish, French, German, Greek, Italian and Latin. He travels a lot in the world, to draw attention to the difficult situation in Syria to the Christians. He called for a dialogue between all parties in Syria to end the civil war.

== Books and other works ==
Patriarch Gregory III is author of several books, including:

- Introduction to the Liturgical Services and their Symbols in the Eastern Church.
- The Voice of the Shepherd - Eastern Liturgical Spirituality.
- Life of Archbishop Germanos Adam.
- Translations of History of the Melkite Church (English and German).
- The Melkite Greek Catholic Church at the Second Vatican Council.
- Initiation into the spiritual journey of the Chrysostom liturgy'; 1999, ISBN 3-933001-36-6.
- The Chrysostom liturgy: an introduction and explanation; 2002 ISBN 3-933001-43-9.
- Al-Wahada Quarterly (1962–1981); (Unity of the faith, the first ecumenical magazine in Arabic).
- Four volumes of liturgical prayers in Arabic.
- Introduction to the spiritual life of the Byzantine rite; 1990, in Arabic.
- Ne nous laissez pas disparaître : un cri au service de la paix; 2016, in French

== Distinctions ==
=== Orders ===
- Grand Master of the Patriarchal Order of the Holy Cross of Jerusalem
- Protector of the Ordo Militiae Christi Templi Hierosolymitani since 1990 (as are all Melkite Catholic Patriarchs since 2000)
- "Spiritual Protector" of the Malta obedience of the Order of Saint Lazarus
- Grand Cross of the Order of the Holy Sepulchre
- Grand Cross of the Order of the Umayyads of Syria

=== Awards ===
- Muhammad-Nafi-Tschelebi Prize (2012)

== See also ==
- Melkite Greek Catholic Church
- Melkite Greek Catholic Patriarchate of Antioch and All the East

== Notes ==
Catholic Church titles
Preceded by Hilarion Capucci	Auxiliary Melkite Greek Archbishop of Jerusalem; 1975–2000	Succeeded by Georges Bakar
Preceded by Athanasios Toutoungi	Titular Archbishop of Tarsus; 1981–2000	Succeeded by Youssef Absi
Preceded by Maximos V Hakim	Melkite Greek Patriarch of Antioch; 2000–2017	Succeeded by Youssef I Absi
