= Stephen Kafoury =

American politician (born 1941)

Member of the Oregon State Senate
- In office 1977–1981
- Preceded by: Howard R. Norman
- Succeeded by: Rod Monroe

Member of the Oregon House of Representatives from the 13th district
- In office 1973–1977
- Succeeded by: Gretchen Kafoury

Personal details
- Born: October 4, 1941 (age 84) Portland, Oregon
- Party: Democratic
- Spouse(s): Gretchen Kafoury (divorced by 1975); Marge (c. 1977–)

Stephen Kafoury (born October 4, 1941) is an American politician in the U.S. state of Oregon. He served in the Oregon House of Representatives and State Senate. He is a lawyer, having attended Lewis & Clark Law School, Whitman College, and Reed College.
