= Youssef Absi =

Head of the Melkite Greek Catholic Church since 2017

His Beatitude Youssef Absi SMSP
- Patriarch of Antioch and of All the East, of Alexandria, and of Jerusalem
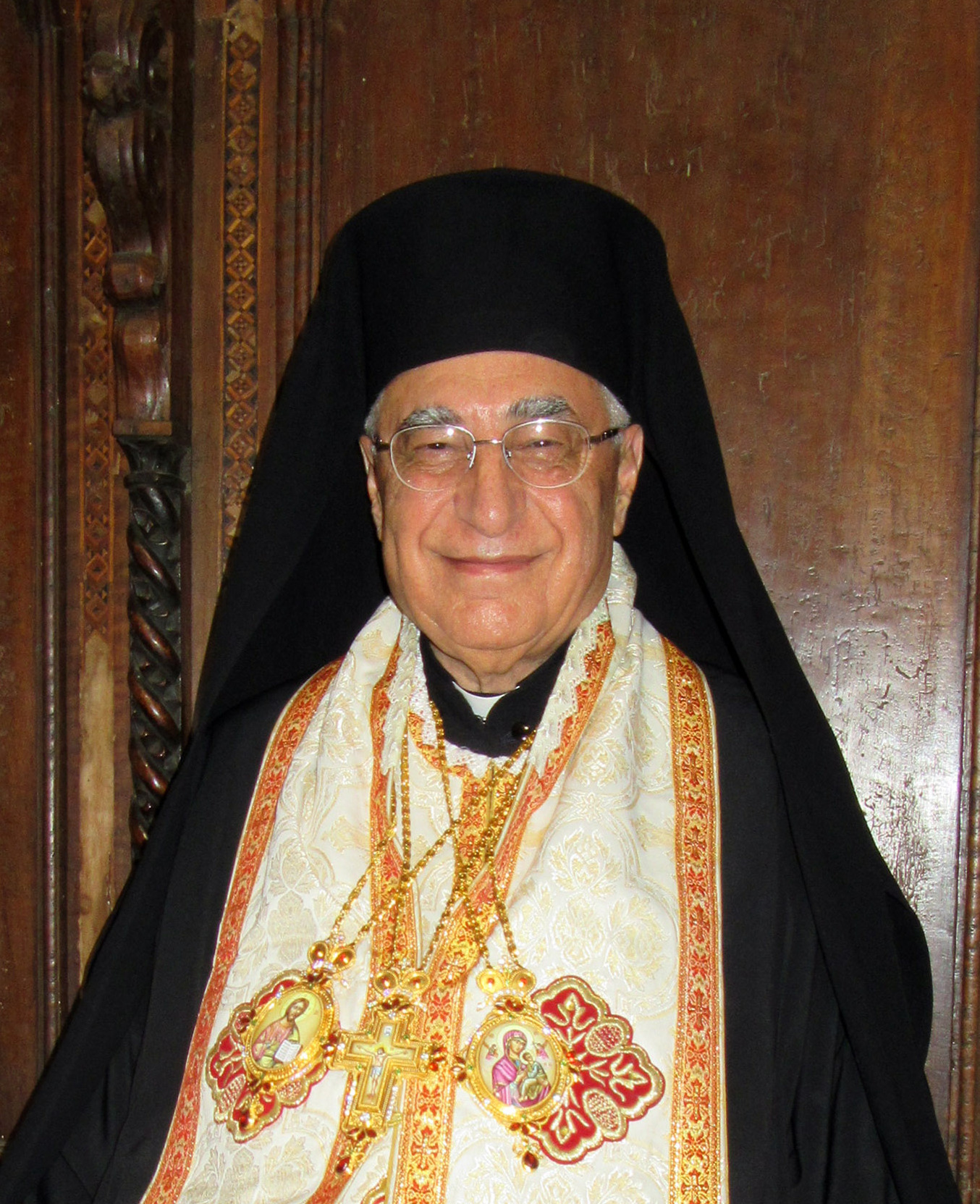
- Absi in 2018
- Native name: يوسف عبسي
- Church: Melkite Greek Catholic Church
- Diocese: Antioch
- See: Antioch
- Elected: 21 June 2017
- Predecessor: Gregory III Laham
- Previous posts: Curial Bishop (2001–2007); Patriarchal Vicar of the Archdiocese of Damascus (2007–2017)

Orders
- Ordination: 6 May 1973 by Maximos V Hakim
- Consecration: 2 September 2001 by Gregory III Laham

Personal details
- Born: Joseph Absi; 20 June 1946 (age 80) Damascus, Syria
- Denomination: Melkite Greek Catholic Church
- Education: St. Paul Seminary, Harissa; Lebanese University; Holy Spirit University of Kaslik
- Coat of arms: Youssef Absi's coat of arms

Youssef Absi SMSP (Arabic: يوسف عبسي; Latin: Iosephus Absi; born 20 June 1946, in Damascus, Syria) is a hierarch of the Melkite Greek Catholic Church, who is the current Melkite Catholic Patriarch of Antioch, serving since 21 June 2017.

== Ecclesiastical career ==
On May 6, 1973, Youssef Absi was ordained a priest and became chaplain of the Missionary Society of St. Paul (abbreviated as S.M.S.P.), a Melkite Greek Society of Apostolic Life that is also known as the Pères Paulistes. After the conclusion of philosophical and theological studies at the Major Seminary of St. Paul in Harissa, Lebanon, he obtained a licentiate in philosophy at the Lebanese University, a licentiate in theology at the Institute of St. Paul in Harissa, and a doctorate in musical science and hymnography at the Holy Spirit University of Kaslik.

On June 22, 2001, he was appointed titular archbishop of Tarsus dei Greco-Melkiti and curial bishop and auxiliary bishop in the Melkite Patriarchate. Patriarch Gregory III Laham was his consecrator, and the co-consecrators were Archbishop Jean Mansour, titular archbishop of Apamea in Syria dei Greco-Melkiti, and Archbishop Joseph Kallas, Archeparch of Beirut and Byblos, on September 2, 2001.

From 1999 to 2006, he was Superior General of his religious community, the Missionary Society of St. Paul. He assisted as co-consecrator at the episcopal ordination of Yasser Ayyash, Archbishop of Petra and Philadelphia in Jordan. In October 2007, he was appointed patriarchal vicar for the archdiocese of Damascus.

He was elected on June 21, 2017, as the patriarch of the Melkite Greek Catholic Church. His election came a month after Pope Francis accepted the resignation of Gregory III Laham.

== Other activities ==
In 2001, he became president of the Caritas Syria (Commission Commune de Bienfaisance (CCB)) and forwards with three full-time members more than 40 projects in Damascus, Aleppo and Hassake. He composed for the singer Marie Keyrouz "L'Ensemble de la Paix", a hymn that was released on the album Cantiques de l'Orient.

== On the Middle East ==
As a participant in the Special Assembly of the Synod of Bishops on the Middle East in October 2010, he gave an address in which he insisted that: "The Episcopal Conferences of each country should meet from time to time together. You should allow bi-ritualism, so that no parish remains without divine liturgy, no matter what church it belongs to."

Absi has stated his support for an independent Palestinian state, believing peace in the Middle East impossible without a solution for the Palestinian people.

== Gallery ==
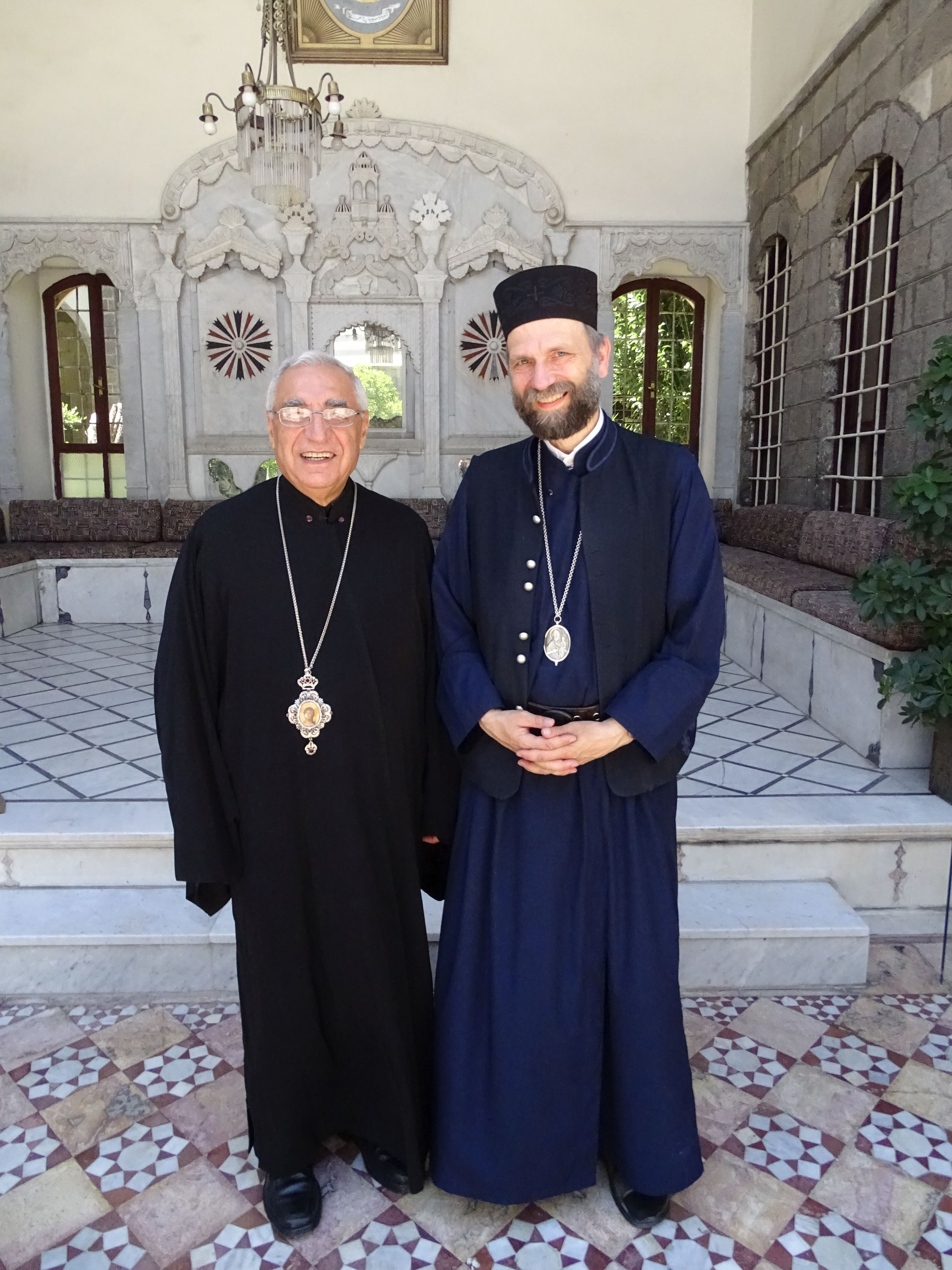
With Péter Fülöp Kocsis in June 2017

== See also ==
- Ibrahim Al-Khalil Convent

Catholic Church titles
Preceded by Lutfy Laham	Titular Archbishop of Tarsus; 2001–2017	Vacant
Preceded by Gregory III Laham	Melkite Greek Patriarch of Antioch; 2017–present	Incumbent
