= Protosyncellus =

Principal deputy of the bishop of an eparchy

A protosyncellus, protosynkellos or protosyngel (Greek: πρωτοσύγκελλος) is the principal deputy of the bishop of an eparchy for the exercise of administrative authority in an Eastern Orthodox or Eastern Catholic church. The equivalent position in the Western Christian churches is vicar general.

== Diocesan vicarial use ==
The protosyncellus is normally a senior priest, archimandrite, chorbishop or auxiliary bishop selected to assist the bishop with his administrative responsibilities. In this capacity the protosyncellus exercises the bishop's executive power over the entire eparchy.

The title derives from the Greek term syncellus (σύγκελλος), from syn, "with", and kellion, "cell" (Latin: cella). Synkellos was a term used in the early Church for those monks or clerics who lived in the same cell with their bishops and whose duty it was to be witnesses to the purity of their lives or to perform the daily spiritual exercises in common with them.

In the Eastern Church, they became the councillors and confessors of the patriarchs and bishops and were much trusted by them. They held the first place after their masters and had a seat and vote in the councils of the Church. In the course of time the patriarchs took two or more syncelli, the most distinguished of whom was called protosynkellos, Latinized as protosyncellus.

== Missionary use ==
Protosyncellus is also the title for the ordinary of an Eastern Catholic Territory dependent on the Patriarch, a missionary pre-diocesan jurisdiction, even if held by or vested in the eparch of an eparchy (full bishopric).
