= New Columbia (Portland, Oregon) =

Housing development in Portland, Oregon, U.S.

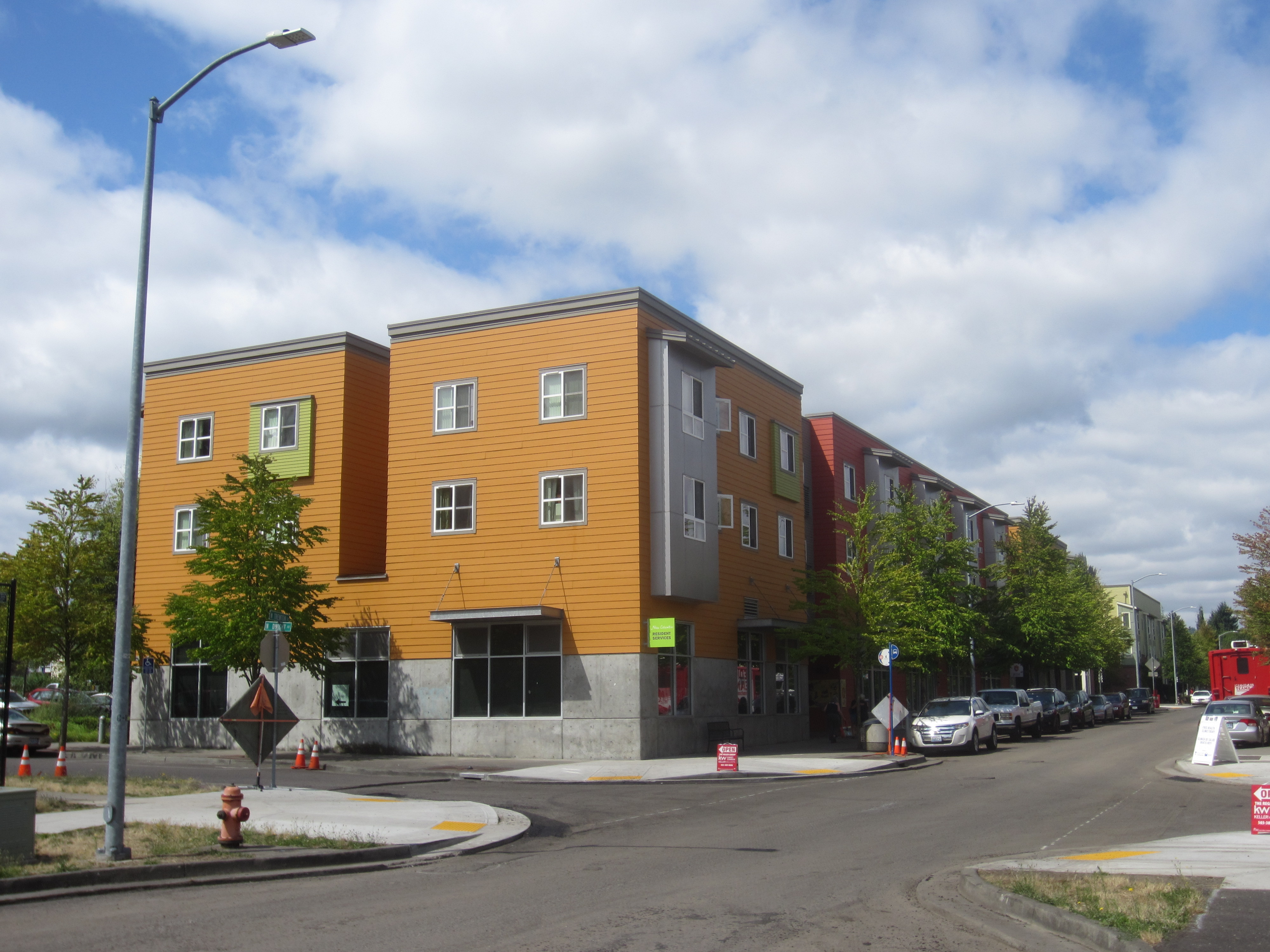
- Buildings in New Columbia, 2019
- Interactive map of New Columbia

General information
- Location: Bounded by N. Columbia Boulevard, N. Houghton Street, N. Woolsey Avenue, and N. Adriatic Avenue; Portland, Oregon, U.S.
- Coordinates: 45°35′23″N 122°42′59″W
- Area: 82 acres (33 ha)
- No. of units: 852

Construction
- Constructed: 1942–1943 (Columbia Villa); 2003–2005 (New Columbia)

Other information
- Governing body: Home Forward

New Columbia is a housing development in the Portsmouth neighborhood of Portland, Oregon, United States. It was previously called Columbia Villa. It is operated by the city's public housing authority, Home Forward, and is the largest public housing development in the state.

== Description ==
New Columbia is Oregon's largest public housing development. It occupies the northeast corner of the Portsmouth neighborhood, bordered on the north by Columbia Boulevard, on the east by Woolsey Avenue, on the south by Houghton Street, and on the west by Adriatic Avenue. It contains McCoy Park and several pocket parks, such as the New Columbia Pocket Park. It is served by Rosa Parks Elementary School and the Charles Jordan Community Center, which hosts the North Portland chapter of the Boys & Girls Club. As of 2019, the development had 1,847 residents. 47% of those are African-American, 26% are Hispanic, and 23% are white.

== History ==
=== Early history ===
The site of New Columbia was originally built as Columbia Villa in 1942 by Home Forward, then called the Housing Authority of Portland (HAP). The Villa was built to house the influx of shipyard workers who came to the area as ship production expanded in response to World War II. The low-density project spread 400 low-rise apartment units over 82 acres with a suburban-style street layout. It would be one of two HAP worker housing projects that would survive after the war as low-income public housing, when the units were converted to low-income housing for veterans at the end of the war. The project maintained a positive public image through the 1960s, being praised for its beauty in a 1962 issue of The Oregonian. However, by 1976, the same newspaper described the area as "an institutional compound".

=== Rise of crime and city response ===
The shift in the 1970s has been attributed to changes in public housing regulations, persistent poverty, and the spread of heroin addiction. A Portland Police gang detective reported that in 1987, a resident alerted him to the presence of members of the Californian 357 Crips in the Tamarack Apartments of Columbia Villa, who were later joined by members of other Californian Crips chapters, and began distributing crack cocaine in the area. The arrival of the drug coincided with further decline in living conditions, as was the case in many public housing neighborhoods across the country. The Villa was then the site of the city's first known drive-by shooting in 1988, when local Crips leader Joseph Ray Winston was murdered at a park on North Woolsey Avenue. Three bystanders were also injured in the shooting. The eponymous Columbia Villa Crips are still recognized by Multnomah County as an active Crips chapter.

In response to rising crime in the neighborhood, the City of Portland, in cooperation with Multnomah County and the State of Oregon, initiated a Community Service Intervention Program focused on reducing crime and the fear of crime, and improving the quality of life in Columbia Villa. The CSIP worked to improve communication between social service agencies and changed police approaches to focus on community policing practices. This effort was also assisted by a coalition of resident activists who tasked themselves with rebuilding community infrastructure. The strategy was widely regarded as successful, and was used as a national model for improving public safety in crime-stricken neighborhoods. However, the stigma carried by the neighborhood would remain, with a 2003 article on the area in Willamette Week referring to it as "Portland's ghetto".

=== Redevelopment as New Columbia ===
In 1994, the HAP moved forward on a plan to completely demolish and rebuild the area with $35 million in funding secured from a federal HOPE VI grant, as well as funding from other sources that brought the project total to $151 million. The HAP cited substandard housing and infrastructure, as well as the street layout's inherently isolating effect on the neighborhood, as factors in the necessity for a complete rebuild. However, in comments about the plan, Portland City Commissioner Erik Sten told the Willamette Week, "there are human problems that no architect or urban planner in the world can design away". The rebuild required nearly 400 families to move away from the area for the construction period between 2003 and 2005. Residents were given the choice between transferring to other public housing or receiving a Section 8 voucher to use in securing privately owned rental housing. Moving, advising, and transportation services were also provided to facilitate residents' moves. In all, the cost of relocation services totaled approximately $4.25 million, with 74 percent of residents opting to receive section 8 vouchers, 23 percent moving to other public housing options, and 3 percent choosing to forego further housing assistance. Residents were still affected by other disruptive factors, such as the fact that 46% of school-age children who relocated had to change schools.

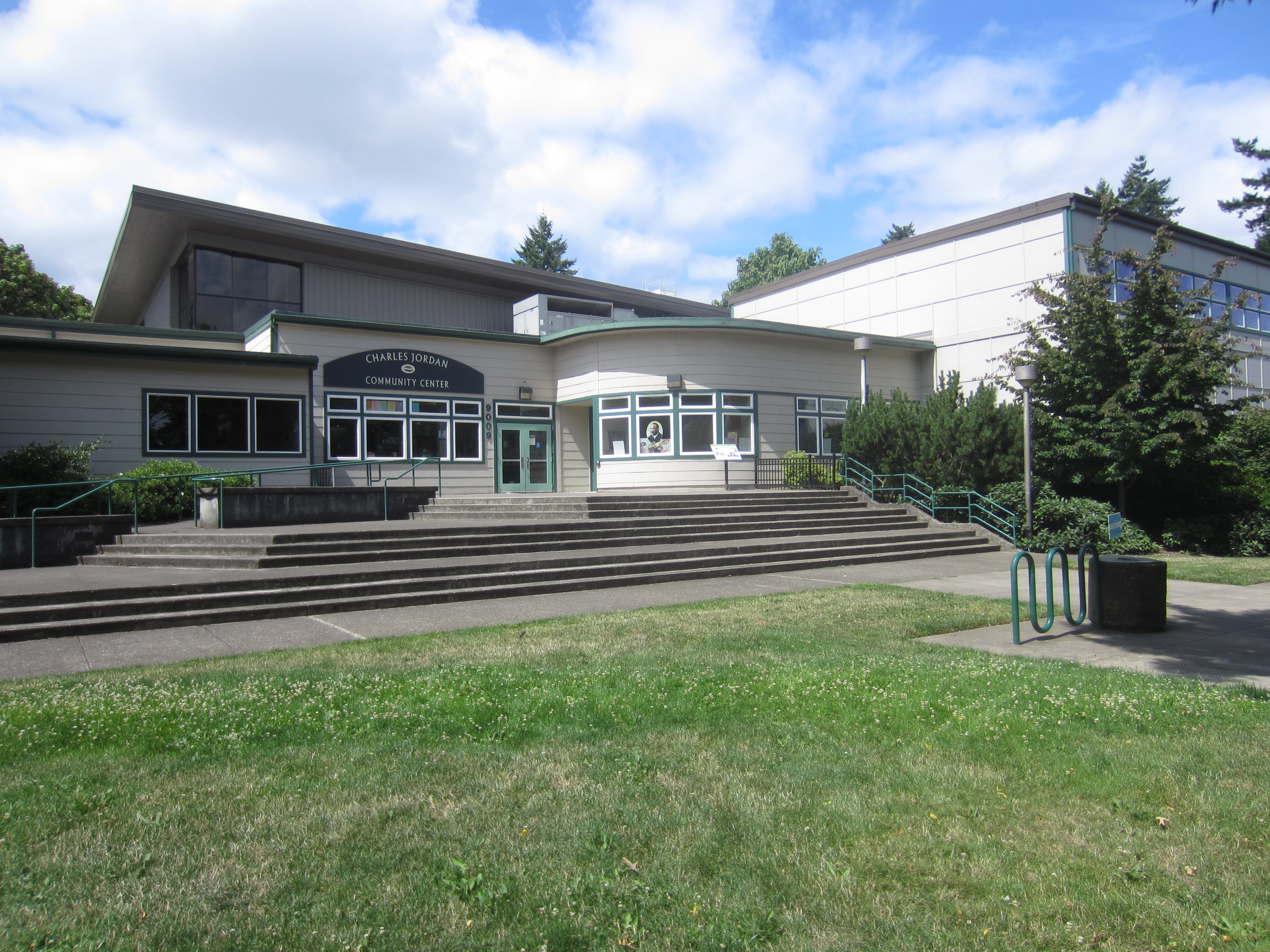
Charles Jordan Community Center

Not all Columbia Villa structures were demolished, and many were salvaged so that building materials could be recycled. Local house moving companies purchased 23 duplexes and moved them to other sites. Concrete and asphalt from old home foundations and street surfaces were salvaged and ground into fill material for structures and road bases in the new construction. In all, 82 percent of building materials from the demolition process were recycled.

The new construction replaced 462 units with 850 units, 200 of which were single-family houses that were sold at market prices. The remaining units were government subsidized low-income apartments. Five different home builders were contracted to build the single-family homes, in an attempt to diversify the appearances of the houses. The project also added McCoy Park, a community center, a life-long learning center, an elementary school, and several retail spaces.

=== Recent history ===
New Columbia has been the subject of criticism from local media and urban planning researchers. One point of criticism was the HAP's decision to list homes at market value while leaving apartments as the only subsidized option for low-income residents. The development has been described as a "public housing island" in criticisms alleging that the goals for community integration put forth by the HAP were never met. Some residents have complained that important notices, including those that affect residency eligibility, are often distributed in English only, in spite of the high number of non-English speaking refugee families in the community. In contrast, the Portland Police Bureau released statistics that showed a much lower crime rate within New Columbia compared to the greater Portsmouth neighborhood, indicating that the development's reputation as the center of criminal activity was no longer accurate.

However, the Villa was not free from the threat of violence. In 2007, the HAP and local gang experts declared that a turf war was developing between gangs in New Columbia. The new complex experienced its first shooting murder in 2010, when a 17-year-old boy was shot in the back by another teenager. In May 2011, an 18-year-old teenager was shot and killed during the night alongside McCoy Park. On June 30, 2014, New Columbia experienced its first drive-by murder since 1994.

Portland Police established the New Columbia Policing Team in 2012 in an effort to improve community perceptions of police through face-to-face interactions with residents, including during follow-up investigations. The team places a focus on connecting residents to social services and arbitrating issues between neighbors and family members. A resident Home Forward employee who reported serving as an unofficial liaison between residents and police stated that the team's work had resulted in more residents reporting incidents directly to the police, rather than anonymously through her. However, tensions with police continued. In 2013, officers assigned to the team came under public scrutiny for arresting a 9-year-old girl and taking her to police headquarters in Downtown Portland for fingerprinting and mugshots after she got in a fight with another child at the Boys & Girls Club.

== Community programs ==
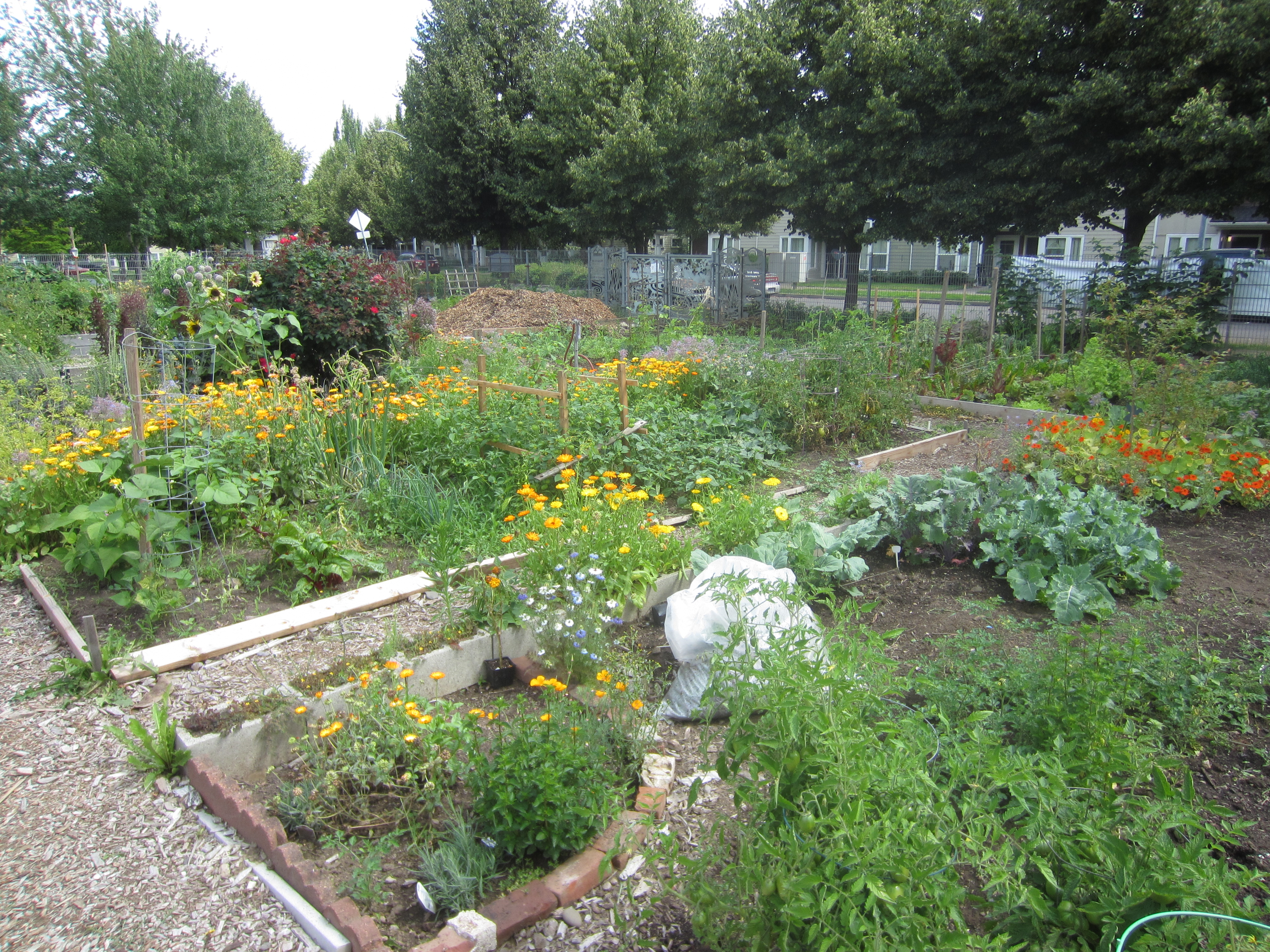
Village Gardens (2019)

The development offers various community programs intended to raise the quality of life for its residents. The Resident Community Builder program allows residents in good standing to assist in organizing and facilitating community activities in exchange for sliding-scale financial compensation. Community Builders assist with the community newsletter, town hall meetings, litter cleanup, and event planning. They also help facilitate other programs, such as the K-CHING Youth Employment Program, which is a paid work experience program for 11-17 year-olds in the community.

One historical problem faced by New Columbia was its status as a low-income community paired with its status, according to the city and the USDA, as a food desert. Planners included a grocery retail space in the development, but its first two occupants, Big City Produce and AJ Java, went out of business. A non-profit community grocery store called the Village Market now occupies the space. Even after the opening of closeout chain Grocery Outlet in nearby St. Johns, Village Market reported growing sales.

Village Gardens is a community gardening program which provides residents with access to garden plots. The Market Gardener Program assists residents in using these plots to grow produce which can be sold at the New Columbia Farmers Market, the St. Johns Farmers Market, and Village Market. Organizers claimed that in 2016, sales from the program cycled nearly $12,000 into the neighborhood. The Portland Fruit Tree Project also worked alongside Village Gardens organizers to plant a community orchard of 20 fruit trees adjacent to the garden, as an addition to the garden project's existing stand of 14 trees.

The Oregon Food Bank organizes and provides assistance to local teenage volunteers to run a food bank program called New Columbia Harvest Share. The food bank is designed to look like a traditional farmer's market. Volunteers complete a food literacy program and participate in organizing the food bank through a Youth Community Advisory Board. Many participating students incorporate their volunteer experiences and related learning into their college admissions applications and scholarship essays.

== Portrayal in film ==
Multiple documentaries have featured the development. "Imagining Home" by Sue Arbuthnot and Richard Wilhelm focuses on the transition between Columbia Villa and New Columbia, financial struggles of businesses in the community, and neighborhood tensions between homeowners and renters. "Killingsworth" by Tom Olsen Jr. focuses on the life of Portland Crips leader Anthony Branch Jr., including many aspects of early Portland gang development which took place in Columbia Villa.
