= Joseph K. Carson =

American politician (1891–1956)

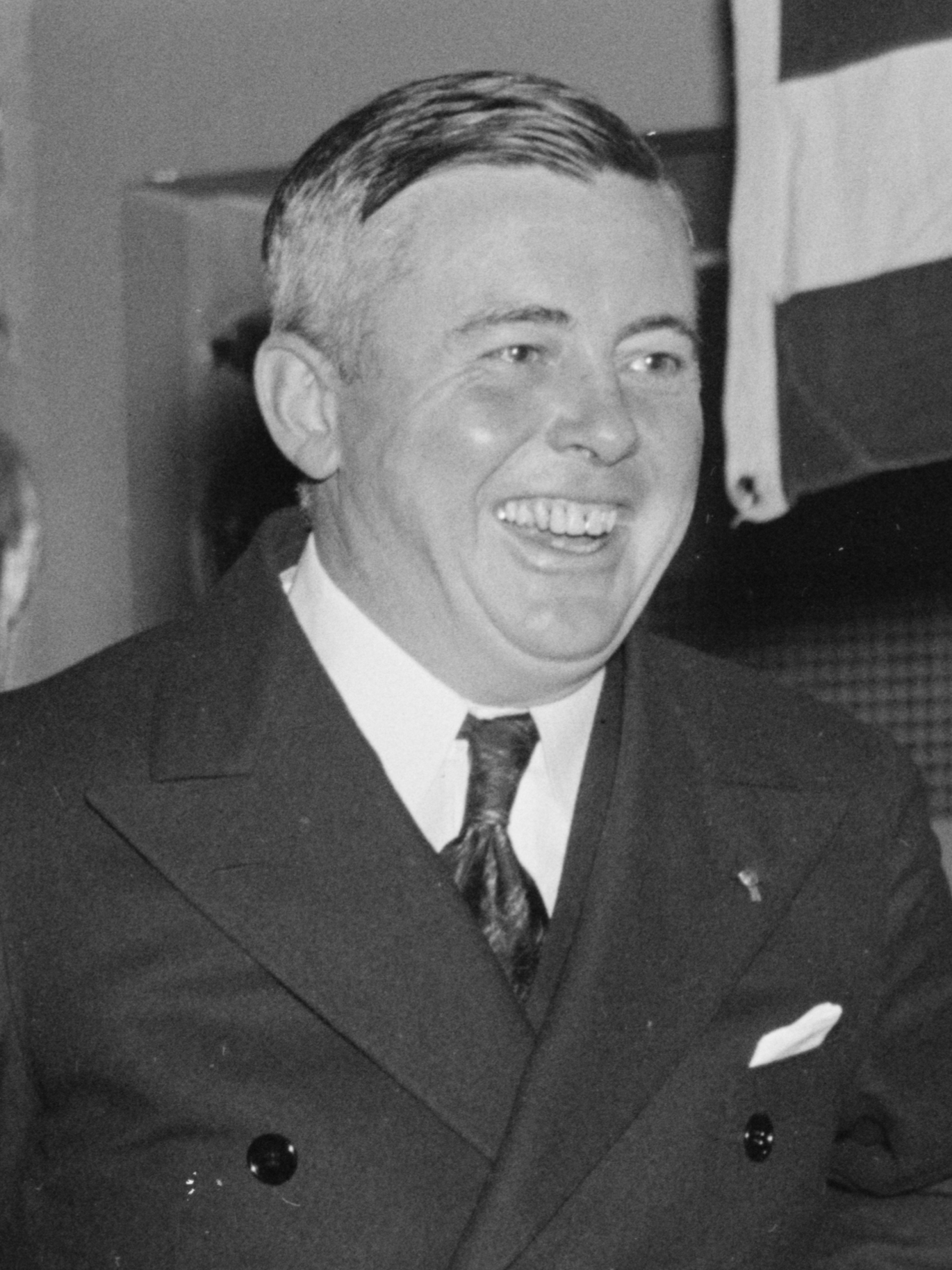
- Carson in 1937

40th Mayor of Portland, Oregon
- In office 1933–1941
- Preceded by: George Luis Baker
- Succeeded by: Earl Riley

Personal details
- Born: December 19, 1891 McKinney, Kentucky, U.S.
- Died: December 20, 1956 (aged 65) Portland, Oregon, U.S.
- Party: Democratic
- Profession: Attorney

Joseph Kirtley Carson Jr. (December 19, 1891 – December 20, 1956) was a mayor of Portland, Oregon from 1933 to 1941 as well as an attorney and unsuccessful candidate for governor.

== Early life ==
Joseph Kirtley Carson Jr. was born on December 19, 1891, in the village of McKinney, Kentucky, the son of Joseph Kelly Carson and Sallie Elizabeth Adeline (Johnson). His family moved several times before arriving in Hood River, Oregon in 1903. Joseph graduated from high school in Hood River, and then moved to Portland in 1914.

He graduated from the University of Oregon School of Law on May 4, 1917. On the same day he was admitted to the Oregon State Bar he also joined the 12th Company of the Oregon regiment of coast artillery. He served as a private at Fort Stevens at the mouth of the Columbia River. He made sergeant in August 1917. He served at Fort Stevens and Fort Canby until February 1918. His next service was at Fort Monroe in Virginia. In April 1918 he traveled to Florida to serve as an instructor at Camp Joseph E. Johnston where he was promoted to second lieutenant. In World War I he was sent on the U.S.S. Kroonland to France where he landed in October 1918. He served with the 301st railhead detachment, and was discharged in October 1919 with the rank of first lieutenant.

== Early political career ==
In 1922, Carson was elected a Democratic precinct committeeman. He was an unsuccessful candidate for the Oregon state legislature in 1922, 1924, and 1926. In 1928 he was a candidate to represent a congressional district at the Democratic National Convention. Arriving back in Oregon he began a correspondence with Franklin Delano Roosevelt that would last four years.

== Mayor of Portland ==
When George Luis Baker chose not to try for re-election as mayor, Joseph decided to run. He was elected November 8, 1932, to take office July 1, 1933. One of his first acts was to appoint his former coastal artillery colonel Berton K. Lawson as police chief of Portland.

Carson was mayor of Portland during the depression. He became a vocal critic of the Works Progress Administration. A conservative Democrat who believed in rugged individualism, he stopped several New Deal initiatives. Government deficit spending was anathema to him. He set the tone at a Rotary Club meeting in 1932: "We must quit asking the government to be a nurse to everything. We must realize that the people support the government, not that the government supports the people".

A waterfront strike of longshoremen in 1934 was considered by Carson to be the most unpleasant event of his mayoral administration.

== Post mayoral career ==
Carson did not seek re-election in 1940 but instead returned to private law practice. He served in World War II, retiring as a full colonel in 1945.

He was appointed by President Harry S. Truman to the United States Maritime Commission in 1947 until the commission was abolished and replaced in 1950. He then became the vice president of the Propeller Club of the United States, headquartered in New York. He returned to his law practice in Portland in 1953 and in the 1954 Oregon gubernatorial election, he was the Democratic nominee for governor but lost to Paul L. Patterson in the general election.

== Personal life ==
Carson married his first wife, Hazel Irene Jenkins of Pendleton, Oregon on March 26, 1926. She died of tuberculosis on May 4, 1928. He became the first and thus far the only mayor of Portland to be married while in office when he married Myrtle Cradick of Portland in the White Temple on June 19, 1937. They had one daughter, Mrs. Richard (Joan) Staley, and one son, Lucian Joseph (August 10, 1939 – January 19, 1990). His wife Myrtle died on February 25, 1982.

He served as the president (Commander?) of the state American Legion in 1941. He also belonged to the Last Man Club, the Hood River Lodge, Ancient, Free and Accepted Masons, York Rite bodies of Masonry, the University Club of Portland, the Arlington Club, Columbia Edgewater Country Club, Woodmen of the World, Delta Theta Phi, and the state and Multnomah County bar association.

As a young man, he enjoyed playing baseball. He was appointed the first Oregon state chairman of junior baseball for the American Legion. He had a great interest in biography (his favorite work was The Life of John Marshall by Albert J. Beveridge), and portraits of the presidents were hung in his law offices.

Carson died of a coronary thrombosis suffered at his home on the morning of December 20, 1956.

Political offices
Preceded by George Luis Baker	Mayor of Portland, Oregon; 1933–1941	Succeeded by Earl Riley
Party political offices
Preceded by Austin F. Flegel	Democratic nominee for Governor of Oregon; 1954	Succeeded by Robert D. Holmes
