= Star Theater (Portland, Oregon) =

American silent film theater

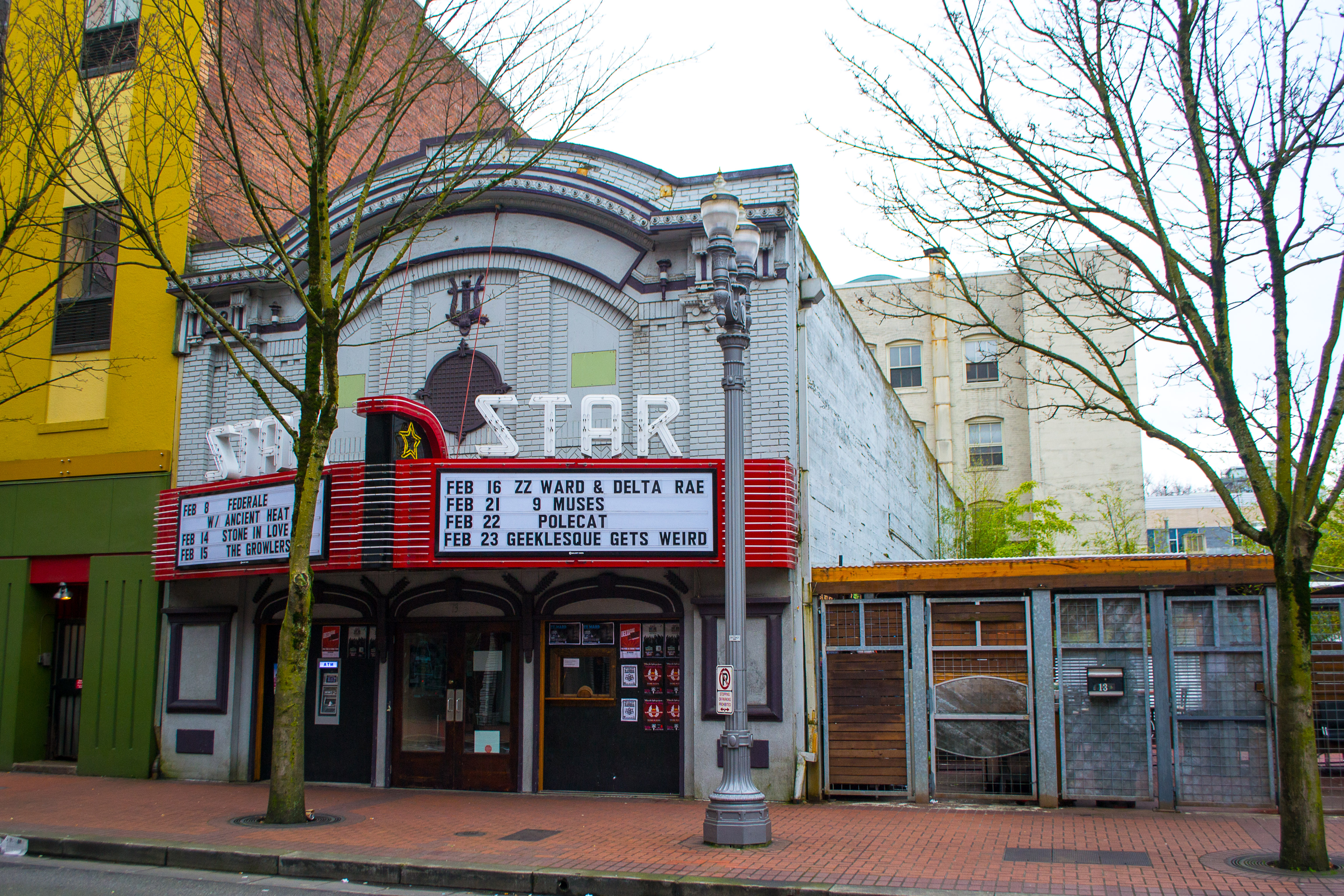
- The venue's front entrance, 2013
- Interactive map of Star Theater
- Former names: Princess Theatre; 4 Star Theatre; New Star Theatre
- Address: 13 Northwest 6th Avenue; Portland, Oregon; United States
- Coordinates: 45°31′25″N 122°40′35″W
- Capacity: 500

Construction
- Opened: 1911

Website
- Venue Website

The Star Theater, formerly known as Princess Theatre and several other names, is a historic former silent film theater in Portland, Oregon, United States. The theater currently operates as a live music and performance space; in the past, it has operated as a film theater as well as a burlesque theater and an adult movie theater.

== History ==
It opened in May 1911 as the Princess Theatre at Sixth and Burnside Street, with 300 seats. It was one of many "semi-fireproof picture shows" that opened that year in Portland and the first in downtown Portland to comply with the new fire codes. It was run by the Sax Amusement Company circa 1923; it became the Star Theater in 1939 but was also known as the Star Burlesk, 4 Star Theater, or New Star Theater at various times.

In the 1940s, it became a live burlesque theater. Tempest Storm was one of the dancers. It closed briefly during Dorothy McCullough Lee's mayorship but reopened in 1953. Jim Purcell, Portland's Chief of Police, was a regular at the Star Theater.

In the late 1960s, the Star Theater became an adult theater which showed erotic movies and also had strippers on stage. In the 1970s, the Star Theater experimented with presenting everything from underground and classic comedy films to controversial "live sex shows." Eventually, the Star Theater went back to somewhat less controversial adult movies and live strippers. The Star Theater was closed around 1975.

The property was owned for several years by Portland film director Gus Van Sant. Van Sant sold it to "embattled restaurateur" Andrew Sugar in 2001.

The theater briefly reopened as another nightclub called Five Star Theater, which held some shows in October 2008 but then was shut down again on September 27, 2009, by the Portland Police Bureau and the Oregon Liquor Control Commission for selling alcohol without a liquor license and violating building codes. Local news outlet KATU described Five Star as a modern speakeasy.

As of 2011, the theater seating and original interior have been removed.

== See also ==
- Culture of Portland, Oregon
