= Terry Schrunk =

American politician

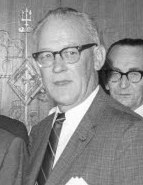

44th Mayor of Portland, Oregon
- In office January 1, 1957 – January 1, 1973
- Preceded by: Fred L. Peterson
- Succeeded by: Neil Goldschmidt

26th President of the United States Conference of Mayors
- In office 1968–1969
- Preceded by: Joseph M. Barr
- Succeeded by: Jack D. Maltester

Sheriff of Multnomah County, Oregon
- In office 1949–1957
- Preceded by: M. L. Elliott

Personal details
- Born: March 10, 1913; Stayton, Oregon, U.S.
- Died: March 4, 1975 (aged 61); Portland, Oregon, U.S.
- Political party: Democratic
- Profession: Politician

Terrence Doyle Schrunk (March 10, 1913 – March 4, 1975) was an American politician who served as the mayor for the city of Portland, Oregon, 1957–1973, a length tying with George Luis Baker, who also served 16 years (1917–1933).

Schrunk was appointed sheriff of Multnomah County in 1949 by the county commissioners, succeeding M. L. Elliott, who was removed from office in a recall election. Schrunk was subsequently outright elected to the office,

In his 1956 campaign for mayor, Schrunk advocated for urban renewal. Schrunk beat incumbent Fred L. Peterson by 17,000 votes in a nine-person primary, but did not get an absolute majority, and then beat Peterson in the fall run-off election. He took office at midnight on January 1, 1957.

In 1968 and 1969, he served as president of the United States Conference of Mayors.

Terry's son, Mike Schrunk, was elected district attorney of Multnomah County in 1981, and is thought to be the longest-serving district attorney in Oregon history.

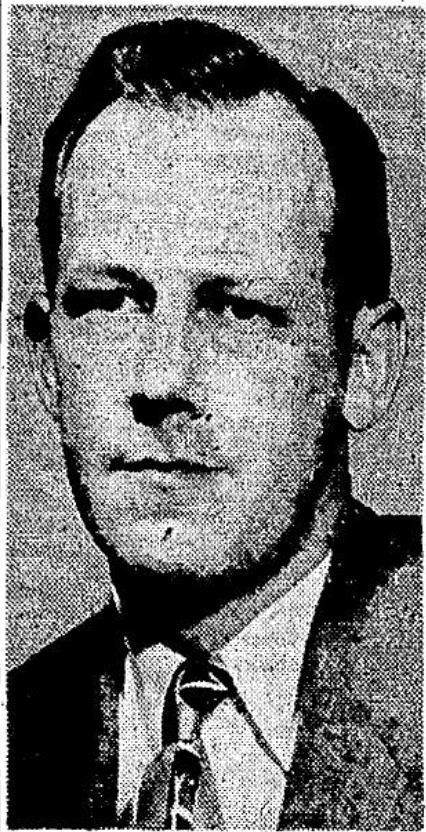
Schrunk when serving as sheriff in 1956

== Mayor ==
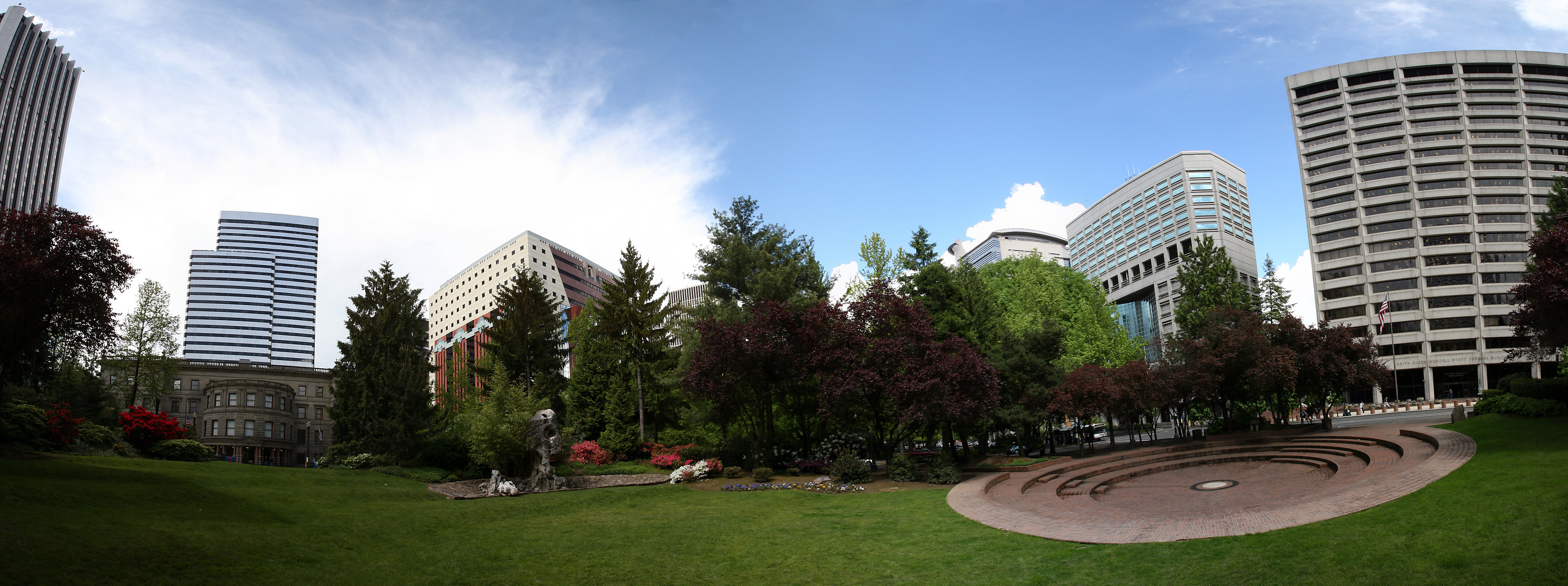
Terry Schrunk Plaza in Portland, Oregon.

In mid-twentieth-century Portland, gambling dens, brothels, and unlicensed bars operated virtually uninhibited by police as long as vice racketeers paid scheduled kickbacks to key city law enforcement officials.

Schrunk was elected mayor with Teamsters union support, allegedly in part because the incumbent Republican mayor, Fred Peterson, offended the union when he wouldn't oust Police chief J. Bardell Purcell. The Teamsters felt that Purcell impeded their drive to open a wider vice business in Portland.

In 1957 he appeared as himself in the CBS documentary film The Day Called 'X' and on September 2 of that year, as reported by the Oregonian on its September 4, 1957, edition, was seen in the front seat of a Lincoln convertible as he and the then biggest star in the world of music, the 22-year-old Elvis Presley saluted the 14,600 fans waiting for his concert to start at Providence Park (known at that time as Multnomah Stadium).

An allegation against Mayor Schrunk soon landed him before the special Senate committee headed by Arkansas Democrat John McClellan investigating U.S. labor racketeering in March 1957. While still sheriff in September 1955, Schrunk and his deputies had raided the 8212 Club, a gambling and after-hours drinking joint financed by Portland Racketeer James B. Elkins. Elkins testified that the manager, Clifford Bennett, told him he had paid Schrunk $500, and the sheriff had gone away without causing any more trouble—except for arresting a few drunks. Although Bennett refused to testify, several others confirmed pieces of the story. Schrunk flatly denied having taken bribes from Bennett. But he did admit that his deputies had raided the 8212 Club, seen liquor being illegally served after hours, spotted gambling equipment all over the place—and that he had gone away without taking further action.

Robert F. Kennedy, then the lead attorney for the Senate committee, came to Portland to testify against him. Jurors acquitted Schrunk in less than two hours.

Three years later, Kennedy was managing his brother, Senator John F. Kennedy's, presidential campaign, with Oregon one of seven primaries that JFK entered. Kennedy's pursuit of Schrunk had angered enough Oregon Democrats that some of JFK's key supporters persuaded Kennedy operative Joseph S. Miller to ask Senator Kennedy to keep his younger brother out of Oregon. Although JFK largely accepted the advice, Miller's bluntness angered both brothers. Continued resentment by Schrunk and his supporters was seen as a contributing factor to Robert Kennedy losing the Oregon Democratic Primary to Eugene McCarthy in May 1968.

In 1968 and 1969, he served as the president of the United States Conference of Mayors.

Schrunk was initiated as a member of Tau Kappa Epsilon fraternity at Portland State University.

Schrunk suffered a heart attack in October 1972 while at City Hall and was taken to the hospital where he survived.

Schrunk died after suffering another heart attack in 1975, at age 61.

== See also ==
- Government of Portland, Oregon
- List of mayors of Portland, Oregon

Political offices
| Preceded by Fred L. Peterson | Mayor of Portland, Oregon; 1957–1973 | Succeeded by Neil Goldschmidt |
