= Housing authority =

Type of ministry or government agency

A housing authority or ministry of housing is generally a governmental body that governs aspects of housing or (called in general "shelter" or "living spaces"), often providing subsidies and low rent or free public housing to qualified people. The existence of government agencies specifically concerned with ensuring that housing is available to people living in the country is a comparatively modern development, with the first such agencies being established in U.S. cities in the 1930s, the height of the Great Depression.

== Specific housing authorities ==
- Hong Kong Housing Authority
- Singapore Housing and Development Board
- Ministry of Housing, Communities and Local Government (UK, since 2006)
- Ministry of Housing and Local Government (UK, historic)
- United States Department of Housing and Urban Development
- United States Housing Authority (United States, historic)
  - Boston Housing Authority
  - Chicago Housing Authority
  - Home Forward, formerly the Housing Authority of Portland
  - Housing Authority of the City of Los Angeles
  - New York City Housing Authority
  - San Francisco Housing Authority
- Housing and Property Development Authority, Nigeria
- Toronto Community Housing Corporation
- Department of Building and Housing (New Zealand), formerly the Ministry of Housing, New Zealand
- Department of Housing, Local Government and Heritage, Republic of Ireland
- Northern Ireland Housing Executive
- Ministry of Local Government Development, Malaysia
- Ministry of Housing, Sweden

== See also ==
- Public housing
