= Louisa Flowers =

Civic leader in Portland, Oregon

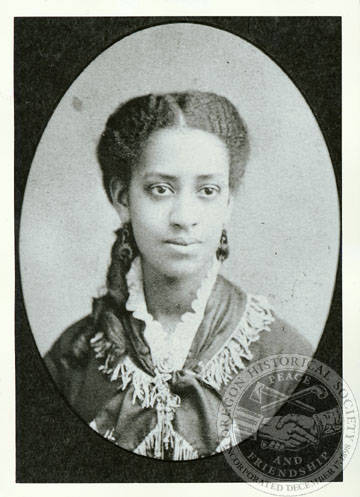
- Portrait of Louisa Flowers at age 23.
- Born: Louisa Thatcher c. 1849; Boston, Massachusetts, U.S.
- Died: 1928 (aged 78–79)
- Resting place: Lincoln Memorial Park, Portland Oregon
- Monuments: Louisa Flowers Affordable Housing
- Occupations: farmer, land owner
- Organization(s): NAACP, YWCA
- Spouse: Allen Ervin Flowers
- Children: 4

Louisa Flowers (c. 1849–1928) was a civic leader and property owner in Portland, Oregon where she was a resident for 45 years.

== Life ==
Louisa Thatcher was born in Boston, Massachusetts in about 1849. In 1882, she married Allen Ervin Flowers in Victoria, British Columbia, and moved to Portland. They had four sons: Lloyd, Elmer, Ralph, and Ervin. Allen Flowers worked at the U.S. Customshouse and became the porter-in-charge on the Portland to Seattle run of the Northern Pacific Railroad.

Allen Ervin Flowers was a former cabin boy on the Brother Jonathon before jumping ship in 1865 at port. After a brief period of hiding along the river as the ship cleared port, he joined the small, but growing, African American community in Portland.

When Flowers moved to Portland, she and husband Allen joined the city’s small African American community, which numbered fewer than 500 people. They purchased a farm in the Lents area where they raised horses and grew raspberries; their house became a gathering space for Portland’s small Black community and they hosted members of the three early Black churches.

Flowers and her husband purchased and built several houses in the old Lower Albina Neighborhood; these properties were located close to the building named in her honor in the Lloyd District. Allen Ervin Flowers famously constructed a road on NE Schuyler, becoming Portland's first Black developer in the process, to ensure that Louisa could safely wheel her baby buggy to Union Avenue.

== Community involvement ==
Flowers was instrumental in establishing Portland’s Black community on the east side of the Willamette River and developing the lower Albina area. Her family’s civic leadership and economic prosperity helped them become pillars of Portland’s small African American community. She served on Bethel AME deaconess board and was a charter member of both the NAACP and the Williams Avenue YWCA.

She was a member of the Rosebud Club (also called the Old Rose Club), which was a Black women’s club that eventually became part of the Oregon Federation of Colored Women's Clubs. One important activity for the club was to raise money for a scholarship fund to help young women attend college.

== Death and legacy ==
Flowers died in 1928 and was buried at Lincoln Memorial Park in Portland, Oregon; she had lived in Portland for 45 years. In recognition of her contributions to the city, the housing agency Home Forward named one of its properties after her; it is in the area known as Lower Albina and is on land she purchased near NE First Avenue and NE Schuyler Street.

The Louisa Flowers Apartments are 12 stories and are financed by low-income housing tax-credits.
