= Jim Purcell =

American chief of police (1909–1968)

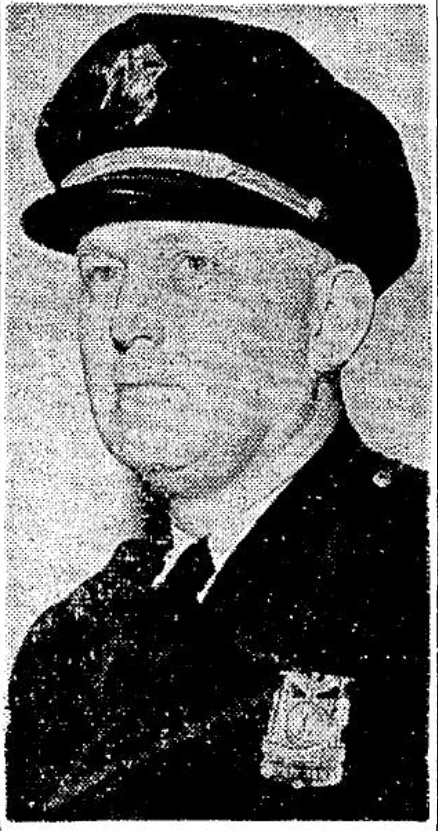
Purcell as police chief

"Diamond" Jim Purcell (1909 – 1968) was an officer, chief detective, and then the Chief of Police in Portland, Oregon from January 1, 1953 to December 31, 1956.

Purcell was an associate of Portland mob boss Jim Elkins, and he helped protect Portland's pinball racket and other organized crime activity in the city. In this regard, Purcell was not unique among public servants in Portland, many of whom did business with Elkins. He was indicted, but Portland mayor Fred L. Peterson declined to remove him as chief.

Purcell, later chief detective and police chief, was clearly linked with mobster Jim Elkins and described later as "He was very good at derailing investigations and covering up murders. Jim Elkins... paid Purcell well for his services."

Purcell resigned as chief at the end of 1956, returning to the rank of captain and taking charge of the city jail. He was succeeded by William J. Hilbruner, who was appointed by incoming mayor Terry Schrunk.
