= Allen Ervin Flowers =

Property developer in Portland, Oregon

- Born: March, 20, 1847; Columbus, Ohio, U.S.
- Died: 1934 (aged 86–87)
- Spouse: Louisa Flowers
- Children: 4

Allen Ervin Flowers was the first African-American developer in Portland, Oregon and a pioneer.

He was husband to Louisa Flowers. He was a resident of Portland for 68 years.

== Life ==
Allen Ervin Flowers was born in Columbus, Ohio on March 20, 1847.

Flowers was a cabin boy aboard the Brother Jonathon before jumping ship in 1865 as the ship docked in Portland.

Flowers waited in the nearby brush until the ship cleared port before he joined the growing African American community in Portland. Flowers worked for a time at the Lincoln Hotel as a bus boy, then worked in 1880 for the U.S. Customs House. In 1885, Flowers began working for the Northern Pacific Railroad as a porter-in-charge. He worked with the railroad until 1900.

He married Louisa Thacker in 1882 and had four sons, Lloyd, Ervin, Elmer, and Ralph. Flowers became the first Black developer in Portland when he constructed NE Schuyler Street so that his wife could get a baby buggy to Union Avenue, the only through street to the Willamette River at the time.

In 1901, the Flowers's moved with their four sons to a 20-acre farm located by the north slope of Mount Scott. There, they farmed and raised cattle.

After establishing himself in his community, purchasing and building many properties, and raising his family, Flowers died in 1934.

== Community involvement ==
Flowers and his wife were active members of their community. They were members of the Bethel African Methodist Episcopal Church where Louisa Flowers served on the Bethel AME deaconess board.

== Property ==
The Flowers built three houses, at 1803, 1811, and 1815 NE 1st Avenue, for their family and other relatives. These homes were located in the Eliot neighborhood, a location informed by Flowers profession as a porter-in-charge for the Northern Pacific Railroad. Flowers lived in one of the houses until his death in 1934. Before their demolition in 2019, the homes were owned by Pauline Bradford, a resident of the Eliot neighborhood and member of the Eliot Neighborhood Association.
