= MV PFC William B. Baugh =

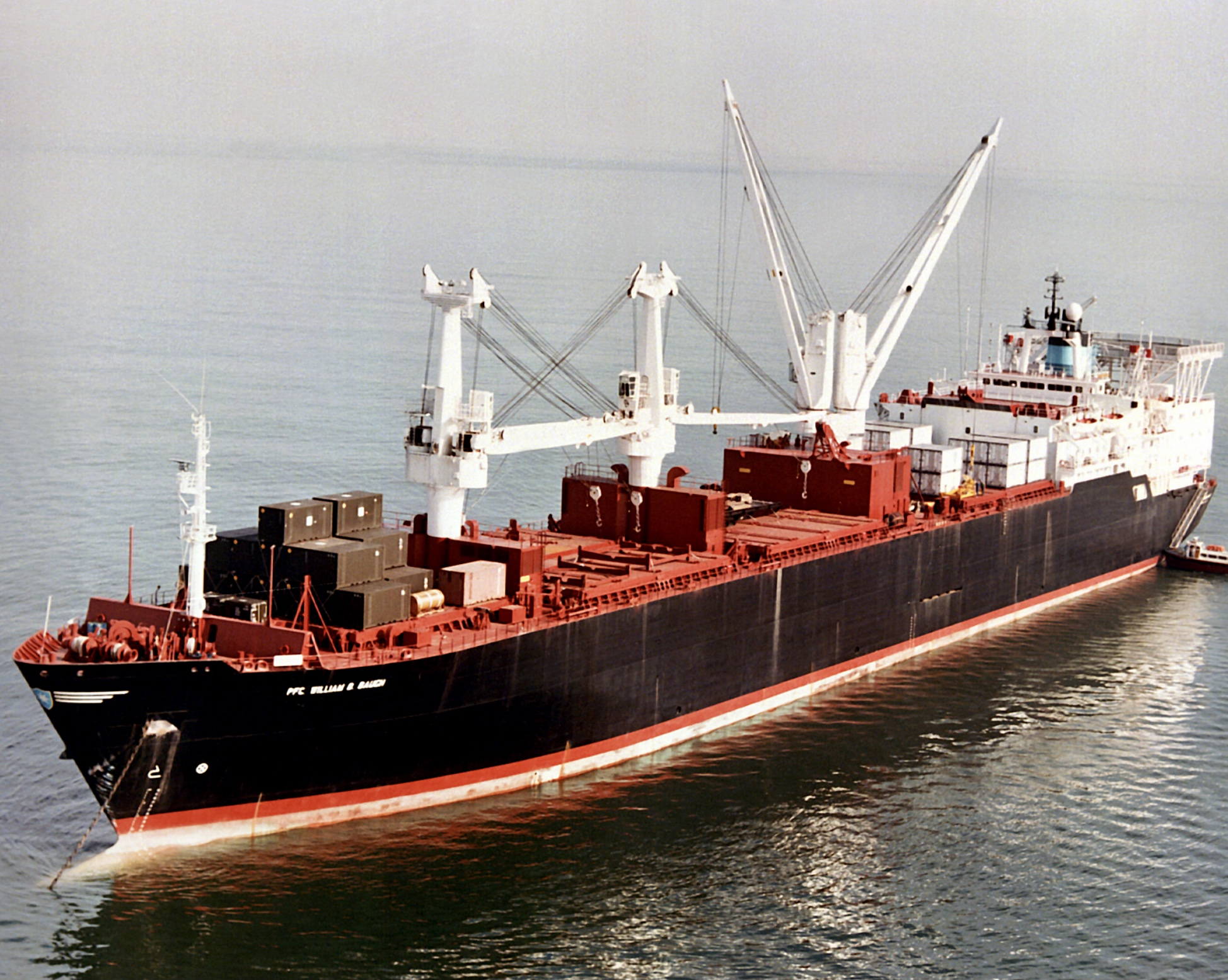
PFC William B Baugh

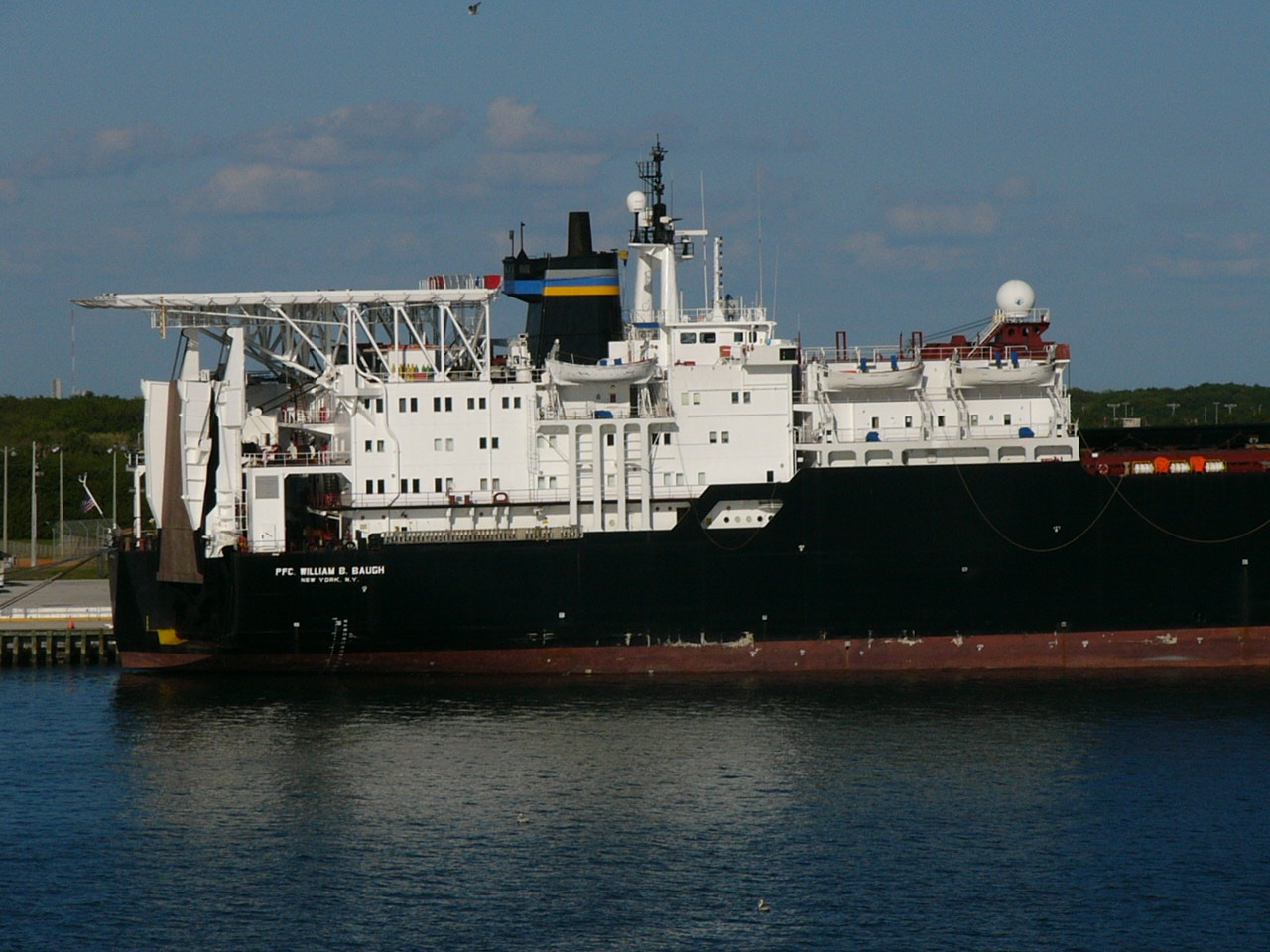
Close-up of the PFC William B Baugh. There is a helipad in the back of the ship.

MV PFC William B. Baugh (AK-3001) was one of the Strategic sealift ships of the U.S. Military Sealift Command. Built as the Eleo Maersk in 1979, it was purchased by the United States Maritime Administration in 1983, and underwent conversion for service as a strategic sealift ship. In this role it was renamed in honor of Private First Class William B. Baugh, a U.S. Marine who was awarded a Medal of Honor in the Korean War for sacrificing his life to save his comrades. The ship was of the class known as the Corporal Louis J. Hauge Jr. class and was part of a prepositioning program of the U.S. Navy that deployed supply ships in key areas prior to actual need. The ship was 755 feet long and had a top speed of 17.5 knots. It was removed from service in 2008, and reverted to Maersk for commercial service, being renamed Maersk Texas. In 2017 it was scrapped in China.
