= McKinney, Kentucky =

Unincorporated community in Kentucky, United States

- Census-designated place
- Location within Kentucky Location within the United States
- Coordinates: 37°27′11″N 84°45′28″W
- Country: United States
- State: Kentucky
- County: Lincoln

Area
  - Total: 0.42 sq mi (1.10 km^{2})
  - Land: 0.42 sq mi (1.09 km^{2})
  - Water: 0.0039 sq mi (0.01 km^{2})
- Elevation: 1,030 ft (310 m)

Population (2020)
  - Total: 201
  - Density: 476.4/sq mi (183.95/km^{2})
- Time zone: UTC-5 (Eastern (EST))
  - Summer (DST): UTC-4 (EDT)
- ZIP code: 40448
- Area code: 606
- GNIS feature ID: 2629653

McKinney is a census-designated place in Lincoln County in south-central Kentucky. McKinney is located along Kentucky Route 198 and the Norfolk Southern Railway, 8.6 miles (13.8 km) southwest of Stanford. McKinney has a post office with ZIP code 40448. As of the 2020 census, McKinney had a population of 201.

== Demographics ==
Historical population
Census	Pop.	Note	%±
2020	201		—
U.S. Decennial Census

== Notable people ==
- Arthur W. Allen, surgeon, medical educator, and author who served as the president of the American College of Surgeons, Massachusetts Medical Society, and the Boston Medical Library.
- William B. Baugh, awarded a Medal of Honor for his actions in the Korean War
- Robert R. Martin, Kentucky educator and politician
- Harry Camnitz, professional baseball player.
- Joseph K. Carson, Jr., 40th mayor of Portland, Oregon
