= 1954 Oregon gubernatorial election =

- November 2, 1954
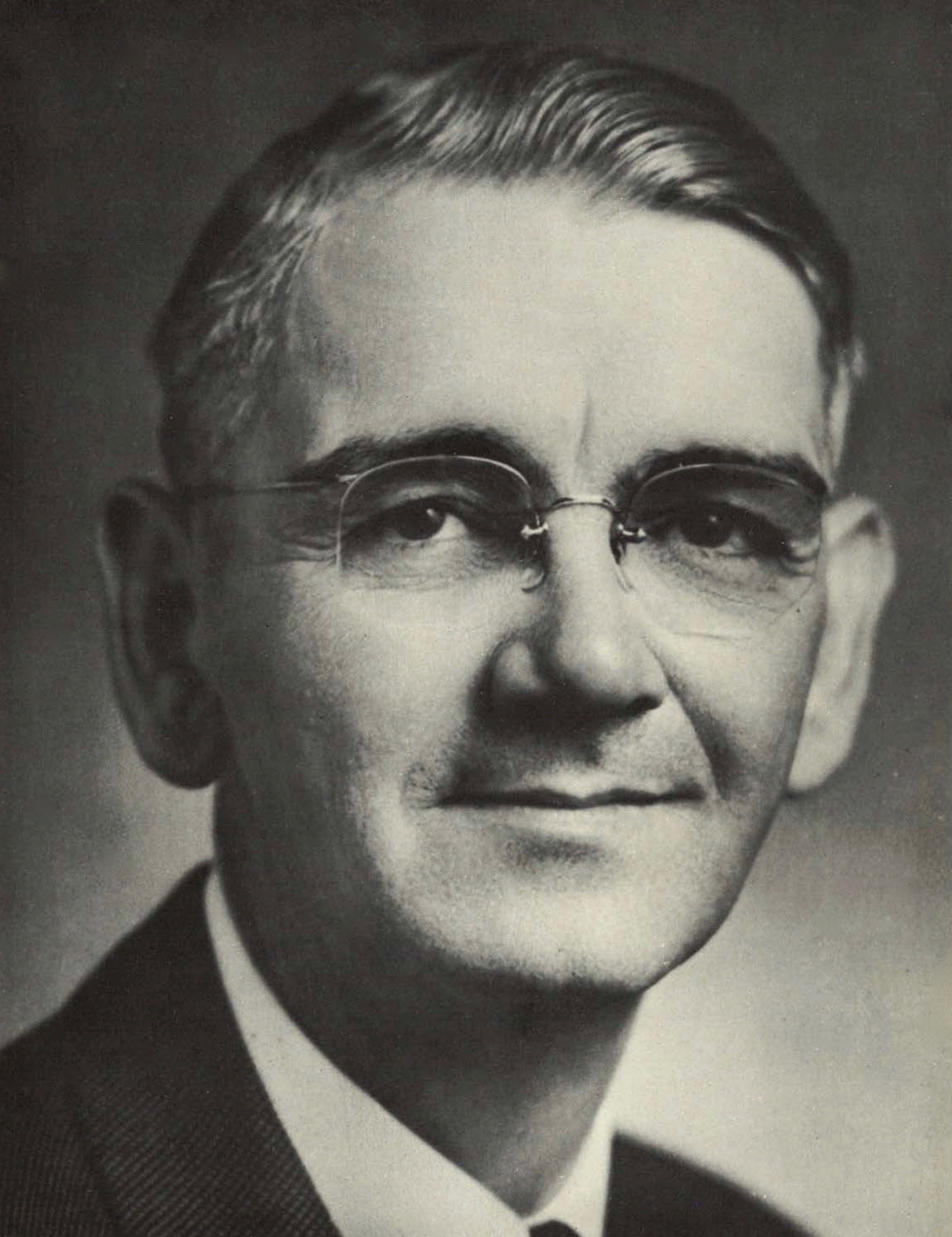

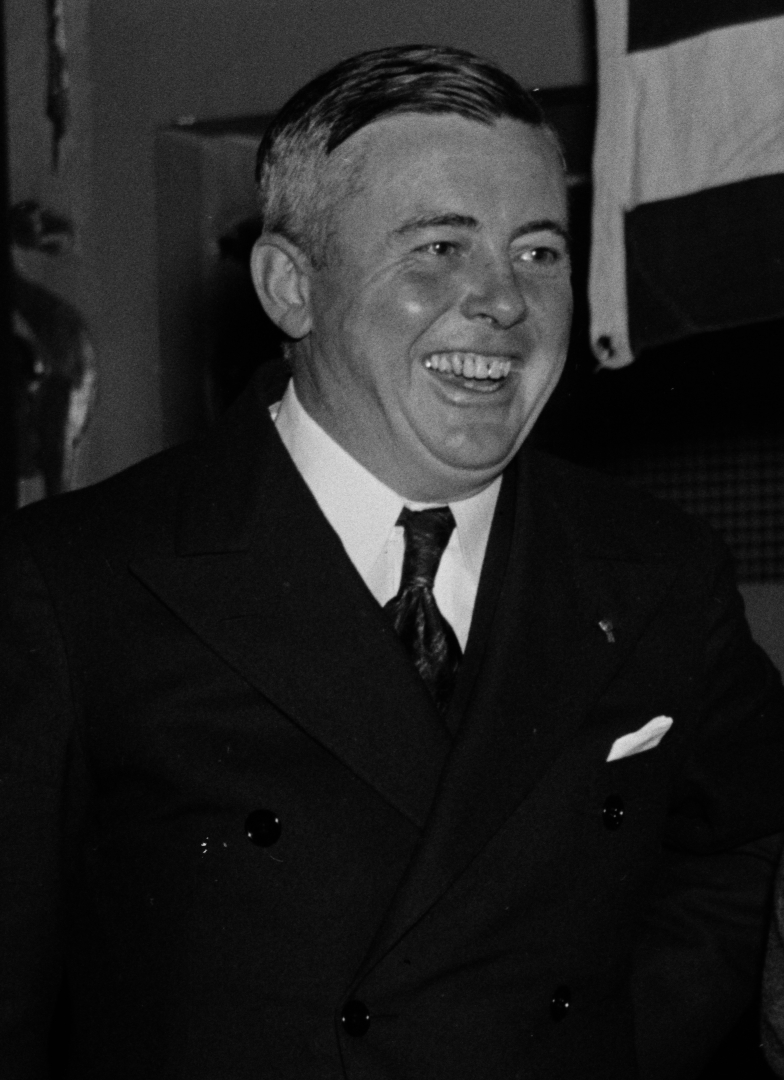
Nominee	Paul L. Patterson	Joseph K. Carson
Party	Republican	Democratic
Popular vote	322,522	244,170
Percentage	56.91%	43.09%
- County results Patterson: 50–60% 60–70% 70–80% Carson: 50–60%
Governor before election
Paul L. Patterson
Republican
Elected Governor
Paul L. Patterson
Republican

The 1954 Oregon gubernatorial election took place on November 2, 1954. Republican incumbent Paul L. Patterson defeated Democratic nominee Joseph K. Carson to win the election. Earl T. Newbry unsuccessfully sought the Republican nomination.

== Primary election ==
Oregon held primary elections on May 21, 1954.

=== Republican party ===
==== Candidates ====
- Earl T. Newbry, Secretary of State of Oregon
- Paul L. Patterson, incumbent governor

==== Results ====
Republican primary results
Party	Candidate	Votes	%
Republican	Paul L. Patterson (inc.)	146,211	73.77%
Republican	Earl T. Newbry	51,991	26.23%
Total votes		198,202	100.00%

=== Democratic party ===
==== Candidates ====
- Joseph K. Carson, former Mayor of Portland

==== Results ====
Democratic primary results
Party	Candidate	Votes	%
Democratic	Joseph K. Carson	123,199	100.00%
Total votes		123,199	100.00%

== General election ==
=== Results ===
1954 Oregon gubernatorial election
Party	Candidate	Votes	%	±%
Republican	Paul L. Patterson (inc.)	322,522	56.91%	−9.14%
Democratic	Joseph K. Carson	244,170	43.09%	+9.14%
Total votes		566,701	100.00%	
Majority		78,343	13.82%	
Republican hold		Swing	-18.28%	

=== Results by county ===
County	Paul L. Patterson Republican		Joseph K. Carson Democratic		Margin		Total votes cast
County	#	%	#	%	#	%	Total votes cast
Baker	3,048	48.47%	3,240	51.53%	-192	-3.05%	6,288
Benton	7,328	71.42%	2,933	28.58%	4,395	42.83%	10,261
Clackamas	19,506	56.34%	15,113	43.66%	4,393	12.69%	34,619
Clatsop	5,939	54.49%	4,960	45.51%	979	8.98%	10,899
Columbia	3,557	44.52%	4,433	55.48%	-876	-10.96%	7,990
Coos	6,579	45.60%	7,848	54.40%	-1,269	-8.80%	14,427
Crook	1,716	58.21%	1,232	41.79%	484	16.42%	2,948
Curry	1,666	60.34%	1,095	39.66%	571	20.68%	2,761
Deschutes	3,689	56.31%	2,862	43.69%	827	12.62%	6,551
Douglas	10,133	58.26%	7,261	41.74%	2,872	16.51%	17,394
Gilliam	641	61.05%	409	38.95%	232	22.10%	1,050
Grant	1,420	59.71%	958	40.29%	462	19.43%	2,378
Harney	1,098	59.19%	757	40.81%	341	18.38%	1,855
Hood River	2,511	58.92%	1,751	41.08%	760	17.83%	4,262
Jackson	12,840	59.71%	8,665	40.29%	4,175	19.41%	21,505
Jefferson	966	59.26%	664	40.74%	302	18.53%	1,630
Josephine	5,574	61.85%	3,438	38.15%	2,136	23.70%	9,012
Klamath	7,374	52.23%	6,744	47.77%	630	4.46%	14,118
Lake	1,549	60.16%	1,026	39.84%	523	20.31%	2,575
Lane	26,695	58.90%	18,629	41.10%	8,066	17.80%	45,324
Lincoln	4,111	50.70%	3,998	49.30%	113	1.39%	8,109
Linn	9,715	56.06%	7,615	43.94%	2,100	12.12%	17,330
Malheur	3,838	61.74%	2,378	38.26%	1,460	23.49%	6,216
Marion	22,403	64.78%	12,182	35.22%	10,221	29.55%	34,585
Morrow	941	59.48%	641	40.52%	300	18.96%	1,582
Multnomah	107,748	54.66%	89,388	45.34%	18,360	9.31%	197,136
Polk	4,923	61.35%	3,102	38.65%	1,821	22.69%	8,025
Sherman	675	70.53%	282	29.47%	393	41.07%	957
Tillamook	3,894	57.49%	2,879	42.51%	1,015	14.99%	6,773
Umatilla	7,890	57.04%	5,943	42.96%	1,947	14.08%	13,833
Union	3,145	48.02%	3,404	51.98%	-259	-3.95%	6,549
Wallowa	1,386	51.81%	1,289	48.19%	97	3.63%	2,675
Wasco	3,371	49.84%	3,393	50.16%	-22	-0.33%	6,764
Washington	17,282	64.93%	9,336	35.07%	7,946	29.85%	26,618
Wheeler	506	52.65%	455	47.35%	51	5.31%	961
Yamhill	6,865	63.91%	3,876	36.09%	2,989	27.83%	10,741
Total	322,522	56.91%	244,179	43.09%	78,343	13.82%	566,701

==== Counties that flipped from Republican to Democratic ====
- Baker
- Columbia
- Coos
- Union
- Wasco
