= Earl Riley =

American politician

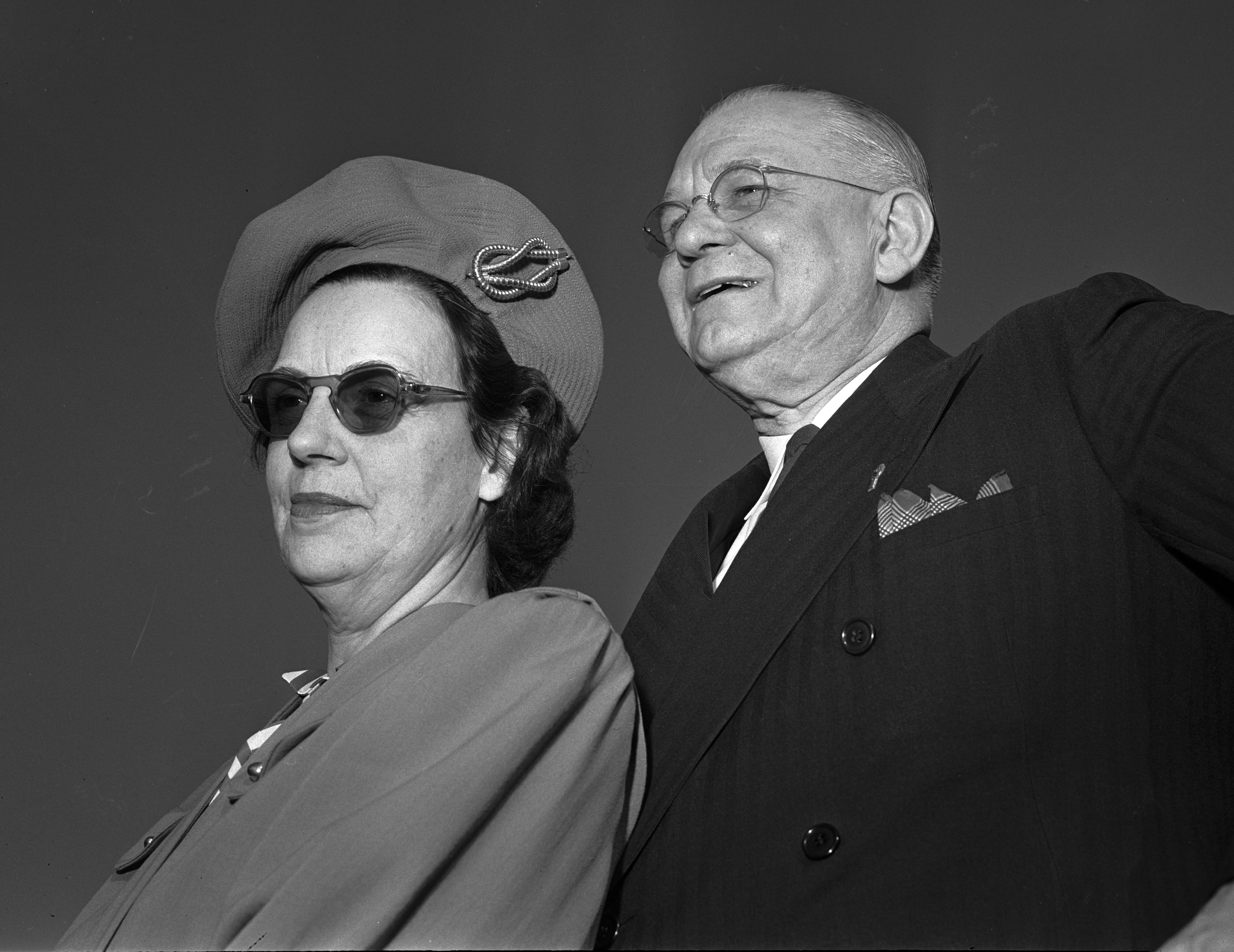
- Fay and Earl Riley, 1947

41st Mayor of Portland, Oregon
- In office January 1941 – December 1948
- Preceded by: Joseph K. Carson
- Succeeded by: Dorothy McCullough Lee

18th President of the National League of Cities
- In office 1946
- Preceded by: Wilson W. Wyatt
- Succeeded by: Woodall Rodgers

Portland Commissioner of Finance
- In office 1930–1940

Member of the Portland Civil Service Commission
- In office 1928–1930

Personal details
- Born: February 18, 1890 Portland, Oregon, U.S.
- Died: August 17, 1965 (aged 75) Portland, Oregon, U.S.
- Profession: Businessman

Robert Earl Riley (February 18, 1890 – August 17, 1965), better known as "Earl Riley", was an Oregon politician and businessman, and mayor of Portland, Oregon, United States, from 1941–1949.

== Early life, education, and early career ==
Riley was born on February 18, 1890, in Portland, Oregon, to Harriett Miranda (Richardson) and Lester N. Riley. His father was a fire bureau captain and his grandfather ran a tannery at Multnomah Stadium (now Providence Park).

Riley graduated from the Portland Academy in 1907, attended Oregon State College 1908–1910, and later the Holmes Business College in Portland. As a second lieutenant he served at the 4th Officers Training School 1918–1919. He was the superintendent of the Columbia Engine Works machine shop 1919–1931.

== Civil Service Commission and City Council ==
Riley's political career began with appointment in 1928 to Portland's civil service commission, on which he served through 1930. Two years later, while he was serving as a partner in a tire company, he was named to fill a vacancy on the city council. He served on the council as commissioner of finance from 1930–1940.

== Mayor of Portland ==
In November 1940, he won his first election to mayor, and was re-elected in 1944. In 1943, the United States Office of War Information and the British Ministry of Information sent Riley to Europe to tour war-torn cities and boost morale as a "typical American mayor". Perhaps he was a typical American mayor, but in 1945 Riley was charged by the influential City Club of Portland with negligence in stamping out vice and corruption. Two years later, the Portland Ministerial Alliance repeated the charges. According to historian E. Kimbark MacColl, Riley had a secret vault in his City Hall office to store his percentage of vice protection payments. In the book Vanishing Portland, the Bottenbergs reported that the Portland police were collecting $60,000 a month in protection payments from gambling and prostitution operations, with much of this money going to Riley. Despite denials of laxness in his administration, Riley lost his third mayoral campaign to the reformer Dorothy McCullough Lee.

In December 1944, Riley would expel half of the Romani population from the city, asserting that "some people will say the gypsies are colorful . . . but after a while any town will reach the end of its patience."

In 1946, Riley served as president of the National League of Cities.

After the war, Riley openly declared the city could absorb only a minimum of Negros without upsetting its regular life.

In its 1965 obituary of Riley, The Oregonian called him "a tough, able and demanding administrator and a wizard at municipal financing". Commissioner William A. Bowes described him as a man willing to work 18 and 20 hours a day.

== Later career ==
After his mayoral loss, Riley told his friends he was through with politics. He acquired a Packard automobile dealership. The business failed when the car ceased production, and he became a car salesman for a competitor, Barnard Motors. He was an active civic leader, with an interest in the Shriner's Hospital for Crippled Children and the Easter Seals campaigns. He retired from business in 1959 after suffering a serious heart attack.

== Personal information ==
Riley was known as a flashy cigar-chewing man. He is described in his draft records as brown-haired and blue-eyed. He met his future wife, E. Fay Wade, while the two were attending Oregon State College, and they married on March 25, 1920.

Besides the Shriner's he also belonged to the American Legion, Moose International, Fraternal Order of Eagles, Rotary International, Woodmen of the World, Royal Order of Jesters, Phi Delta Theta, Neighbors of Woodcraft, the Multnomah Athletic Club, and was a 33rd Degree Freemason. He was also a Baptist.

Riley died at the age of 75 of a heart attack at his home on August 17, 1965. He is buried at Portland’s Lone Fir Cemetery. After her husband's death, Fay Riley moved to Richardson, Texas, to be with her daughter, Dorislee and son-in-law Rieves Hoffpauer. She died in Dallas, Texas, on July 25, 1968, and is buried at Lone Fir Cemetery, next to her husband.

Preceded by Joseph K. Carson Jr.	Mayor of Portland, Oregon; 1941–1949	Succeeded by Dorothy McCullough Lee
