= Harry Camnitz =

American baseball player (1884–1951)

- Pitcher
- Born: October 26, 1884; McKinney, Kentucky, U.S.
- Died: January 6, 1951 (aged 66); Louisville, Kentucky, U.S.
- Batted: Right Threw: Right

MLB debut
- September 29, 1909, for the Pittsburgh Pirates

Last MLB appearance
- October 3, 1911, for the St. Louis Cardinals

MLB statistics
- Win–loss record: 1–0
- Earned run average: 3.00
- Strikeouts: 3
- Stats at Baseball Reference

Teams
- Pittsburgh Pirates (1909); St. Louis Cardinals (1911)

Henry Richardson Camnitz (October 26, 1884 – January 6, 1951) was an American pitcher in Major League Baseball. He played briefly for the Pittsburgh Pirates and St. Louis Cardinals. He also compiled a 99–88 career record in eight seasons in the Minor Leagues, including 27 wins for the McKeesport Tubers in 1909. He was the brother of Howie Camnitz, also a pitcher in the Major Leagues.
