= Jim Elkins (criminal) =

American mobster

James Butler Elkins (1901–1968) was a crime boss in Portland, Oregon, in the mid-20th century.

Elkins was involved in numerous illegal activities for several decades in the mid-20th century. He reportedly ran gambling rackets and nightclubs like the 8212 Club and was known for his brutality. His testimony, supported by over 70 hours of audio recordings of conversations he made on his own, was a prominent feature in the McClellan Committee investigations into organized crime that commenced in 1957.

Elkins' audio recordings resulted in indictments of Portland mayor Terry Schrunk and Multnomah County District Attorney William Langley, although both were acquitted. Portland Chief of Police Jim Purcell was also indicted. Purcell was later described as "He was very good at derailing investigations and covering up murders. Jim Elkins... paid Purcell well for his services."

== Early life ==
Elkins spent the first 30 years of his life involved in crimes including manufacturing moonshine, shooting a security guard in Arizona, possessing narcotics, and organizing gambling. Around 1936, Elkins came to Portland to help his brother Fred Elkins manage his small prostitution ring. Fred collected money from the business and Jim paid bribes to the police department in exchange for protection from the law.
