= Jack D. Maltester =

American politician

Mayor of San Leandro, California
- In office 1958–1978

27th President of the United States Conference of Mayors
- In office 1969–1970
- Preceded by: Terry Schrunk
- Succeeded by: James Tate

Vice Mayor of San Leandro, California
- In office 1956–1958

Member of the San Leandro City Council
- In office 1956–1958
- Preceded by: Helen Lawrence
- In office 1948

Personal details
- Born: August 6, 1913
- Died: May 1, 2009 (aged 95)
- Political party: Democratic

Jack Dent Maltester (August 6, 1913 – May 1, 2009) was mayor of San Leandro, California, from 1958 to 1978.

== Biography ==
Jack D. Maltester was born in 1913 in San Leandro, California and was of Irish and Northern Italian descent.

Maltester was appointed to the San Leandro City Council in 1948, to replace Helen Lawrence when she was selected mayor of that city by the City Council. Lawrence became Maltester's mentor in city government. Maltester served until the election of April, when he lost his seat. In 1956, Maltester was elected to the City Council, and then selected to be vice mayor by the City Council. In 1958, he was selected to be mayor by the City Council.

In 1962, Maltester became the first Mayor of San Leandro to be elected by popular ballot. He was re-elected three times, in 1966, 1970 and 1974.

In 1963, responding to the national Civil Rights Movement, Maltester proposed a Committee on Human Rights and Responsibilities. The City Council rebuffed this initiative three times. He testified on housing discrimination at a hearing of the U.S. Commission on Civil Rights on May 6, 1967. Throughout the sixties, Maltester and the City Council lowered the city's tax rates to offset rising property assessments.

Maltester served as the president of the United States Conference of Mayors (USCM) from 1969 to 1970. In 1971 he sponsored a resolution at the annual USCM meeting in Philadelphia, entitled "Withdrawal from Vietnam and Reordering of National Priorities", which called upon President of the United States Richard Nixon "to do all within his power to bring about a complete withdrawal of all American forces from Vietnam by December 31, 1971." Speaking in support of the resolution, Maltester said,

Although, never brought before the voters of San Leandro, Maltester insisted;

I might ask you: Have we left anything up until now to the military experts or have we been running a political war in Vietnam? My city, a small city in California with less than 70,000 people, proposed this resolution and it is supported by the citizens of the community. It is not a resolution of condemnation. It is not offered in rancor. It is a positive statement of principle. To support this position, I believe, is an obligation none of us can ignore in the name of humanity. I ask your vote for an end to this war.

The resolution was adopted by the body of mayors after vigorous debate that included speeches by conference guest speakers John Kerry and John O'Neill. New York City Mayor John Lindsay and Chicago Mayor Richard J. Daley, whom Maltester greatly admired, were among those who voted for the resolution.

In 1972, Maltester was a prominent member of Democrats for Nixon, supporting President Nixon's re-election campaign, saying the president was doing "a tremendous job of building a country that is moving toward a peaceful prosperity."

In 1973, Robert W. Crown, who represented the district including San Leandro in the California State Assembly, was struck and killed by an automobile while jogging in Alameda. Maltester ran to represent the vacant seat for the 14th Assembly District, but lost to Crown aide and San Leandro Unified School District Board member Bill Lockyer in the Democratic primary election.

In April 1974, voters passed a charter amendment limiting City Council members and the mayor to two consecutive terms, preventing Maltester from running for a fifth consecutive term. When his final term expired, Maltester had served as mayor for 20 consecutive years. During his term, the San Leandro shoreline and marine recreational area were developed, a library was built and BART extended a line to the city. After leaving the mayor's office, Maltester became a "consultant" to various businesses who wished to do business in the City of San Leandro.

Maltester remained active in San Leandro business and politics, serving terms as President of the San Leandro Chamber of Commerce and the California League of Cities. In 1992, the channel leading into the San Leandro Marina was named the "Jack D. Maltester Channel".

Maltester died on May 1, 2009, at the age of 95.

In attendance at his funeral were State of California Treasurer Bill Lockyer and State Senator Ellen Corbett. Former Alameda County Sheriff Charles "Charlie" Plummer gave a eulogy in praise of Maltester, recounting with fondness about the day, despite barely knowing Maltester, he was invited to have lunch with Maltester. When Plummer arrived at the restaurant he asked why was he invited since he barely knew Maltester, to which Maltester replied; "Because you're running for Sheriff".
