= William B. Baugh =

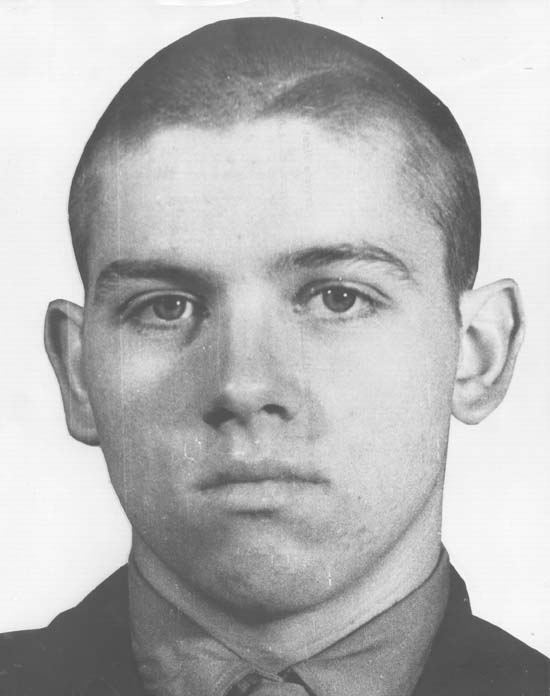
- Private First Class William Baugh
- Born: July 7, 1930; McKinney, Kentucky, US
- Died: November 29, 1950 (aged 20); Chosin Reservoir, Korea
- Burial place: Glen Haven Cemetery, Harrison, Ohio
- Military career
- Allegiance: United States
- Branch: United States Marine Corps
- Service years: 1948–1950
- Rank: Private First Class
- Units: Company G, 3rd Battalion, 1st Marines, 1st Marine Division
- Conflicts: Korean War: Battle of Inchon; UN September 1950 counteroffensive; Second Battle of Seoul; UN offensive into North Korea; Battle of Wonsan; Second Phase Offensive; Battle of Chosin Reservoir (DOW)
- Awards: Medal of Honor; Purple Heart

William Bernard Baugh (July 7, 1930 – November 29, 1950) was a United States Marine who, at age 20, received the Medal of Honor for his actions at the Battle of Chosin Reservoir in the Korean War.

The nation's highest decoration for valor was presented to Baugh for extraordinary heroism on November 29, 1950, between Koto-ri and Hagaru-ri, when he protected the members of his squad from a grenade by smothering it with his body.

== Biography ==
Private First Class Baugh was the 15th Marine to receive the Medal of Honor for heroism during the Korean War. Born July 7, 1930, in McKinney, Kentucky, William Bernard Baugh was employed by Harrison Shoe Corporation before his enlistment in the Marine Corps on January 23, 1948, at the age of 17. Baugh attended public schools in Butler County, Ohio.

Following recruit training at Parris Island, South Carolina, PFC Baugh was stationed at Marine Corps Base Camp Lejeune, North Carolina, and after being transferred to the 1st Marine Division in Korea, took part in the Inchon landing, the capture of Seoul, and the Wonsan and Chosin Reservoir campaigns. His death occurred in the Chosin area.

In addition to the Medal of Honor, PFC Baugh posthumously received the Purple Heart Medal. He previously held the Presidential Unit Citation, Navy Occupation Service Medal with Europe Clasp, Korean Service Medal with three bronze stars, and the United Nations Service Medal.

== Medal of Honor citation ==
The President of the United States in the name of The Congress takes pride in presenting the MEDAL OF HONOR posthumously to

PRIVATE FIRST CLASS WILLIAM B. BAUGH
UNITED STATES MARINE CORPS

for service as set forth in the following CITATION:

For conspicuous gallantry and intrepidity at the risk of his life above and beyond the call of duty while serving as a member of an Anti-Tank Assault Squad attached to Company G, Third Battalion, First Marines, First Marine Division (Reinforced), during a nighttime enemy attack against a motorized column en route from Koto-Ri to Hagaru-ri, Korea, on November 29, 1950. Acting instantly when a hostile grenade landed in his truck as he and his squad prepared to alight and assist in the repulse of an enemy force delivering intense automatic-weapons and grenade fire from deeply entrenched and well-concealed roadside positions, Private First Class Baugh quickly shouted a warning to the other men in the vehicle and, unmindful of his own personal safety, hurled himself upon the deadly missile, thereby saving his comrades from serious injury or possible death. Sustaining severe wounds from which he died a short time afterward, Private First Class Baugh, by his superb courage and valiant spirit of self-sacrifice, upheld the highest traditions of the United States Naval Service. He gallantly gave his life for his country.

HARRY S. TRUMAN

== Awards and decorations ==

1st row	Medal of Honor		Purple Heart
2nd row	Combat Action Ribbon Retroactively Awarded, 1999	Presidential Unit Citation with 2 Service stars	Marine Corps Good Conduct Medal
3rd row	Navy Occupation Service Medal with 'Europe' clasp	National Defense Service Medal	Korean Service Medal with 6 Campaign stars
4th row	Republic of Korea Presidential Unit Citation	United Nations Service Medal Korea	Korean War Service Medal Retroactively Awarded, 2003

== Honors ==
- The Military Sealift Command ship MV PFC William B. Baugh (T-AK-3001) is also named in his honor.

== See also ==
- List of Medal of Honor recipients
- List of Korean War Medal of Honor recipients
