= Dorothy McCullough Lee =

American politician (1901–1981)

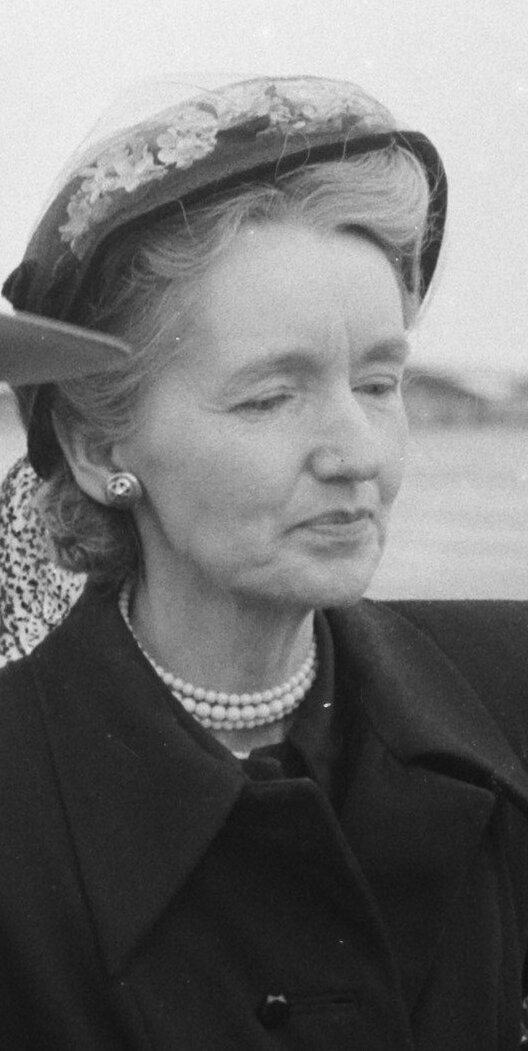

42nd Mayor of Portland, Oregon
- In office January 1, 1949 – January 1, 1953
- Preceded by: Earl Riley
- Succeeded by: Fred L. Peterson

Personal details
- Born: April 1, 1901 Oakland, California, U.S.
- Died: February 19, 1981 (aged 79) Portland, Oregon, U.S.
- Party: Republican

Dorothy McCullough Lee (April 1, 1901 – February 19, 1981) was an American politician and attorney in the U.S. state of Oregon. She was the first female mayor of Portland, Oregon; she also served on the Oregon Legislative Assembly, on the Multnomah County Commission, and on the United States Parole Commission.

== Early life ==
Dorothy McCullough was born in Oakland, California, on April 1, 1901. She was the only child of Flora (née Hill) and Frank E. McCullough, who became a rear admiral in World War I. Her early life involved a great deal of travel, including Hawaii, the Philippines, Japan, China, Guam, and much of Europe. When her father was stationed in Washington, D.C., as assistant surgeon general, she sneaked out at night to listen intently to the suffrage debates in Congress.

Her formal education was limited until she entered Rogers High School in Newport, Rhode Island, where she graduated at age 16. She was determined to become an attorney (against her parents' wishes). She earned a B.A. during her pre-law education from the University of California, Berkeley, in the spring of 1921 and a J.D. degree at the same institution in June 1923.

She was admitted to the State Bar of California in January 1923 and practiced law in San Francisco until July 1924. She married William Scott Lee on June 11, 1924, and moved to Portland, Oregon, where her husband, a chemical engineer, became an executive for the Standard Oil Company. McCullough Lee was admitted to the Oregon State Bar in October 1924 and began a small private legal practice in December. In 1931, she and Gladys M. Everett created Oregon's first all-woman law firm, opening their firm in Portland's Failing Building.

== Oregon political career ==
Dorothy McCullough Lee was a representative in the Oregon House of Representatives for two terms from 1929-1931. She was appointed by the Multnomah County Commission to a vacated seat, and then won a seat in the Oregon Senate, where she served from 1932 to 1943.

Lee resigned from the Oregon Senate to assume the vacant city council seat of Clark D. Van Fleet, appointed to her by Mayor Earl Riley (on the recommendation of the man who became her most consistent opponent, commissioner Fred. L. Peterson). She vacated her law practice, then in the American Bank Building, to devote her full attention to city business. She became the first woman on the Portland City Council and was the commissioner of public utilities.

In office, she extended city water, modernized the traction system (battles with the Portland Traction Company earned her the nickname "Dauntless Dottie"), and applied United States Department of War methods, including the loan of a U.S. Army bomber, to effectively control mosquitoes. She won an election for her city council seat in 1944. The city council rotated the president of the council position when the mayor was out of town. She became, technically, the first female mayor on January 16, 1946, when Mayor Riley was out of town.

After a scandal in the mayor’s office involving Earl Riley and police officers and bribery, Lee was petitioned to run for office. She ran for and won a term as mayor, defeating seven candidates, including Riley, in a landslide primary election, receiving 85,045 votes to Riley's 22,510.

She said, "The forces of evil are pretty deep-seated in this city" and promised to "clean up sin, gambling, and prostitution". She was sworn in on January 1, 1949. She was the second woman to serve as mayor of a major U.S. city. Bertha Knight Landes had served as mayor of Seattle from 1926 to 1928.

She started her term of office by shaking up the administration of the police department. She forced the removal of slot machines from American Legion, Eagles, and Shrine facilities and even the prestigious Multnomah Athletic Club. She reorganized the police department, ferreting out corruption and enforced city ordinances against vice. Her administration instituted one-way traffic patterns in the downtown and revitalized the Housing Authority of Portland. She promoted an ordinance that passed unanimously prohibiting anyone from being excluded in a public place in Portland. She survived a recall effort in October 1949 and derision in the press (she was called "No Sin Lee" after closing the Chinese gambling establishments), but her anti-gambling stance likely cost her a second mayoral term.

== Later career ==
Lee was appointed to the U.S. Board of Parole by President Dwight D. Eisenhower on August 7, 1953. She was appointed to the Subversive Activities Control Board on September 4, 1956, and appointed chairman on January 2, 1957 (her new position becoming effective January 21). While serving in this role, she called for more women to seek employment in public affairs. She resigned this position in August 1962 to resume her law practice and to serve as a lecturer at Portland State University.

== Awards ==
Western Airlines honored her first anniversary as mayor by naming a new Convair CV-240 airliner, The Dorothy McCullough Lee. The Woman's National Press Club selected her as one of the nation’s six most distinguished women in April 1949. She was awarded an honorary doctor of laws degree from Mills College in Oakland in June 1949.

== Personal life ==
Lee had two children, adopted as infants, David Scott Lee (born July 4, 1936, and received by the Lees five days later) and Priscilla Dorothy Lee (born October 30, 1937). Her husband, William Scott Lee, an oil company sales representative, died on February 6, 1976.

== Death ==
Early in 1981, Dorothy McCullough Lee suffered a heart attack. On February 19, 1981, she died at Park View Nursing Home. She is buried in Portland's River View Cemetery in the McCullough family plot beside her parents and her husband.

== Archival papers and unpublished biography ==
The papers of Dorothy McCullough Lee are housed at Radcliffe College, in the Arthur and Elizabeth Schlesinger Library on the History of Women in America. The Oregon Historical Society includes an untitled biography of Dorothy McCullough Lee written by her husband William Scott Lee.

== Footnotes ==
Preceded by Earl Riley	Mayor of Portland, Oregon; 1949–1953	Succeeded by Fred L. Peterson
