= Community orchard =

Fruit trees managed by a local community

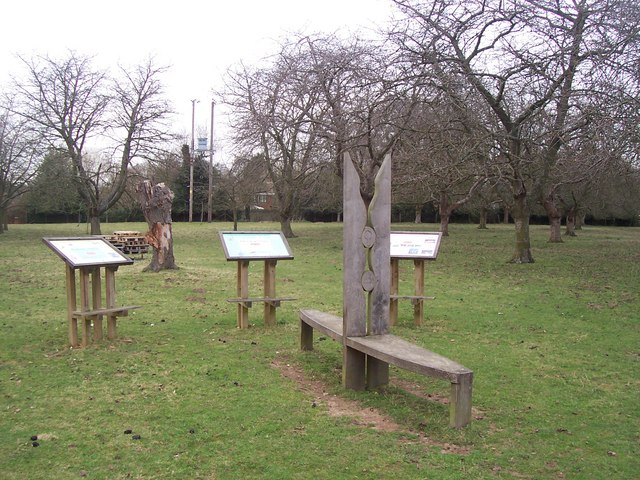
Lynsted Community Cherry Orchard

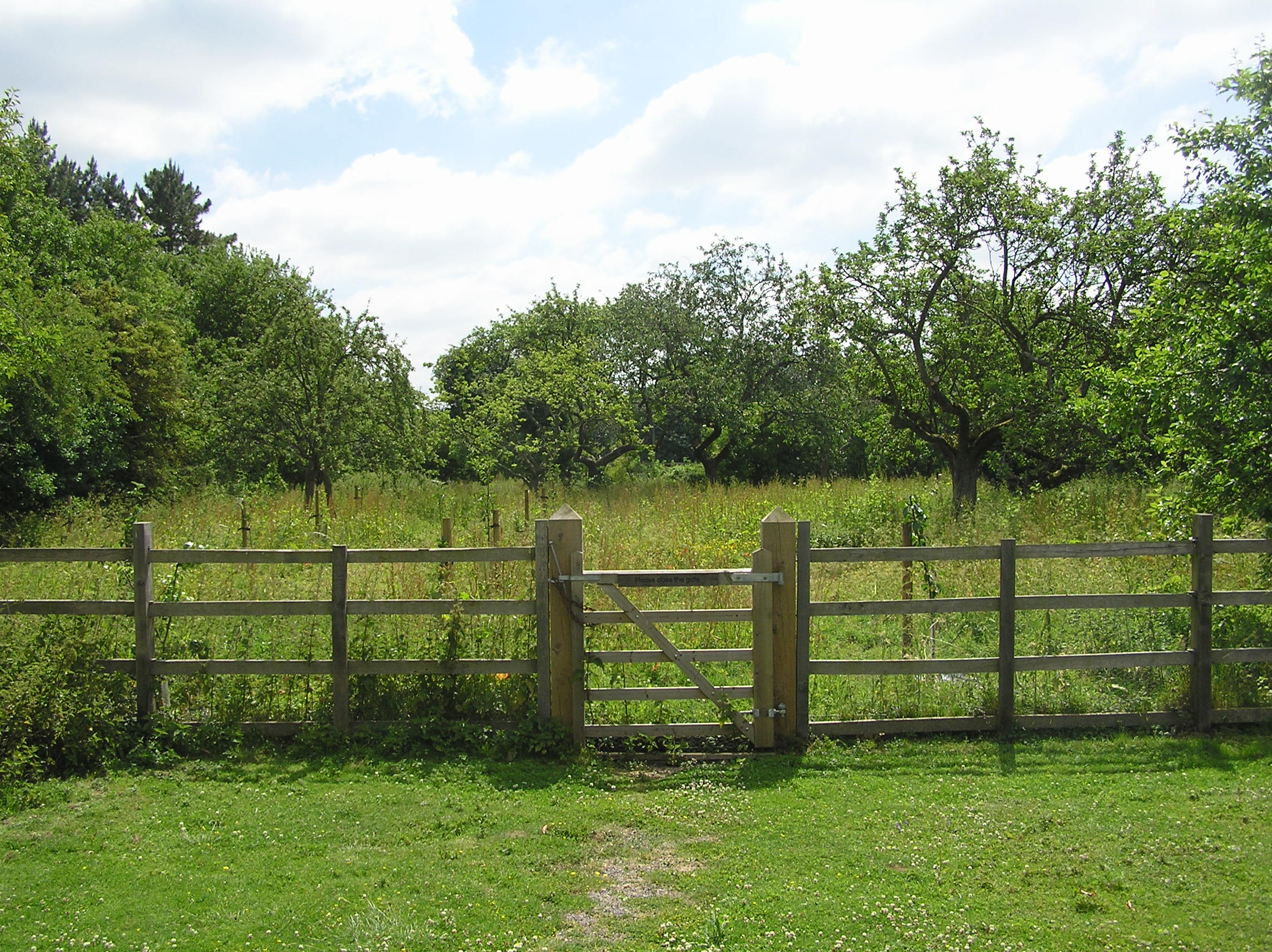
Community Orchard in Northamptonshire

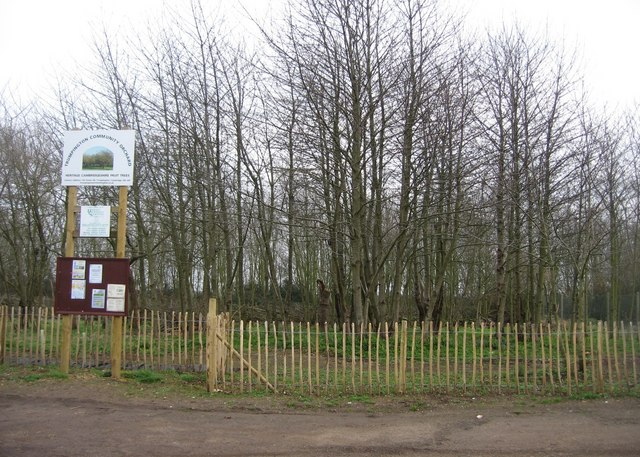
Trumpington Community Orchard

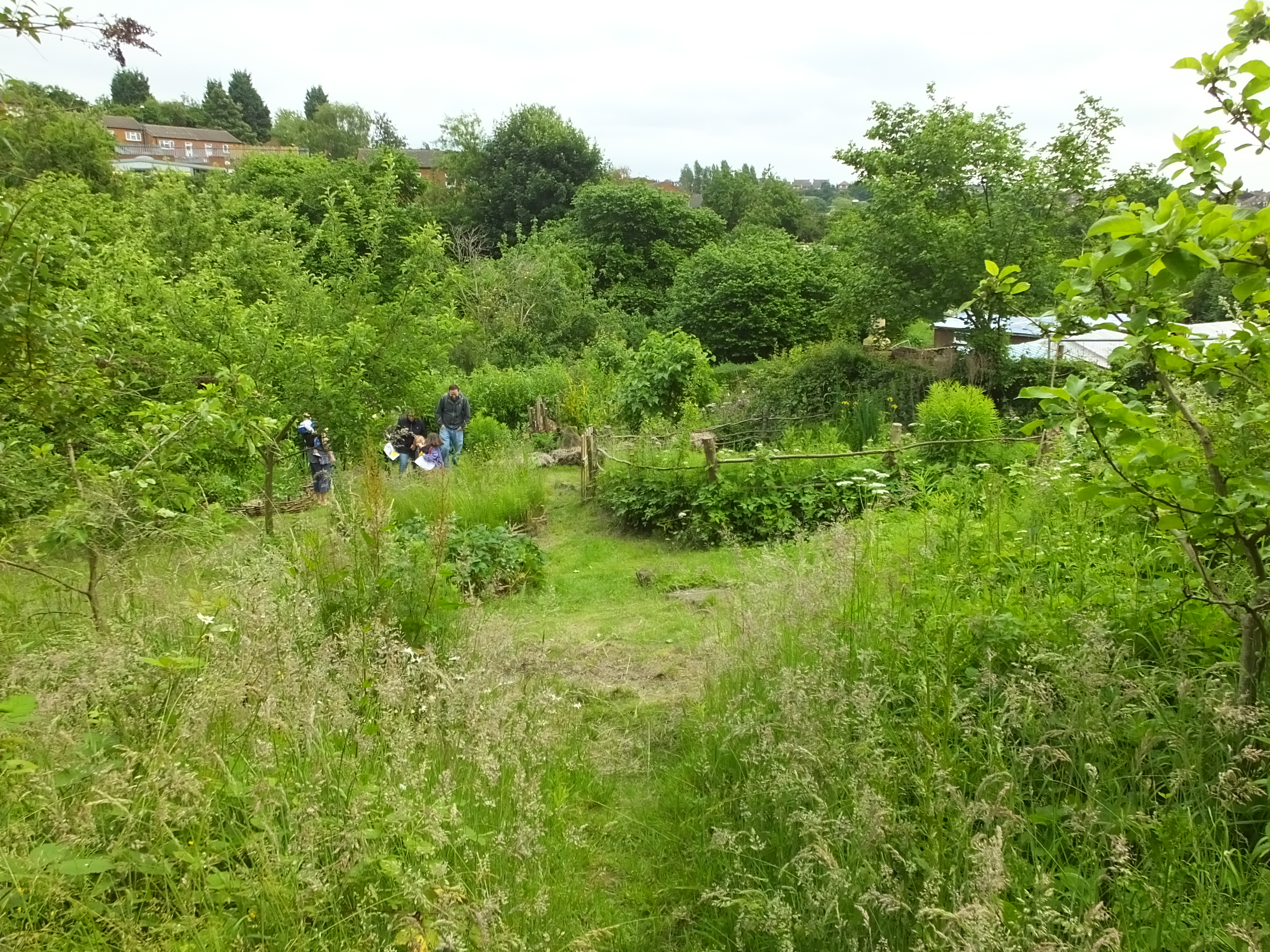
Community Orchard in Nottinghamshire

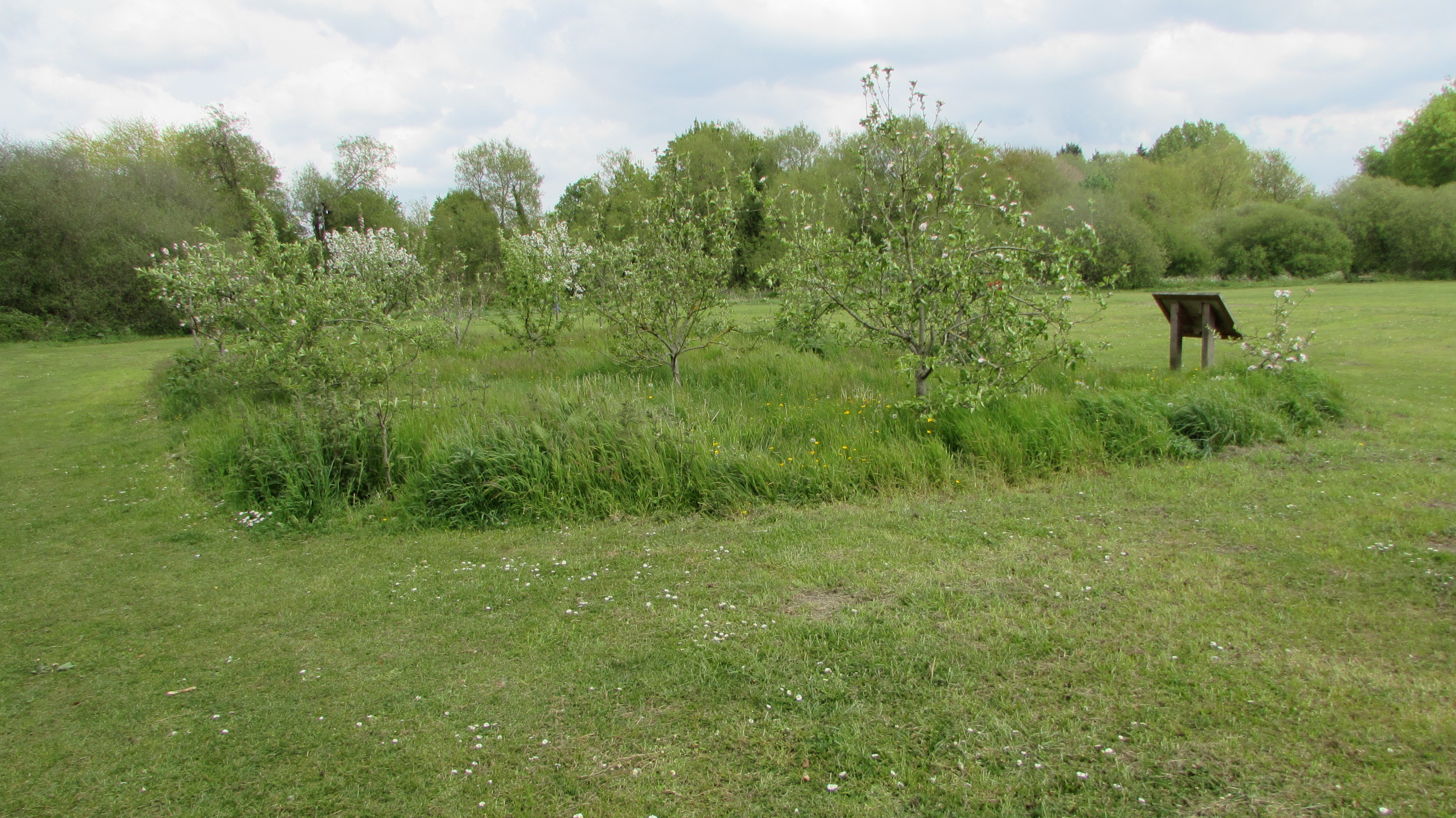
Community Orchard in Salisbury

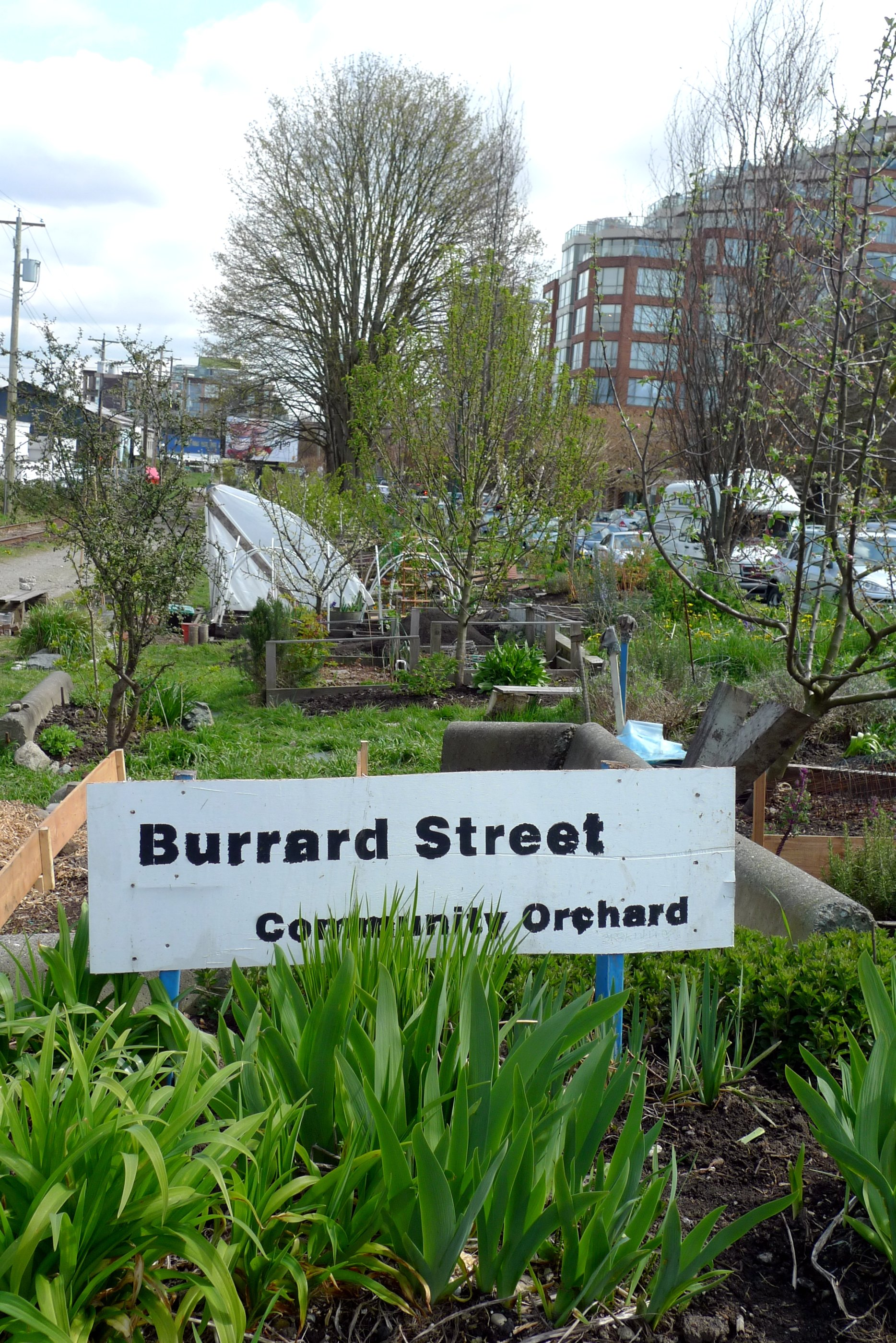
Community Orchard in Vancouver

A community orchard is a collection of fruit trees shared by communities and growing in publicly accessible areas such as public greenspaces, parks, schools, churchyards, allotments or, in the US, abandoned lots. Such orchards are a shared resource and not managed for personal or business profit. Income may be generated to sustain the orchard as a charity, community interest company, or other non-profit structure. What they have in common is that they are cared for by a community of people.

Community orchards are planted for many reasons. They increase the public's access to healthy, organic fruit - especially in areas where the population cannot afford healthy, fresh food. They teach young people where their food comes from. They allow ordinary people to develop organic fruit tree growing skills. And they can make an ordinary park or green space into a community centre, where residents volunteer together to care for and harvest the trees. Community orchards also are a place of celebration. Many groups organize harvest and blossom festivals, cider pressing events, canning workshops and more.

== Types of community orchards ==
=== Membership orchards ===
Community orchards are structured in various ways. Some models, such as Copley Orchard in Vancouver, have a membership model. Members are asked to donate $20 a year to cover orchard costs. Membership comes with rights and responsibilities. Members have the right to enjoy the harvest - and the responsibility to care for the trees during stewardship days.

=== Allotment garden orchards ===
Other orchards are linked to allotment gardens. Strathcona Community Orchard in Vancouver, B.C., is an example of that. Members pay for the right to grow vegetables or flowers in one of the 200 plots on the site - membership is just $10.00 a year and the plot rental fee is an additional $5 a year. As part of their membership, however, they must attend a certain number of mandatory work party days which take place on the last Sunday of every month except December. During the work parties, members spend time caring for the garden’s communal assets. Those assets include the fruit trees, the compost pile, and pathways.

=== Old versus new orchards ===
Community orchards are often made up of newly planted trees, but in some cases local residents have joined forces to rescue an old, neglected orchard that might otherwise be cut down. One example of that is Piper Orchard in Seattle, WA. That orchard was planted by A.W. Piper, a Bavarian pioneer in the late 1800s. His family later sold the land to the city to become part of a large park. The fruit trees were forgotten until 1983, when a group of volunteers decided to clear the overgrowth around the trees, many of which were still alive and still producing.

=== Permaculture orchards ===
Some groups are integrating permaculture concepts into their orchards by creating food forests that interplant various types of perennial food crops. The goal is to create an ecosystem that works in harmony with nature. In food forests, trees, shrubs, and herbs work together to prevent pest and disease problems and to increase soil fertility. One well publicized example is the Beacon Food Forest in Seattle.

== Orchards and city planning ==
Municipalities are also responding to increasing demand for communal fruit trees by planting apple, pear, and other fruit trees in public spaces. The City of Calgary, for instance, launched their Community Orchard Pilot project in 2009. Some of the orchards are city run and others are community-run. Their goal was to encourage local food production, foster community involvement, educate Calgarians about fruit tree care techniques, to demonstrate and test a range of fruit trees and shrubs and to evaluate the success of community orchard models, share results and recommend changes if required.

== Advantages of community orchards ==
Researchers are now studying the community orchard movement to see how it affects food security in cities and how it affects the environment. Kyle Clark and Kimberly A. Nicholas believe that urban food forestry, while in its infancy is not a passing trend. They believe community orchards and food forests will contribute to sustainable living in cities and help cities faced challenges like food security, climate change and poverty.

== Challenges faced by community orchardists ==
=== Pest and disease problems ===
One of the problems faced by the community orchard movement is that many groups are planting fruit trees without knowing the complexities of how to care for them organically. Poor decisions early on and a lack of fruit tree care skills can lead to long-lasting problems.

In an article "Community Orchards" by the National Sustainable Agriculture Information Service, author and NCAT Horticulture Specialist Guy K. Ames writes.

"The relative permanence of an orchard demands far-sightedness. An ill-chosen variety can cost years of time and care before it is discarded as impractical or chronic diseases exact their toll. Failure to properly amend a soil before planting is not easily rectified after a tree is established. And a pruning, fertilization, and training regimen needs to be well-considered at the start and somewhat consistent through the years, or the orchardists are risking aggravating diseases, inducing biennial bearing, delaying the age of fruiting, or otherwise creating long-lasting problems for themselves and the plants.

=== Community resistance ===
Other problems include resistance in communities that do not welcome fruit trees in their local park. In Toronto, Canada, a proposal to plant a community orchard in a local park raised an uproar as some residents feared that the fruit trees would displace children playing ball.

== Community orchards around the world ==
The community orchard movement is relatively new in North America, but it has existed since the 1990s in the United Kingdom.

Today there are hundreds of community orchards in the UK. In the capital, London, more orchards are fruit trees are being planted in public spaces - and some old orchards are being restored - by a group called the London Orchard Project.

There are also initiatives in other countries. Pick Your (City) Fruit is a project in Lisbon, Portugal supported by the European Cultural Foundation. Their goal is to create public orchards that will be cared for by the community and will also be a place where all members of society can share "experiences, techniques, recipes and food".

In October 2020, Varazdin, Croatia built the first phase of community orchard with 250 trees accessible to the public.

=== The larger community orchard movement in North America: The Community Orchard Network ===
In 2015, a group of community orchardists from across North America joined forces. The leaders of the Baltimore Orchard Project, Philadelphia Orchard Project, Portland Fruit Tree Project, and Orchard People in Toronto felt that many community orchardists were making the same mistakes and "reinventing the wheel". Their goal was to create a network of community orchardists who could share resources and information for the purpose of "advancing the conduct, knowledge and impact of urban agroforestry.

The group, with the assistance and support of ACTrees and the Arbour Day Foundation, holds monthly free webinars covering topics of interest to community orchardists and has guest speakers including well known authors Michael Phillips, author of "The Holistic Orchard", Eric Toensmeier, author of Perennial Vegetables and co-author of "Edible Forest Gardens", and Lee Reich, author of Landscaping with Fruit. Within the first 6 months of its founding in January 2015, The Community Orchard Network had a membership of 185 people from North America and beyond in its google group.

== See also ==
- Community gardening
