= Paul L. Patterson =

26th Governor of Oregon

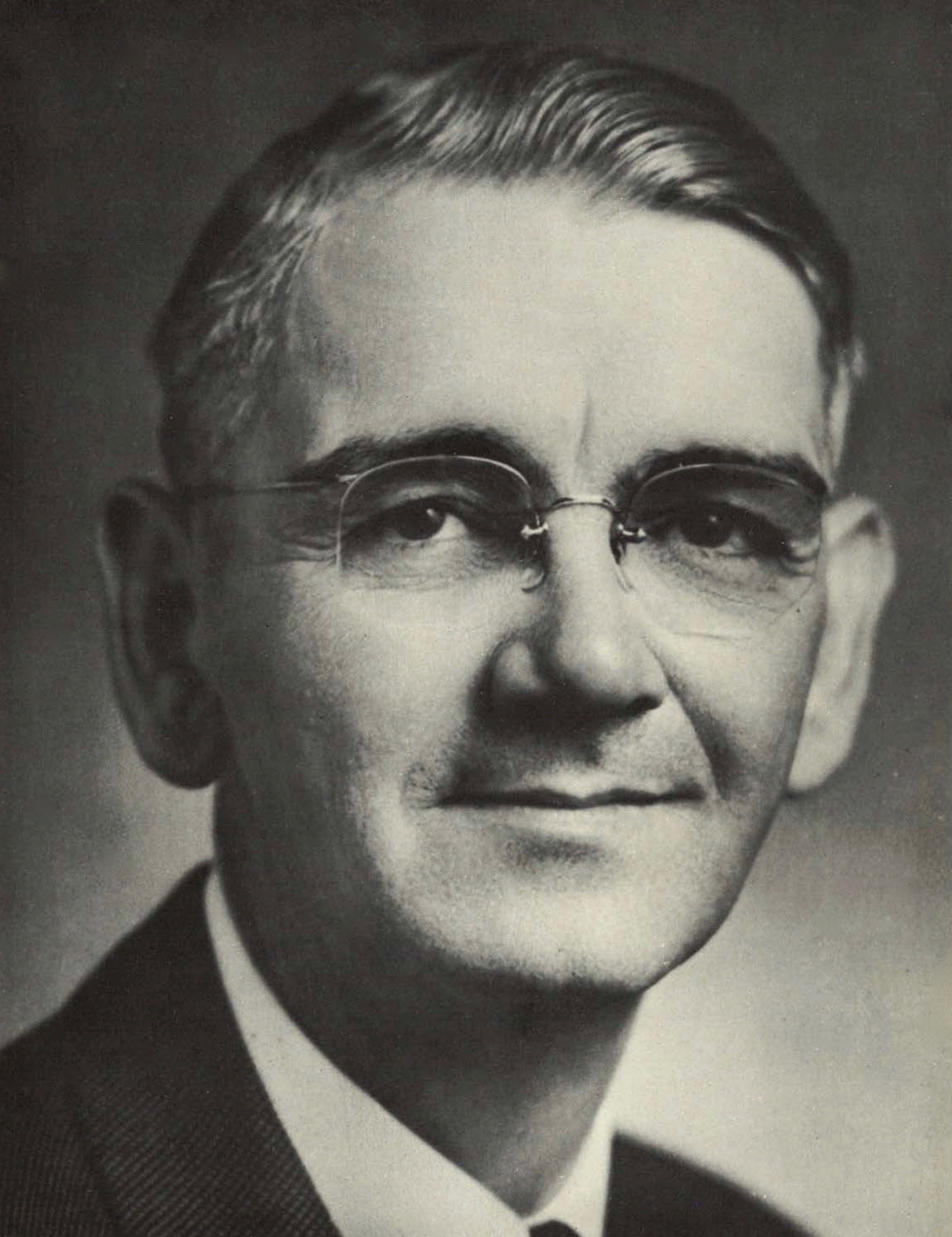

26th Governor of Oregon
- In office December 27, 1952 – January 31, 1956
- Preceded by: Douglas McKay
- Succeeded by: Elmo Smith

President of the Oregon State Senate
- In office 1951–1952
- Preceded by: William E. Walsh
- Succeeded by: Eugene E. Marsh
- Constituency: Washington County

Personal details
- Born: July 18, 1900 Kent, Ohio, U.S.
- Died: January 31, 1956 (aged 55) Portland, Oregon, U.S.
- Party: Republican
- Spouse: Georgia Patterson
- Education: University of Oregon
- Profession: Lawyer

Military service
- Allegiance: United States
- Branch/service: United States Army
- Unit: Artillery Division

Paul Linton Patterson (July 18, 1900 – January 31, 1956) was an American Republican politician. A native of Ohio, he served in World War I before becoming an attorney in Oregon. Later he served as the president of the Oregon State Senate (1951–1952) and the 26th governor of Oregon (1952–1956). He was the first Governor of Oregon who was born in the 20th century, as well as the most recent one to die in office.

== Early life ==
Patterson was born on July 18, 1900, in Kent, Ohio. His father was George A. Patterson, at the time attending college in Ohio, and Paul's mother was Ada Linton Patterson. After completing college, George became a Congregationalist minister, and moved the family to Portland, Oregon, in 1908.

In his first job, young Paul worked as a newsboy on the streets of Portland, later working up to his own paper route. He completed his public education, a graduate of Portland's Washington High School (now closed). Patterson served briefly in the U.S. Army during the First World War in the artillery.

After the war, Patterson enrolled in the University of Oregon, first earning his B.A. in business administration (1923), then a Juris Doctor (1926). While in college, he met Georgia Searle Benson, the daughter of a prominent Portland family. They married on May 16, 1927, and later had three children. After graduating, Patterson passed the State Bar and set up a law firm in Hillsboro, Oregon, in 1926. He remained involved in this private practice until 1952.

== Political career ==
The law firm launched Patterson's political career, starting with a position as the Deputy District Attorney of Washington County from 1926 until 1933. After serving in this capacity, he went on to serve (at various times) as the city attorney for Hillsboro, Beaverton, Gaston, Sherwood, and Tualatin. Such service gained him prominence throughout Washington County's political establishment.

He chaired the Washington County Republican Party up to 1944. This is when he noticed an open local seat in the Oregon State Senate which had no candidates for office. He agreed to run for it himself, winning in the November 1944 election. He held his Senate seat from 1945 until 1952, the last year as President of the Senate.

=== Governorship ===
Governor Douglas McKay resigned in 1952 to accept President Eisenhower's appointment as U.S. Secretary of the Interior. At this time, Patterson, as president of the Senate, was next in line for the governorship. He was sworn in as Oregon's 26th governor on December 27, 1952.

Governor Patterson assumed office with a low political profile statewide, but proved to be popular. He easily won the Republican gubernatorial nomination and election in his own right in 1954.

As with his other Republican contemporaries, he was fiscally conservative, but accepted federal money for unemployment aid, transportation projects, and water management programs. He strongly supported the state's transportation infrastructure, and encouraged the development of the state freeway system. No increases in funding or expansion of social programs were proposed under his leadership.

Governor Patterson was opposed to a state sales tax without a popular vote. Any move to legislatively implement a sales tax has been met with major opposition since his administration.

Inside his own party, he was looked upon favorably by both the national and local interests. Patterson had the backing of Portland's influential Arlington Club, some of whose most powerful members assisted his election campaigns.

=== Bid for the Senate and unexpected death ===
Republicans hoped to pick up Senator Wayne Morse's seat in the 1956 election, and considered the popular governor as the party's best chance. Patterson announced his candidacy January 28, 1956, at a time when his popularity was highest.

Three days later, after his first campaign speech, Patterson collapsed during a meeting with campaign advisers at the Arlington Club in Portland on January 31, 1956. He was reported as suddenly slumping over in his chair. When examined, it was determined that he had suffered a coronary occlusion. The deceased governor was provided a state funeral on February 3, 1956. Patterson's ashes were interred at River View Cemetery in Portland. President of the Senate Elmo Smith was sworn in to succeed Patterson as governor.

== Legacy ==
Governor Patterson Memorial State Recreation Site in coastal Oregon is named after him.

== Sources ==
Political offices
Preceded by Douglas McKay	Governor of Oregon; 1952–1956	Succeeded by Elmo Smith
Party political offices
Preceded by Douglas McKay	Republican nominee for Governor of Oregon; 1954	Succeeded by Elmo Smith
