= George Luis Baker =

American businessman and politician

George Baker
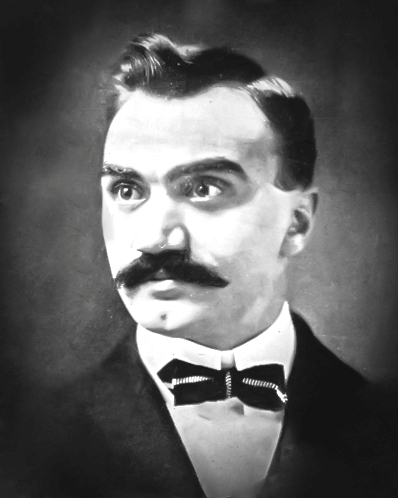

39th Mayor of Portland, Oregon
- In office June 2, 1917 – June 2, 1933
- Preceded by: H. Russell Albee
- Succeeded by: Joseph K. Carson, Jr.

Personal details
- Born: August 23, 1868 The Dalles, Oregon, U.S.
- Died: May 16, 1941 (aged 72) Portland, Oregon, U.S.
- Party: Democratic
- Profession: Businessman, politician

George Luis Baker (1868–1941) was an American businessman and politician who served as mayor of Portland, Oregon, from 1917 to 1933.

Baker was born in The Dalles, Oregon and attended school in California. Working in the theatrical business, Baker started the Baker Stock Company at the Baker Theater at Third and Yamhill Streets in Portland. He spent nine years as a member of the city council and two years as Commissioner of Public Affairs before being elected mayor.

Baker openly drank alcohol during Oregon's Prohibition, a time when he was both the mayor and the enforcer of the laws. He and the Portland Police Bureau took control of liquor distribution (through bootlegging) and kept speakeasies open. Baker's campaign finance violations and charges of immorality at the raucous 1918 Oregon Auto Dealers' Convention were both brought in front of a grand jury, who declined to indict him. Additionally, the KKK's leader (exalted cyclops) in Portland claimed to have blackmail material on Baker, which could have been any number of things.

Baker's $7100 home mortgage was paid off by wealthy benefactors including Franklin Griffith of Portland Railway, Light and Power Company, reportedly because Baker claimed he couldn't make enough money as mayor.

In 1919-1920 he served as a member of the Federal Electric Railways Commission. In 1922, he spoke at the General Convention of the Episcopal Church, which was held in Portland that year.

By the 1930s, Baker and political allies were embroiled in accepting bribes for locating the Portland Public Market. Johannsen and Gross began a recall effort against city commissioner John Mann, Baker, Riley, and Langley. Signatures for the recall petition were mysteriously stolen during a break-in. Baker was acquitted on the market corruption charges days before the recall vote, which narrowly failed to remove him from office. Two weeks after the vote, Johannsen's house was bombed.

The October 18, 2012 edition of the Portland Mercury listed Baker as the Second Worst Mayor in Portland history because he had "proudly posed for a photo shoot with hooded members of the Ku Klux Klan and felt his greatest accomplishment of mayor was 'removal of subversives'," particularly members of the Industrial Workers of the World union.

Baker died on May 16, 1941.

Preceded by H. Russell Albee	Mayor of Portland, Oregon; 1917–1933	Succeeded by Joseph K. Carson, Jr.
