= Portland Fruit Tree Project =

Nonprofit organization based in Portland, Oregon, U.S.

- The organization's logo
- Established: 2006
- Type: Nonprofit
- Location: Portland, Oregon, U.S.
- Executive director: Heather Fornes

The Portland Fruit Tree Project (PFTP) is a nonprofit organization that seeks to harvest unwanted fruit from tree owners. The project was established in 2006 and compiles a registry with maps. Since then, the group has harvested approximately half a million pounds of fruit. Fruit is donated to local food banks.

In 2012, there were more than 4,000 registered trees yielding approximately 66,000 pounds of fruit. In 2023, the group attempted to break the record for the world's largest charcuterie board, as part of a fundraiser. PFTP has helped organize 'If You Can't Beat 'Em, Eat 'Em', an effort to paddleboard across the Willamette River to collect blackberries at Ross Island.

One of the picking groups collects fruit via bicycles. PFTP also harvests nuts and hosts workshops. The group has operated an advice text line called 'PDXFruitTreeTips'. PFTP has helped operates a community fruit fridge in Tigard, Oregon.

Heather Fornes was PFTP's executive director in 2024.

== See also ==
- Community orchard
