= Home Forward =

Housing authority in Multnomah County, Oregon, U.S.

Agency overview
- Formed: December 11, 1941
- Jurisdiction: Multnomah County, Oregon, United States
- Headquarters: 135 SW Ash Street Portland, Oregon, U.S.; 45.5221°N 122.6720°W
- Website: www.homeforward.org

Home Forward, established in 1941 as the Housing Authority of Portland, is a housing authority that serves Portland, Oregon, and nearby municipalities in Multnomah County, Oregon, United States. Home Forward maintains properties in Portland, Gresham, and Fairview as of 2026.

== Governance ==
Home Forward is led by a nine-member board of commissioners. All board members are volunteers who serve staggered four-year terms. Four commissioners are recommended by the City of Portland, two are recommended by the City of Gresham, two are recommended by Multnomah County, and one is recommended by the residents of Home Forward developments. The recommended board members are appointed by the Mayor of Portland and confirmed by the Portland City Council.

== History ==
The Housing Authority of Portland (HAP) was created by the Portland City Council on December 11, 1941. The city council created the agency in response to a massive influx of people who came to work at shipyards in the Portland area during World War II. HAP developed several housing projects over the course of the war, including Guild's Lake Courts and Columbia Villa. Vanport, the largest wartime housing development, was constructed independently by the Kaiser Company, although management of the development was later taken over by HAP. By 1942, HAP developments housed approximately 72,000 people, making it the largest housing authority in the United States.

HAP began using the name "Home Forward" in May 2011.

In March 2026, Willamette Week reported that Home Forward officials reported "high vacancy rates, tenants' nonpayment of rent and cash flow woes" to their board, and that tenants complained of "drug dealing inside building walls and unfettered access". Also in March, the Oregon Bureau of Labor and Industries (BOLI) investigated Home Forward after it received a discrimination complaint alleging that agency refused to provide reasonable accommodation by refusing to provide an in-person meeting with a client. BOLI found "substantial evidence of an unlawful housing practice on the basis of disability" by Home Forward.

Home Forward's CEO, Ivory Mathews, resigned in April 2026. In April 2026, it was reported that from 2023 to 2025, Mathews spent more than $100,000 of public funds on travel to conferences and networking events. On an October 2024 trip to Hawaii, she brought along several family members; Home Forward paid $7,269 for the trip.

== See also ==
- Louisa Flowers, the namesake of a housing development by Home Forward
