= Fred L. Peterson =

American politician (1896–1985)

43rd Mayor of Portland, Oregon
- In office January 1953 – January 1957
- Preceded by: Dorothy McCullough Lee
- Succeeded by: Terry Schrunk

Personal details
- Born: May 21, 1896 Owatonna, Minnesota, U.S.
- Died: October 16, 1985 (aged 89) Portland, Oregon, U.S.
- Party: Republican
- Profession: Pharmacist, politician

Fred Lawrence Peterson (May 21, 1896 – October 16, 1985) was an American politician and businessman in the state of Oregon. A native of Minnesota, he grew up in Portland, Oregon, where he served as mayor from 1953 through 1956.

== Early life ==
Fred Lawrence Peterson was born on May 21, 1896, in Owatonna, Minnesota, to Frank R. Peterson and Nina A. Peterson. Peterson lived in Portland from 1902, and graduated from Washington High School in 1915. His father Frank operated the Lents pharmacy for a number of years. Fred served as a sergeant in the 162nd Infantry Regiment during World War I and was later promoted to second lieutenant.

== City commissioner (1941–1952) ==
In 1940, Peterson was a prominent Portland east-side businessman when he began his run for political office. At that time, he was pharmacist and proprietor of the Glisan Street Pharmacy. It was Peterson's contention, as stated at the Willamette Democratic Society luncheon on April 18, 1940, that "…city hall is a place for business men and a business administration" (Oregonian, April 19, 1940 p. 7). His unsuccessful first campaign for city commissioner in 1940 called on Portland citizens to clean up the city for children, building more parks and playgrounds. His second campaign for city commissioner, also in 1940, was successful, and he took office on January 1, 1941. As commissioner he presided over the Bureau of Health. He continued to serve as a city commissioner until elected as mayor.

Peterson served three terms as city commissioner. During his later service as commissioner, he battled with Mayor Dorothy McCullough Lee, Portland's first female mayor. Ironically, he had encouraged her to run for office. Lee was a reform-minded Republican who devoted attention to removing slot machines from American Legion, Eagles, and Shriner's facilities and even the prestigious Multnomah Athletic Club, all of which Peterson as commissioner and member of the business community opposed. Her attempt to have gambling punchboards removed from shops was also opposed by Peterson. She responded by removing Peterson as commissioner of finance and made him commissioner of public utilities, pointedly adding garbage collection and street sweeping to his new duties. The two fought for the mayoralty in a close election that Peterson won in November 1952.

== Mayor (1953–1956) ==
Peterson served as mayor from January 1, 1953, to December 31, 1956. In 1955, when the new chief engineer of the Water Bureau L. Kenneth Anderson told him a new dam was needed in the Bull Run watershed immediately, Peterson told him to get it done now. Anderson replied that a great deal of planning and design would be required, to which Peterson said, "Put the dam in this summer and then you can plan and design it next winter during the slow period".

Among the events of his administration was a visit by the Oregon Zoo's newly acquired elephant Rosy to City Hall on September 26, 1953. On June 11, 1955, Peterson rode in a car in the Portland Rose Festival Parade with ex-president Harry S. Truman.

== Personal information ==
Peterson was a member of the Fraternal Order of Eagles, American Legion, the Forty and Eight veterans organization, the Portland chapter of Rotary International, and the Portland Breakfast Club.

Peterson was married to Madeline E. (born July 28, 1898, and died June 8, 1964) until her death, and later to Margaruite "Peg". Peterson died of cancer at age 89 on October 16, 1985. He is buried at Willamette National Cemetery in Portland, Oregon.

Preceded by Dorothy McCullough Lee	Mayor of Portland, Oregon; 1952–1956	Succeeded by Terry Schrunk
