= Last Man Club =

The Last Man Club was a mutual support group for farmers that chose to stay in the Southern Plains of Texas, US in spite of the devastation caused by the Dust Bowl disaster of the 1930s.

During the Dust Bowl, many farmers around Oklahoma and the Texas Panhandle Area experienced the worst of the Depression. By the time the summer of 1936 hit, they had already been experiencing dust storms, winds that carried away all the topsoil and made it impossible to grow crops, plagues of grasshoppers and starving jackrabbits that devoured anything left over in their fields, and dust pneumonia, caused by the dust that had settled over everything. About a quarter of the population of the panhandle packed up their few belongings and left for California, nicknamed the "Peach Bowl", in search of jobs as fruit harvesters. However, of the ones that did, few found the jobs they searched for, and even they had extremely low wages. These job-searchers were nicknamed "Okies", as so many of them were from Oklahoma.

John McCarty, an editor of the Dalhart Texan, formed the Last Man Club in Dalhart, Texas as a mutual support group for those farmers that chose to stay in the drought-swept Great Plains or, as he called it, "Grab a Root and Growl." Ironically, John McCarty eventually left the Last Man Club for a job opportunity in Amarillo, Texas, never to return. Born in 1900, John McCarty died in 1974.

== Beginnings ==
Declaring that the plains were "the best damned country God's sun ever shown upon," McCarty published a pledge in the newspaper he worked for, stating that he would stay until everyone else was gone, and he dared others to join him.

He got the idea for starting the Last Man Club when he read about a similar club that was started by a Civil War unit. Members had to swear to be the last man to leave the Dust-Bowl-swept area. The exact pledge words were "In the absence of an act of God, serious family injury, or some other emergency, I pledge to stay here as the last man and to do everything I can to help other last men remain in this country. We promise to stay here ’til hell freezes over and skate out on the ice." McCarty worked to instil a sense of pride in the region in the members of his club. He actually celebrated dust storms, saying that the heroism of locals was proved through their determination to remain in the Great Plains.

== In popular culture ==
The 1977 movie Catastrophe has a segment referencing Last Man Clubs.
