= 2020 Portland, Oregon, City Commission election =

The 2020 Portland, Oregon, US City Commission elections were held on May 19, 2020, and November 3, 2020, with a special election on August 11, 2020.

Three positions were up for election. Positions 1 and 2 were open due to the retirement of Amanda Fritz and the death of Nick Fish, respectively. Position 4 was held by Chloe Eudaly, who lost re-election.

Portland has no term limits on officeholders.

== Position 1 ==
Portland City Commission Position 1 election
- May 19, 2020
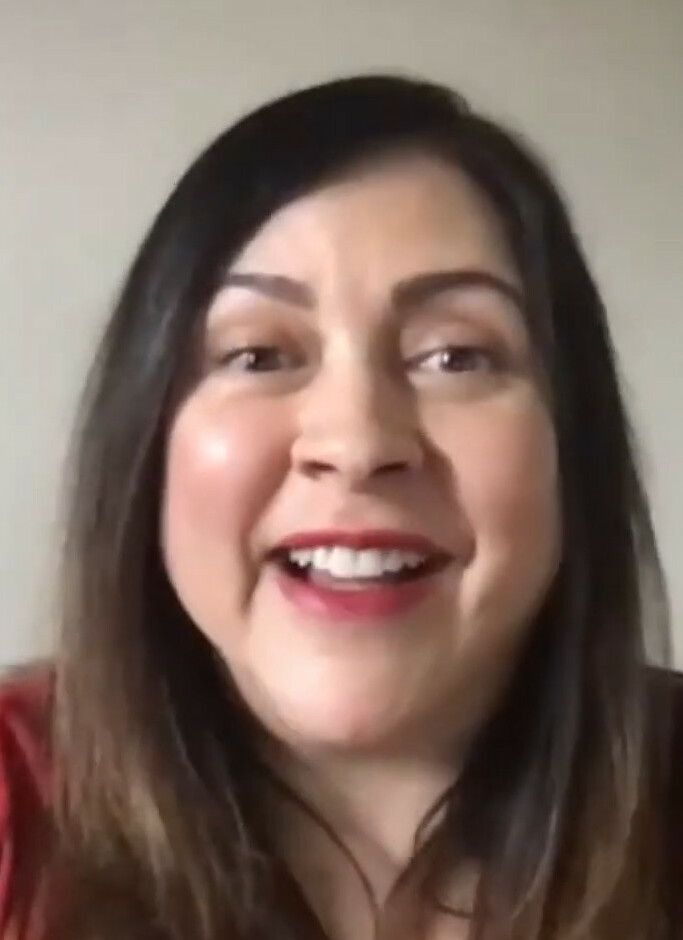

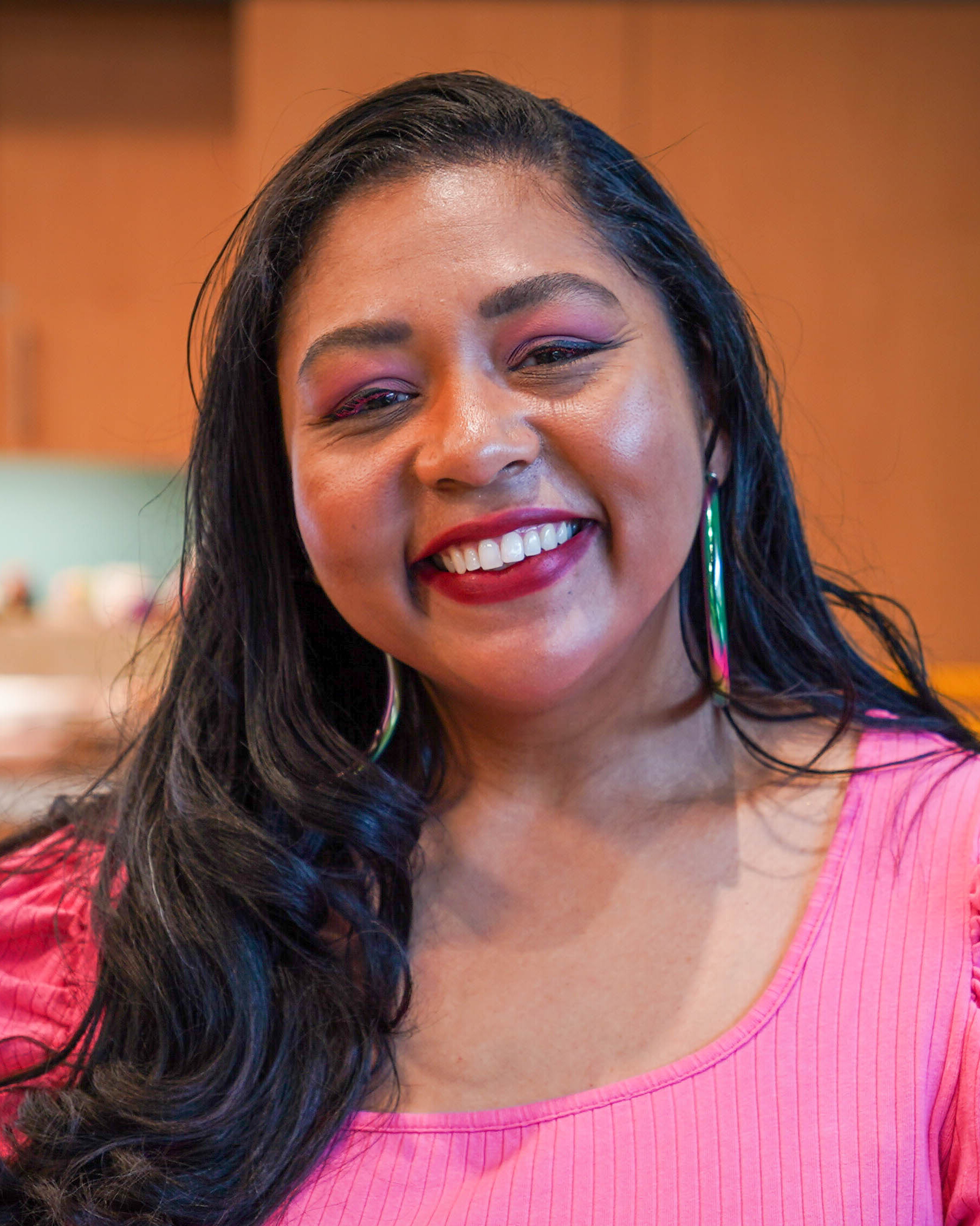
Candidate	Carmen Rubio	Candace Avalos
Party	Nonpartisan	Nonpartisan
Popular vote	139,791	18,727
Percentage	67.5%	9.0%
City Commission before election
Amanda Fritz
Nonpartisan
Elected City Commission
Carmen Rubio
Nonpartisan

Incumbent Amanda Fritz announced that she would retire at the end of her term. Carmen Rubio received more than 50% of the vote in the primary and therefore won outright without needing to advance to the run-off.

Primary debate
No.	Date	Host	Moderator	Link	Nonpartisan	Nonpartisan	Nonpartisan
Key: P Participant A Absent N Not invited I Invited W Withdrawn							
Key: P Participant A Absent N Not invited I Invited W Withdrawn					Candace Avalos	Timothy DuBois	Carmen Rubio
1	Apr. 28, 2020	City Club of Portland	Colin Jones	YouTube	P	P	P

Primary election
Party	Candidate	Votes	%
Nonpartisan	Carmen Rubio	139,791	67.5%
Nonpartisan	Candace Avalos	18,727	9.0%
Nonpartisan	Alicia McCarthy	13,459	6.5%
Nonpartisan	Isham Harris	9,591	4.6%
Nonpartisan	Timothy DuBois	8,619	4.2%
Nonpartisan	Mary Ann Schwab	8,059	3.9%
Nonpartisan	Philip Wolfe	3,409	1.7%
Nonpartisan	Cullis James Autry	2,887	1.4%
Nonpartisan	Corinne Patel	2,132	1.0%
Nonpartisan	Write-ins	532	0.3%
Total votes		207,206	100

== Position 2 ==
Portland City Commission Position 2 election
- May 19, 2020 & November 3, 2020
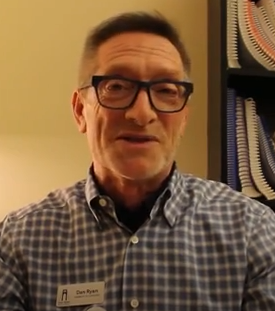

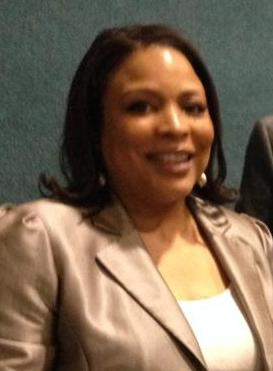
Candidate	Dan Ryan	Loretta Smith
Party	Nonpartisan	Nonpartisan
Popular vote	88,809	83,556
Percentage	51.1%	48.1%
City Commission before election
Nick Fish
Nonpartisan
Elected City Commission
Dan Smith
Nonpartisan

A special election was called due to the death of Nick Fish. The special primary was held in conjunction with the other primaries on May 19, 2020. The run-off election was held on August 11, 2020. Dan Ryan won the run-off election.

Special election primary debates
No.	Date	Host	Moderator	Link	Nonpartisan	Nonpartisan	Nonpartisan	Nonpartisan	Nonpartisan	Nonpartisan	Nonpartisan	Nonpartisan
Key: P Participant A Absent N Not invited I Invited W Withdrawn												
Key: P Participant A Absent N Not invited I Invited W Withdrawn					Margot Black	Cynthia Castro	Ronault Catalani	Sam Chase	Julia DeGraw	Tera Hurst	Dan Ryan	Loretta Smith
1	Apr. 17, 2020	City Club of Portland	Jesse Beason	YouTube	P	P	P	N	N	N	N	P
2	Apr. 24, 2020	City Club of Portland	Jesse Beason	YouTube	N	N	N	P	P	P	P	N

Special primary election
Party	Candidate	Votes	%
Nonpartisan	Loretta Smith	39,395	18.8%
Nonpartisan	Dan Ryan	34,795	16.6%
Nonpartisan	Tera Hurst	31,053	14.8%
Nonpartisan	Julia DeGraw	2,650	12.6%
Nonpartisan	Sam Chase	23,560	11.2
Nonpartisan	Margot Black	14,143	6.8%
Nonpartisan	Cynthia Castro	7,793	3.7%
Nonpartisan	Jack Kerfoot	7,229	3.5%
Nonpartisan	Terry Parker	5,111	2.4%
Nonpartisan	Jeff Lang	3,847	1.8%
Nonpartisan	Ronault Catalani	3,531	1.7%
Nonpartisan	Ryan Farmer	2,416	1.2%
Nonpartisan	Aquiles Montas	2,182	1.0%
Nonpartisan	Jas Davis	1,858	0.9%
Nonpartisan	Alicea Maurseth	1,645	0.8%
Nonpartisan	Diana Gutman	1,606	0.8%
Nonpartisan	Walter Wesley	1,409	0.7%
Nonpartisan	Rachelle Dixon	1,100	0.5%
Write-in		498	0.2%
Total votes		209,678	100.00%

Special election run-off debate
No.	Date	Host	Moderator	Link	Nonpartisan	Nonpartisan
Key: P Participant A Absent N Not invited I Invited W Withdrawn						
Key: P Participant A Absent N Not invited I Invited W Withdrawn					Loretta Smith	Dan Ryan
1	Jul. 31, 2020	City Club of Portland	Jeff Mapes	YouTube	P	P

Special run-off election
Party	Candidate	Votes	%
Nonpartisan	Dan Ryan	88,809	51.1%
Nonpartisan	Loretta Smith	83,556	48.1%
Nonpartisan	Write-ins	1,336	0.8%
Total votes		173,701	100

== Position 4 ==
Portland City Commission Position 4 election
- May 19, 2020 & November 3, 2020
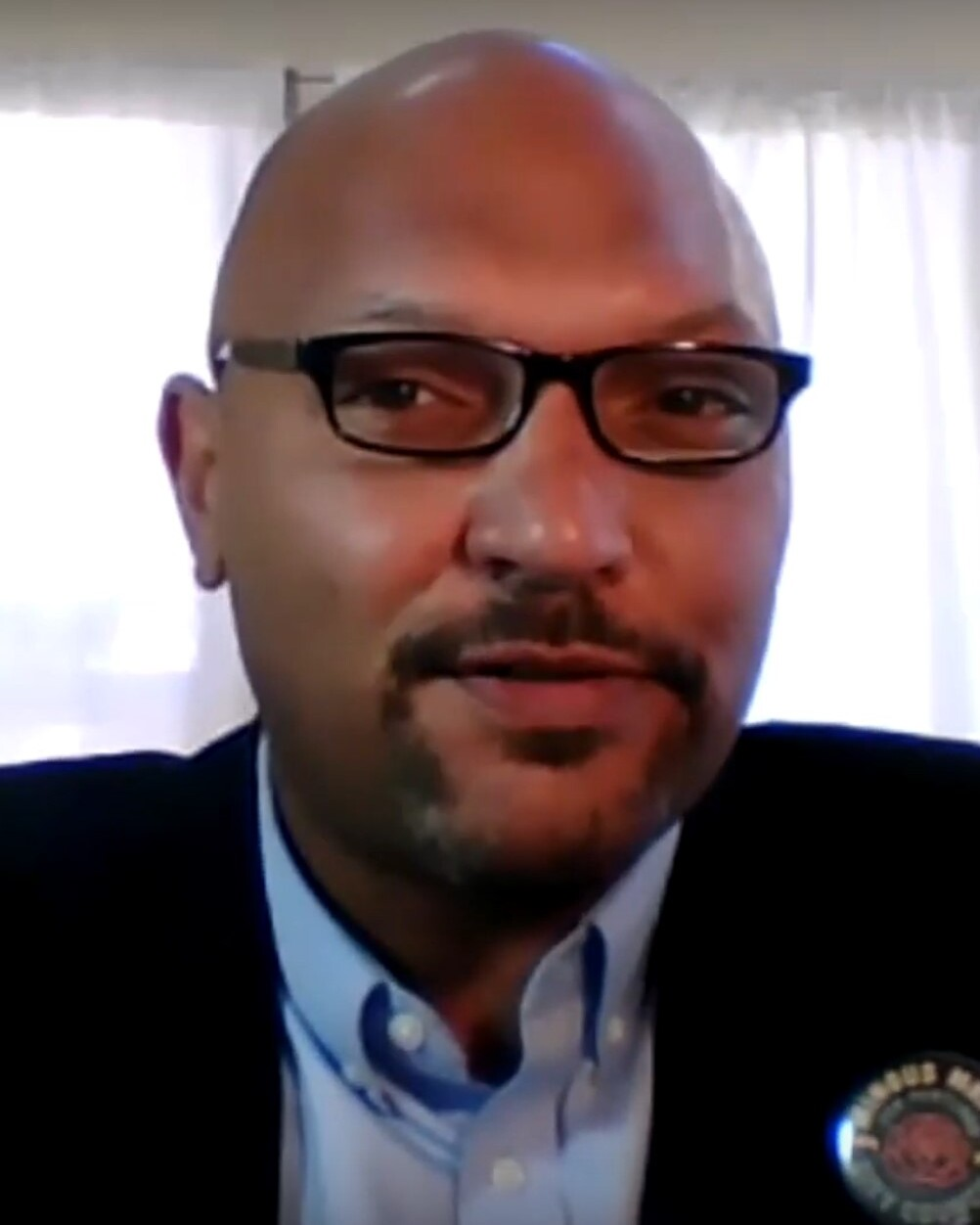

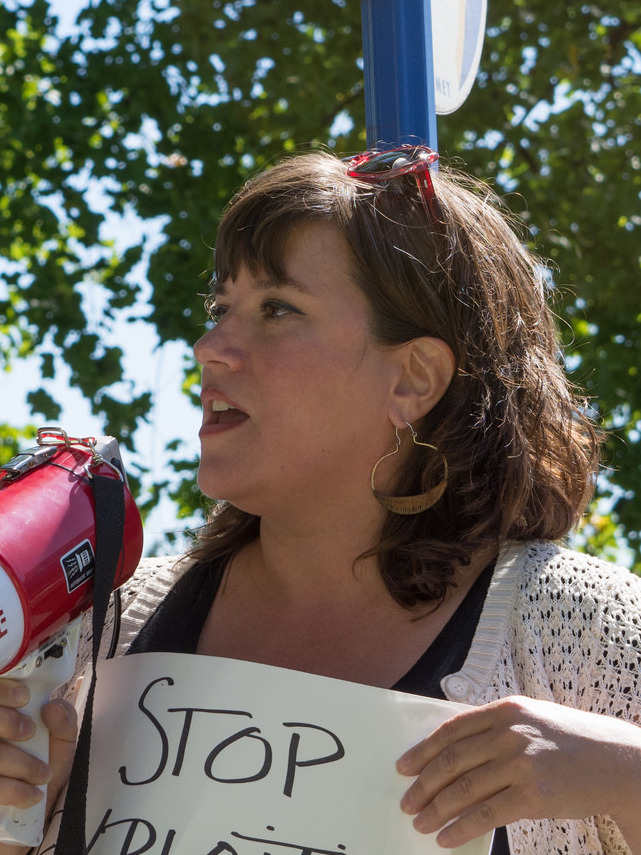
Candidate	Mingus Mapps	Chloe Eudaly
Party	Nonpartisan	Nonpartisan
Popular vote	187,386	146,399
Percentage	55.6%	43.4%
City Commission before election
Chloe Eudaly
Nonpartisan
Elected City Commission
Mingus Mapps
Nonpartisan

Incumbent Chloe Eudaly won the primary election but lost in the run-off to Mingus Mapps.

Primary election debate
No.	Date	Host	Moderator	Link	Nonpartisan	Nonpartisan	Nonpartisan	Nonpartisan
Key: P Participant A Absent N Not invited I Invited W Withdrawn								
Key: P Participant A Absent N Not invited I Invited W Withdrawn					Sam Adams	Chloe Eudaly	Mingus Mapps	Seth Woolley
1	Apr. 8, 2020	City Club of Portland	Serilda Summers-McGee	YouTube	P	P	P	P

Primary election
Party	Candidate	Votes	%
Nonpartisan	Chloe Eudaly (incumbent)	66,943	31.3%
Nonpartisan	Mingus Mapps	61,209	28.6%
Nonpartisan	Sam Adams	59,195	27.7%
Nonpartisan	Keith Wilson	11,190	5.2%
Nonpartisan	Seth Woolley	8,577	4.0%
Nonpartisan	Kevin McKay	3,419	1.6%
Nonpartisan	Robert MacKay	1,549	0.7%
Nonpartisan	Aaron Fancher	1,101	0.5%
Nonpartisan	Write-ins	544	0.3%
Total votes		213,727	100

General election debate
No.	Date	Host	Moderator	Link	Nonpartisan	Nonpartisan
Key: P Participant A Absent N Not invited I Invited W Withdrawn						
Key: P Participant A Absent N Not invited I Invited W Withdrawn					Chloe Eudaly	Mingus Mapps
1	Oct. 9, 2020	City Club of Portland	Dana Haynes	YouTube	P	P

General election
Party	Candidate	Votes	%
Nonpartisan	Mingus Mapps	187,386	55.6%
Nonpartisan	Chloe Eudaly (incumbent)	146,399	43.4%
Nonpartisan	Write-ins	3,276	1.0%
Total votes		337,061	100
