= 2006 Portland, Oregon, City Commission election =

The 2006 Portland City Council elections were held on May 16, 2006, to elect two positions on the Portland, Oregon City Council.

Commissioners Erik Sten and Dan Saltzman both won re-election to positions 2 and 3, respectively. Both candidates received over 50% in the primary elections, thereby avoiding a runoff election.

== Position 2 ==
Portland City Commission Position 2 election, 2006
- May 16, 2006

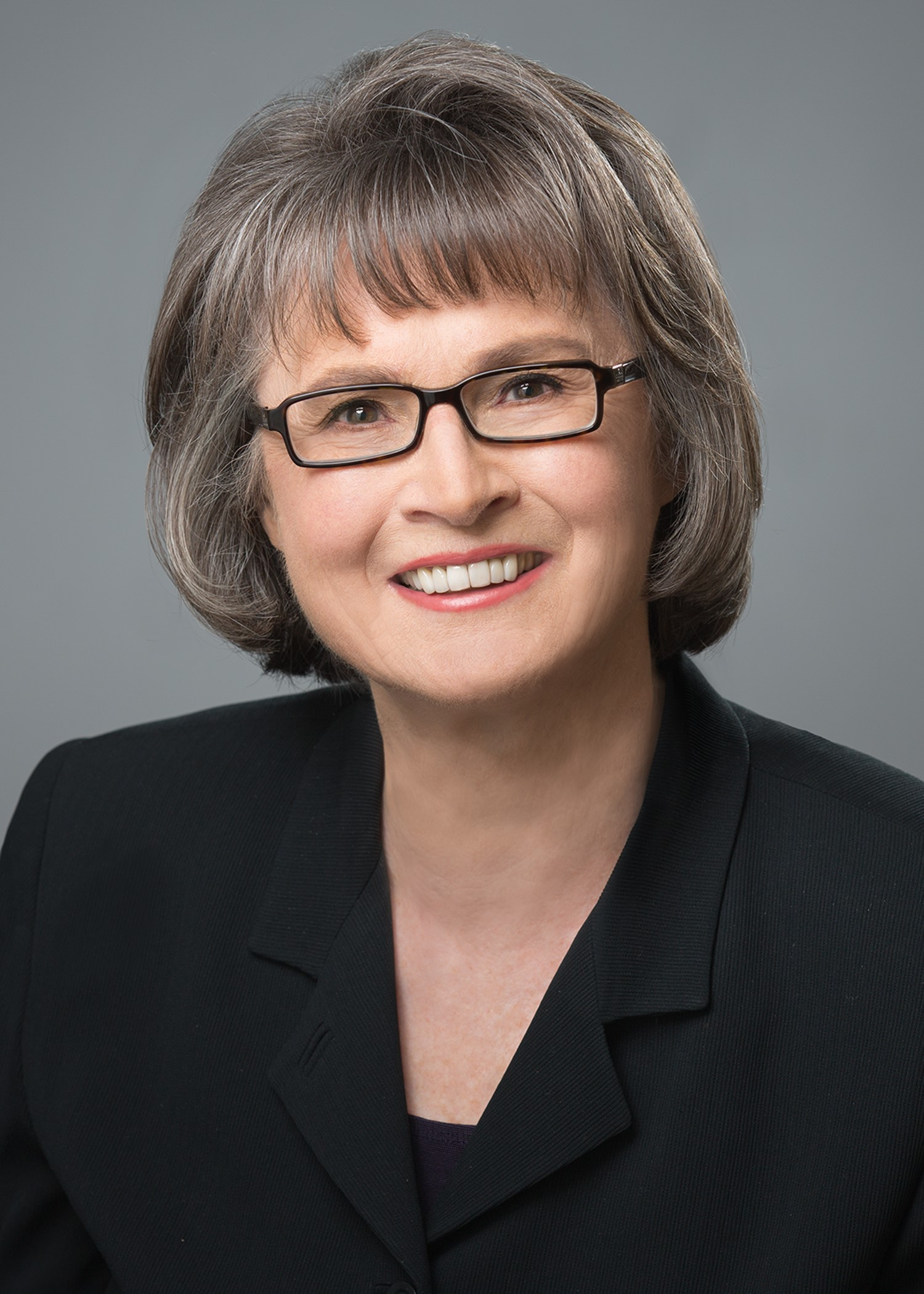
Candidate	Erik Sten	Ginny Burdick
Party	Nonpartisan	Nonpartisan
Popular vote	51,208	27,565
Percentage	50.55%	27.21%
City Commission before election
Erik Sten
Nonpartisan
Elected City Commission
Erik Sten
Nonpartisan

Erik Sten won re-election outright with 50.55% of the vote.

Position 2 election, 2006
Party	Candidate	Votes	%
Nonpartisan	Erik Sten	51,208	50.55%
Nonpartisan	Ginny Burdick	27,565	27.21%
Nonpartisan	Dave Lister	13,557	13.38%
Nonpartisan	Emilie Jean Boyles	5,597	5.53%
Nonpartisan	Lewis E. Humble	1,590	1.57%
Nonpartisan	Cisco Holdman	845	0.83%
Nonpartisan	Jory "Moof" Knott	648	0.64%
Write-in		290	0.29%
Total votes		101,300	100

== Position 3 ==
Portland City Commission Position 2 election, 2006
- May 16, 2006
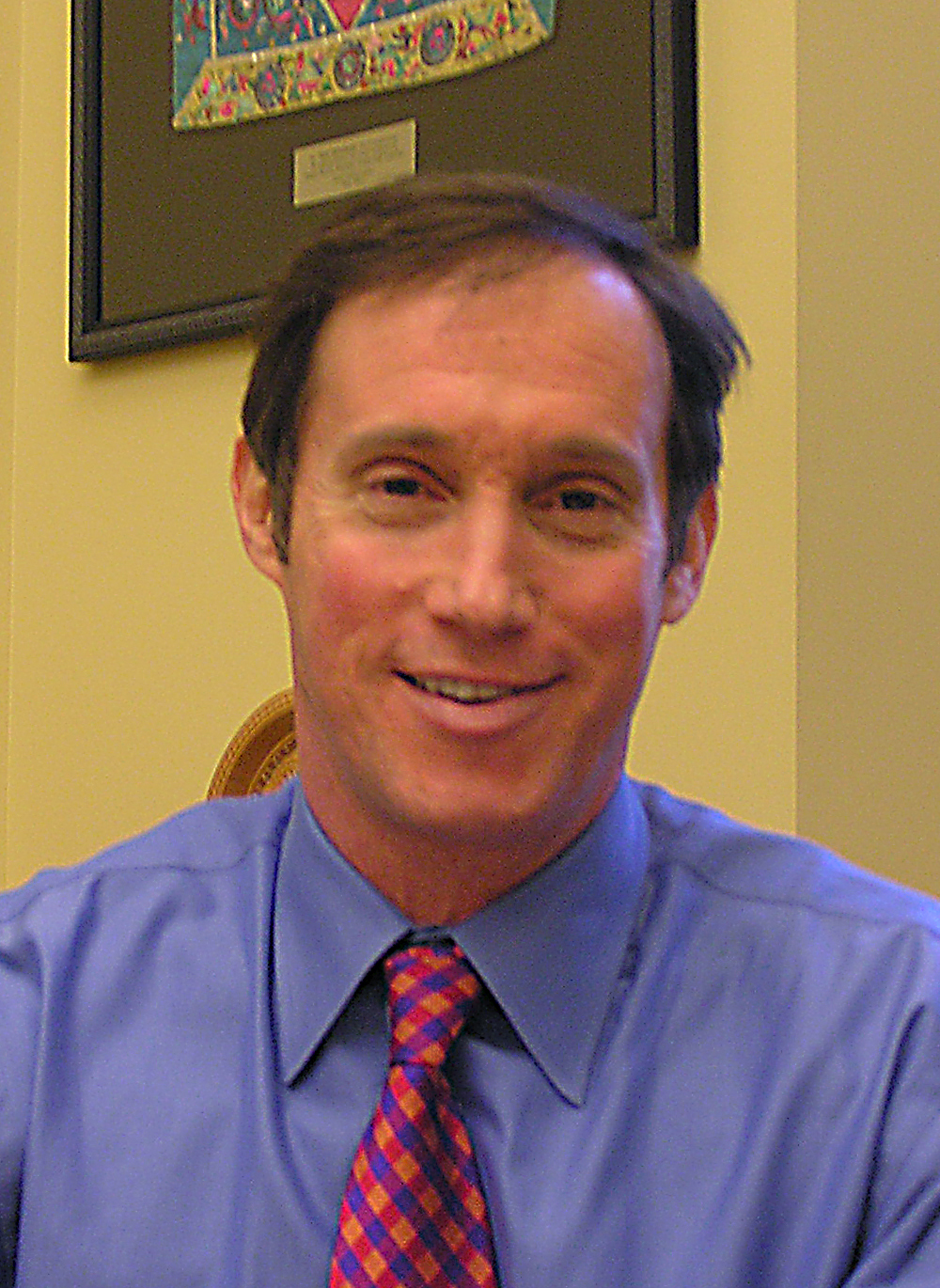

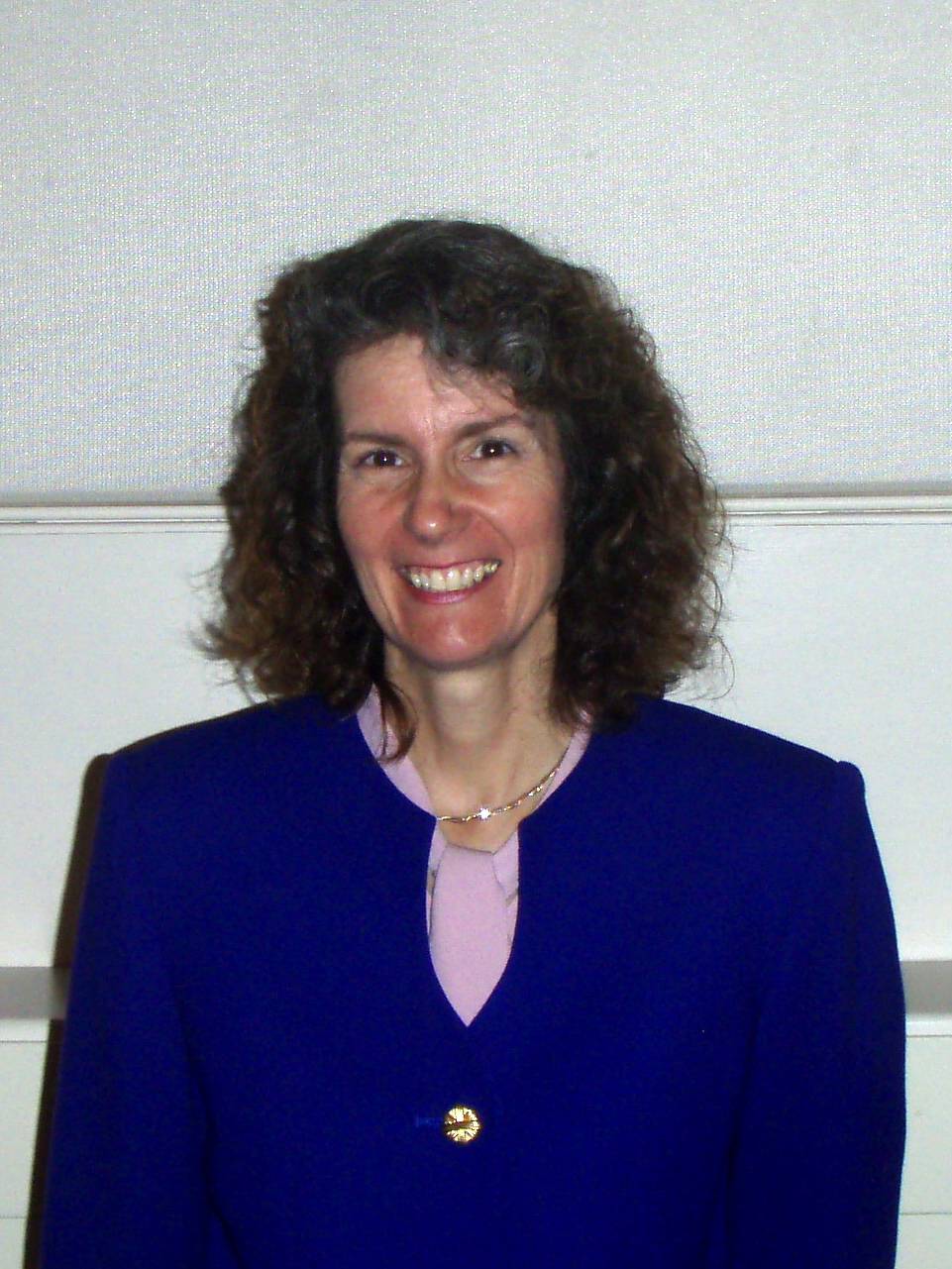
Candidate	Dan Saltzman	Amanda Fritz
Party	Nonpartisan	Nonpartisan
Popular vote	56,433	24,162
Percentage	57.48%	24.61%
City Commission before election
Dan Saltzman
Nonpartisan
Elected City Commission
Dan Saltzman
Nonpartisan

Dan Saltzman won re-election outright with 57.48% of the vote.

Position 3 election, 2006
Party	Candidate	Votes	%
Nonpartisan	Dan Saltzman	56,433	57.48%
Nonpartisan	Amanda Fritz	24,162	24.61%
Nonpartisan	Sharon Nasset	5,591	5.69%
Nonpartisan	Chris Iverson	5,072	5.17%
Nonpartisan	Lucinda L. Tate	3,313	3.07%
Nonpartisan	Michael S. Casper	2,296	2.34%
Nonpartisan	Watchman	1,248	1.27%
Write-in		373	0.38%
Total votes		98,185	100
