= 2018 Portland, Oregon, City Commission election =

The 2018 Portland City Commission elections were held on May 15, 2018, and November 6, 2018.

2 positions were up for election, Position 2 and Position 3, respectively.

== Position 2 ==
Portland City Commission Position 2 election
- May 15, 2018
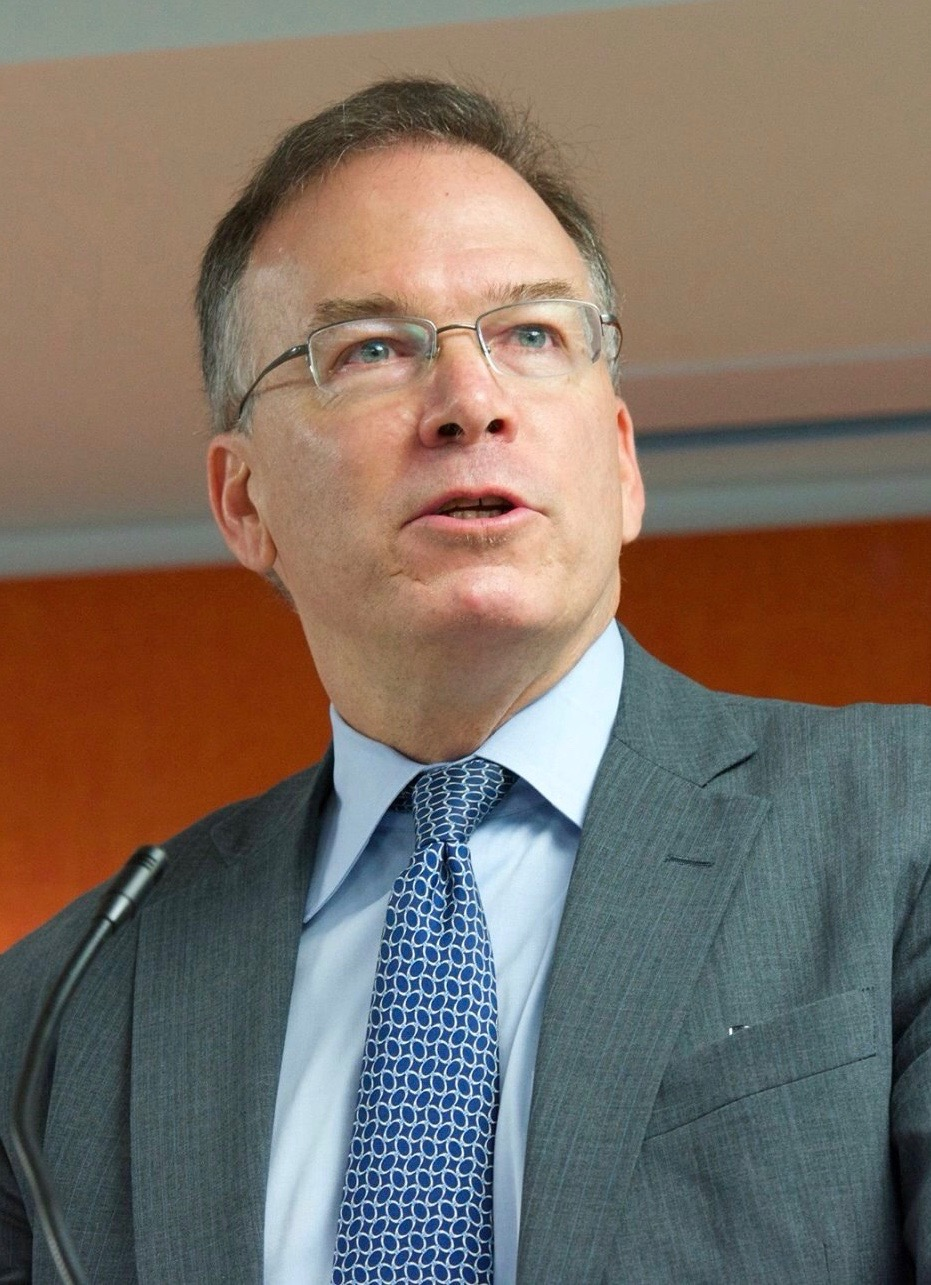

Candidate	Nick Fish	Julia DeGraw
Party	Nonpartisan	Nonpartisan
Popular vote	74,161	38,990
Percentage	61.81%	32.49%
City Commission before election
Nick Fish
Nonpartisan
Elected City Commission
Nick Fish
Nonpartisan

Incumbent Nick Fish won over 50% of the votes in the primary election, avoiding a runoff.

Primary election
Party	Candidate	Votes	%
Nonpartisan	Nick Fish	74,161	61.81%
Nonpartisan	Julia DeGraw	38,990	32.49%
Nonpartisan	Philip J. Wolfe	3,533	2.94%
Nonpartisan	Nicholas Sutton	2,764	2.30%
Nonpartisan	Write-ins	540	0.45%
Total votes		119,988	100

== Position 3 ==
Portland City Commission Position 3 election
- May 15, 2018 and November 6, 2018
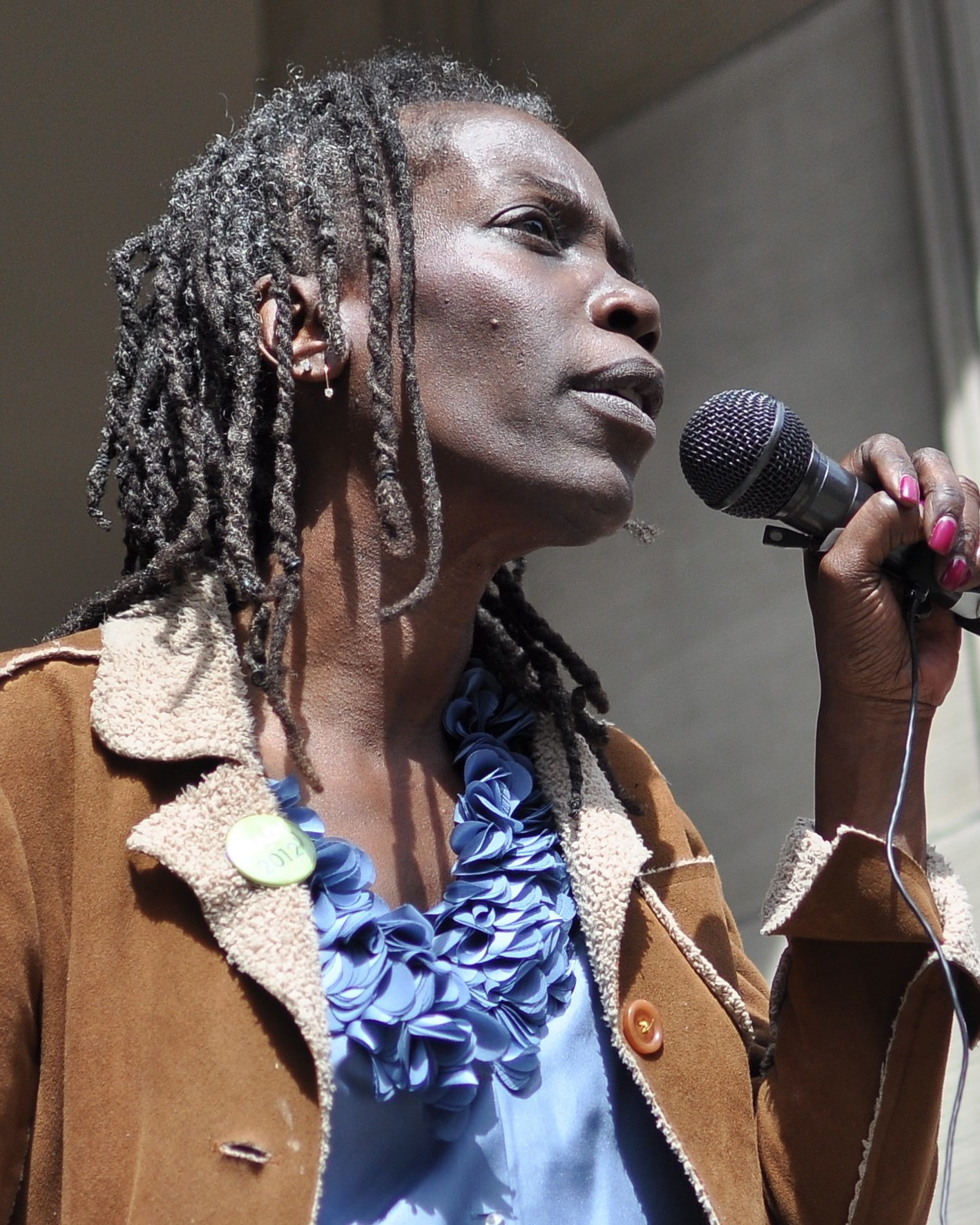

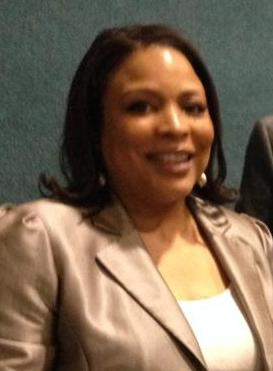
Candidate	Jo Ann Hardesty	Loretta Smith
Party	Nonpartisan	Nonpartisan
Popular vote	165,686	99,823
Percentage	61.81%	37.24%
City Commission before election
Dan Saltzman
Nonpartisan
Elected City Commission
Jo Ann Hardesty
Nonpartisan

Dan Saltzman, the longest serving Commissioner in Portland's history, announced that he would retire at the end of his term. Activist Jo Ann Hardesty was elected to replace him, defeating county commissioner Loretta Smith.

Primary election
Party	Candidate	Votes	%
Nonpartisan	Jo Ann Hardesty	56,364	46.31%
Nonpartisan	Loretta Smith	25,743	21.15%
Nonpartisan	Felecia Williams	13,198	10.84%
Nonpartisan	Andrea Valderrama	12,753	10.48%
Nonpartisan	Stuart Emmons	11,391	9.36%
Nonpartisan	Lew Humble	1,953	1.60%
Write-in		316	0.26%
Total votes		121,718	100.00%

Run-off election
Party	Candidate	Votes	%
Nonpartisan	Jo Ann Hardesty	165,686	61.81%
Nonpartisan	Loretta Smith	99,823	37.24%
Nonpartisan	Write-ins	2,538	0.95%
Total votes		268,047	100%
