= 2002 Portland, Oregon, City Commission election =

The 2002 Portland City Commission elections were held on May 21, 2002, and November 5, 2002, to elect two positions on the Portland, Oregon City Council, with a special election to elect an additional position held on September 17, 2002, and November 5, 2002.

Incumbents Erik Sten and Dan Saltzman both won re-election to positions 2 and three respectively. Both won outright by receiving over 50% of the vote in the primary, thereby avoiding a runoff. State Representative Randy Leonard won a general special election for position 4 outright with over 50% of the vote due to the resignation of Charlie Hales, who later became Mayor.

== Position 2 ==
Portland City Commission Position 2 election, 2002
- May 21, 2002 & November 5, 2002

Candidate	Erik Sten	Liz Callison	Mike Miliucci
Party	Nonpartisan	Nonpartisan	Nonpartisan
First round	64,203; 58.16%	24,704; 22.38%	15,444; 13.99%
Second round	111,253; 100%	Eliminated	Eliminated
Commissioner before election
Erik Sten
Elected Commissioner
Erik Sten

Position 2 primary election, 2002
Party	Candidate	Votes	%
Nonpartisan	Erik Sten	64,203	58.16%
Nonpartisan	Liz Callison	24,704	22.38%
Nonpartisan	Mike Miliucci	15,444	13.99%
Nonpartisan	Lew Humble	6,046	5.48%
Total votes		110,397	100

Position 2 general election, 2002
Party	Candidate	Votes	%
Nonpartisan	Erik Sten	111,253	100%
Total votes		111,253	100

== Position 3 ==
Portland City Commission Position 3 election, 2002
- May 21, 2002 & November 5, 2002
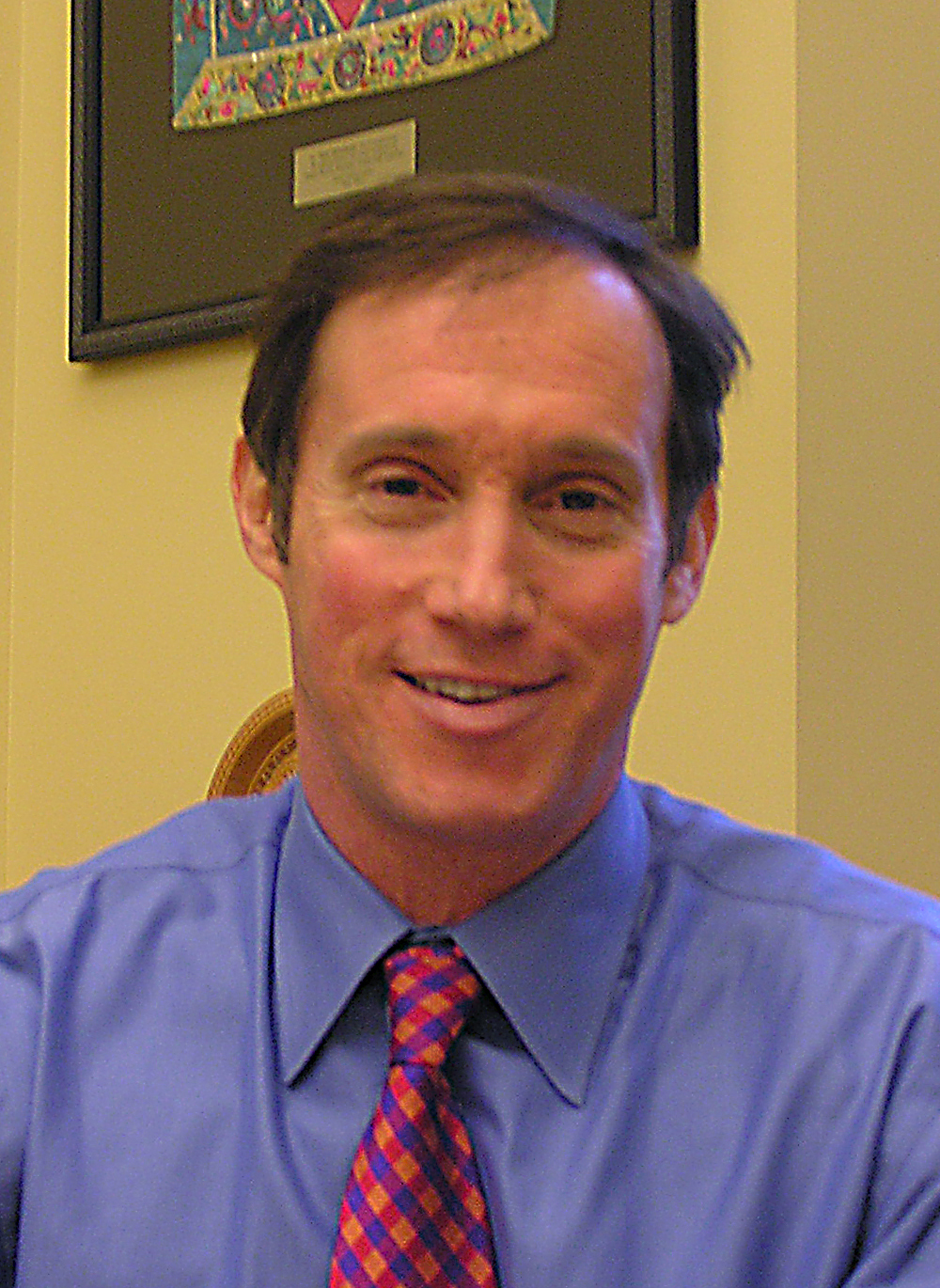

Candidate	Dan Saltzman	Peter Alexander	Sharon Nasset
Party	Nonpartisan	Nonpartisan	Nonpartisan
First round	69,321; 65.83%	17,319; 16.45%	16,511; 15.68%
Second round	110,092; 100%	Eliminated	Eliminated
Commissioner before election
Dan Saltzman
Elected Commissioner
Dan Saltzman

Position 3 primary election, 2002
Party	Candidate	Votes	%
Nonpartisan	Dan Saltzman	69,321	65.83%
Nonpartisan	Peter Alexander	17,319	16.45%
Nonpartisan	Sharon Nasset	16,511	15.68%
Nonpartisan	James R. Howerton-Smith	2,149	2.04%
Total votes		105,300	100

Position 3 general election, 2002
Party	Candidate	Votes	%
Nonpartisan	Dan Saltzman	110,092	100%
Total votes		110,092	100

== Position 4 (special) ==
Position 4 special primary election, 2002
Party	Candidate	Votes	%
Nonpartisan	Randy Leonard	26,891	26.29%
Nonpartisan	Serena Cruz	22,100	21.61%
Nonpartisan	Nick Fish	18,492	18.08%
Nonpartisan	J. P. Moss	7,912	7.74%
Nonpartisan	Liz Callison	5,107	4.99%
Nonpartisan	Wayne Trosino	3,902	3.81%
Nonpartisan	Clifford "Cliff" Walker	3,698	3.62%
Nonpartisan	Christian Gunther	3,562	3.48%
Nonpartisan	Sharon Nasset	2,754	2.69%
Nonpartisan	Josh Alpert	2,702	2.64%
Nonpartisan	John Myers	1,481	1.45%
Nonpartisan	Loren P. Bundeson	1,237	1.21%
Nonpartisan	Scott A. Bowmer	824	0.81%
Nonpartisan	Lulu R. Stroud-Johnson	750	0.73%
Nonpartisan	Lew Humble	589	0.58%
Nonpartisan	Ric Berrong	285	0.28%
Write-in			
Total votes		102,286	100

Portland City Commission Position 4 special election, 2002
- May 21, 2002 & November 5, 2002
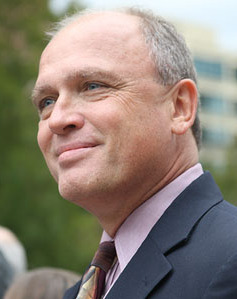

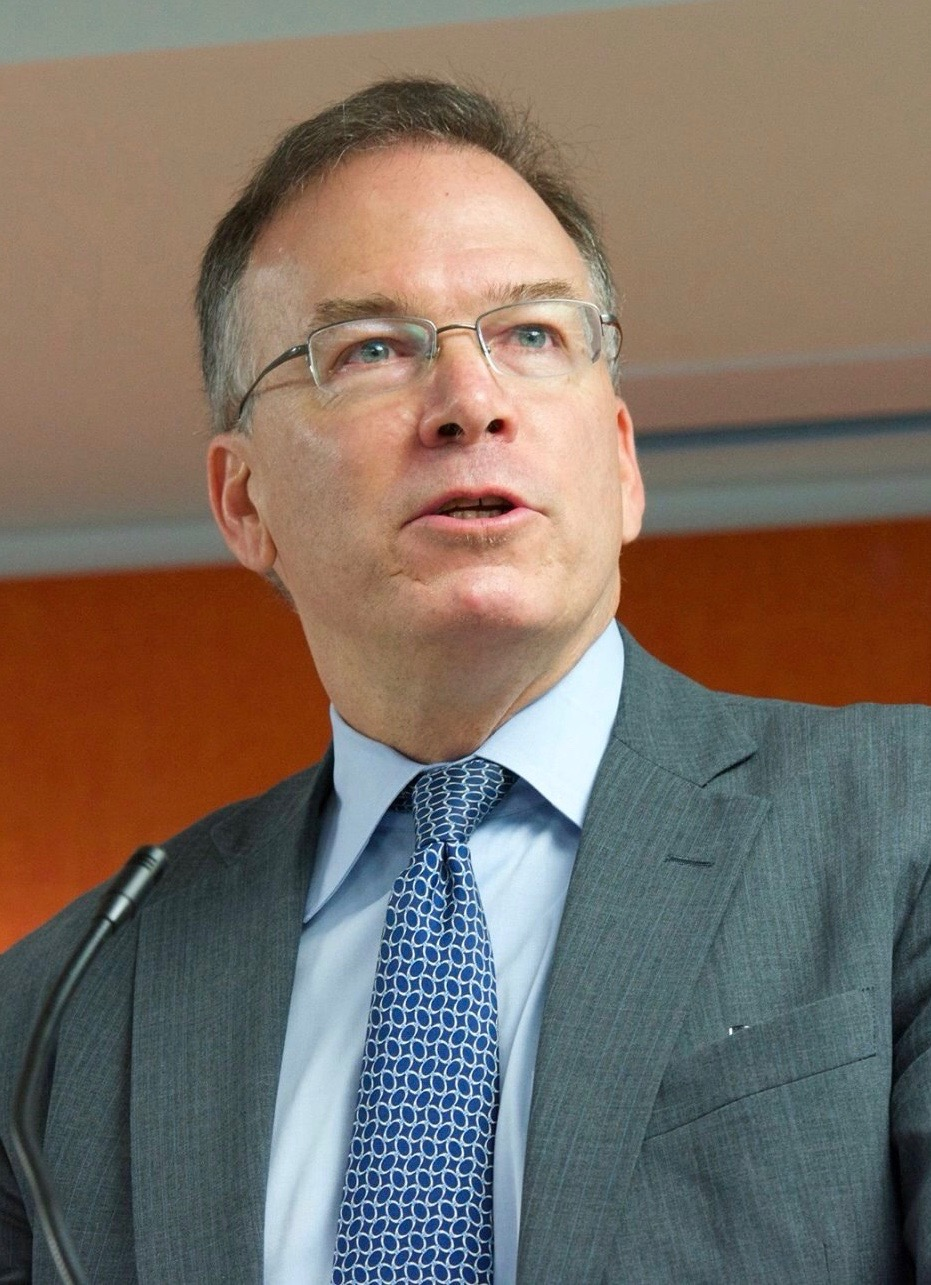
Candidate	Randy Leonard	Serena Cruz	Nick Fish
Party	Nonpartisan	Nonpartisan	Nonpartisan
First round	26,891; 26.29%	22,100; 21.61%	18,492; 18.08%
Second round	90,611; 53.62%	78,378; 46.38%
Commissioner before election
Charlie Hales (resigned)
Elected Commissioner
Randy Leonard

Position 4 special election, 2002
Party	Candidate	Votes	%
Nonpartisan	Randy Leonard	90,611	53.62%
Nonpartisan	Serena Cruz	78,378	46.38%
Total votes		168,989	100
