= 2008 Portland, Oregon, City Commission election =

The 2008 Portland City Commission elections were held on May 20, 2008, and November 4, 2008, to elect three positions on the Portland, Oregon City Council.

Two positions, 1 and 4, held regularly scheduled elections while position 2 held a special election to fill the remainder of Erik Sten's term after his retirement on April 4.

Lawyer and member of the prominent Fish family political dynasty Nick Fish and incumbent Randy Leonard won positions 2 and 4 respectively outright by receiving over 50% of the vote. Planning commission member Amanda Fritz did not receive over 50% and proceeded to a runoff election against non-profit executive Charles Lewis for position 1.

== Position 1 ==
Portland City Commission Position 1 election, 2008
- May 20, 2008 & November 4, 2008
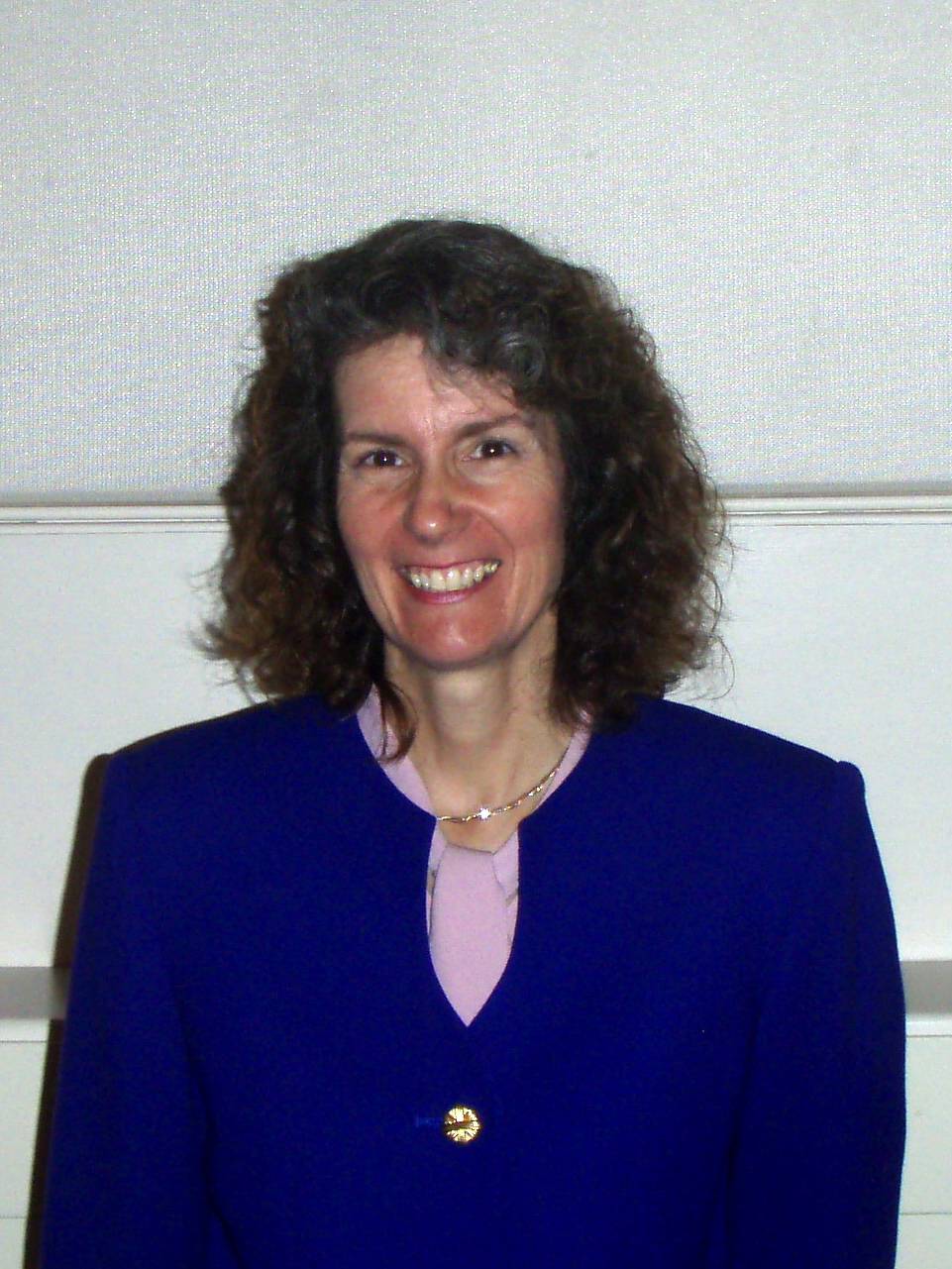

Candidate	Amanda Fritz	Charles Lewis	Jeff Bissonnette
Party	Nonpartisan	Nonpartisan	Nonpartisan
First round	64,173; 42.90%	18,941; 12.66%	18,501; 12.37%
Second round	156,168; 70.87%	63,579; 28.40%	Eliminated
Commissioner before election
Sam Adams
Elected Commissioner
Amanda Fritz

Amanda Fritz and Charles Lewis won the primary election and proceeded to the runoff election where Fritz won with 70.87% of the vote.

Position 1 primary election, 2008
Party	Candidate	Votes	%
Nonpartisan	Amanda Fritz	64,173	42.90%
Nonpartisan	Charles Lewis	18,941	12.66%
Nonpartisan	Jeff Bissonnette	18,501	12.37%
Nonpartisan	John Branam	18,114	12.11%
Nonpartisan	Mike Fahey	15,382	10.28%
Nonpartisan	Chris Smith	13,756	9.20%
Write-in		712	0.48%
Total votes		149,579	100

Position 1 runoff election, 2008
Party	Candidate	Votes	%
Nonpartisan	Amanda Fritz	156,168	70.87%
Nonpartisan	Charles Lewis	62,579	28.40%
Write-in		1604	0.73%
Total votes		220,351	100

== Position 2 (Special) ==
Portland City Commission Position 2 election, 2008
- May 20, 2008
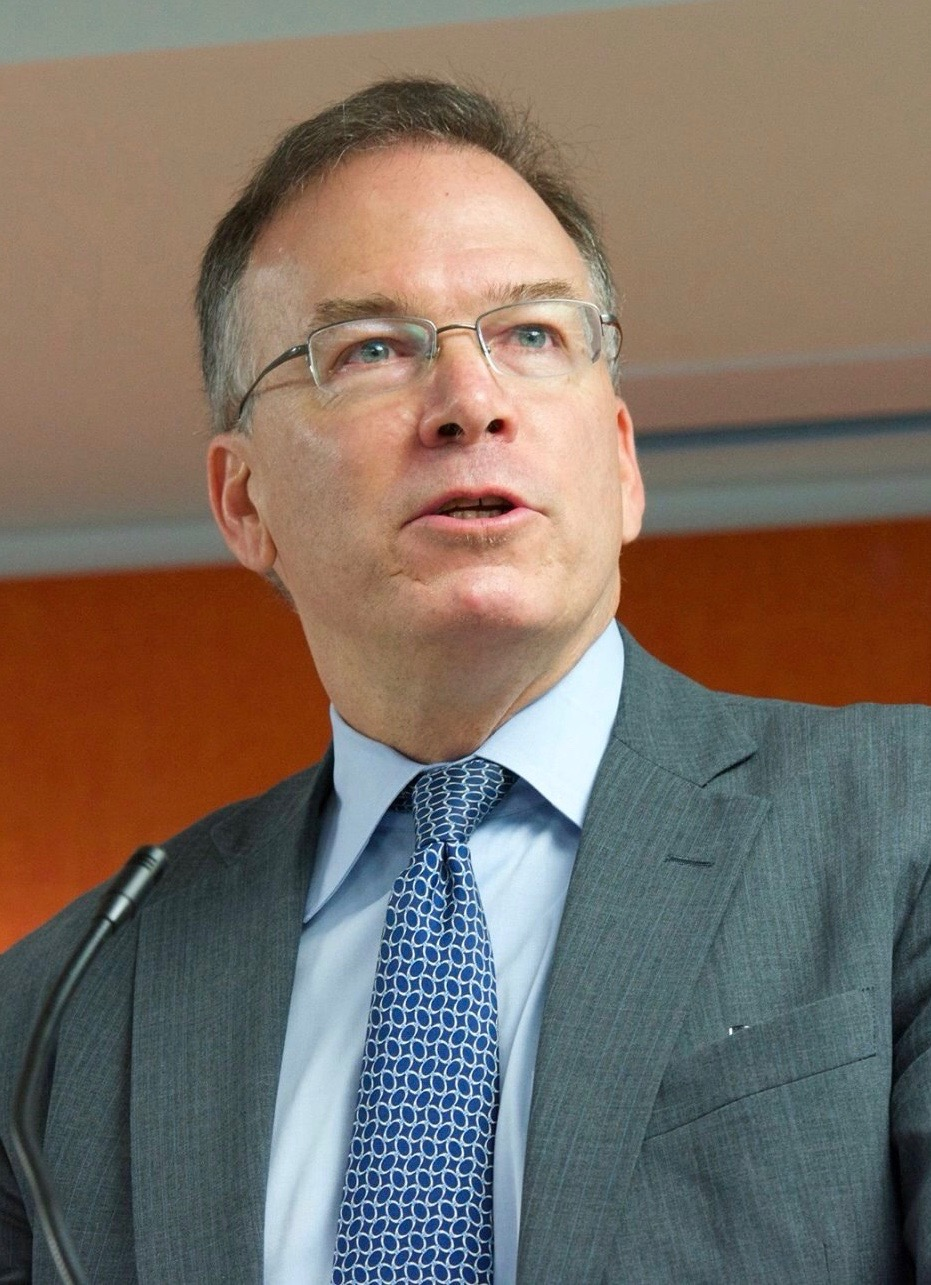

Candidate	Nick Fish	Jim Middaugh
Party	Nonpartisan	Nonpartisan
Popular vote	93,636	33,249
Percentage	61.36%	21.79%
City Commission before election
Erik Sten
Nonpartisan
Elected City Commission
Nick Fish
Nonpartisan

Nick Fish won the election outright with 61.36% of the vote.

Position 2 election, 2008
Party	Candidate	Votes	%
Nonpartisan	Nick Fish	93,636	61.36%
Nonpartisan	Jim Middaugh	33,249	21.79%
Nonpartisan	Fred Stewart	10,674	7%
Nonpartisan	Harold C. Williams II	7,946	5.21%
Nonpartisan	Edward "Ed" Garren	6,432	4.22%
Write-in		656	0.43%
Total votes		151,596	100%

== Position 4 ==
Portland City Commission Position 4 election, 2008
- May 20, 2008
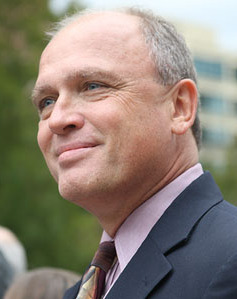

Candidate	Randy Leonard	Emily S. Ryan
Party	Nonpartisan	Nonpartisan
Popular vote	102,117	17,059
Percentage	71.72%	11.98%
City Commission before election
Randy Leonard
Nonpartisan
Elected City Commission
Randy Leonard
Nonpartisan

Incumbent Randy Leonard won reelection outright with 71.72% of the vote.

Position 4 election, 2008
Party	Candidate	Votes	%
Nonpartisan	Randy Leonard	102,117	71.72%
Nonpartisan	Emily S. Ryan	17,059	11.98%
Nonpartisan	Martha Perez	15,385	10.81%
Nonpartisan	Edward Kill	6,559	4.61%
Write-in		1,270	0.89%
Total votes		142,391	100%

== See also ==
- 2008 Portland, Oregon, mayoral election
