= 2006 Portland, Oregon, area elections =

Multnomah County highlighted in Oregon; Portland is mostly within the western part of the county.

Multnomah County, Oregon, the city of Portland, Oregon, and Metro (Oregon regional government) held elections on May 16 and November 7, 2006.

In the May primary, political newcomer Ted Wheeler unseated County Chair Diane Linn with 69% of the vote; incumbent Sheriff Bernie Giusto retained his post with 61% of the vote, defeating Donald DuPay and write-in candidate Paul van Orden, who won 11% of the vote; Lavonne Griffin-Valade defeated outgoing Representative Steve March as County Auditor; and a county ballot measure passed. Incumbent Portland City Commissioners Dan Saltzman and Erik Sten both kept their seats, though Sten narrowly avoided a runoff election.

In the general election, Jeff Cogen defeated Lew Frederick to succeed Serena Cruz on the County Commission; Cheryl Albrecht, Judith Hudson-Matarazzo, and Leslie Roberts each won contested races for the Circuit Court. Several countywide ballot measures appeared on the ballot as well.

(MD) indicates an endorsement from Multnomah Democrats.

== City of Portland ==
Portland, Oregon City Council

=== Council Position 2 (incumbent: Sten) ===
won in primary:

Yes Erik Sten (MD)

lost in primary:

- Emilie Boyles (MD)
- Ginny Burdick
- Dave Lister

=== Council Position 3 (incumbent: Saltzman) ===
won in primary:

Yes Dan Saltzman

lost in primary:

- Amanda Fritz (MD)
- Lucinda Tate
- Chris Iverson
- Sharon Nasset
- Michael Casper
- "Watchman"

== Metro ==
Metro (Oregon regional government)

=== Metro Councilor from District 1 ===
won in primary:

Yes Rod Park

lost in primary:

- Jim Duncan

=== Metro Councilor from District 4 ===
won in November General Election:

Yes Kathryn Harrington

lost runoff race in November General Election:

- Tom Cox

lost in Primary:

- Al Young
- Kathy Christy

=== Auditor ===
won in primary:

Yes Suzanne Flynn (was formerly Multnomah County Auditor; term limits prevented her from running for that position again.)

lost in primary:

- Alexis Dow (incumbent)

== Multnomah County ==
=== County Commission ===
==== Chair (incumbent: Diane Linn) ====
won in Primary:

Yes Ted Wheeler

lost in Primary:

- Diane Linn (MD)
- Terrence R. Smyth

==== District 2 (incumbent: Serena Cruz) ====
NOTE: Serena Cruz is unable to run due to term limit law.

runoff in November General Election:

Yes Jeff Cogen (Endorsed by the Oregonian & Willamette Week - view complete list)

- Lew Frederick (MD)

lost in primary:

- Alexander "Xander" Patterson
- Gary Hansen (MD)

=== County Auditor ===
won in Primary:

Yes LaVonne Griffin-Valade (web site)

lost in Primary:

- Steve March (MD)

=== Sheriff (incumbent: Bernie Giusto) ===
won in primary:

Yes Bernie Giusto

lost in primary:

- Donald L. DuPay
- Paul Van Orden (write-in candidate, received endorsement from Willamette Week; received about 10% of vote)

=== Circuit Court Judge ===
Elections for the Multnomah County Circuit Court (Oregons fourth judicial district) were unusually dynamic. Circuit court judges in Oregon are normally appointed by the governor of Oregon, and subsequently run for re-election as incumbents, rarely facing opposition. In 2006, three races were contested or competitive.

Position 31 was vacated by the retirement of Judge David Gernant; five candidates competed in the May primary election, with Cheryl Albrecht and Kathleen Payne advancing to the runoff in the general election. Albrecht won in November with 54% of the vote.

Position 28 opened with the death of Judge Cliff Freeman shortly before the filing deadline. Ten candidates filed for the seat (though Trung Tu, who had previously run for Position 31, withdrew his candidacy). Judith Hudson Matarazzo won the election.

Position 37 was the subject of great controversy. Youlee Yim You had been appointed by Governor Ted Kulongoski on August 9, 2006. Oregon law requires appointees to run for election after their appointment, so You filed for election, and was expected to be on the ballot as the incumbent. Leslie Roberts, a former neighbor of You, filed to oppose her, and then made a complaint that You was not qualified to run (due to a rule about the duration of her residence in Oregon). You's name was removed from the ballot.

Charles Henderson then entered the race as a write-in candidate. Roberts, who was unopposed on the ballot, won the race; Henderson won 23% of the vote. You was later re-appointed, and won election to a six-year term in 2008.

District 4

Position	incumbent	candidates
28	Cliff Freeman	Yes Judith Hudson Matarazzo: James J. McIntyre; Ulanda L. Watkins; Christopher D. Wright; Mary Overgaard; Mark K. Kramer; Charles L. Best; James E. Leuenberger; Theodore E. Sims
31	David Gernant	Yes Cheryl Albrecht: Kathleen Payne
37	Youlee Yim You	Yes Leslie Roberts: Charles Henderson; (write-in; earned 32,820 votes)

== See also ==
- Oregon's statewide elections, 2006
- Oregon gubernatorial election, 2006
- United States House of Representatives elections in Oregon, 2006
- Oregon primary election, 2006
