= Jody L. Stahancyk =

American attorney (born 1948)

Jody L. Stahancyk (born July 26, 1948) is an American elected official and attorney currently serving on the Clatsop Community College Board of Education. Between 1979 and 1982, Stahancyk was a pro tem judge on the Multnomah County Juvenile Court. She then became an Assistant Attorney General for the Oregon Department of Justice, working in the Consumer Protection Division. In 1986, Stahancyk entered private practice, founding Stahancyk, Kent & Hook P.C., a family law and estate planning firm in Portland, Oregon. Stahancyk was appointed to the Clatsop Community College Board of Education in 2021. She was elected to a full term in May 2023, garnering 97.6% of the vote.

In October 2015, Stahancyk publicly considered running for Portland City Commission against incumbent Amanda Fritz. She decided not to run in February 2016, stating she is "more of a problem-solver than a policy-maker."

Stahancyk's tenure on the Clatsop Community College Board of Education has attracted scrutiny. In 2023, she was the sole board member to vote against a departure package for then-President Chris Breitmeyer. Immediately after the vote, three board members resigned citing "dysfunction of the board as reasons for their resignations." In May 2024, Breitmeyer, former state senator Betsy Johnson, and two board members attended a private meeting at Stahancyk's home to discuss fundraising for Clatsop Community College's Marine and Environmental Research and Training Station. The meeting was criticized by board members who were not in attendance, who alleged "violation of board policy regulating communications among board members.".

In 2024, Stahancyk left the family law firm she founded.
