= Chloe Eudaly =

American politician and former bookstore owner

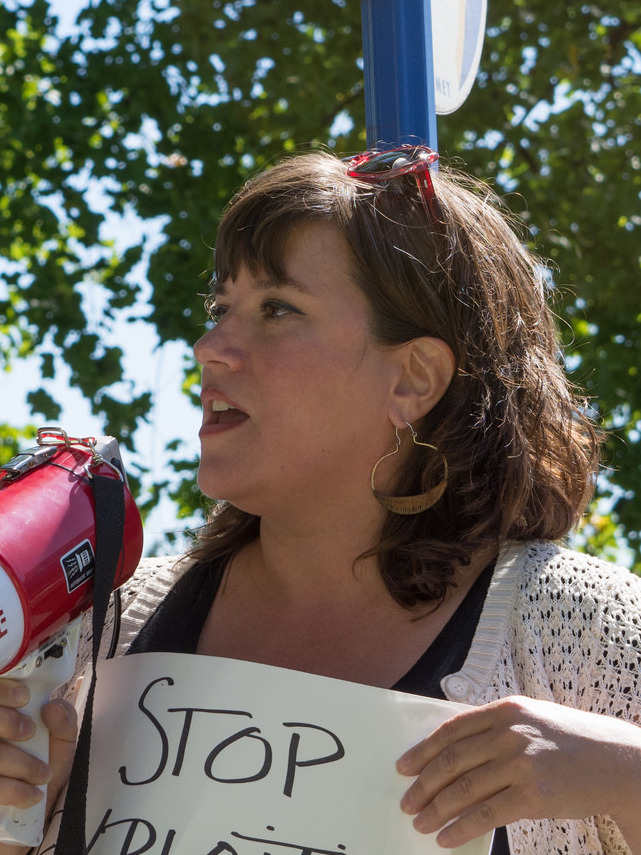
- Eudaly in 2016

Portland City Commissioner
- In office January 1, 2017 – January 1, 2021
- Preceded by: Steve Novick
- Succeeded by: Mingus Mapps

Personal details
- Born: 1969 or 1970 (age 55–56) Portland, Oregon, U.S.
- Party: Nonpartisan
- Education: GED (Tigard High School dropout)
- Occupation: Politician; bookstore owner

Clover "Chloe" Delight Esther Eudaly (1969/1970) is an American politician from Oregon who served as Portland's City Commissioner from 2017 to 2021. Eudaly lost her November 2020 re-election bid to Mingus Mapps.

== Portland City Commissioner ==
Eudaly won her position in 2016 by promising to focus on the needs of renters, people with disabilities, and people with lower incomes. Eudaly was elected to Position 4 on the Portland City Commission in November 2016. She had run as a tenants' rights advocate, pledging to encourage construction of lower cost housing. At the time, Portland was the last large American city in which elected commissioners oversaw city departments and, along with a separately elected mayor, formed the city council. Eudaly voted to defund the Portland police department and the proposal was defeated 2-3. Eudaly lost the election in November 2020 to Mingus Mapps.

=== Community and civic life ===
Eudaly was in charge of the Office of Community & Civic Life. Eudaly has a strong disdain for neighborhood associations and posit that they "tend to be dominated by older, white homeowners and push their interests rather than the needs of a diverse, growing city." When Eudaly took office, she inherited the Office of Neighborhood Involvement and she renamed it Office of Community & Civic Life (OCCL).

On September 18, 2019, Willamette Week reported that Eudaly had sent an angry email to her colleagues on City Council threatening them with political consequences if they don't support her position on neighborhood associations function and their relationship with the City.

=== Housing ===
==== Relocation ordinance ====
The ordinance was passed on a 4–1 vote, with Mayor Ted Wheeler and Commissioners Nick Fish and Dan Saltzman voting in favor with Eudaly, while Commissioner Amanda Fritz voted against it. Initially, the ordinance was passed as a temporary measure that was set to expire with Portland’s housing emergency declaration in October 2017. However, the ordinance became permanent by a unanimous vote on Portland City Council in 2018.

The fees are based on the size of the residential unit. For a studio or single room occupancy, a tenant is entitled to $2,900; for a one-bedroom: $3,300; for a two-bedroom: $4,200; and for a three-bedroom or larger: $4,500.

==== Fair Access In Renting (FAIR) ====
On June 19, 2019, Eudaly introduced and successfully passed the Fair Access In Renting (FAIR) ordinance into law. FAIR, which Eudaly worked on for two years, changes the way rental applications are screened in Portland. FAIR requires landlords to take a holistic approach to examining rental applications, requiring rental applications to be addressed on a first-come-first-serve basis. FAIR prioritizes accessible units for people with disabilities, limits landlords from requiring tenant incomes to be 2 to 2.5 times higher than rent and includes limits on using credit and criminal histories as criteria for denying a person’s rental application.

While voting in favor of FAIR, Eudaly testified that “It is no secret that Portland has a long history of overtly racist housing laws. What we fail to acknowledge more readily is that many of our current laws continue to uphold discriminatory practices. While the language may be less explicit now, the effect is just as clear: We continue to see communities of color, and especially Black residents, pushed to the margins of our city and beyond at an alarming rate.”

FAIR passed on a 3-1 vote, with Mayor Ted Wheeler and Commissioner Nick Fish voting in favor with Eudaly. Commissioner Amanda Fritz was the sole no vote, while Commissioner Jo Ann Hardesty was absent for the vote.

=== Transportation ===
In 2018, Eudaly became the head of the Portland Bureau of Transportation (PBOT). As transportation commissioner, Eudaly spearheaded the Rose Lane Project. Announced in June 2019, the Rose Lane Project was designed in response to the Enhanced Transit Corridors Plan (ETC), which was adopted by City Council on June 20, 2018. The Rose Lane Project will dedicate bus-only lanes throughout the city and will adjust traffic lights to give buses a head start at intersections.

In trial runs for the Rose Lane Project, PBOT installed a bus and bike-only lane on Southwest Madison Street, a bus-only lane on Northwest Everett Street, and a bus-only lane on the Burnside Bridge. TriMet lines on these routes saw decreases in delays of up to 76%, with buses crossing the Burnside Bridge nearly two minutes faster. On February 13, 2020, the Rose Lane Project was unanimously approved by Portland City Council.

== Personal life ==
Eudaly grew up near Forest Grove, Oregon, moving to the Portland suburbs at age nine. Eudaly attended Tigard High School, but dropped out and moved to Portland in 1988. She opened her bookstore, Reading Frenzy, in 1994. She is a founder of "maker's space for independent publishers" called Independent Publishing Resource Center. Eudaly resides in the Woodlawn neighborhood, and has a son, Henry. Eudaly self-identifies as queer.
