= Loretta Smith =

American politician (born 1966)

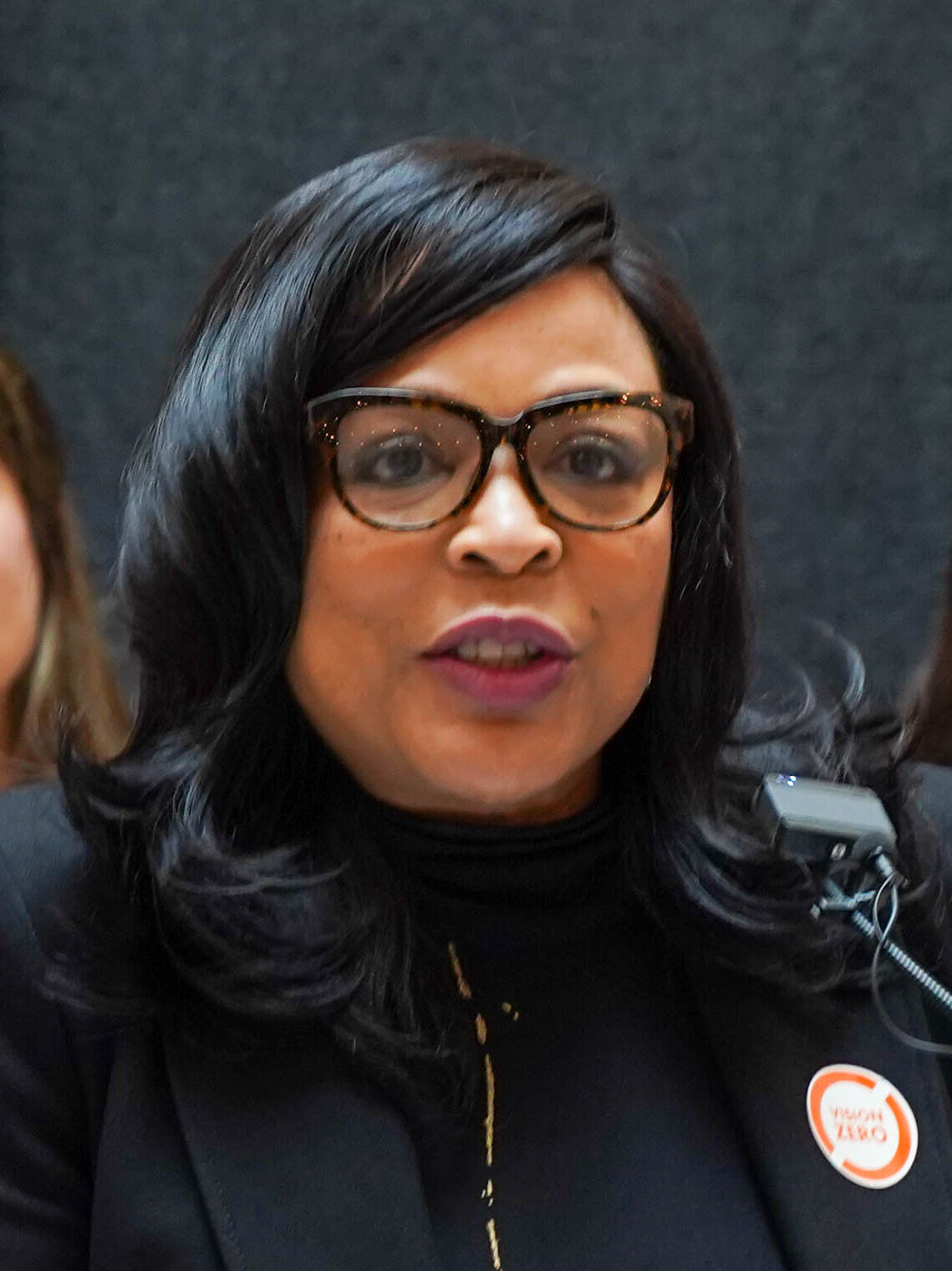
- Smith in 2025

Member of Portland City Council from District 1
- Incumbent
- Assumed office January 1, 2025 Serving with Candace Avalos and Jamie Dunphy
- Preceded by: office established

Multnomah County Commissioner
- In office January 2011 – January 2019
- Preceded by: Jeff Cogen
- Succeeded by: Susheela Jayapal
- Constituency: 2nd district

Personal details
- Born: 1966 (age 59–60) Grand Rapids, Michigan, U.S.
- Party: Democratic
- Children: 1
- Education: Oregon State University (BA)

Loretta Smith (born 1966) is an American politician and businesswoman who is a member of the Portland City Council from District 1. She previously served as a Multnomah County commissioner from 2011 to 2018. She ran unsuccessful campaigns for Portland City Council in 2018 and 2020. Smith was a candidate for Oregon's 6th congressional district in the 2022 election, a new seat created after the 2020 United States census.

== Early life and education ==
Smith was born in Grand Rapids, Michigan, in 1966.

== Career ==
Soon after graduating college, Smith got a job as a staffer for then-U.S. Representative Ron Wyden. She remained on his staff for 21 years, eventually becoming his field representative.

=== Multnomah County Commission ===
Smith began her own political career by running for Multnomah County commissioner in 2010. She came in second place in the initial election, and advanced to the runoff, which she won by 26 percentage points. During her first term, Smith focused on investments in programs helping poor youth. She served on the Portland Metro Workforce Development Board, which aims to curb the unemployment rate especially among people of color. Smith won reelection in 2014 with little opposition.

During her second term, Willamette Week reported that Smith disproportionately spent her office budget on travel and nonprofit contributions. In 2016, the state of Oregon mistakenly claimed she owed $36,000 in taxes and fees, but in 2017 admitted it had made an error. In 2017, Smith was accused by two former staffers of "unprofessional and harassing conduct" and creating a hostile work environment. She was also accused of using county funds for personal expenses such as grocery shopping. Some Smith supporters questioned the unsubstantiated accusations and claimed she was treated harshly because she was a black woman, describing it as "a political lynching".

Due to term limits, Smith was not able to run again for County Commission and ran for Portland City Council in 2018.

In 2020, Smith ran in a special election for City Council to succeed Nick Fish, who had died in office. She earned the support of U.S. Senator Ron Wyden, Oregon Labor Commissioner Val Hoyle, several labor organizations, including Northwest Oregon Labor Council - AFL-CIO, Portland Fire Fighters Association, and SEIU Local 49, as well as NARAL Pro-Choice Oregon and Basic Rights Oregon. Smith came in first place in a crowded field, but lost narrowly to local schools foundation CEO Dan Ryan in the August runoff.

=== Business ===
In 2019, Smith started her own small business, a communications consultancy called Dream Big Communications specializing in building coalitions, bringing people together, and improving communities.

=== 2022 congressional campaign ===
On June 22, 2021, Smith announced her candidacy for Oregon's 6th congressional district, when the district's boundaries had yet to be drawn. She finished in 4th place out of a total of 9 candidates in the Democratic primary.

== Personal life ==
Smith has one son, Jordan, born in 1990, whom she raised as a single mother.

== Electoral history ==
2010 Multnomah County Commission District 2 election
Party	Candidate	Votes	%
Nonpartisan	Karol Collymore	10,527	35.88%
Nonpartisan	Loretta Smith	5,397	18.40%
Nonpartisan	Tom Markgraf	4,029	13.73%
Nonpartisan	Gary D. Hansen	2,663	9.08%
Nonpartisan	Maria C. Rubio	1,951	6.65%
Nonpartisan	Paul van Orden	1,790	6.10%
Nonpartisan	Chuck Currie	1,785	6.08%
Nonpartisan	Roberta Phillip	1,076	3.67%
Other	Write-ins	122	0.42%
Total votes		29,340	100.00%

2010 Multnomah County Commission District 2 runoff
Party	Candidate	Votes	%
Nonpartisan	Loretta Smith	34,303	62.79%
Nonpartisan	Karol Collymore	20,329	37.21%
Total votes		54,632	100.00%

2014 Multnomah County Commission District 2 election
Party	Candidate	Votes	%
Nonpartisan	Loretta Smith	23,644	78.54%
Nonpartisan	Bruce Broussard	3,595	11.94%
Nonpartisan	Teressa Raiford	1,986	6.60%
Nonpartisan	Kelvin Hall	881	2.93%
Total votes		30,106	100.00%

2018 Portland City Commission Position 3 election
Party	Candidate	Votes	%
Nonpartisan	Jo Ann Hardesty	56,364	46.31%
Nonpartisan	Loretta Smith	25,743	21.15%
Nonpartisan	Felicia Williams	13,198	10.84%
Nonpartisan	Stuart Emmons	11,391	9.36%
Nonpartisan	Lew Humble	1,953	1.61%
Other	Write-ins	316	0.26%
Total votes		121,718	100.00%

2018 Portland City Commission Position 3 runoff
Party	Candidate	Votes	%
Nonpartisan	Jo Ann Hardesty	165,686	61.81%
Nonpartisan	Loretta Smith	99,823	37.24%
Other	Write-ins	2,538	0.95%
Total votes		268,047	100.00%

2020 Portland City Commission Position 2 election
Party	Candidate	Votes	%
Nonpartisan	Loretta Smith	39,304	18.80%
Nonpartisan	Dan Ryan	34,693	16.60%
Nonpartisan	Tera Hurst	30,982	14.82%
Nonpartisan	Julia DeGraw	26,441	12.65%
Nonpartisan	Sam Chase	23,466	11.23%
Nonpartisan	Margot Black	14,091	6.74%
Nonpartisan	Cynthia Castro	7,762	3.71%
Nonpartisan	Jack Kerfoot	7,195	3.44%
Nonpartisan	Terry Parker	5,095	2.44%
Nonpartisan	Jeff Lang	3,837	1.84%
Nonpartisan	Ronault "Polo" Catalani	3,512	1.68%
Nonpartisan	Ryan Farmer	2,407	1.15%
Nonpartisan	Aquiles U. Montas	2,175	1.04%
Nonpartisan	James "Jas" Davis	1,842	0.88%
Nonpartisan	Alicea Maurseth	1,632	0.78%
Nonpartisan	Diana Gutman	1,597	0.76%
Nonpartisan	Walter Wesley	1,405	0.67%
Nonpartisan	Rachelle Dixon	1,097	0.53%
Other	Write-ins	498	0.24%
Total votes		209,031	100.00%

2020 Portland City Commission Position 2 runoff
Party	Candidate	Votes	%
Nonpartisan	Dan Ryan	88,433	51.17%
Nonpartisan	Loretta Smith	83,073	48.07%
Other	Write-ins	1,324	0.77%
Total votes		172,830	100.00%

2022 Democratic Primary, Oregon's 6th congressional district
Party	Candidate	Votes	%
Democratic	Andrea Salinas	26,101	36.77%
Democratic	Carrick Flynn	13,052	18.39%
Democratic	Cody Reynolds	7,951	11.20%
Democratic	Loretta Smith	7,064	9.95%
Democratic	Matt West	5,658	7.97%
Democratic	Kathleen Harder	5,510	7.76%
Democratic	Teresa Alonso Leon	4,626	6.52%
Democratic	Ricky Barajas	292	0.41%
Democratic	Greg Goodwin	217	0.31%
Other	Write-ins	508	0.72%
Total votes		70,979	100%
