= Margot Black =

American activist

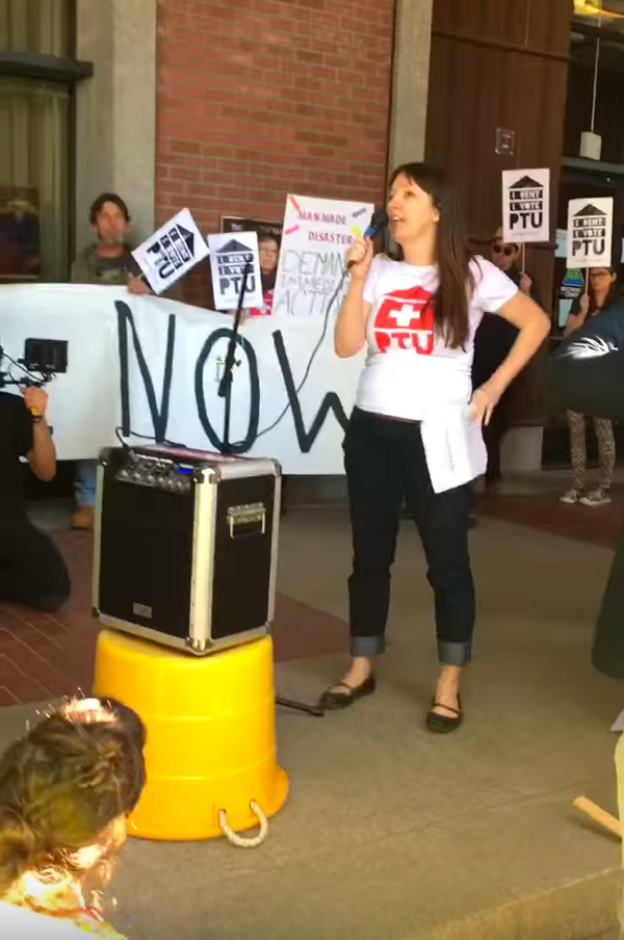
- Black addressing a rally, April 2016
- Born: October 1978 (age 47–48)
- Education: Lewis & Clark College (BA); University of Oregon (MS)
- Occupations: Tenant rights advocate; past Director, Symbolic & Quantitative Resource Center, Lewis & Clark College; past college mathematics instructor
- Known for: Co-founder, Portland Tenants United

Margot Black (born 1978) is an American tenant rights organizer, activist, grass-roots lobbyist and former political candidate. She helped found and was co-chair of Portland Tenants United, Portland's metro-wide tenant union focused on tenants' rights to secure, safe, affordable and equitable housing, tenant-union organizing, eviction prevention, and providing emergency assistance for renters navigating housing law.

Black helped draft Portland’s Relocation Assistance ordinance passed in 2017, served on Portland’s Rental Services Commission, and advised on formulation of the Fair Access in Renting (FAIR) ordinance in 2019.

Black was one of 18 candidates in the May 2020 primary election of Portland City Council. She ran for the seat held until December 2019 by the late city commissioner Nick Fish and ultimately won by Dan Ryan.

== Early life and academic career ==
Black was born in 1978 in Salt Lake City, Utah. She experienced early years of poverty with intermittent homelessness and foster care shaped by her mother’s severe mental illness, until her grandmother gained custody of Black and her younger sister. In 1997 Black graduated from high school, moved to Portland with her then partner, and gave birth to her first child.

In 1999 Black started classes at Portland State University as working single mother, and in 2001 won a scholarship to attend Lewis & Clark College, where she graduated with a B.A. in 2003. Admitted to graduate school at the University of Oregon, she earned an M.S. in Mathematics in 2005 and passed her Ph.D. qualifying exams. She returned to Portland as an instructor at Portland Community College. In 2012 Lewis & Clark College hired Black to direct the Symbolic & Quantitative Resource Center, where she worked until 2018.

== Portland Tenants United and Renters Rights ==
Having experienced a no-cause eviction as a young single mother in Portland, and again in 2012 with a husband and children, Black became increasingly alarmed by the growing Portland housing crisis and skyrocketing eviction rates that displaced longtime low and moderate income Portland residents and broke up geographic centers of communities of color. Black initiated social media-based mutual aid with the Facebook group PDX Renters Unite, began working with others including Chloe Eudaly who were also using social media networks to mobilize around renters rights, and conducted research as a member of a Portland City Club study group on affordable housing. In 2015, Black co-founded Portland Tenants United (PTU), which pursued multiple methods of pressing for tenant rights. Black and PTU have supported renters in organizing tenant unions with actions including taking demands to building complex owners and managers, rent strikes, generating media coverage, and securing support from local officials. PTU has organized protests demanding a rent freeze and an end to no-cause evictions, and joined resistance to sweeps against camps of houseless people.

Electorally, PTU was a key force mobilizing support for the election of pro-tenant City Council candidate Chloe Eudaly in her upset victory against city commissioner Steve Novick in 2016. Black and PTU also have challenged longstanding neoliberal assumptions in Oregon housing politics, including the ideas that market rate rents are natural, that rent control is never justified, and that high end apartment and condominium development will lower rents in working class housing by increasing housing supply. Black argues that renters’ right to secure, safe housing is more important than landlord property rights, and mobilizes support by encouraging tenants to see their problems in that light. Unconstrained by orthodox assumptions, Black and PTU have developed novel approaches to housing policy and law with legislative allies, such as Portland’s Relocation Assistance Ordinance, which passed with leadership from the newly elected Chloe Eudaly in 2017.

In the 2017 Oregon legislative session, long-time state senator and landlord Rod Monroe so weakened a PTU-influenced tenant rights bill that PTU felt forced to reverse course and oppose the amended version. Black led a raucous demonstration at the State Capitol, followed by a campaign to publicly expose Monroe’s role that led two opponents to challenge him in the 2018 primary, and to his defeat by Shemia Fagan.

Black then served as an advisor in the 2018 campaign that elected Jo Ann Hardesty to Portland City Council.

In February, 2019, Shemia Fagan co-sponsored a tenant protection bill in the 2019 legislative session, that did more than the amended bill that PTU had opposed in 2017. Black regarded the bill as still inadequate, and accused lawmakers of "betrayal", speaking to Willamette Week as a member of PTU.

By March, 2019, Black had been reelected as co-chair of PTU, and stated that she was "done apologizing for being a fierce, outspoken, and powerful woman".

PTU and Black worked closely with Eudaly and her staff on the Fair Access In Renting (F.A.I.R.) Ordinance of 2019. In March 2020, in an open letter to Oregon governor Kate Brown, Black called for a statewide rent amnesty, robust protection against evictions, and other tenant protection in response to the COVID-19 pandemic.
