= Erik Sten =

American politician (born 1967)

Portland City Commissioner
- In office January 1, 1997 – April 4, 2008
- Preceded by: Earl Blumenauer
- Succeeded by: Nick Fish

Personal details
- Born: October 1967 (age 58–59) New Haven, Connecticut, U.S.
- Party: Democratic
- Education: Stanford University (BA)

Erik Sten (born October 1967 in New Haven, Connecticut) is an American politician who served as a member of the Portland City Commission from 1997 to 2008.

== Early life and education ==
Sten was born in New Haven, Connecticut and raised in Portland, Oregon. He earned a Bachelor of Arts degree in English from Stanford University in 1989.

== Career ==
In the mid-1990s, Sten was a founding member of X-PAC, a group of politically minded young citizens, and has participated heavily in the Oregon Bus Project.

Sten was first elected to Position 2 on the Portland City Commission in 1996, defeating Chuck Duffy. He ran successful campaigns for re-election in 1998, 2002, and 2006.

As a Commissioner, Sten was an early supporter of Portland's publicly financed elections system. In 2005, he was named as one of Oregon's 15 most influential people.

During the 2000 presidential election, Sten was an Oregon state co-chair of GoreNet. GoreNet was a group that supported the Al Gore campaign with a focus on grassroots and online organizing as well as hosting small dollar donor events.

He resigned from his position April 4, 2008, and was succeeded by attorney Nick Fish.

After leaving office, Sten relocated to Seattle, Washington. In 2019, it was announced that Sten had joined Strategies 360, a political consulting and lobbying firm, as an advisor.
