= Amanda Fritz =

British-American politician and retired psychiatric nurse

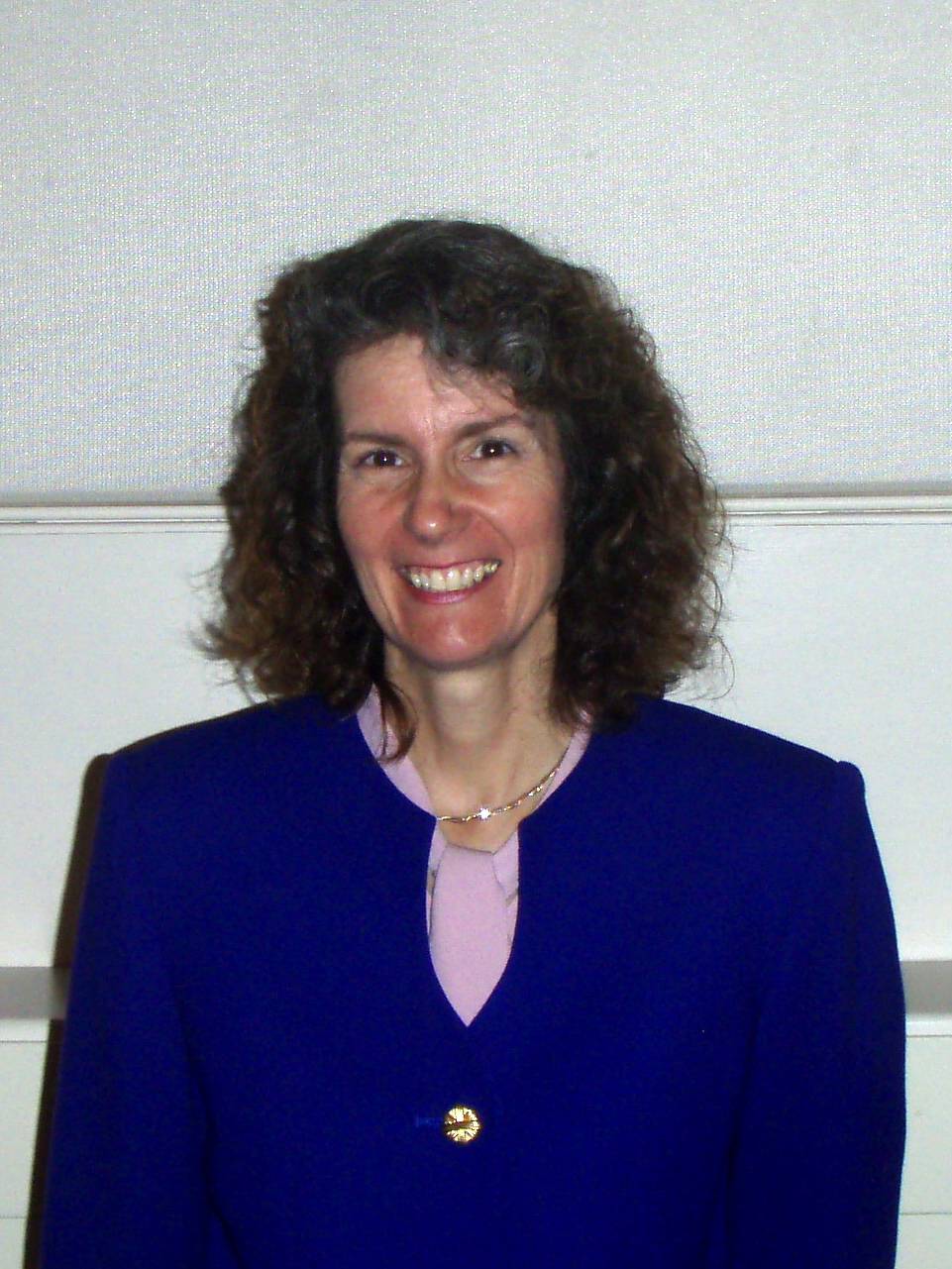
- Fritz in 2008

Portland City Commissioner
- In office January 1, 2009 – December 31, 2020
- Preceded by: Sam Adams
- Succeeded by: Carmen Rubio

Personal details
- Born: April 1958 (age 68) England, United Kingdom
- Party: Democratic
- Spouse: Steve Fritz (1982–2014; his death)
- Education: University of Cambridge (BS, MS)
- Occupation: Politician, nurse

Amanda Fritz (born April 1958) is a British-American politician and retired psychiatric nurse from the U.S. state of Oregon. Before being elected to Portland's City Council in 2008, Fritz was a neighborhood activist and seven-year member of the Portland Planning Commission. She was also the first candidate to win public financing under Portland's Clean Elections system in 2006, though she lost to incumbent Dan Saltzman in the first round of that year's election.

She was elected to City Council in the November 2008 election. She succeeded Commissioner Sam Adams, who vacated the seat to run for mayor.

== Early life and education ==
Fritz was born in England and grew up in Leeds, West Yorkshire. After graduating from the University of Cambridge, where she earned a bachelor's and a master's degree in Biological Sciences. She moved to the United States in 1979, where she attended nursing school in Pittsburgh, Pennsylvania and then moved to Rochester, New York. She relocated to Portland in 1986.

== Career ==
Upon moving to Portland from New York, Fritz began working at Oregon Health & Science University (OHSU) as an inpatient nurse in the hospital's psychiatry department.

In 1996, she was appointed to the city's Planning Commission, and served on the Commission until 2003. In 1999, Fritz was noted as a Planning Commission member who valued an emerging online list for contributing to the discourse on planning in the city.

=== City council ===
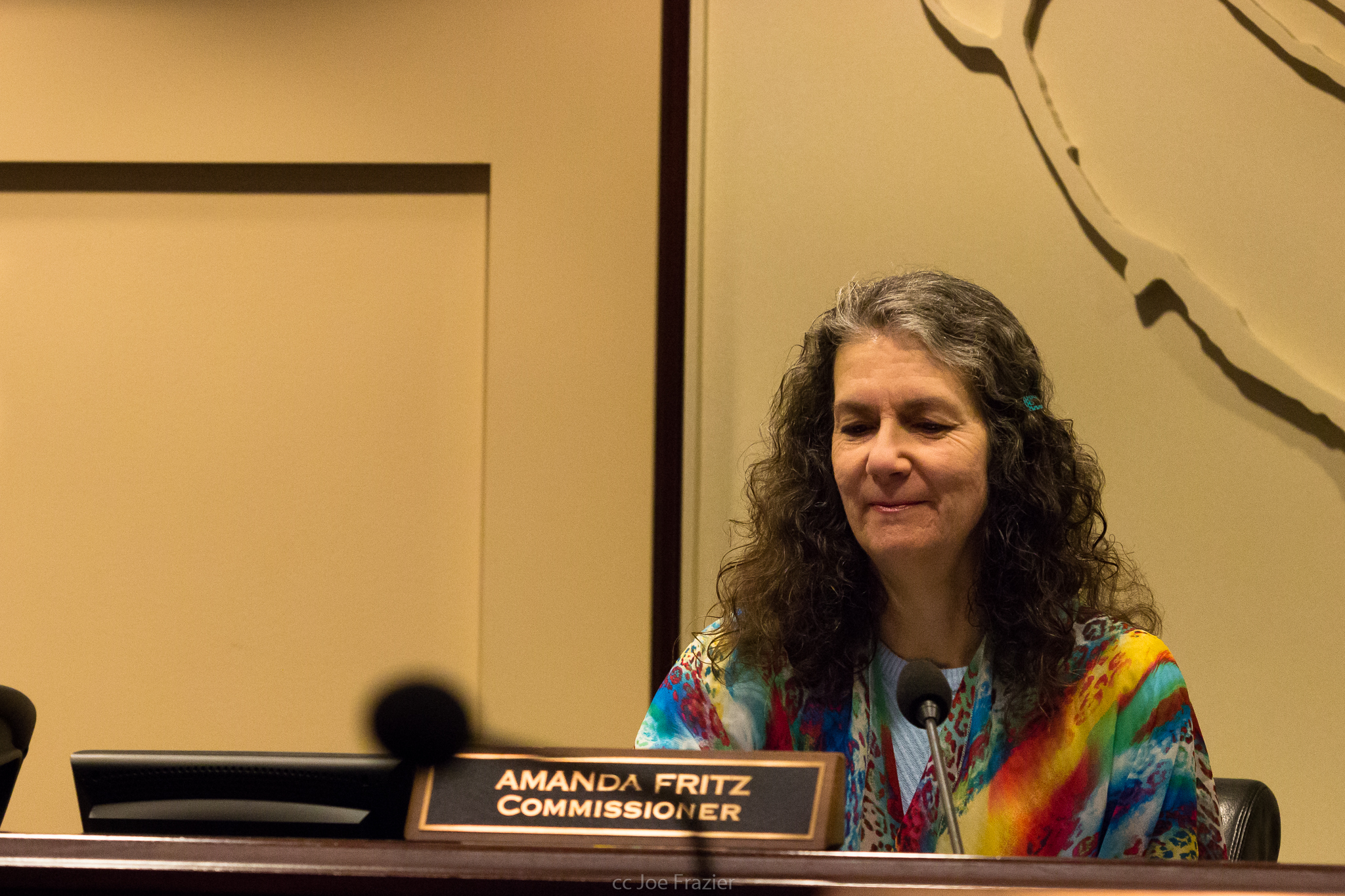
Fritz at a meeting of the City Commission

In 2008, Fritz became the first non-incumbent to successfully run under Portland's public financing system. She took the most votes in the May primary election (43%) in a field of six candidates, and faced second-place finisher Charles Lewis (13%) in a November runoff election. Fritz and Lewis were among the candidates who each qualified for $150,000 in public financing by collecting over 1,000 five-dollar contributions, and pledging to accept no other campaign contributions. Each received an additional $200,000 for the runoff election. Fritz defeated Lewis with 70% of the vote in the runoff. Fritz was also the first candidate to qualify for public funds under the program, in her first race, when she challenged incumbent Dan Saltzman in the 2006 election. In the 2008 race, her decisive victory in the primary enabled her to reach out to new classes of constituents; she was noted for expanding her appeal from neighborhood activists to the business community, and placing a strong emphasis on fiscal responsibility.

She has been an advocate of the public financing system since that first race, and wrote in support of it after winning the 2008 election. Voters overturned it via referendum in 2010. Fritz credits the Public Campaign Finance system for allowing her the independence that led to saving Portland ratepayers $500 million by changing policy choices in the Portland Water Bureau in 2009.

In June 2013, a shuffling of bureaus among the commissioners by new Mayor Charlie Hales saw Fritz assigned the Parks Bureau and the Bureau of Development Services, in place of her previous assignments.

Fritz won re-election in 2016. During the city's fiscal year of 2017-2018, she cast the deciding vote on the Council to adopt the campaign financing reform program "Open and Accountable Elections", which would award public matching funds to candidates who agreed to not take large contributions, or any contributions from corporations and PACs. The system was launched in the 2020 election cycle.

On April 5, 2019, Fritz announced that she would not seek re-election to Portland City Council, saying that she hoped a larger field of candidates would run for her seat using the Open and Accountable Elections system. She retired in January 2021.

== Personal life ==
Fritz's husband, Steve, whom she married in 1982, died in a car crash in September 2014. Steve Fritz had worked for 27 years as a psychiatrist at Oregon State Hospital in Salem. The couple had three children.
