= Dan Saltzman =

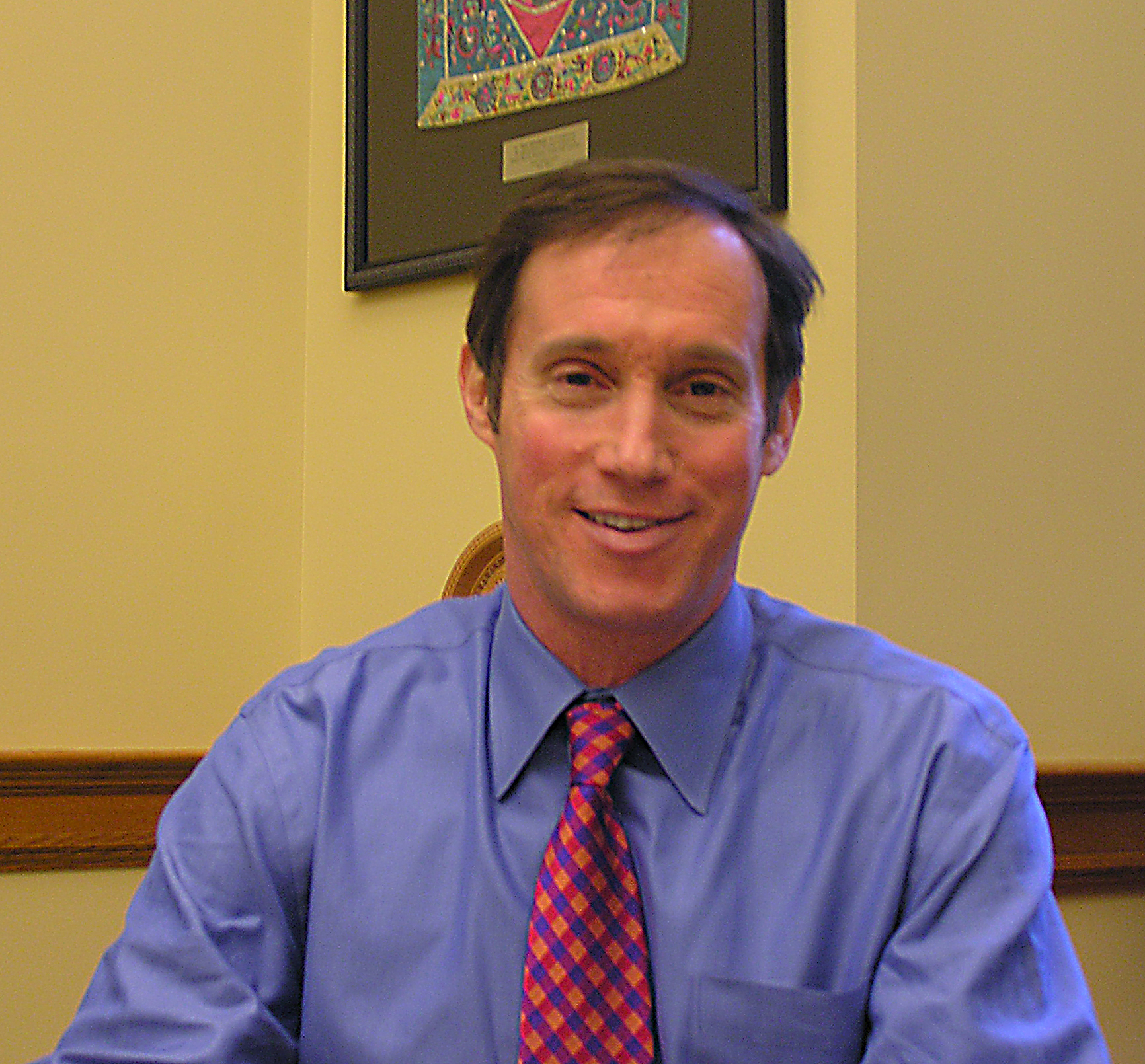
- Saltzman in 2006

Portland City Commissioner
- In office January 1, 1999 – December 31, 2018
- Preceded by: Gretchen Kafoury
- Succeeded by: Jo Ann Hardesty
- Constituency: Portland, Oregon

Multnomah County Commissioner
- In office 1993–1998
- Constituency: Multnomah County, Oregon

Personal details
- Born: 1953 or 1954 (age 71–72) Portland, Oregon
- Education: Cornell University

Dan Saltzman (born 1953/54) is a politician in the U.S. state of Oregon who served as a commissioner (city councilman) on the City Council of Portland in Portland, Oregon, from 1999 through the end of 2018. He was the second longest serving commissioner in Portland history, after William A. Bowes.

== Background ==
Saltzman is a Portland native who attended schools in the Portland area and on the East Coast before entering a career in environmental engineering. He graduated from Beaverton High School, received a B.S. from Cornell University's School of Civil and Environmental Engineering, and an M.S. from the Massachusetts Institute of Technology. His political career has included a staff position with US Senator Ron Wyden, five years as a Multnomah County Commissioner (1993–98), and five terms as a City of Portland Commissioner.

Saltzman was first elected to Portland’s City Council in November 1998, defeating former Multnomah County Commission colleague Tanya Collier, and was sworn in on January 4, 1999. He won on a platform that included domestic violence and child abuse, issues that were generally in the purview of the Multnomah County Commission. According to The Oregonian, he did not offer many specifics about his approach to these issues during his campaign. Saltzman, previously an environmental engineering consultant, was initially assigned the following bureaus by then-Mayor Vera Katz: the Bureau of Emergency Communications (BOEC), the Office of Neighborhood Involvement (ONI), and the Bureau of Environmental Services (BES).

Saltzman has established two bureaus during his service with the City of Portland: the Office of Sustainable Development in 2000 and the Children’s Investment Fund in 2002. The Children's Investment Fund was renamed the Portland Children's Levy in 2009.

As assigned to him by Katz's successor as mayor, Sam Adams, Saltzman oversaw the following City of Portland bureaus, funds and systems: the Bureau of Environmental Services (BES), the Portland Children's Levy, the Gateway Center for Domestic Violence, and the Fire & Police Disability & Retirement (FPDR) system.

From January 2009 until early 2010, Saltzman oversaw the Portland Police Bureau as well, until a high-profile dispute with the mayor's office over proposed cuts to the police budget. On May 12, 2010, a week before Portland voters would decide whether or not to re-elect Saltzman for a fourth term, Adams reassigned the Police Bureau back to the mayor's office and simultaneously fired Chief Rosie Sizer, installing East Precinct Commander Mike Reese as the new Chief of Police. On May 18, 2010, Saltzman was re-elected for a fourth term as City Commissioner.

In June 2013, a shuffling of bureaus among the commissioners by Mayor Charlie Hales saw Saltzman assigned the Portland Fire Bureau and the Housing Bureau, and retaining oversight of the Portland Children's Levy.

In May 2014, Saltzman was re-elected, to serve a fifth four-year term beginning in January 2015.

In September 2017, he announced that he would not run for re-election when his term expired, in 2018. He was replaced by Jo Ann Hardesty.

In 2019, Saltzman was appointed to the Portland Community College Board of Directors for zone 5, which covers parts of southwest Portland, Beaverton, and Bethany. He was elected to a full term in May 2021.
