= Nick Fish =

American politician and lawyer (1958–2020)

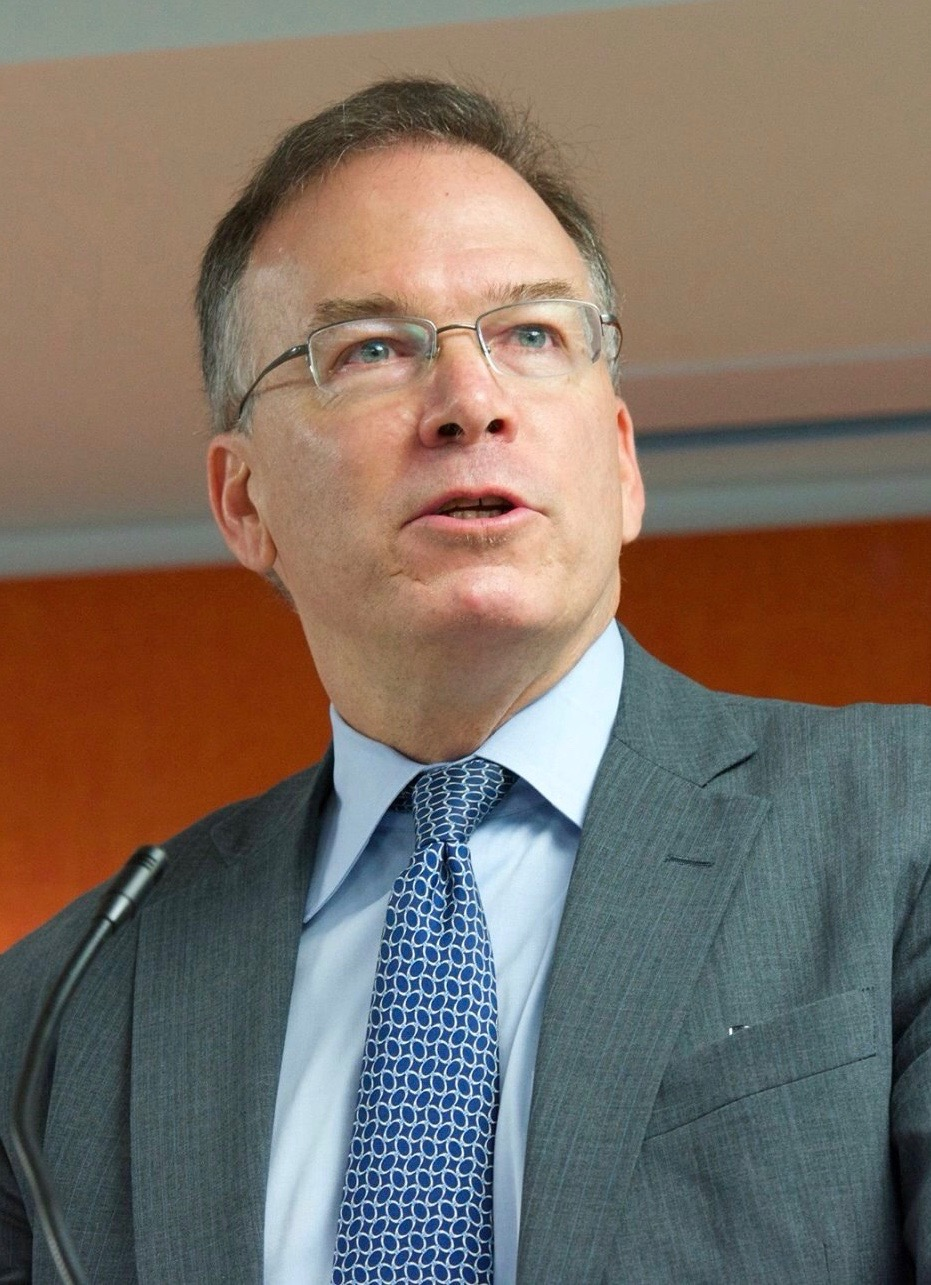
- Fish in 2014

Portland City Commissioner
- In office 2008 – January 2, 2020
- Preceded by: Erik Sten
- Succeeded by: Dan Ryan

Personal details
- Born: Nicholas Stuyvesant Fish; September 30, 1958 Millbrook, New York, U.S.
- Died: January 2, 2020 (aged 61) Portland, Oregon, U.S.
- Party: Democratic
- Relatives: Fish family
- Education: Harvard University (BA); Northeastern University (JD)

Nicholas Stuyvesant Fish (September 30, 1958 – January 2, 2020) was an American politician and lawyer who served as a Commissioner of Portland, Oregon from 2008 to 2020. A Democrat, Fish worked with Portland Parks & Recreation, the Portland Housing Bureau, and the Bureau of Environmental Services.

== Early life ==
Fish was born and raised in Millbrook, New York. He is a member of the prominent Fish political family. He was the son of Julia MacKenzie and Hamilton Fish IV, who represented New York in the United States House of Representatives from 1969 to 1995. His grandfather, Hamilton Fish III, represented New York in the United States House of Representatives from 1920 to 1945 and served in 369th U.S. Infantry Regiment known as the "Harlem Hellfighters." Fish's great-great grandfather was Hamilton Fish, the 26th United States Secretary of State.

== Career ==
After graduating from Harvard University in 1981, Fish worked as a legislative aide for Massachusetts Congressman Barney Frank. He received a Juris Doctor degree from Northeastern University in 1986. Fish practiced law in New York City and in Portland, Oregon.

Fish spent ten years representing health care workers and unions in New York City. He was appointed to Manhattan Community Board Five, a neighborhood association, serving as chair for two years.

Fish championed the renovation of the Times Square Hotel. Working with community non-profit Common Ground, the hotel was remodeled into affordable housing and a thriving community of theater district workers, residents living with HIV/AIDS, and formerly homeless individuals. The Times Square renovation received the Rudy Bruner Award for Urban Excellence in 1997.

Fish moved to Portland, Oregon in 1996 after his wife, Patricia Schechter, was offered a teaching position in the History Department at Portland State University.

Prior to running for elected office, Fish practiced employment law in Oregon, and hosted Outlook Portland with Nick Fish, a public affairs show on KRCW.

Fish served on the boards of Home Forward (formerly the Housing Authority of Portland), the Oregon Cultural Trust, Volunteers of America, and the St. Mark's Historic Landmark Fund.

=== Politics ===
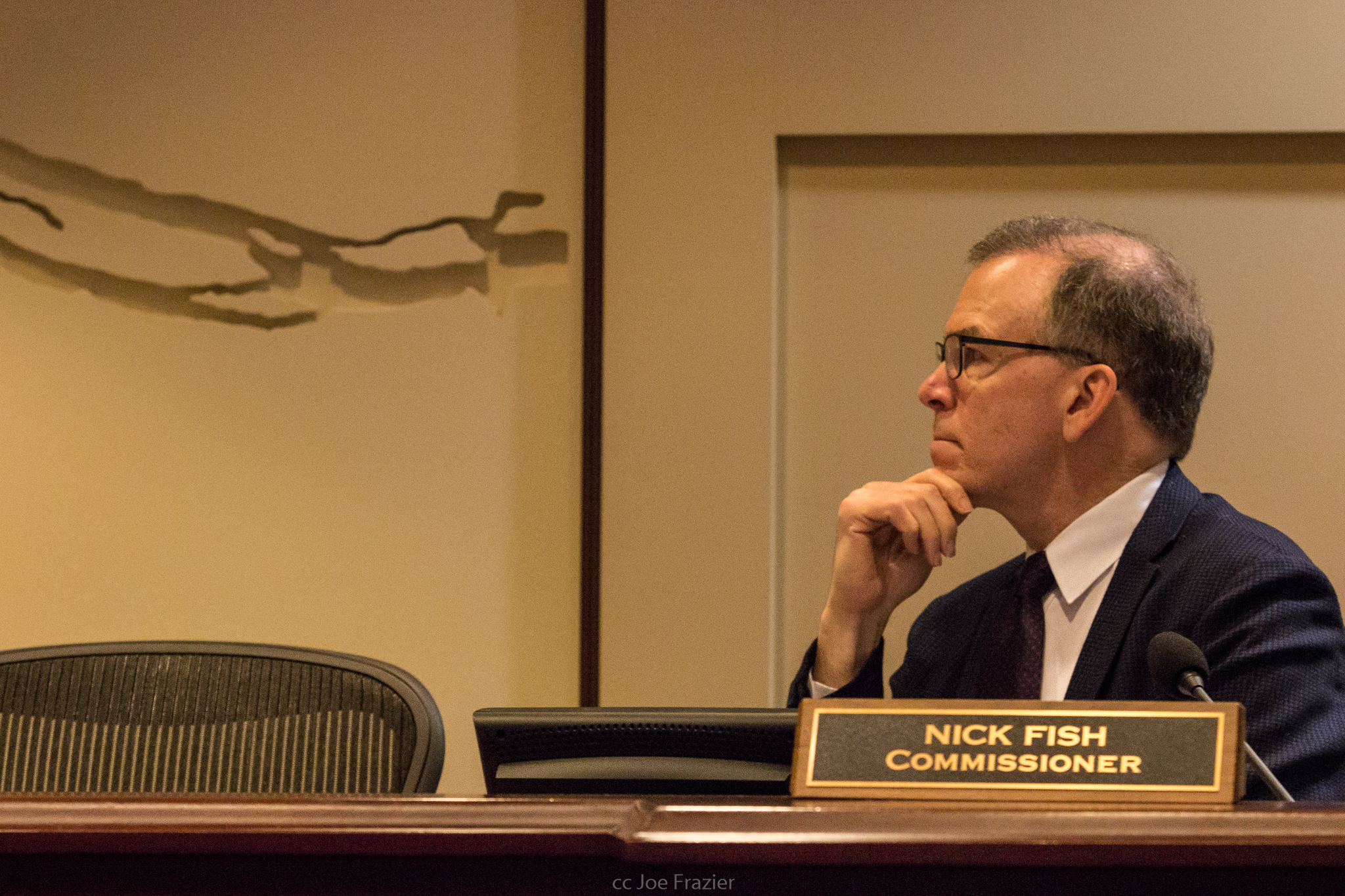
Fish at a meeting of the City Commission

Fish first ran for a seat on the Portland City Council in 2002, losing to Randy Leonard. He ran again in 2004, losing to future Mayor Sam Adams. In 2008, Fish again ran for the Council, this time in a special election for the unexpired term of resigned Commissioner Erik Sten. He won the seat with 61.4% of the vote. He was re-elected to a full four-year term in 2010 with just under 80% of the vote.

Until February 2013, Fish served as Commissioner-in-Charge of the Portland Housing Bureau and Portland Parks & Recreation.

In 2010, Fish led the creation of the new Portland Housing Bureau, streamlining and consolidating the City's housing programs and services. In 2011, he celebrated the opening of Bud Clark Commons, a cornerstone of the City's 10 Year Plan to End Homelessness.

In June 2013, a shuffling of bureaus among the commissioners by Mayor Hales saw Fish assigned the Bureau of Environment Services and the Portland Water Bureau, and placed in charge of the Regional Arts & Culture Council.

== Personal life ==
Fish and his wife lived for 20 years in Northeast Portland before renting an apartment in Goose Hollow towards the end of Nick's life.

Fish was diagnosed with stomach cancer in 2017. On December 31, 2019, Fish said he was no longer able to carry out his work as a commissioner and announced his plan to resign upon the election of a successor. Two days later, Fish died at his home in Portland, Oregon from stomach cancer. He was 61 years old.
