= Timeline of Portland, Oregon =

The following is a timeline of the history of the city of Portland, Oregon, United States.

== 19th century ==
- 1845 – Portland, named after Portland, Maine, was founded by two real-estate men from New England.
- 1850 – The Oregonian newspaper founded.
- 1851
  - Portland incorporated.
  - Hugh O'Bryant becomes mayor.
  - City's first general merchandise store opens, becoming Olds & King in 1878.
  - Portland Public Schools is founded.
- 1855 – Lone Fir Cemetery established.
- 1857 – Aaron Meier's mercantile store, predecessor of Meier & Frank, in business.
- 1860 – Portland Gas Light Company in operation.
- 1864 – Library Association of Portland founded.
- 1866 – Oregon Herald newspaper begins publication.
- 1868 – Population: 6,717.
- 1869 – Lincoln High School opened as Portland High School.
- 1871 – City Park established.
- 1872 – Portland Street Railway horsecars begin operating.
- 1873 - Fire.
- 1875 – Good Samaritan Hospital founded.
- 1876 – University of Oregon established.
- 1880
  - Willamette University College of Medicine relocates to Portland.
  - Portland Chamber of Commerce founded.
- 1881 – Unsightly beggar ordinance effected.
- 1882 – River View Cemetery established.
- 1883
  - Northern Pacific Railway begins operating.
  - Population: 20,000 (approx).
- 1885 – Web-Foot Cook Book published.
- 1886 – Oregon Staats Zeitung newspaper begins publication.
- 1887 – First Morrison Bridge, the first bridge across the Willamette River in Portland (and predecessor of the current Morrison Bridge), opens.
- 1888 – Portland Zoo established.
- 1890
  - Portland Hotel in business.
  - Population: 46,385.
- 1891
  - The first Madison Street Bridge (predecessor of the Hawthorne Bridge) opens
  - Albina and East Portland become part of city.
  - Multnomah Athletic Club founded

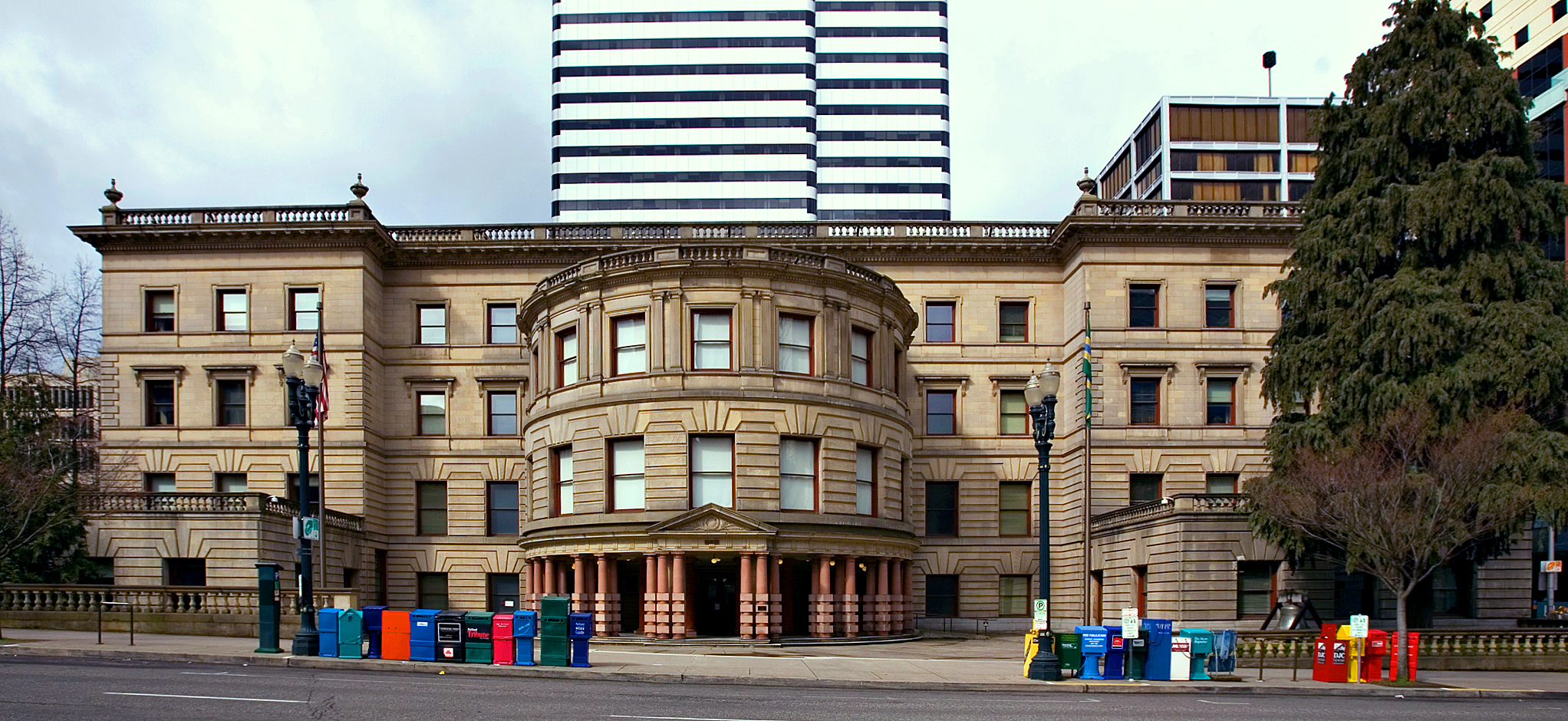
Portland City Hall

- 1892 – Portland Art Museum established.
- 1893
  - Portland annexes Sellwood
  - Nov. 1: A streetcar plunges into the Willamette River from the Madison Street Bridge, the worst streetcar accident in the city's history
- 1895 – City Hall built.
- 1896 – Union Station opens.
- 1898 – Oregon Historical Society established.
- 1900
  - Quarterly of the Oregon Historical Society begins publication.
  - Population: 90,426.

== 20th century ==
=== 1900s–1940s ===
- 1901 – Columbia University and Hill Military Academy established.
- 1903 – Olmsted Portland park plan created.
- 1905 – June 1: Lewis and Clark Centennial Exposition opens.
- 1906 – Trinity Episcopal Cathedral consecrated.
- 1907
  - Portland Rose Festival begins.
  - Portland Mill Strike of 1907 begins in March by lumber mill workers organized by the Industrial Workers of the World. The strike inspired unionization campaigns of bakers and sewer workers in Portland but had been called off by the end of April without winning its demands.
- 1908 – Reed College founded.

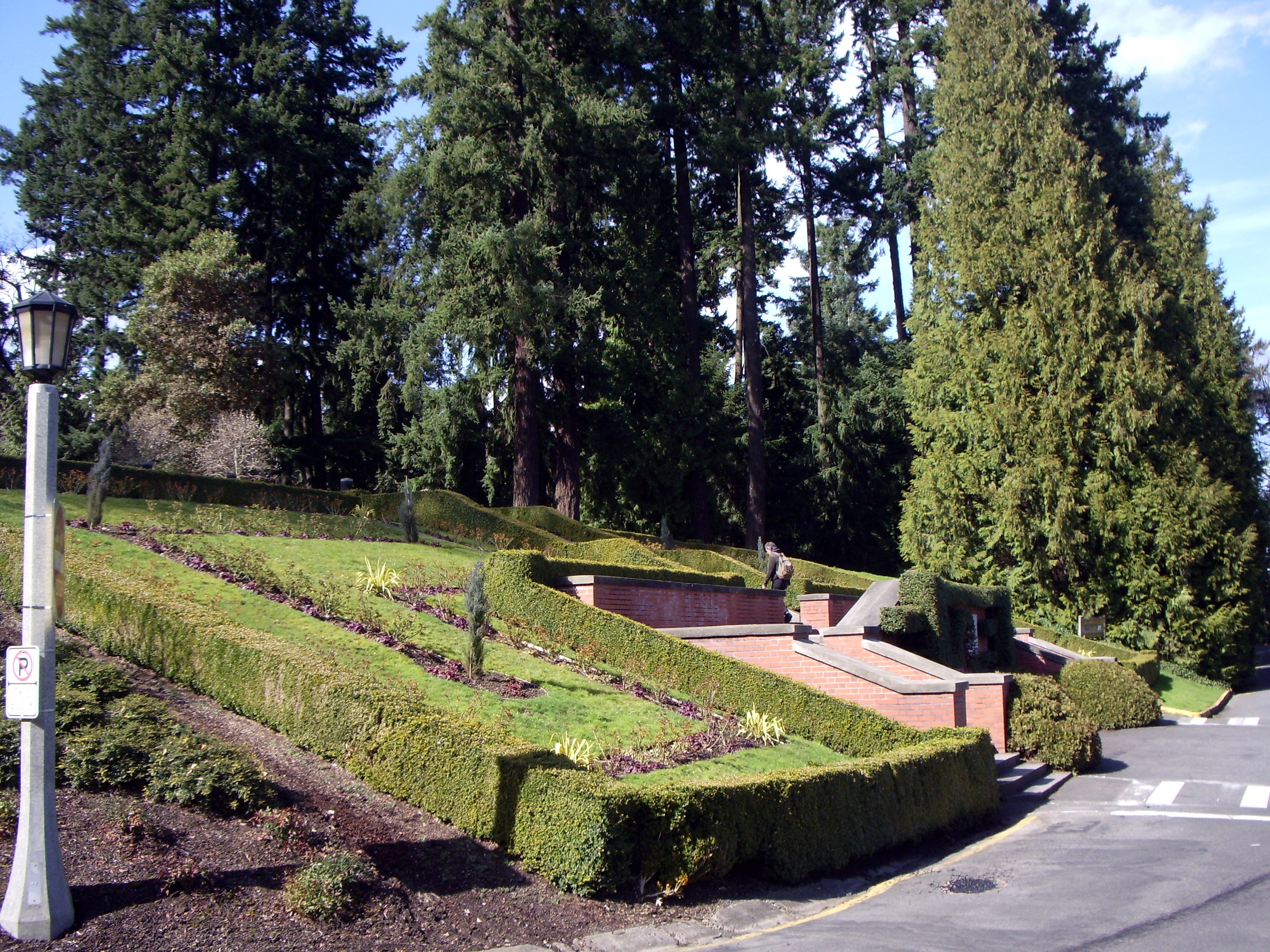
Washington Park main entrance

- 1909
  - Audubon Society founded
  - Museum Art School founded.
  - Washington Park created.
- 1910
  - Hawthorne Bridge opens.
  - Population: 207,214.
- 1912 – Steel Bridge and Globe Theatre open.
- 1913 – Broadway Bridge and Central Library building open.
- 1915 – Linnton and St. Johns become part of city.
- 1916
  - City Club of Portland established.
  - Flatiron Building constructed.
- 1917
  - Interstate Bridge opens.
  - Rose Test Garden established.
  - Portland Public Auditorium opens.
- 1918- Portland is quarantined for a month, because of the Spanish Flu epidemic.
- 1919 – Louis' Oyster Bar in business.
- 1920 – Population: 258,288.
- 1920s – Pacific International Livestock Exposition facility built.
- 1921
  - Blue Mouse Theatre in business.
  - St. Johns Water Tower built, at 7020 N. Oswego Ave.
- 1922
  - Hoyt Arboretum founded.
  - KGW radio begins broadcasting.
- 1924
  - Portland Junior Symphony established.
  - Founding of The Grotto (National Sanctuary of our Sorrowful Mother)
- 1925 – Sellwood Bridge opens.
- 1926
  - Second (and current) Burnside Bridge opens.
  - Ross Island Bridge opens.
  - Hollywood Theatre and Temple Beth Israel built.
- 1927 – Terminal Sales Building constructed.
- 1928 – Portland Publix Theater and Geller's Theatre open.
- 1930 – Swan Island Airport built.
- 1932 – Portland Art Museum building opens.
- 1936 - Portland International Airport opened.
- 1938 – Lewis & Clark College active.
- 1944 – Oregon Museum of Science and Industry established.
- 1945 – Urban League branch and Portland Symphonic Choir founded.
- 1946 – Vanport Extension Center (college) and Portland Children's Museum established.
- 1948
  - May 30: Flood destroys the community of Vanport.
  - Forest Park established.

=== 1950s–1990s ===
- 1950 – Last city streetcar lines (of the pre-MAX and Portland Streetcar era) cease operation.
- 1951 – The Portland Hotel closes and is torn down.
- 1952 – KPTV, a UHF station initially, inaugurates television broadcasting in Portland (and Oregon).
- 1953 – KOIN-TV, city's first VHF television station, begins broadcasting.
- 1955 – Portland State College established.
- 1956
  - Rose City Transit established, taking over mass transit service in Portland.
  - KGW begins its television broadcasting.
  - National College of Naturopathic Medicine established.
- 1957 – Metropolitan Service District (regional governmental agency) established.
- 1958
  - Portland Development Commission formed.
  - Last interurban streetcar lines (until MAX), to Oregon City and Bellrose, cease operating.
  - Portland Zoo Railway begins operating.
  - Third (and current) Morrison Bridge opens.
- 1959
  - Oregon Centennial Exposition and International Trade Fair held.
  - Sister city relationship established with Sapporo, Japan.
  - Portland Zoo (now Oregon Zoo) moves to its current site in Washington Park.
- 1960
  - Veterans Memorial Coliseum and Lloyd Center open.
  - Population: 372,676; metro 881,961.
- 1961 – Portland Community College established.
- 1962
  - March 15: KATU television begins broadcasting.
  - April 14: Packy is born at the Portland Zoo, the first elephant born in the Western Hemisphere in 44 years.
  - October 12: Windstorm, widely known as the Columbus Day Storm.
  - Cinema 21 in business.
- 1964 – Christmas flood of 1964
- 1965 – Pittock Mansion (house museum) opens.
- 1967 – Portland Japanese Garden opens.
- 1968 – KJIB and KBOO radio begin broadcasting.
- 1969 – Tri-Met (Tri-County Metropolitan Transportation District of Oregon) established, replacing Rose City Transit.
- 1970
  - People's Food Co-op founded.
  - Portland Trail Blazers of the NBA founded.
- 1971
  - Powell's Books in business.
  - Northwest Film Study Center established.
  - World Forestry Center opens.
- 1972
  - April 15: 1972 Portland–Vancouver tornado.
  - First National Bank Tower built.
  - Food Front Cooperative Grocery organized.
- 1973
  - January 2: Neil Goldschmidt becomes mayor.
  - November 15: Fremont Bridge opens.
- 1974
  - Oregon Health & Science University established.
  - Willamette Week newspaper begins publication.
- 1975 – Blue Sky Gallery founded.
- 1977 – Portland Transit Mall and Adventist Medical Center building open.
- 1978 – Waterfront Park opens.
- 1979 – Save the Refugees Fund (now Mercy Corps) headquartered in city.
- 1980 – Frank Ivancie becomes mayor.
- 1982
  - Oregon Food Bank active.
  - The Portland Building is constructed.
  - Wieden & Kennedy in business.
- 1983
  - U.S. Bancorp Tower built.
  - Sister city relationship established with Guadalajara, Mexico.
- 1984
  - Pioneer Courthouse Square opens.
  - KOIN Center built.
  - KKCW radio begins broadcasting.
- 1985 – Bud Clark becomes mayor.
- 1986 – MAX Light Rail begins operating.
- 1987
  - Oregon Vietnam Veterans Memorial opens.
  - Sister city relationships established with Ashkelon, Israel; and Ulsan, South Korea.
- 1988
  - Oregon Brewers Festival and Waterfront Blues Festival begin.
  - Sister city relationships established with Kaohsiung, Taiwan; Khabarovsk, USSR; and Suzhou, China.
- 1989 – Oregon Ballet Theatre formed.
- 1990
  - Bicycle Transportation Alliance organized.
  - Population: city 437,319; metro 1,523,741.
- 1991 – Sister city relationship established with Mutare, Zimbabwe.
- 1992 – First Portland Farmers Market
- 1993 – Vera Katz becomes mayor.
- 1994 – Reading Frenzy and Higgins Restaurant in business.
- 1995 – Rose Garden Arena (now Moda Center) opens.
- 1996
  - January–February: Willamette Valley Flood of 1996.
  - City website online (approximate date).
  - Earl Blumenauer becomes Oregon's 3rd congressional district representative.
  - Portland Institute for Contemporary Art founded.
- 1998
  - The 60-year-old Rodgers variety store chain closes its last three stores.
  - Street Roots begins publication.
- 1999
  - Stumptown Coffee in business.
  - Urban Greenspaces Institute founded.
- 2000
  - Portland Classical Chinese Garden opens.
  - The Portland Mercury newspaper begins publication.
  - Red and Black Cafe founded.
  - Hip Mama relocates from Oakland, California to Portland.
  - Dignity Village founded

== 21st century ==
- 2001
  - Portland Streetcar begins operating.
  - Portland International Airport terminal built.
  - Portland Tribune newspaper begins publication.
  - Eastbank Esplanade dedicated.
  - Portland Indymedia active (approximate date).
- 2002
  - Flag of Portland, Oregon design adopted.
  - Willamette Industries taken over by Weyerhaeuser.
  - Pear homeless youth nonprofit founded.
- 2003
  - Time-Based Art Festival begins.
  - Voodoo Doughnut and Park Kitchen in business.
  - Sister city relationship established with Bologna, Italy.
- 2004 – Rose Garden arena bankruptcy.
- 2005
  - Tom Potter becomes mayor.
  - Velveteria: The Museum of Velvet Paintings established.
- 2006
  - Portland Aerial Tram begins operating.
  - The Meier & Frank chain is succeeded by Macy's.
- 2007
  - WatershedPDX founded.
  - Ace Hotel in business.
- 2008
  - December: Snowstorm brings Portland's heaviest snowfall in 40 years.
  - Bunk Sandwiches in business.
- 2009
  - Sam Adams becomes mayor.
  - July: 2009 Pacific Northwest heat wave.
  - BrainSilo founded.
- 2010 – Population: city 583,776; metro 2,226,009.
- 2011
  - October 6: Occupy Portland begins.
  - Street Books begins operating.
  - Fictional Portlandia (TV series) begins national broadcast.
- 2012
  - Suzanne Bonamici becomes Oregon's 1st congressional district representative.
  - Portland befriends the city of Utrecht, Netherlands.
  - September 22: Oregon Rail Heritage Center museum opens.
- 2013 – Charlie Hales becomes mayor.
- 2015
  - September 12: Tilikum Crossing, Portland's first new Willamette River bridge since 1973, opens to the public.
  - December: Rain storm.
- 2016
  - February 29: New Sellwood Bridge opens, replacing 1925 bridge.
  - July 19: Biketown bicycle-sharing program is established.
- 2017 – Ted Wheeler becomes mayor.
- 2020
  - Beginning in March: During the week on March 16, 2020, in response to the COVID-19 pandemic in the United States across Oregon, 3 counties in Portland area issued directives for residents to shelter-in-place from March 23 until at least April 7.
  - May 29: George Floyd protests in Portland begins.
  - September–December: Red House eviction defense
- 2021 - June–July: 2021 Western North America heat wave
- 2025
  - January 1: The government of Portland is changed from a city commission form to a mayor–council type, and the Portland City Council is expanded to 12 members from five.
  - January 1: Keith Wilson becomes mayor.

== See also ==
- History of Portland, Oregon
- List of mayors of Portland, Oregon
- National Register of Historic Places listings in Portland, Oregon

== Bibliography ==
=== Published in the 19th century ===
- G. Owens, ed. (1866), "Portland, Oregon", General directory and business guide of the principal towns in the upper country, San Francisco: A. Gensoul
- John Mortimer Murphy, ed. (1873), "Multnomah County: Portland", Oregon business directory and state gazetteer, S.J. McCormick
- William Reid (1879), Progress of Oregon and Portland from 1868 to 1878, Portland, Or: D.H. Stearns & Co., OL 25160344M
- Harvey Whitefield Scott (1890), History of Portland, Oregon, Syracuse, N.Y: D. Mason & Co., OL 23304856M

=== Published in the 20th century ===
==== 1900s–1960s ====
- "Portland (Oregon)" . Encyclopædia Britannica. Vol. 22 (11th ed.). 1910. p. 120.
- Portland, Oregon, its history and builders, Chicago: S.J. Clarke Pub. Co., 1911, OCLC 1183569, OL 6568578M
  - v.2, v.3
- Sayer, James J. "Our City Councils. II. Portland—the Commission Plan." National Municipal Review 13 (1924): 502-7.
- Ruby Fay Purdy (1947), Rose City of the World: Portland, Oregon, Portland, Oregon: Binfords & Mort, OCLC 2534603, OL 6511508M
- Federal Writers' Project (1951). "Portland". Oregon: End of the Trail. American Guide Series. Portland: Binfords & Mort. hdl:2027/mdp.39015010544792.
- Maddux, Percy. City on the Willamette: The Story of Portland, Oregon. Portland: Binford & Mort, 1952.
- Polk's Portland City Directory, Seattle: R.L. Polk & Company, 1957, OL 22890124M
  - 1959 ed.
  - 1962 ed.

==== 1970s–1990s ====
- Paul G. Meriam. "Urban Elite in the Far West, Portland, Oregon, 1870–1890." Arizona and the West 18 (1976): 41-52.
- Gould, Charles F. "Portland Italians, 1880–1920." Oregon Historical Quarterly 77 (1976): 239-60.
- MacColl, E. Kimbark (1976). The Shaping of a City: Business and Politics in Portland, Oregon 1885 to 1915. Portland, Oregon: Georgian Press. OCLC 2645815.
- MacColl, E. Kimbark (1979). The Growth of a City: Power and Politics in Portland, Oregon 1915 to 1950. Portland, Oregon: Georgian Press. ISBN 0-9603408-1-5.
- Paul G. Meriam. "The ‘Other Portland’: A Statistical Note on the Foreign-born, 1860–1910." Oregon Historical Quarterly 80 (1979): 258-68.
- Toll, William. The Making of an Ethnic Middle Class: Portland Jewry over Four Generations. Albany: State University of New York Press, 1982.
- Carl Abbott. Portland: Planning, Politics, and Growth in a Twentieth-Century City. Lincoln: University of Nebraska Press, 1983.
- Blackford, Mansell. "The Lost Dream: Businessmen and City Planning in Portland, Oregon, 1903–1914." The Western Historical Quarterly 15 (1984): 39-56.
- William Toll. "Ethnicity and Stability: The Italians and Jews of South Portland, 1900–1940." Pacific Historical Review 54 (1985): 161-90.
- E. Kimbark MacColl. Merchants, Money, and Power: The Portland Establishment, 1843–1913. Portland: Georgian Press, 1988.
- Bigelow, William, and Norman Diamond. "Agitate, Educate, Organize: Portland, 1934." Oregon Historical Quarterly 89 (1988): 5-29.
- Horowitz, David A. "The Crusade against Chain Stores: Portland's Independent Merchants, 1928–1935." Oregon Historical Quarterly 89 (1988): 340-68.
- Dodds, Gordon, and Craig Wollner. The Silicon Forest: High Tech in the Portland Area, 1945–1985. Portland: Oregon Historical Society Press, 1990.
- Wollner, Craig. The City Builders: One Hundred Years of Union Carpentry in Portland, Oregon, 1883–1983. Portland: Oregon Historical Society Press, 1990.
- Carl Abbott. "Regional City and Network City: Portland and Seattle in the Twentieth Century." Western Historical Quarterly 23 (1992): 293-322.
- Harvey, Thomas. "Portland, Oregon: Regional City in a Global Economy." Urban Geography 17 (1996): 95-114.
- William Toll. "Permanent Settlement: Japanese Families in Portland, 1920." Western Historical Quarterly 28 (1997): 19-44.
- William Toll. "Black Families and Migration to a Multiracial Society: Portland, Oregon, 1900–1924." Journal of American Ethnic History 17 (1998): 38-70.
- Barker, Neil. "Portland's Works Progress Administration." Oregon Historical Quarterly 101 (2000): 414-41.

=== Published in the 21st century ===
- Abbott, Carl (2001). Greater Portland: Urban Life and Landscape in the Pacific Northwest. Philadelphia: University of Pennsylvania Press. ISBN 0-8122-1779-9.
- Carl Abbott. "Portland: Civic Culture and Civic Opportunity." Oregon Historical Quarterly 102 (2001): 6-21.
- Pearson, Rudy. "’A Menace to the Neighborhood’: Housing and African Americans in Portland, 1941–1945." Oregon Historical Quarterly 102 (2001): 158-79.
- Rosenthal, Nicholas G. "Repositioning Indianness: Native American Organizations in Portland, Oregon, 1959–1975." Pacific Historical Review 71 (2002): 415-38.
- Lansing, Jewel (2003). Portland: People, Politics, and Power, 1851–2001. Corvallis: Oregon State University Press. ISBN 0-87071-559-3.
- Palahniuk, Chuck (2003). Fugitives and Refugees: A Walk in Portland, Oregon. New York: Crown Journeys. ISBN 1-4000-4783-8.
- Johnston, Robert. The Radical Middle Class: Populist Democracy and the Question of Capitalism in Progressive Era Portland. New Haven: Yale University Press, 2003.
- William Toll, ed. (2003). "Commerce, Climate, & Community: A History of Portland & Its People". Oregon History Project. Oregon Historical Society.
- Thompson, Richard (2006). Portland's Streetcars. Charleston, South Carolina: Arcadia Publishing. ISBN 0-7385-3115-4.
- Wood Wortman, Sharon; Wortman, Ed (2006). The Portland Bridge Book (3rd ed.). Urban Adventure Press. ISBN 0-9787365-1-6.
- Mike Lewyn (2007), Debunking Cato: Why Portland Works Better Than the Analysis of Its Chief Neo-Libertarian Critic, Chicago: Congress for the New Urbanism, archived from the original on February 22, 2014
- Abbott, Carl (2011). Portland in Three Centuries: The Place and the People. Corvallis: Oregon State University Press. ISBN 978-0-87071-613-3.; scholarly history
