= Cycle Oregon =

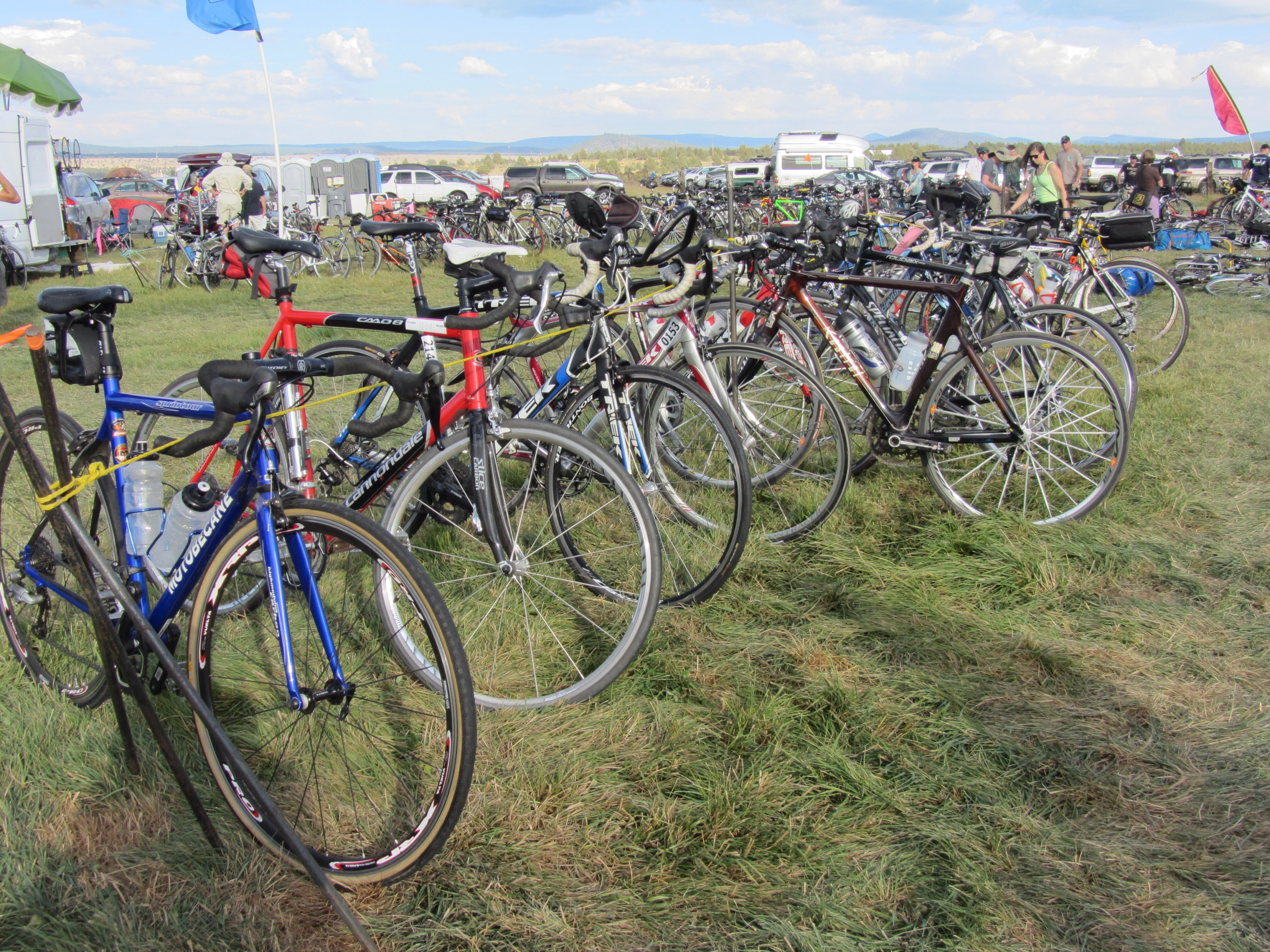
Cycle Oregon 2012

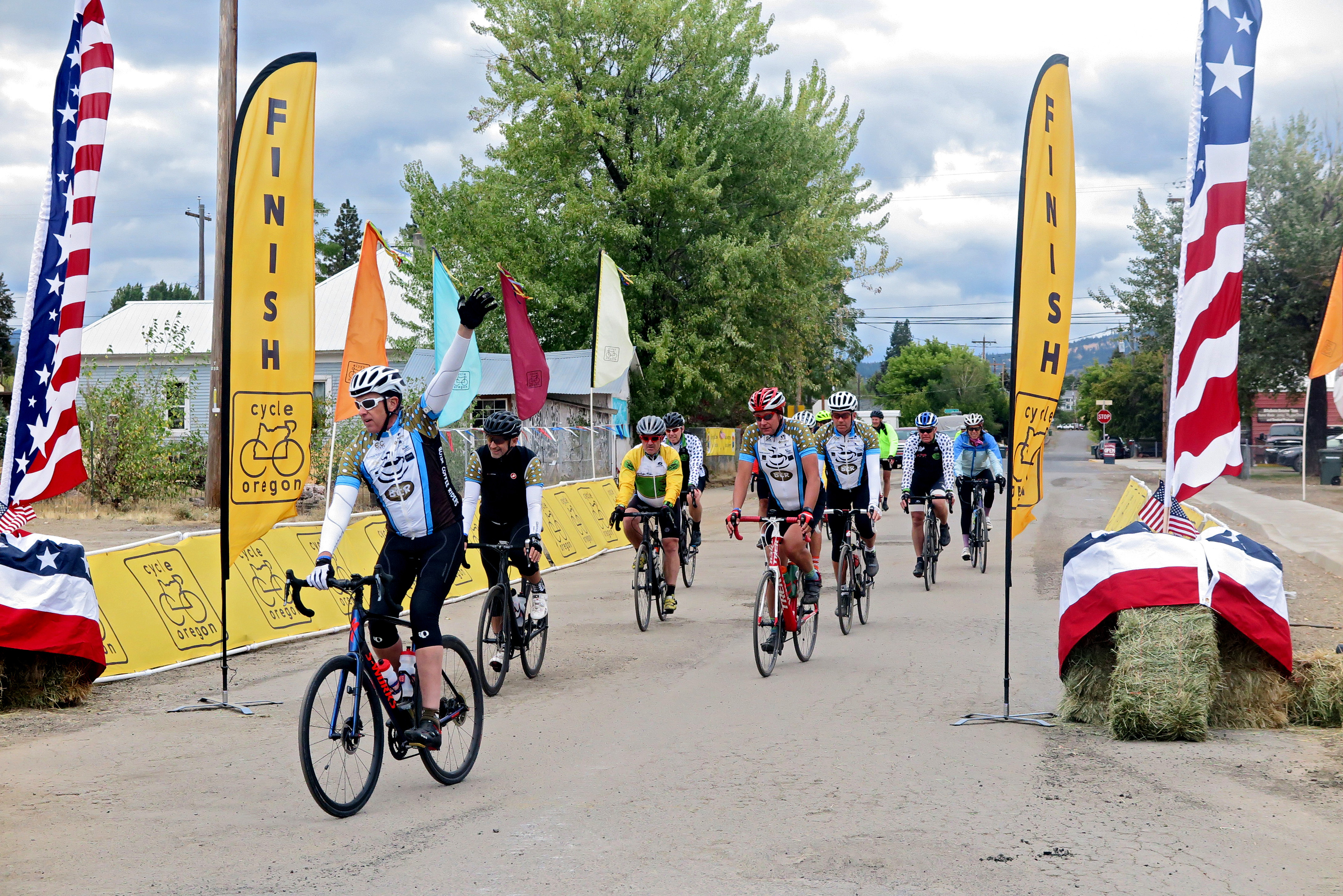
Classic 2018 - Finish line of final day in La Grande, Oregon

Cycle Oregon is a non-profit organization best known for its week-long, non-competitive bike ride, called Classic, held as a fundraiser for the Cycle Oregon Fund. Cycle Oregon additionally hosts GRAVEL, a weekend cycling event, Joyride, a one-day cycling event for women only and WEEKENDER, a weekend cycling event often hosted on a college campus. Cycle Oregon also manages Jumpstart, Oregon's Safe Routes to School program focused on rural communities, and administers the Oregon Scenic Bikeways program.

== History ==
The first Cycle Oregon event took place in September 1988, covering 343 miles between the Oregon cities of Salem and Brookings. More than 1,000 cyclists participated. By 1994, there were more than 2,000 participants participating annually.

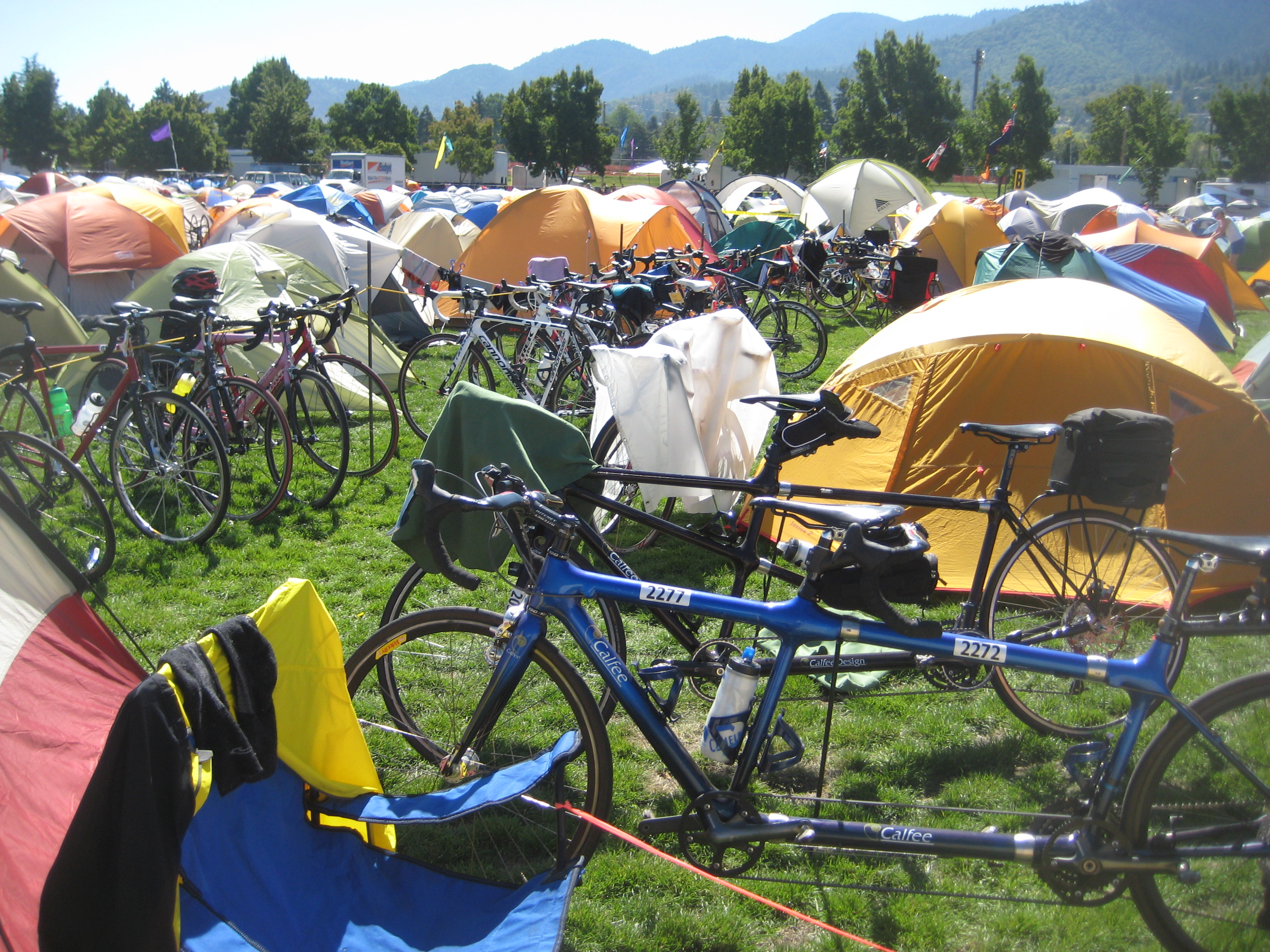
Cycle Oregon Classic camp 2012

=== Cycle Oregon Classic Routes ===
Year	Edition	Route	Distance (Miles)	Elevation (Feet)
1988	I	Salem to Brookings	343	9,429
1989	II	Portland to Ashland	438	21,000
1990	III	Pendleton to Newport	413	22,000
1991	IV	Beaverton to Hood River	540	25,200
1992	V	Eugene to Medford	417	18,500
1993	VI	Baker City to Oregon City	448	24,500
1994	VII	Eugene to Brookings	473	19,700
1995	VIII	Athena to Fossil	435	27,723
1996	IX	Lakeview (Crater Lake Loop)	560	21,900
1997	X	Nyssa to Yachats	526	22,700
1998	XI	Myrtle Creek (Crater Lake Loop)	528	29,885
1999	XII	La Grande (Wallowas Loop)	546	29,666
2000	XIII	Paisley to Hood River	561	21,280
2001	XIV	Prairie City (Frenchglen Loop)	503	16,200
2002	XV	Nyssa to Florence	594	17,975
2003	XVI	Baker City (Hells Canyon Loop)	541	22,788
2004	XVII	Canyonville (Crater Lake Loop)	502	28,749
2005	XVIII	Boardman to Astoria	513	24,738
2006	XIX	Umatilla (Blue Mountains Loop)	508	28,750
2007	XX	Sisters (Cascades Loop)	481	28,463
2008	XXI	Elgin to Wallowa Lake	435	21,521
2009	XXII	Medford to Grants Pass	436	28,202
2010	XXIII	Elgin to Pendleton	481	27,133
2011	XXIV	Sutherlin to Riddle	500	24,865
2012	XXV	Bly to Klamath Falls	506	30,577
2013	XXVI	John Day to Seneca	505	17,685
2014	XXVII	The Dalles to Madras	490	34,893
2015	XXVIII	Baker City to La Grande	450	22,397
2016	XXIX	Tri-City to Gold Beach	484	24,360
2017		Cancelled due to wildfires
2018	XXX	Baker City to La Grande	451	28,797
2019	XXXI	Oakridge to Dorena Lake	486	31,330
2020		Cancelled due to COVID-19
2021		Cancelled due to COVID-19
2022	XXXII	John Day to Mitchell	443	35,245

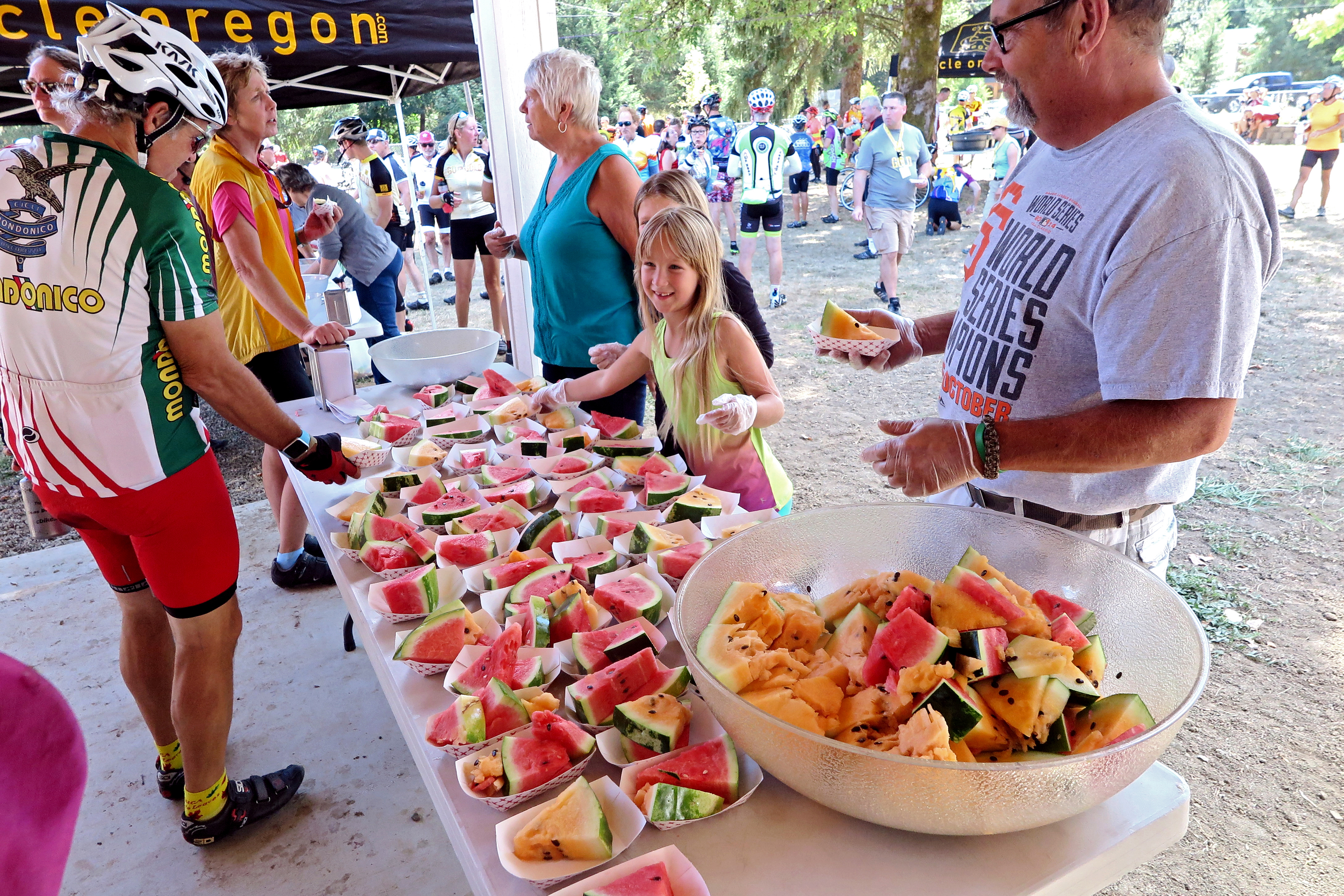
Community volunteers are integral to the operation and fun of the event

== Description ==
Cycle Oregon hosts four non-competitive, recreational cycling events each year to raise money for the Cycle Oregon fund and promote tourism throughout the state. Cycle Oregon events are supported rides; participants are provided with meals, camping facilities, shower and restroom facilities, and sag wagon support on course. Event locations vary each year with routes announced in January at a kickoff party and through a promotional video. The four events are:

Classic - A week-long bicycling journey showcasing some of Oregon's most spectacular vistas usually held in September

WEEKENDER: A two-day bicycling event most commonly held on a college campus with multiple ride options usually held in July

Joyride is a women-only one-day ride offering short, medium and long routes usually held in June

GRAVEL is a two-day mixed-terrain bicycle event with multiple route options usually held in May

== See also ==
- Hawthorne Bridge bicycle counter
