= East Side Railway =

Former railway company in Oregon, United States

Overview
- Dates of operation: 1892–1901
- Successor: Portland City and Oregon Railway

Technical
- Electrification: 600 V DC

The East Side Railway was a railway company in the state of Oregon in the United States. It was established in 1892 to construct an electrified interurban railway line between Portland and Oregon City, on the east side of the Willamette River. This line opened in 1893; the company failed financially and was acquired by the Portland City and Oregon Railway in 1901.

== History ==
The initial backers of the East Side Railway were George A. Steel, a politician and businessman, and his brother James. The two already operated street railways in Portland, Oregon, and sought to expand their interests. The East Side Railway was incorporated on May 12, 1892. The company began by buying out George W. Brown, who had incorporated a company with the same name on May 15, 1891. This East Side Railway would have built to Eugene, Oregon.

Construction toward Oregon City, Oregon, began at once. (Note: Mills and Robertson credit a subsidiary of the East Side Railway, the Oregon City and Southern Railway, with the construction of the line. Thompson and Hilton do not.) The full 14-mile (23 km) line between Portland and Oregon City opened on February 16, 1893. The line was electrified at 600 V DC. Traffic did not develop as projected and the company entered receivership at the end of 1893. Joseph Simon served as receiver; the Steel brothers continued to operate the company.

The Portland City and Oregon Railway acquired the company on February 1, 1901. The East Side's line eventually became part of the Portland Railway, Light and Power Company system. Passenger service on the original Oregon City line ended in 1958. The southern end of the line in Oregon City and Milwaukie, Oregon, is now the Trolley Trail rail trail.

== See also ==
- Madison Street Bridge disaster
- Springwater Corridor
