= Madison Street Bridge (Portland, Oregon) =

Former bridge in Portland, Oregon, U.S.

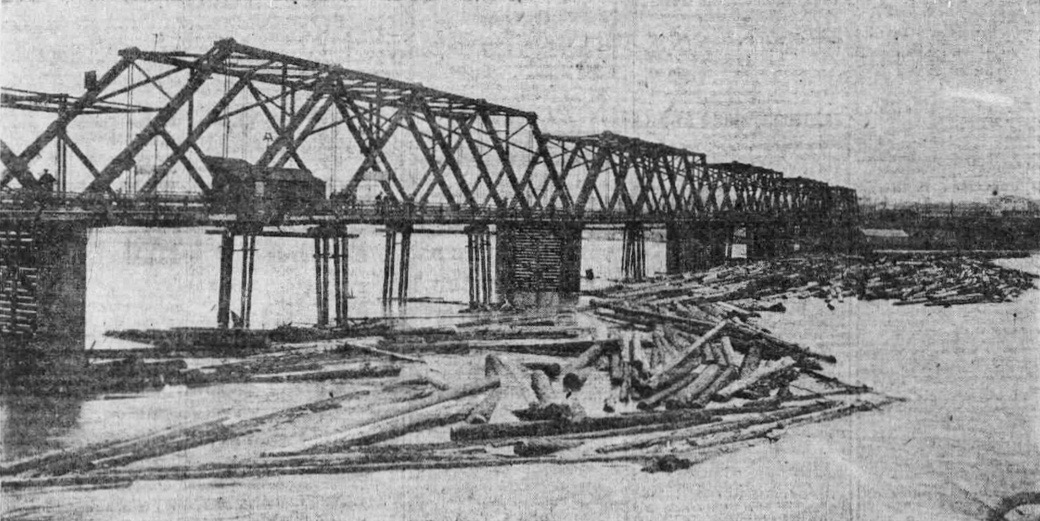
The second bridge in March 1908, when flooding upriver had caused a log jam to accumulate around it. The swing span is out of frame to the left in this view.

The Madison Street Bridge, or Madison Bridge, refers to two different bridges that spanned the Willamette River in Portland, Oregon, from 1891 to 1900 and from 1900 to 1909. The bridges connected Madison Street, on the river's west bank, and Hawthorne Avenue, on the east bank, on approximately the same alignment as the existing Hawthorne Bridge. The original and later bridges are sometimes referred to as Madison Street Bridge No. 1 and Madison Street Bridge No. 2, respectively. The second bridge, built in 1900, has alternatively been referred to as the "rebuilt" Madison Street Bridge (of 1891), rather than as a new bridge, because it was rebuilt on the same piers. Both were swing bridges, whereas their successor, the Hawthorne Bridge, is a vertical-lift-type.

== First bridge ==
Madison Street Bridge (1891)
- Coordinates: 45.513204°N 122.670937°W
- Carries: Streetcars, horse-drawn vehicles, pedestrians and bicycles
- Crosses: Willamette River
- Locale: Portland, Oregon

Characteristics
- Design: Pratt truss with swing span
- Material: Wood
- Total length: 1,470 feet (450 m) (2,262 ft including approaches)
- Width: 40 feet (12 m)
- Longest span: 317 ft (97 m) (swing span)

History
- Opened: January 11, 1891
- Closed: December 1899
- Replaced by: Madison Street Bridge (1900)

Construction of the first bridge, a wooden swing-span bridge, began in February 1890. It was built by the Pacific Bridge Company and owned by the Madison Street Bridge Company. It opened as a toll bridge on January 11, 1891. At that time, the bridge's east end was in the city of East Portland, Oregon. Subsequently, in July of the same year, East Portland merged with its larger neighbor, becoming part of the city of Portland. Later in 1891, the Oregon state legislature organized eight Portland residents into a committee that purchased the bridge on November 18, 1891, for $145,000 (equivalent to $3,825,315 in 2015) and eliminated the tolls. The following year, the committee won approval from the United States Secretary of War for a contract to build the Burnside Bridge nearby.

The bridge's two-lane roadway was 22 feet (6.7 m) wide, and there were 6.5-foot (2 m) sidewalks on both sides, while the structure's overall width was 40 feet (12 m).

The Madison Street Bridge disaster occurred on November 1, 1893, when a westbound streetcar drove off the open draw of the bridge, and seven people died. This event remains the worst streetcar accident to occur in Portland, as well as the worst bridge disaster in the city's history.

In July 1899, the aging bridge was declared unsafe and in urgent need of rebuilding. Work to replace the structure, on the same piers, began in December 1899, with dismantling of the trusses.

== Second bridge ==
Madison Street Bridge (1900)
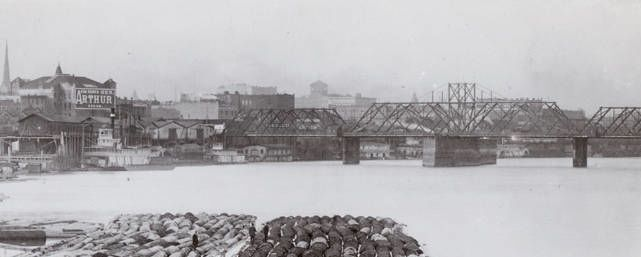
- West end and swing span circa late 1900
- Coordinates: 45.513204°N 122.670937°W
- Crosses: Willamette River
- Locale: Portland, Oregon

Characteristics
- Design: Howe truss with swing span
- Material: Wood
- Total length: 1,456 ft (444 m)
- Longest span: 312 ft (95 m) or 316 ft (96 m) (swing span)
- No. of spans: 7 (6 fixed, 1 movable)

History
- Opened: April 1900
- Closed: January 20, 1909
- Replaced by: Hawthorne Bridge

In 1900, the first bridge was replaced by another wooden swing-span bridge, sometimes referred to as Madison Street Bridge No. 2. It has also been described as a rebuilding of the original bridge, because the work consisted of new truss spans mounted on the same piers. The rebuilt bridge opened to traffic in April 1900, but retaining the original swing-span section from 1891. Because of the estimated high cost, replacement of the swing span had been postponed, with predictions that it might hold on for another year or two. However, in July 1900, it was declared unsafe by the Multnomah County Board of Commissioners, and plans to replace it with a new swing-type draw span were accelerated. The new swing span was constructed in fall 1900, and it was made stronger than its predecessor by an additional tower built over the middle pier, connected to the outer ends of the span by iron or steel rods.

On June 21, 1902, a fire that destroyed six blocks of east-side waterfront property also heavily damaged the bridge's eastern approach viaduct, closing the bridge to all traffic for several weeks. It reopened to pedestrians on July 18, to horse-drawn vehicles on August 5, and subsequently to streetcars. By 1907, planning was under way for the bridge to be replaced by a new structure that would be positioned at a higher elevation over the water and be constructed of steel instead of wood. In June 1907, voters approved a measure to issue $450,000 in municipal bonds to fund construction of a new bridge.

On January 20, 1909, the bridge was closed indefinitely to all traffic, after high river levels had caused debris to accumulate around its piers, placing strain on the structure. The indefinite suspension became a permanent one. Plans for a new, stronger bridge, eventually to be named the Hawthorne Bridge, were firm by this time. The Portland Railway, Light and Power Company, whose streetcars had used the bridge, and many residents of the east side, argued that the old bridge should be reopened while the new one was being built, but it remained closed. Construction contracts for the new Hawthorne Bridge were signed in June 1909. Dismantling of the Madison Street Bridge's structure and demolition of its piers took place in August and September 1909, followed by construction of the replacement bridge, on the same alignment. The Hawthorne Bridge opened on December 19, 1910.

== See also ==
- List of crossings of the Willamette River
- Timeline of Portland, Oregon

== Works cited ==
- Bottenberg, Ray (2007). Bridges of Portland. Arcadia Publishing. ISBN 978-0-7385-4876-0.
- Labbe, John T. (1980). Fares Please! Those Portland Trolley Years. Caldwell, ID: Caxton Printers. ISBN 0-87004-287-4. LCCN 79-50502.
- MacColl, E. Kimbark (1976). The Shaping of a City: Business and Politics in Portland, Oregon, 1885 to 1915. Portland, Oregon: The Georgian Press Company. ISBN 0-89174-043-0.
- Thompson, Richard (2006). Portland's Streetcars. Arcadia Publishing. ISBN 0-7385-3115-4.
- Wood Wortman, Sharon; Wortman, Ed (2006). The Portland Bridge Book (3rd ed.). Urban Adventure Press. ISBN 0-9787365-1-6.
