= Hawthorne Bridge =

Bridge over the Willamette River in Portland, Oregon

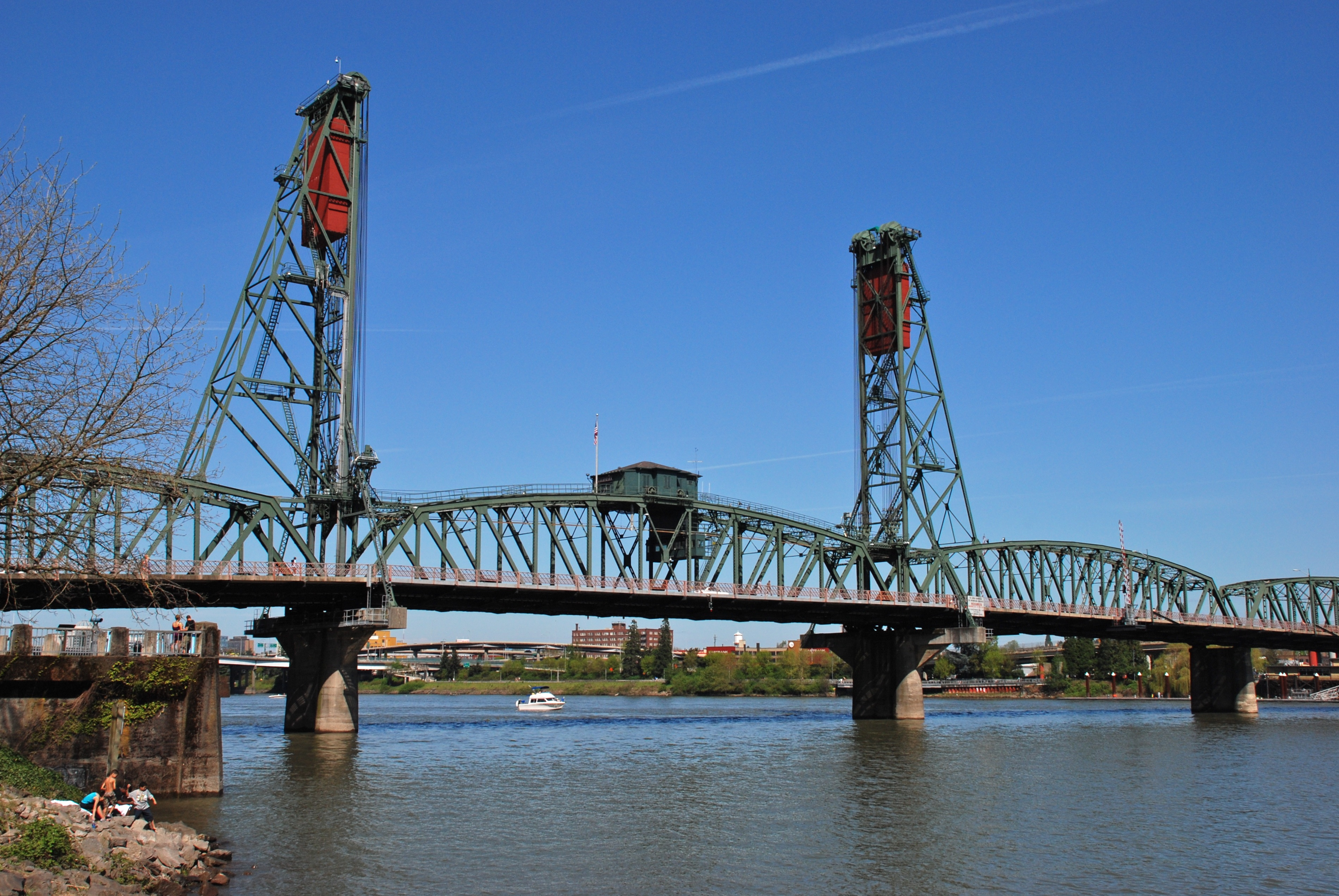
- Coordinates: 45°30′48″N 122°40′16″W
- Carries: Vehicles, pedestrians, cyclists
- Crosses: Willamette River
- Locale: Portland, Oregon
- Maintained by: Multnomah County

Characteristics
- Design: Parker truss with a vertical-lift span
- Material: Steel
- Total length: 1,382 ft (421 m)
- Width: 73 ft (22 m)
- Longest span: 244 ft (74 m)
- No. of spans: 6 (excluding concrete girder approach spans)
- Piers in water: 6
- Clearance below: 49 ft (15 m) closed 159 ft (48 m) open

History
- Designer: Waddell & Harrington
- Opened: December 19, 1910
- Replaces: Madison Street Bridge No. 2

Statistics
- Daily traffic: 30,000
- Hawthorne Bridge
- U.S. National Register of Historic Places
- Portland Historic Landmark
- Location: Portland, Oregon; Willamette River at river mile 13.1
- Coordinates: 45°30′48″N 122°40′16″W
- Built: 1910
- Architect: Waddell & Harrington
- MPS: Willamette River Highway Bridges of Portland, Oregon
- NRHP reference No.: 12000932
- Added to NRHP: November 14, 2012

Location
- Interactive map of Hawthorne Bridge

The Hawthorne Bridge is a truss bridge with a vertical lift that spans the Willamette River in Portland, Oregon, joining Hawthorne Boulevard and Madison Street. It is the oldest vertical-lift bridge in operation in the United States and the oldest highway bridge in Portland. It is also the busiest bicycle bridge in Oregon, with over 8,000 cyclists and 800 TriMet buses (carrying about 17,400 riders) daily. It was added to the National Register of Historic Places in November 2012.

== Statistics ==
The bridge consists of five fixed spans and one 244-foot-long (74 m) vertical-lift span. It is 1,382 feet (421 m) in total length. The bridge was originally 63 feet (19 m) wide, including two five-foot sidewalks, but the sidewalks were widened to 10 feet in 1998, increasing the structure's overall width to 73 feet (22 m). The 880,000-pound (400,000 kg) counterweights are suspended from the two 165-foot-tall (50 m) towers. It is operated by a pair of 150-horsepower motors. On average, the lift span is raised for river traffic 120 times per month. While the river is at low level, the bridge is 49 feet (15 m) above the water, causing it to be raised an average of 200 times per month. As of 2001, the average daily traffic was 30,500 vehicles. The bridge was designed by Waddell & Harrington, which also designed the Steel and Interstate bridges. John Alexander Low Waddell invented the modern-day vertical-lift bridge.

== History ==
The current bridge was built to replace the second Madison Street Bridge, a wooden bridge built in 1900. It cost $511,000 to build and was opened on December 19, 1910. Hawthorne Boulevard (and thus the bridge) was named after Dr. J.C. Hawthorne, the cofounder of Oregon's first mental hospital and early proponent for the first Morrison Bridge.

The streetcar tracks across the bridge were originally in the outer lanes, but were relocated to the center lanes in 1931. The deck was changed from wood to steel grating in 1945.

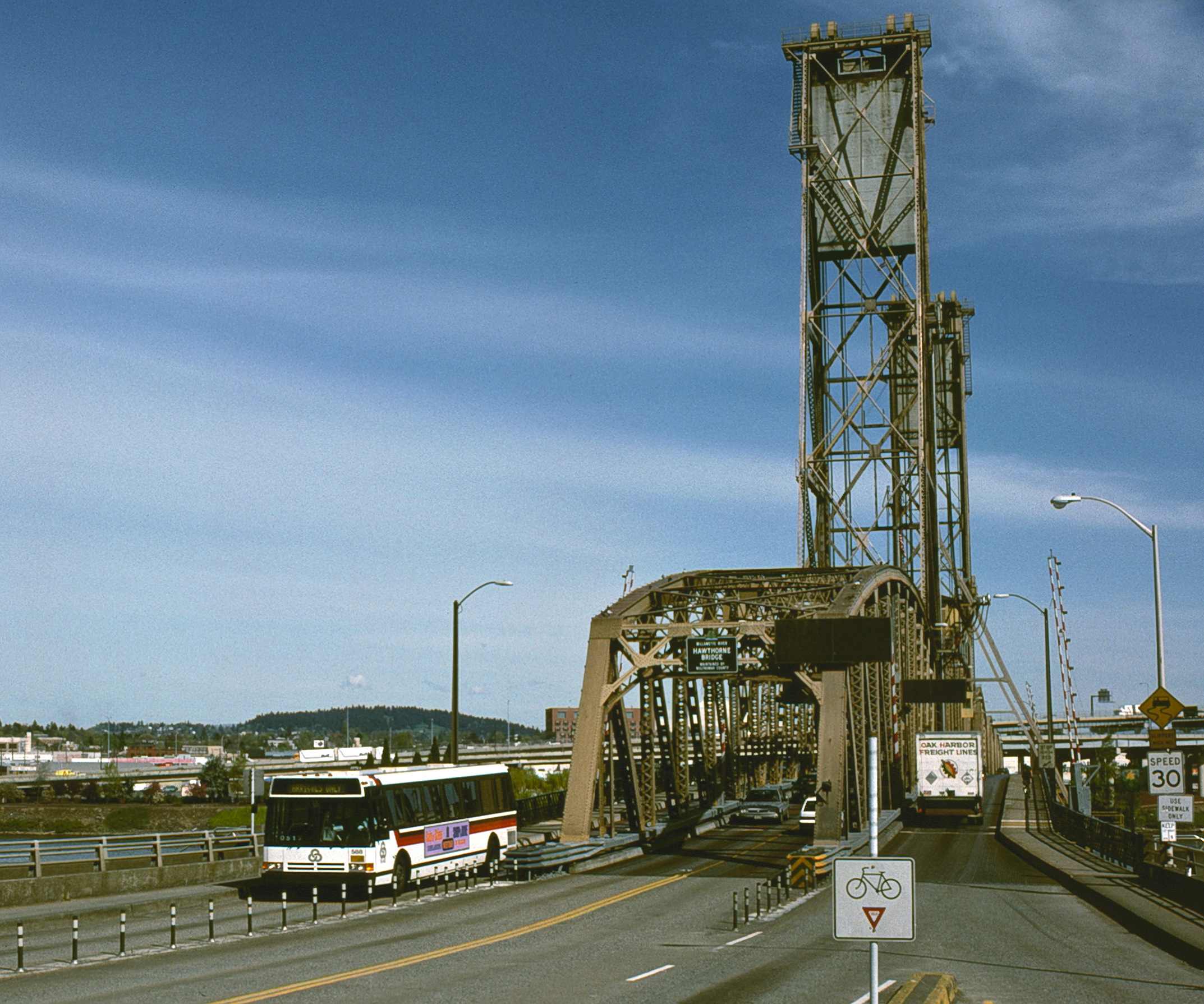
The bridge was yellow-ochre in color from 1964 to 1998. This 1993 photo also shows the original, narrower sidewalks.

In 1985, the lift span sheaves, the grooved wheels that guide the counterweight cables, were replaced. The bridge went through a $21 million renovation from 1998 to 1999, which included replacing the steel grated deck and repainting. The original lead-based paint was completely removed and replaced with 3 layers of new paint that is estimated to last 30 years. During this upgrade, the sidewalks were widened to 10 feet (3.0 m), making it a thoroughfare for bicycle commuters. Due to the replacement of the steel deck during this project, the channels which used to carry the rails for streetcars and interurban trains were also removed. The bridge was closed for one year to permit the renovation to be carried out.

The original color of the bridge was black, lasting until 1964, when it was repainted yellow-gold ochre. During the 1998–99 renovation, the color was changed to green with red trim.

In 2001, the sidewalks were connected to the Eastbank Esplanade. In 2005, the estimated cost to replace the bridge was $189.3 million.

The 2003 film, The Hunted, included a scene set on MAX on the Hawthorne Bridge. Since MAX does not cross the bridge, the movie company connected two articulated buses remodeled to resemble a MAX train, complete with fake overhead lines and a sprinkler system to simulate rain. Light-rail (interurban) service did cross the Hawthorne Bridge until 1956.

The new deck put in place in the outer lanes during the 1998–99 renovation was designed to be strong enough for possible use by modern, heavier streetcars or light rail trains in the future, which was proposed at that time, and TriMet was still considering a Hawthorne Bridge routing for its future MAX Orange Line, to Milwaukie, in 2002. However, following the transit agency's later decision to build the Tilikum Crossing for the Milwaukie MAX line, which bridge could also be used by the Portland Streetcar, it became unlikely that rail cars will ever again cross the Hawthorne Bridge.

The bridge was added to the National Register of Historic Places in November 2012.

=== Bicycle counter ===
In August 2012, an automated real-time bicycle counter was installed on the bridge, the first such counter to be installed in a U.S. city. It was purchased by the non-profit group Cycle Oregon for $20,000 and donated to the city. The city paid $5,000 for its installation. The millionth rider was counted in July 2013. The counter was broken in 2018 and has not been repaired; no data has been recorded since.

== Incidents ==
In May 2011, a gay couple who had been walking across the bridge while holding hands was attacked by a group of five men who had been following them. A demonstration called Hands Across Hawthorne was later held in support of the couple.

In the evening of February 20, 2025, a man climbed the counterweight mechanism in the west tower of the bridge. Traffic was stalled throughout the night for 16 hours while local authorities attempted to contact the man, until he later climbed down the next morning.

== Gallery ==
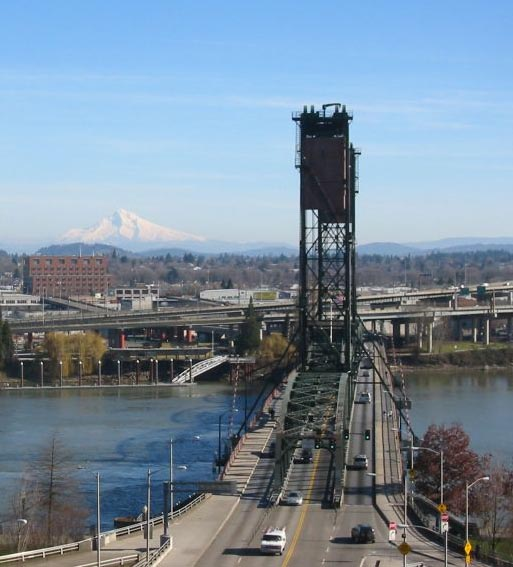
Seen from the west

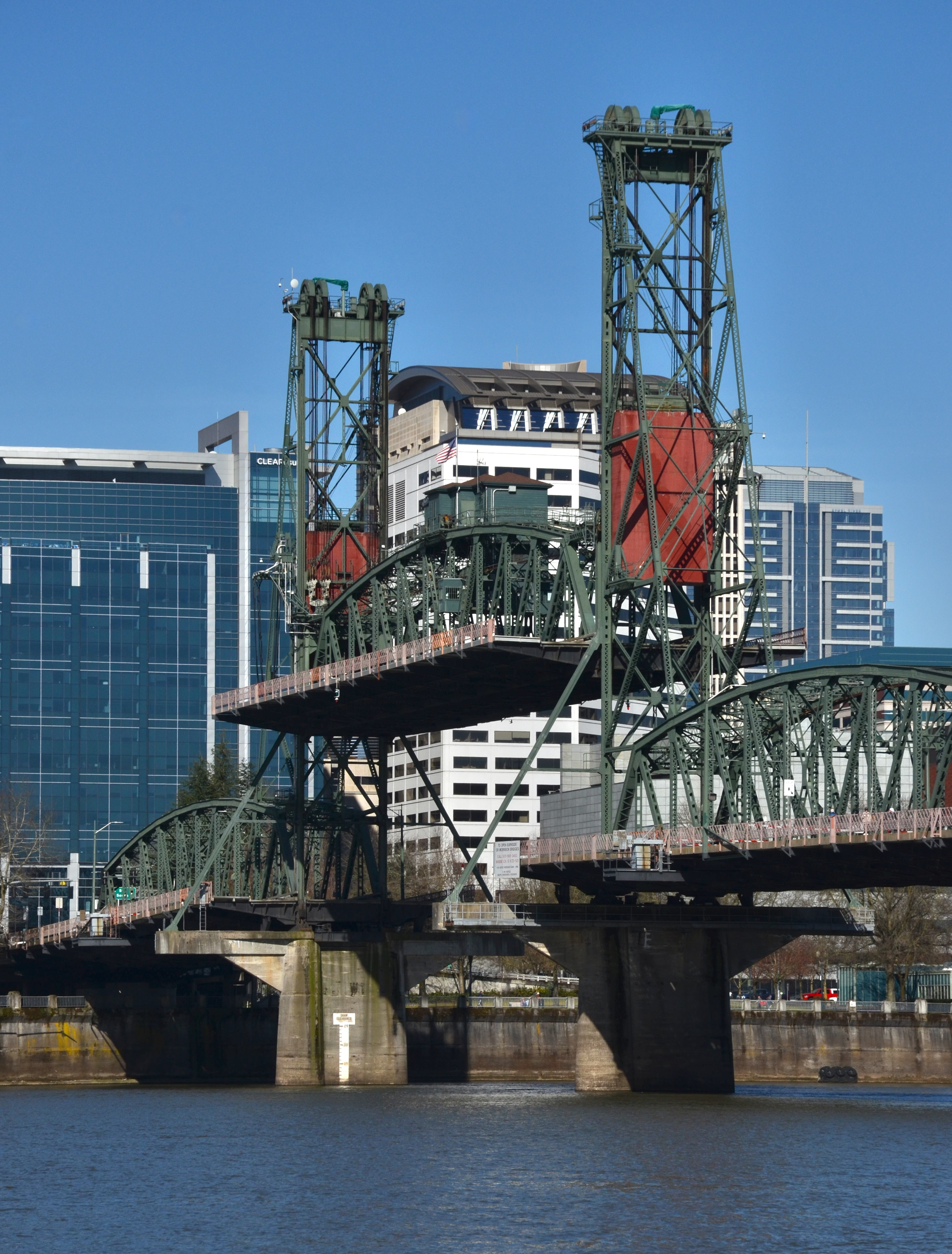
Lift span being raised

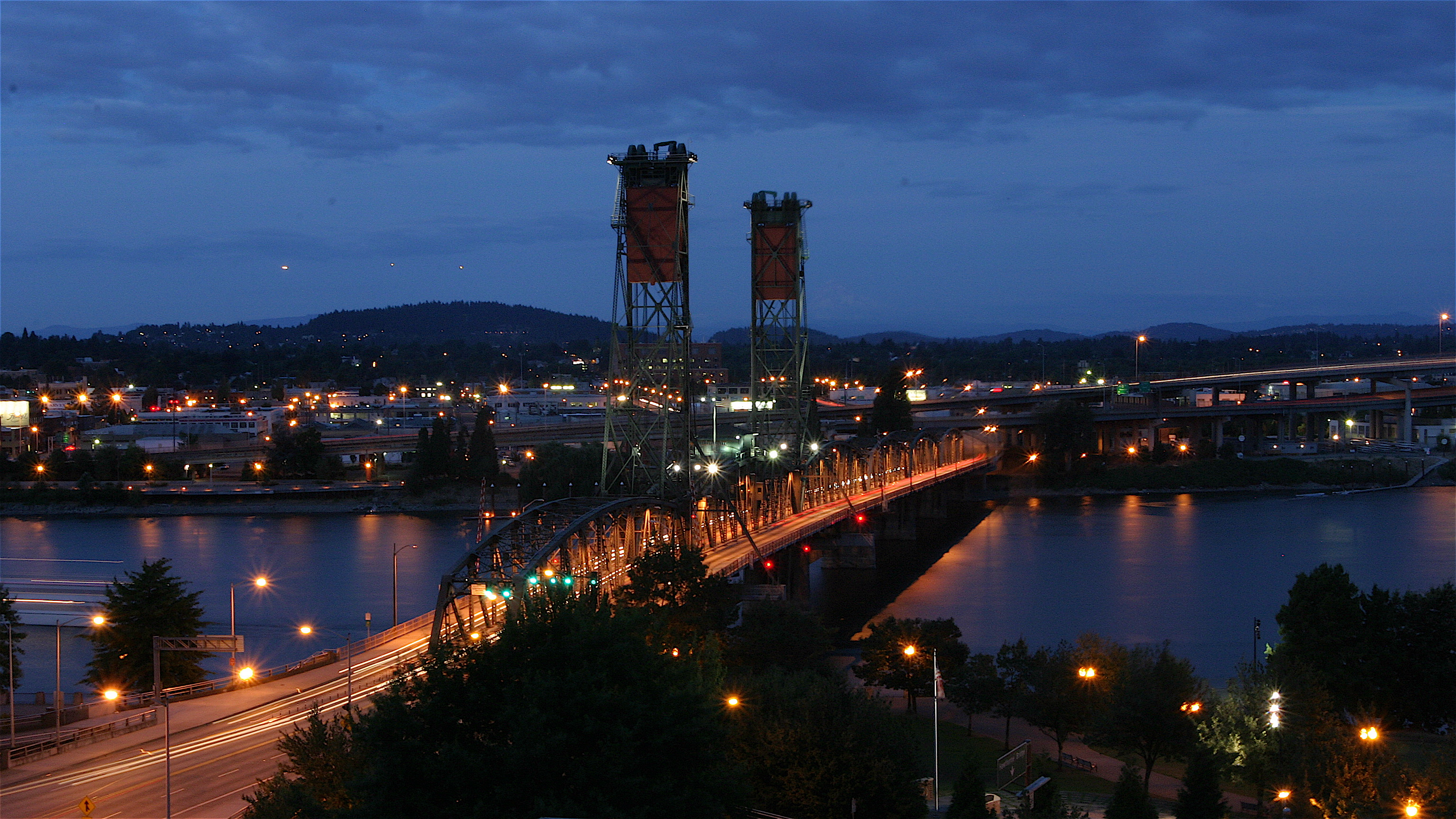
The bridge at night

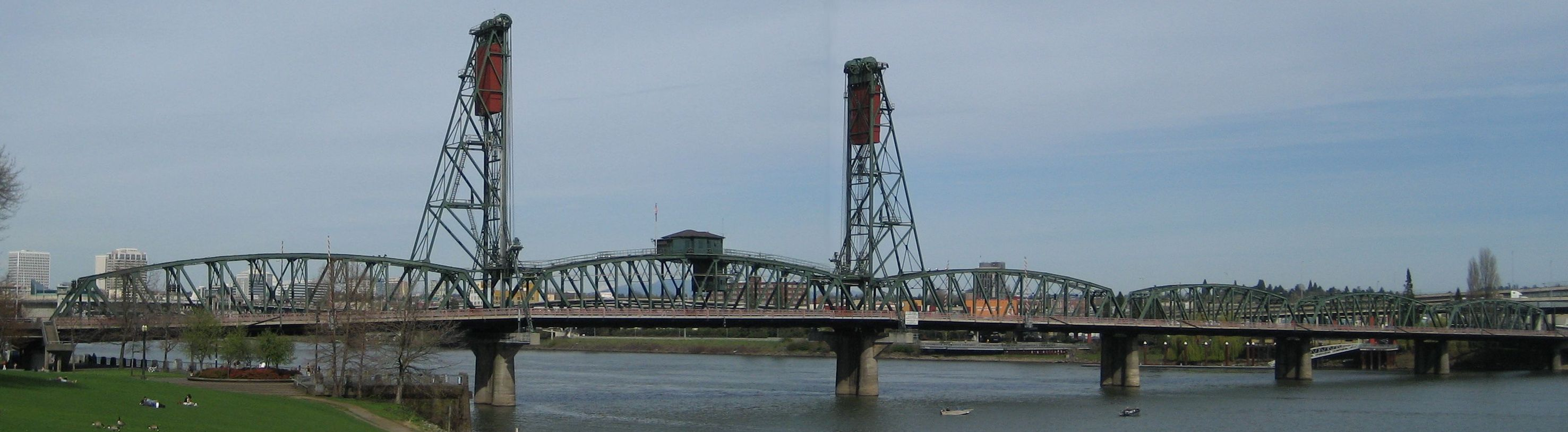
Panoramic view from south and west

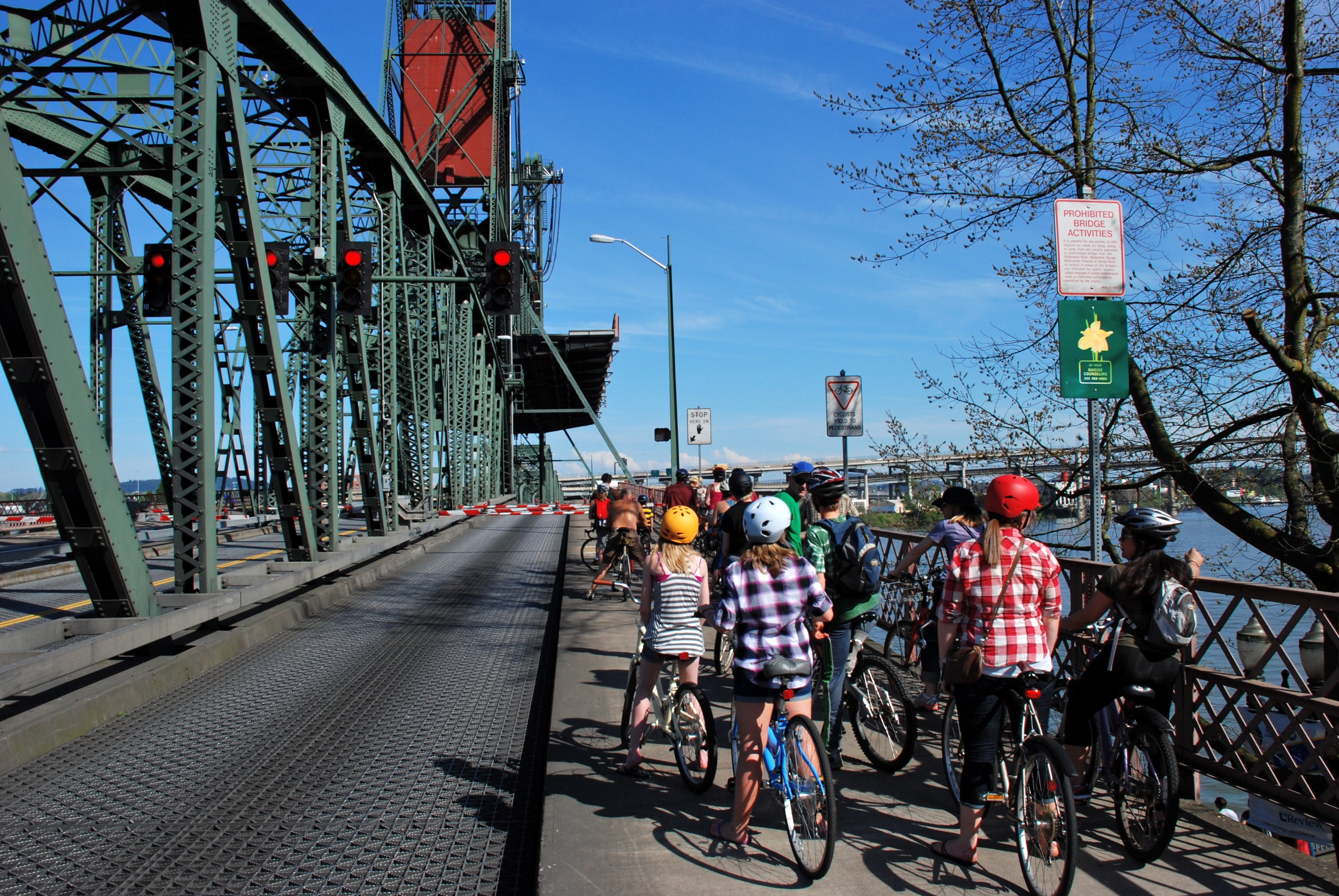
Cyclists waiting during a bridge lift

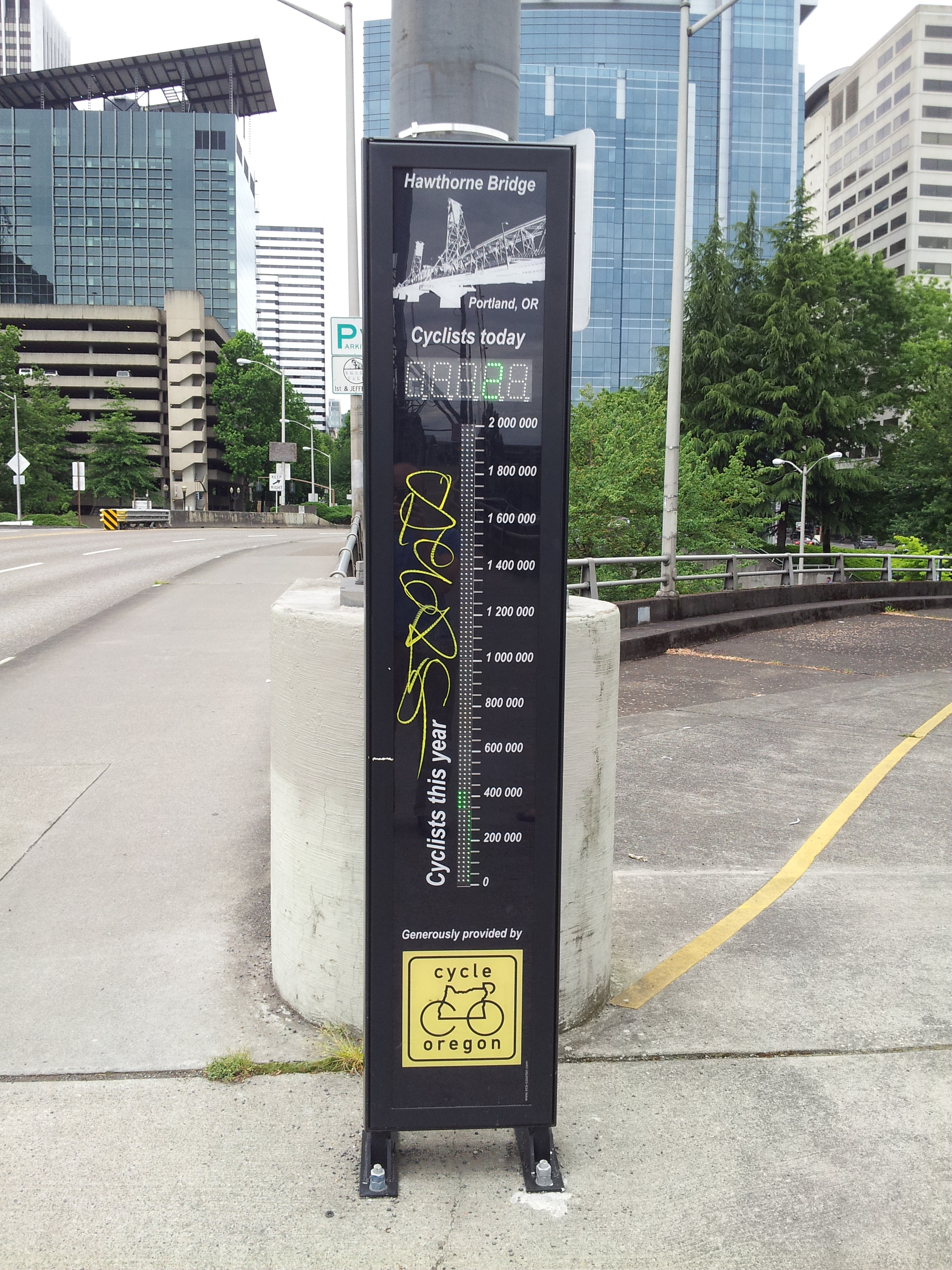
Bicycle counter in 2014

== See also ==
- Hands Across Hawthorne
- List of bridges documented by the Historic American Engineering Record in Oregon
- List of bridges on the National Register of Historic Places in Oregon
- List of crossings of the Willamette River
