= 2001 in art =

The year 2001 in art involved various significant events.

== Events ==
- 1 January – A black monolith measuring approximately 9 feet tall appears in Seattle, Washington's Magnuson Park, placed by an anonymous artist in reference to the movie 2001: A Space Odyssey.
- 4 June – Unveiling of Rachel Whiteread's Untitled Monument on the Fourth plinth, Trafalgar Square, London.
- 17 July – Inauguration of the Altamira cave replica created by Manuel Franquelo and Sven Nebel.
- 11 September
  - An estimated $100 million worth of art is destroyed in the 11 September attacks on New York City. Public artwork accounts for around $10 million of this figure, which includes works by Alexander Calder, Joan Miró and Roy Lichtenstein.
  - Fritz Koenig's Great Spherical Caryatid ("The Sphere") is the only surviving artwork following the September 11 attacks. It is repurposed as a memorial.
  - Several works of photojournalism become iconic for their portrayal of the events surrounding the September 11 attacks, including The Falling Man and Raising the Flag at Ground Zero.
- 27 September – Resale Rights Directive in the European Union provides a Droit de suite for artists.
- 1 October – The Ghibli Museum opens in Mitaka, Tokyo.
- 16 November – The Neue Galerie New York opens in Manhattan.

=== Undated ===
- A new wing in the Genia Schreiber University Art Gallery of the University of Tel Aviv, Israel, is dedicated to the memory of Michel Kikoine.
- The Leopold Museum opens in Vienna.
- The Pupils is created by Michaël Borremans in Belgium.
- They Could Still Serve is created by Ellen Gallagher in the United States.
- Traditional Chinese Studies Institute is created by Chen Danqing in China.

== Exhibitions ==
- March 2 until March 29 - Women’s Works: A Retrospective of Public Artists in New York City Parks 1967–2001 (with works by Alice Aycock, Elizabeth Egbert Janet Goldner, Jane Greengold, Esther (The Cricket) Grillo, Marisol, Louise Nevelson, Antonia Papatznaki, Niki de Saint Phalle, Ursula von Rydingsvard, Jerilea Zempel, and Elyn Zimmerman), at the Arsenal Gallery in Central Park in New York City, New York.
- September 11 until November 11 - Caspar David Friedrich: Moonwatchers at the Metropolitan Museum of Art in New York City.
- Max Beckmann retrospective at the Pompidou Centre, Paris

== Awards ==
- Archibald Prize – Nicholas Harding for John Bell as King Lear
- Beck's Futures – Tim Stoner
- Schock Prize in Visual Arts – Giuseppe Penone
- Turner Prize – Martin Creed for Work No. 227: The lights going on and off (Tate)
- Venice Biennial
  - Lion d'Or Golden Lion for Lifetime Achievement: Richard Serra (USA), Cy Twombly (USA)
  - Lion d'Or for Best Pavilion: Gregor Schneider (Germany)

== Works ==
- Michaël Borremans – The Pupils
- Ingvar Cronhammar - Elia in Herning, Denmark
- Jeremy Deller – Battle of Orgreave
- Lucian Freud – Portrait of Queen Elizabeth II
- Andy Goldsworthy - East Coast Cairn (displayed on the grounds of SUNY Purchase in Purchase, New York)
- Tracy Harris – Funnel
- Michael Landy - Breakdown
- Daniel Richter – Tarifa
- Rigga - sculptures in Portland, Oregon jointly with artists
- Grzegorz Łagowski - Miles Davis Monument
  - Ean Eldred - Echo Gate
  - James Harrison - Ghost Ship
  - Peter Nylen - Alluvial Wall
- Tamsie Ringler - Living Room (sculpture, Gresham, Oregon)
- Michael Stutz - Facing the Crowd
- Zeng Fanzhi – The Last Supper

== Deaths ==
=== January to June ===
- 14 January - Fred Hughes, American art executive (Founder of the Warhol Foundation) (b. 1943)
- 30 January – O. Winston Link, American photographer. (b. 1914)
- 12 February – Kristina Söderbaum, Swedish-German film actress, producer and photographer (b. 1912)
- 17 February – Barry Burman, English painter and educator (b. 1943)
- 18 February – Balthus, French modern artist (b. 1908)
- 4 March
  - Jean René Bazaine, French painter, stained glass window designer and writer (b. 1904)
  - Fred Lasswell, American cartoonist (b. 1916)
- 1 June – Hank Ketcham, American cartoonist (b. 1920)
- 19 June – David Sylvester, English art critic and curator (b. 1924)
- 27 June – Tove Jansson, Swedish-Finnish novelist, painter, illustrator and comic strip author (b. 1914)

=== July to December ===
- 1 July – Hélène de Beauvoir, French painter (b. 1910)
- 4 July – Anne Yeats, Irish painter and stage designer (b. 1919)
- 11 July – Herman Brood, Dutch musician, painter and media personality (b. 1946)
- 28 August – Juan Muñoz, Spanish sculptor (b. 1953)
- 23 October
  - Josh Kirby, English commercial artist (b. 1928)
  - Daniel Wildenstein, French international art dealer and scholar (b. 1917)
- 3 November – Sir Ernst Gombrich, Austrian-born art historian (b. 1909)
- 19 November – Marcelle Ferron, Canadian painter and stained glass artist (b. 1924)
- 25 November – Harry Devlin, American painter and illustrator (b. 1918)
- December – Mercedes Matter, American painter (b. 1913)
- 29 December – György Kepes, Hungarian-born painter, designer, educator and art theorist (b. 1906)
