= Stack Stalk =

Sculpture in Portland, Oregon

- The sculpture in 2015
- Artist: Ean Eldred, Rigga
- Year: 2001
- Type: Sculpture
- Medium: Mild steel; stainless steel; glass float; electric light
- Dimensions: 7.6 m × 0.61 m × 0.61 m (25 ft × 2 ft × 2 ft)
- Location: Portland, Oregon, United States; 45°31′12″N 122°40′00″W
- Owner: City of Portland and Multnomah County Public Art Collection courtesy of the Regional Arts & Culture Council

Stack Stalk is an outdoor 2001 sculpture by Ean Eldred and the architectural firm Rigga, located along the Eastbank Esplanade in Portland, Oregon.

== Description ==
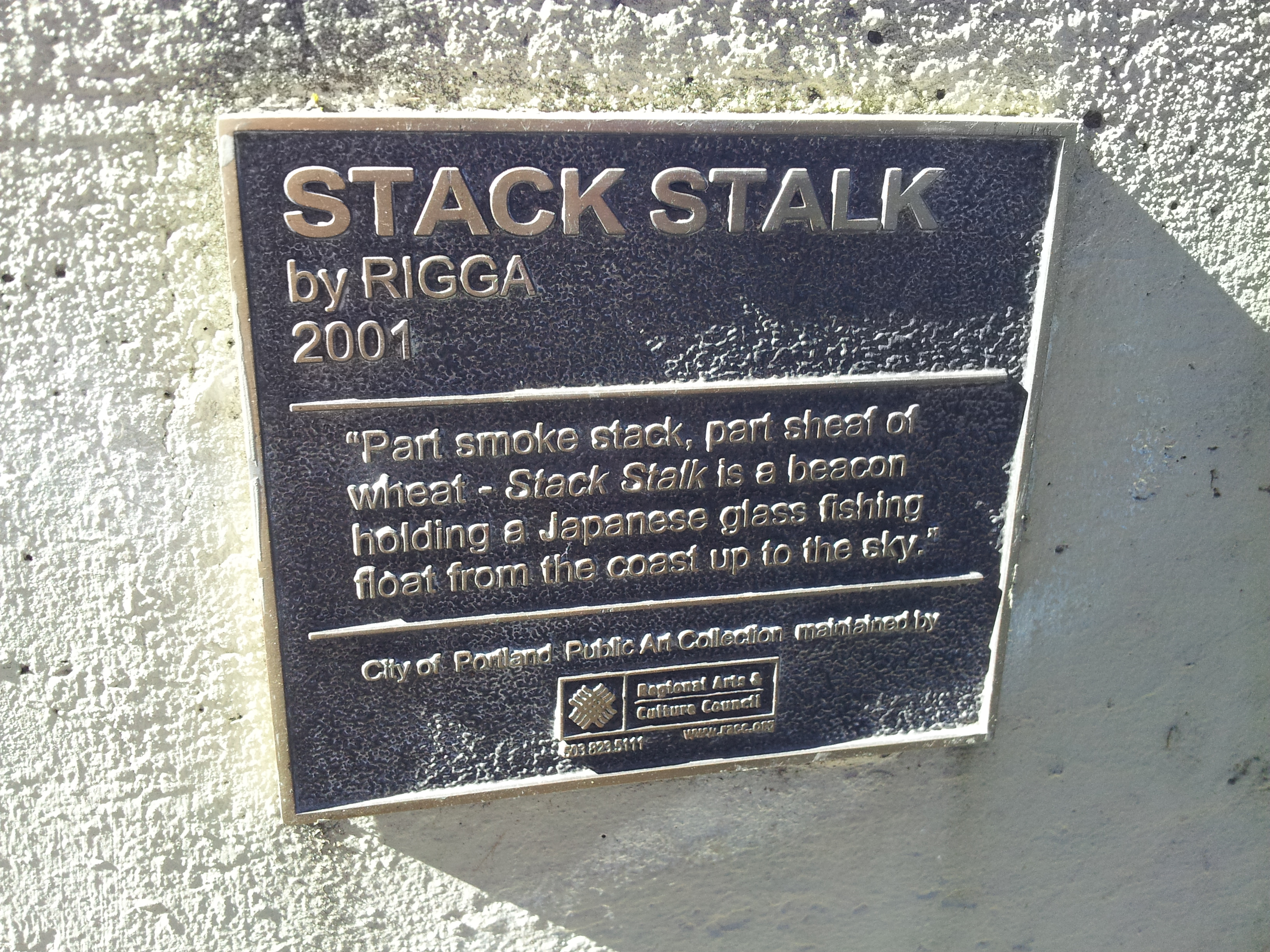
Plaque for the sculpture

The sculpture, designed by Ean Eldred and Rigga and completed in 2001, was funded by the City of Portland Development Commission's Percent for Art program. It is one of four by Rigga along the esplanade; the others are Alluvial Wall by Peter Nylen, Echo Gate by Eldred and Ghost Ship by James Harrison. Stack Stalk is composed of mild steel, stainless steel, glass float and electric light, and measures 25 feet (7.6 m) x 2 feet (0.61 m) x 2 feet (0.61 m). The abstract lamp post contains graduated cylinders stacked to support the glass float. cultureNOW describes it as "Part smoke stack, part sheaf of wheat... a beacon holding a Japanese glass fishing float from the coast up to the sky."

According to the Regional Arts & Culture Council, which administers the sculpture, it commemorates the "hybrid nature of the river-port as a meeting point for eastern Oregon's agriculture with ocean bound ships. Blending a stalk of barley with a rustic smoke stack, it suspends a Japanese glass float in the sky as a reminder of the rivers connection with the Pacific Ocean." It is part of the City of Portland and Multnomah County Public Art Collection courtesy of the Regional Arts & Culture Council.

== Reception ==
The sculpture was mentioned in Willamette Week's "Dr. Know" column in an article about phallic sculptures in Portland.

== See also ==
- 2001 in art
- Statue of Vera Katz, a 2006 sculpture of Vera Katz along the Eastbank Esplanade
