= Alluvial Wall =

Sculpture in Portland, Oregon

- The sculpture in 2015
- Artist: Peter Nylen, Rigga
- Year: 2001
- Type: Sculpture
- Medium: Mild steel, cast silicon bronze, cast iron, electric light
- Location: Portland, Oregon, United States; 45°31′13″N 122°39′59″W
- Owner: City of Portland and Multnomah County Public Art Collection courtesy of the Regional Arts & Culture Council

Alluvial Wall is an outdoor 2001 sculpture by Peter Nylen and the architectural firm Rigga located along the Eastbank Esplanade in Portland, Oregon.

== Description ==
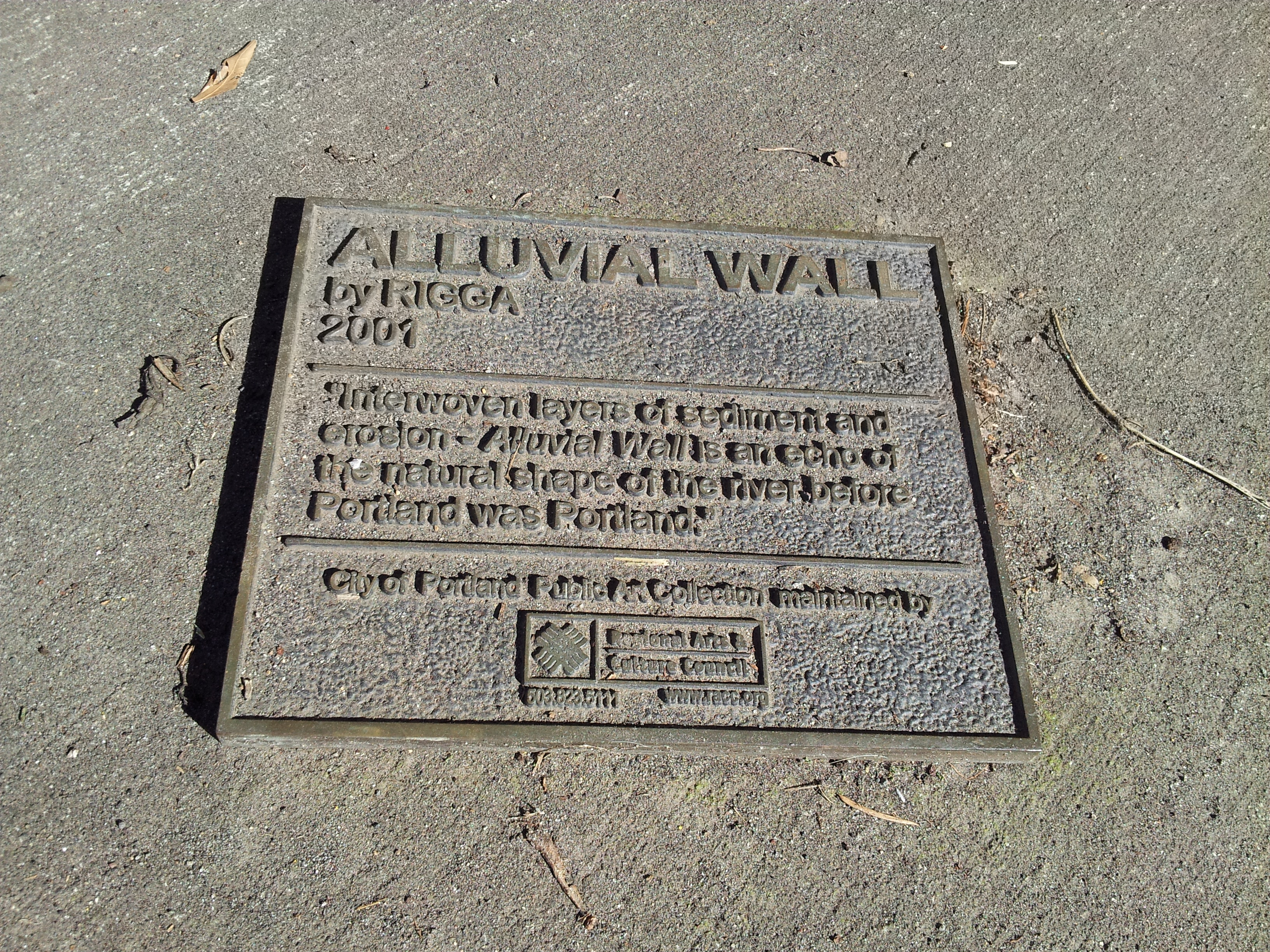
Plaque for the sculpture

The sculpture is made of mild steel, cast silicon bronze, cast iron and electric light, and measures 1 foot (0.30 m), 6 inches (15 cm) x 3 feet (0.91 m) x 13 feet (4.0 m), 6 inches (15 cm). It was funded by the City of Portland Development Commission's Percent for Art program.

According to the Regional Arts & Culture Council, which administers the work, Alluvial Wall "alludes to the interwoven layers of the river's pre-industrial alluvial geology. It is an echo of the natural shape of the river before Portland was Portland." In her walking tour of Portland, one author said the sculpture resembles "what you might see on a beach after the tide goes out". Its copper "kelp-like strips" are embedded with black metal objects, including a child's ball, a morel mushroom and a railroad spike.

The sculpture is one of four by Rigga along the esplanade; the others are Echo Gate and Stack Stalk by Ean Eldred and Ghost Ship by James Harrison. Alluvial Wall is part of the City of Portland and Multnomah County Public Art Collection courtesy of the Regional Arts & Culture Council.

== See also ==
- 2001 in art
- Statue of Vera Katz, a 2006 sculpture of Vera Katz along the Eastbank Esplanade
