= Echo Gate =

Sculpture in Portland, Oregon

- The sculpture in 2015
- Artist: Ean Eldred, Rigga
- Year: 2001
- Type: Sculpture
- Medium: Copper
- Dimensions: 4.0 m × 2.7 m × 2.1 m (13 ft × 9 ft × 7 ft)
- Location: Portland, Oregon, United States; 45°31′02″N 122°40′03″W
- Owner: City of Portland and Multnomah County Public Art Collection courtesy of the Regional Arts & Culture Council

Echo Gate is an outdoor 2001 sculpture by Ean Eldred and the architectural firm Rigga, located along the Eastbank Esplanade in Portland, Oregon, United States. It was funded by the City of Portland Development Commission's Percent for Art program, and is part of the City of Portland and Multnomah County Public Art Collection courtesy of the Regional Arts & Culture Council.

== Description ==
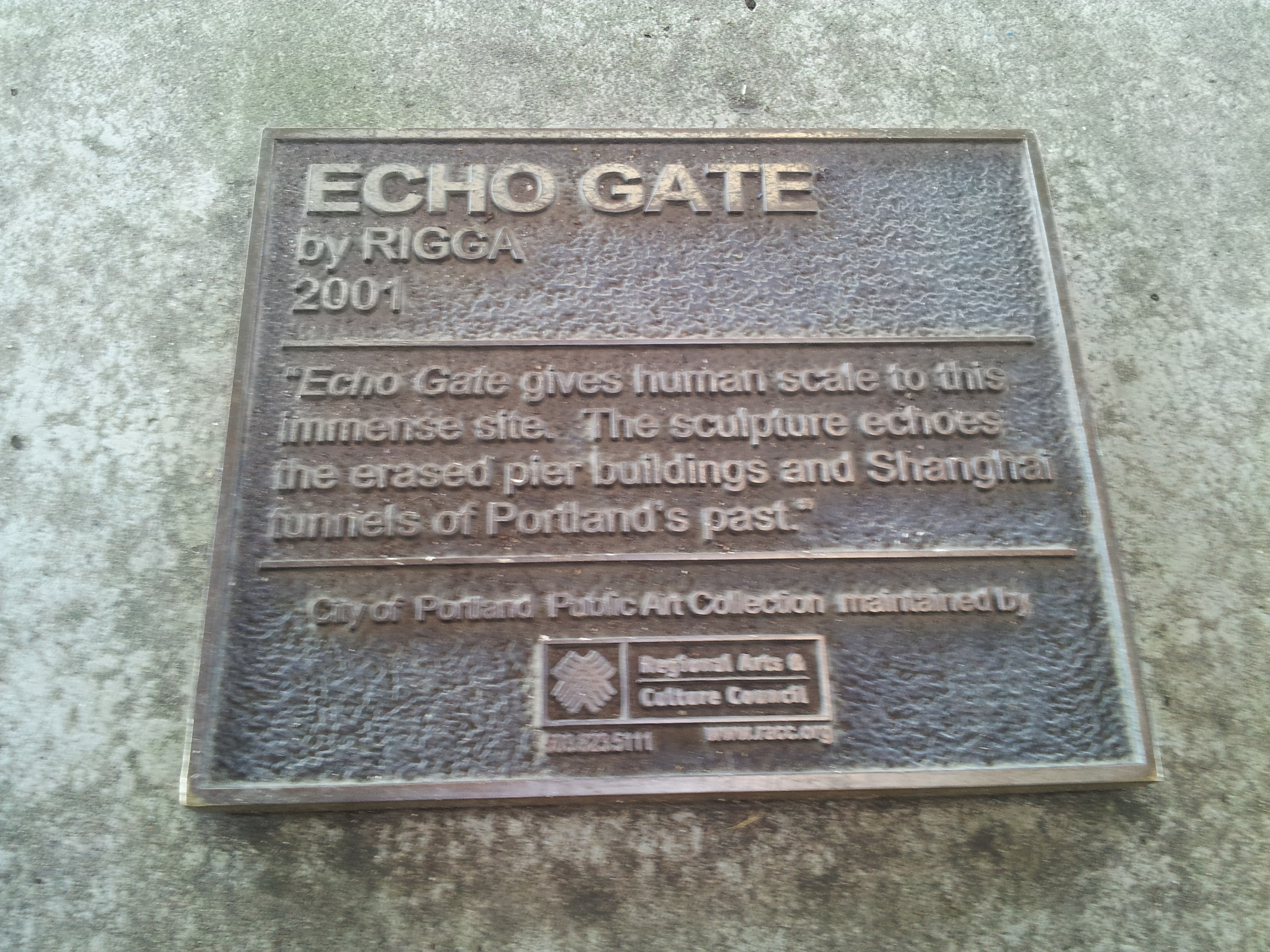
Plaque for the sculpture

Echo Gate, designed by Ean Eldred and Rigga and installed under the Morrison Bridge in southeast Portland in 2001, is made of copper and measures 13 feet (4.0 m) x 9 feet (2.7 m) x 7 feet (2.1 m). The abstract gateway features a round opening within a folder rectangle. The Regional Arts & Culture Council, which administers the work, offers the following description: "This artwork is a gate oriented to both the pathway and the river. A sculptural hybrid echoing past pier buildings, the Shanghai tunnels and marine barnacles, it becomes both crenellation and crustacean. The sculpture gives human scale to this immense site and suggests bending an ear to the river amidst the rushing decibels of the freeway."

The piece was funded by the City of Portland Development Commission's Percent for Art program, and is part of the City of Portland and Multnomah County Public Art Collection courtesy of the Regional Arts & Culture Council. The sculpture is one of four by Rigga along the esplanade; the others are Alluvial Wall by Peter Nylen, Ghost Ship by James Harrison and Stack Stalk by Ean Eldred.

== See also ==
- 2001 in art
- Statue of Vera Katz, a 2006 sculpture of Vera Katz along the Eastbank Esplanade
