= Hannelore Knuts =

Belgian actress and fashion model

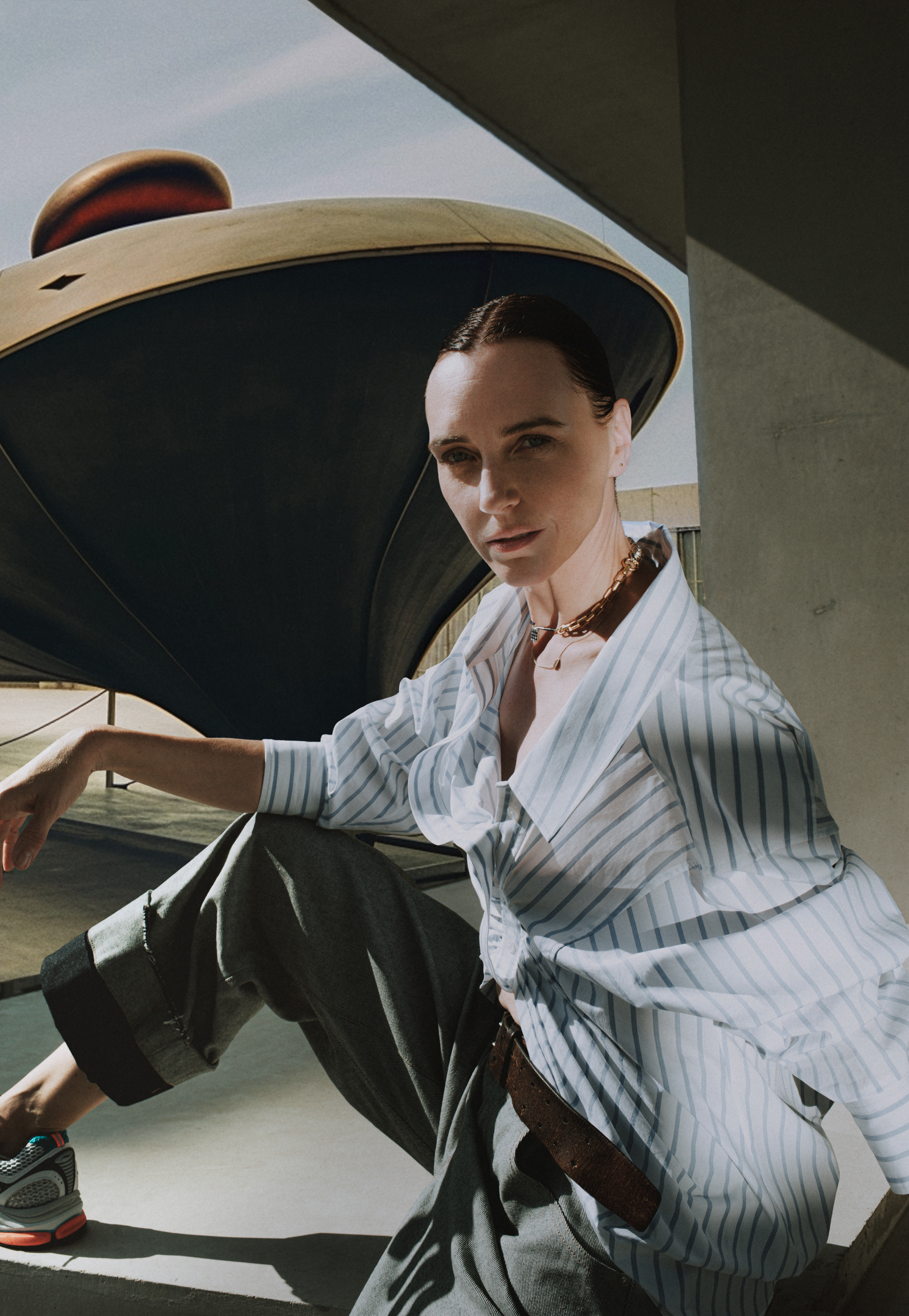
- Hannelore Knuts by Lalo Gonzalez
- Born: 4 November 1977 (age 49); Hasselt, Belgium
- Occupations: Model, actress & media personality, artist, meditation teacher
- Modeling information
- Height: 178 cm (5 ft 10 in)
- Hair color: Brunette (current)
- Eye color: Blue
- Agency: Platform Agency (Amsterdam), Elite (Paris), Models 1 (London), The Model CoOp (New York)

Hannelore Knuts (born 4 November 1977) is a Belgian model, actress, and artist known for her androgynous appearance and versatility. Throughout her career, she has collaborated with numerous top photographers like Steven Meisel, Inez and Vinoodh, Karl Lagerfeld, Steven Klein and Juergen Teller as well as designers and brands including Alexander McQueen, Prada, Hermès, Chanel, Dior, Jean Paul Gaultier, Valentino, Dolce & Gabbana, Ann Demeulemeester and many more. She has appeared on multiple international covers of Vogue as well as V, Dazed, Harper's Bazaar and L'Officiel - solidifying her position as an icon in the world of fashion.

== Beginnings and the Belgian Wave ==
Hannelore Knuts was introduced to fashion as a photography student at the Royal Academy of Fine Arts Antwerp. She participated in the annual Antwerp Fashion Department student fashion show of 1998 which included the graduate collection of notable designer Bernhard Willhelm. That first appearance as a student led to her walking the runway for Veronique Branquinho in 1998, which caught the attention of a modelling scout and led to a feature role in a documentary on rising models. Despite initially declining the offer to become a fulltime model, Hannelore eventually took the opportunity and started her modelling career, quickly landing an influential Steven Meisel campaign for Moschino and Yohji Yamamoto catalogue for spring-summer 1999.

Her androgynous features quickly garnered recognition, and she gained exposure through her early runway and editorial work with designers such as Alexander McQueen and Jil Sander while becoming the protégé of acclaimed photographers Inez and Vinoodh. Her career launched what is now known as the 'Belgian Wave' of models dominating the '00s fashion industry.

== 2000s icon ==
Throughout the early 2000s, Hannelore Knuts became a notable presence in fashion, featuring on covers and in editorials of magazines like Vogue, W Magazine, i-D, Self Service, V, Dazed, Numéro, Jalouse and many more, landing a record number of five Vogue Italia cover variations in 2000 for three consecutive issues. She collaborated with several of the industry's prolific photographers, including Steven Klein, Steven Meisel, Patrick Demarchelier, Juergen Teller, Peter Lindbergh and more. Her appearance in campaigns and runway shows for Prada, Gucci, Dolce & Gabbana, Chanel, Dior, Versace, Jean Paul Gaultier, Fendi, Givenchy, Alexander McQueen, Missoni, Moschino, Valentino, Louis Vuitton, Dries Van Noten, Miu Miu, Marc Jacobs and other leading luxury brands positioned her as a firmly established supermodel. In 2008, Hannelore created her first luxury design collaboration: a mini collection of handbags for Belgian leatherware house Delvaux.

== Ultramegalore ==
The 2010 Hannelore Knuts career "anti-retrospective", 'Ultramegalore' at Modemuseum Hasselt, gained widespread attention and reviews from media outlets such as The New York Times and Interview Magazine. The exhibition was curated by Hannelore and filled the museum's three floors with installations featuring the photographers, designers, painters and musicians she worked with and was inspired by in her career so far. The expo featured an uncredited contribution by Nick Cave as well as works by Ugo Rondinone, Juergen Teller, Azzedine Alaïa, Philip-Lorca diCorcia, Luc Tuymans and more. The exhibition also led to a guest editorship by Hannelore for the April 2010 issue of ELLE Belgium.

== Later work ==
Following the first decade of her modelling career, Hannelore Knuts broadened her repertoire collaborating with fine art imagemakers like Michael Thompson, Tim Walker, Yelena Yemchuk, David Armstrong, Danko Steiner, Lernert & Sander, Joseph Lally, Urs Fischer, Mario Sorrenti and Philip Metten. She ventured out into different creative pursuits including acting and dance. Knuts made her official acting debut in 2010 film 'Innercoma', directed by Toon Aerts, followed by performances in Nicolas Provost's 2011 drama 'The Invader'. In 2012, she took on the role of David Bowie in the Radio Soulwax and Wim Reygaert film 'Dave', a performance that garnered critical acclaim.

Hannelore was a participant in 'Sterren op de Dansvloer' ('Dancing with the Stars') on Belgian TV channel VTM in 2012 and danced the tango during the Jean Paul Gaultier SS13 runway show.

She then played the role of Maria Martins in Marcel Dzama's 'dadaist love story' 'A Jester's Dance' in 2013. Hannelore went on to collaborate with more artists and modelled as a muse for 2013 painting 'The Angel' by esteemed Belgian artist Michaël Borremans. Knuts later starred in the W Magazine short film 'The Fight', directed by Douglas Keeve, alongside Glenn O'Brien and Arden Wohl.

Hannelore worked on creative direction and photography for Paris brand Pallas, designing demi-couture tailored looks unveiled in 2013. She also acted as an editor-at-large for 10 magazine and was credited as a stylist for Document Journal and Hermès Magazine. In 2014, Hannelore performed in a live art installation by Lawrence Malstaf which saw her vacuum-sealed above a Paris Fashion Week runway presentation by Dutch designer Iris Van Herpen.

Furthering her modelling legacy, Hannelore Knuts later became the face of high-profile campaigns, runway shows and magazine editorials for global brands like Gucci, Valentino Haute Couture, Harper's Bazaar, Dior Beauty, Vogue Spain and landed a March 2023 cover for Wallpaper* magazine.

In early 2023, it was announced that Hannelore would be a hosting jury member for new reality series 'Belgium's Next Top Model', debuting on Streamz as from September 2023.

== Advocacy and mindfulness teaching ==
Beyond her modelling and creative career, Hannelore Knuts has been an advocate for mental health in the fashion industry and a charity campaign supporter. She acted as a spokesperson for Designers Against Aids in the Belgian Parliament and raised awareness about the vulnerabilities and challenges faced by models, promoting open discussions on mental health through a series of talks.

Hannelore also became a certified mindfulness and compassion meditation teacher in 2021 after completing the course taught by Tara Brach and Jack Kornfield at UC Berkeley Greater Good Science Center. She shared her most useful mindfulness tips in a recurring 2022 TV segment titled 'Happy Hannelore' on the programme 'Iedereen Beroemd'.

== Filmography ==
TV and film work
Year	Title	Role	Director	Notes	Ref.
1998	Een droom van een meisje	as self		documentary	
2003	Strike Me Pink	as self	Greg Kadel		
2010	Innercoma	Mother of the Universe	Philip Metten	short film	
2010	Magnatricity		Christian Joy	short film	
2011	The Invader	La naturiste	Nicolas Provost		
2011	Natural Beauty	as self	Lernert and Sander	short film	
2012	Dave	Dave	Wim Reygaert		
2012	Sterren op de Dansvloer	as self		Recurring	
2013	A Jester's Dance	Maria	Marcel Dzama		
2013	Lust for Life	as self		Recurring	
2014	The Fight	as self	Douglas Keeve		
2016	Human Sanctuary	as self	Daniel Sannwald		
2022	Happy Hannelore	as self		Recurring	
2022	Vrede op Aarde	as self		TV appearance	
2023	De Ideale Wereld	as self		TV appearance	
2023	Belgium's Next Top Model	as self		Recurring	

== Bibliography ==
- Knuts, Hannelore (2010). Ultramegalore. Ludion ISBN 9789055449583
