= Ghost Ship (sculpture) =

Sculpture in Portland, Oregon

- The sculpture in 2015
- Artist: James Harrison; Rigga
- Year: 2001
- Type: Sculpture
- Medium: Copperplate; copper bar; stainless steel; art glass; metal halide lamp; halogen lamp
- Subject: Ghost ship
- Dimensions: 2.4 m × 0.61 m × 2.7 m (8 ft × 2 ft × 9 ft)
- Location: Portland, Oregon, United States; 45.519185°N 122.66668°W
- Owner: City of Portland and Multnomah County Public Art Collection courtesy of the Regional Arts & Culture Council

Ghost Ship is an outdoor 2001 sculpture by James Harrison and Rigga, a group of local artists, located along the Eastbank Esplanade in Portland, Oregon. It is made of copper, stainless steel, art glass, and two lamps. It is part of the City of Portland and Multnomah County Public Art Collection courtesy of the Regional Arts & Culture Council.

== Description and history ==
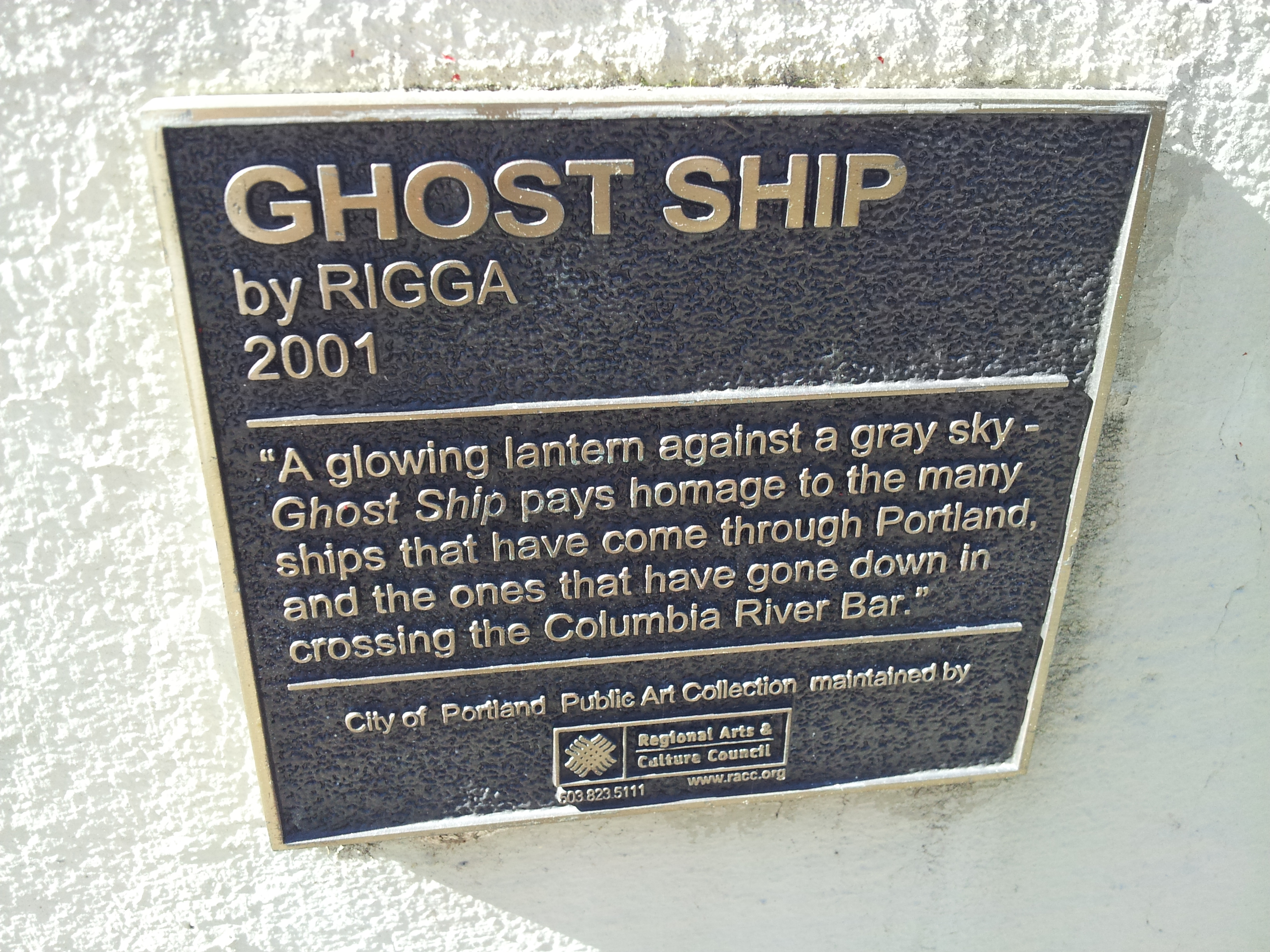
Plaque for the sculpture

Ghost Ship is located at 5 Southeast Madison Avenue, along the Eastbank Esplanade. Installed in 2001, the sculpture is one of four by Rigga along the esplanade; the others are Echo Gate and Stack Stalk by Ean Eldred and Alluvial Wall by Peter Nylen. It is hexagonal-shaped, measures 8 feet (2.4 m) x 2 feet (0.61 m) x 9 feet (2.7 m), and is made of copperplate, copper bar, stainless steel, hundreds of pieces of art glass, a metal halide lamp, and a halogen lamp. Its base measures 3.5 feet (1.1 m).

Ghost Ship honors Portland's maritime history and commemorates the ships which wrecked while crossing the Columbia River bar. The work has been described as a "sculptural ghost illuminated from within, a beacon from the past marking the river's edge". The Smithsonian Institution categorizes the work as abstract, architectural (ship) and fantasy (ghost). It was funded by the City of Portland Portland Development Commission's Percent for Art program and is part of the City of Portland and Multnomah County Public Art Collection courtesy of the Regional Arts & Culture Council.

== See also ==
- 2001 in art
- List of Oregon shipwrecks
- Statue of Vera Katz, a 2006 sculpture of Vera Katz along the Eastbank Esplanade
