= Statue of Vera Katz =

Statue in Portland, Oregon, U.S.

Vera Katz
- The statue in 2015
- Artist: Bill Bane
- Year: 2006
- Type: Sculpture
- Medium: Bronze
- Subject: Vera Katz
- Dimensions: 130 cm × 46 cm × 46 cm (53 in × 18 in × 18 in)
- Location: Portland, Oregon, United States; 45.513939°N 122.668202°W
- Owner: Regional Arts & Culture Council

Vera Katz, also known as Mayor, Vera Katz, is an outdoor bronze sculpture depicting Vera Katz created by American artist Bill Bane. Unveiled in 2006, it is located along the Eastbank Esplanade in Portland, Oregon. Katz, a former mayor of the city between 1993 and 2005, supported arts and culture during her tenure and established Oregon's Percent for Art program. She was also instrumental in developing the Eastbank Esplanade, which is named after her. The sculpture has received a mostly positive reception and has inspired people to adorn it with clothing, flowers and makeup.

== Description ==
The statue measures 53 inches (130 cm) x 18 inches (46 cm) x 18 inches (46 cm) and rests on an orange triangular base. Katz is depicted wearing a Portland rose on her lapel.

Portland State University's Daily Vanguard described Katz as: "leaning close to a small body with legs crossed and hands in, squeezed together in her lap as if she's cold, too. The teeth are also bared and unusually straight, creating the impression that Katz might snap at passers-by. But overall, the face is open and the hair is particularly lifelike." According to The Oregonian, the sculpture provides a lap on which children can pose and sometimes frightens passersby at night. It is part of the collection of the Regional Arts & Culture Council (RACC). The organization has said: "it seems fitting that [Katz's] political leadership and love for the arts should come together in a public tribute to her".

Bane's study for the sculpture, called Vera, is a bronze bust measuring 18 inches (46 cm) x 11 inches (28 cm). The bust is part of a private collection.

== History ==
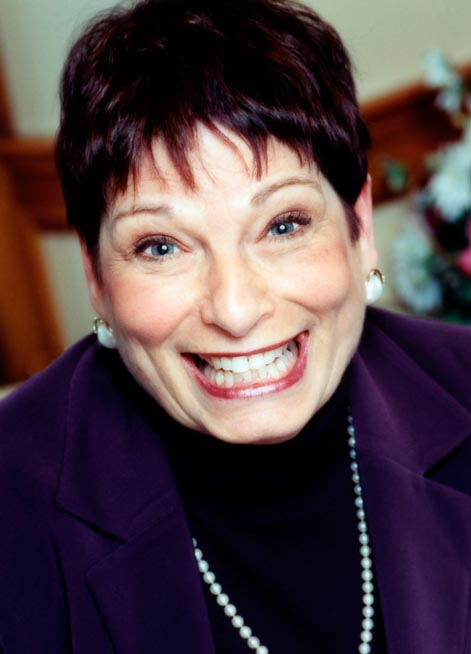
Mayor Vera Katz

The statue was financed by a "group of generous Portlanders", and its commission was managed by RACC with assistance from members of Katz's former staff. It was unveiled on June 2, 2006, on the plaza at the south end of the Esplanade, just north of the Hawthorne Bridge and Main Street marker.

Katz attended the statue's surprise unveiling during an event organized by RACC and funded by friends. Also in attendance were Mayor Tom Potter, three city commissioners, Bill Bane, friends, and former staff members. Wearing a lei brought by her son, Katz said the statue looked "far more beautiful than [her]" and encouraged city officials to continue expanding the Eastbank Esplanade south.

The statue went missing temporarily in October 2013, leading to a promise to investigate on Twitter by then-Mayor Sam Adams. In reality it had been temporarily removed for repairs by RACC and Portland Parks. On September 21, 2016, the statue was vandalized. The graffiti included a swastika on the chest of the statue, and writing on the wall next to the Katz statue which read "Vera wants affordable housing". It is unclear whether the vandalism on the wall and statue were both done by the same person.

In 2020, during the COVID-19 pandemic, a face mask was affixed to the statue as well as other local artworks.

== Reception ==
In 2006, Willamette Week included the sculpture in its annual "Best of Portland" list, under the category "Best Mayoral Monument". According to the paper:

... Bane managed to capture much of the ex-mayor's character: Her eyes are friendly and her hair as wild as ever. But Katz's signature grin is a little stiff, a little too aggressive. Leaning forward, she looks as if she might take a bite out of the next passerby. Which by the way, seems appropriate when you look back on her days behind the mayoral desk. Maybe monochromatic bronze just isn't the right medium for a woman as colorful as ol' Vera. Where's the red blazer? Our suggestion: Get this lady some accessories! The right hat or scarf could make that brown pantsuit really work.

Daily Vanguard's Celina Monte called the sculpture "fabulously strange" and said it illustrated the "straightforward, tactile and symmetrical properties" of some of Bane's other work. The work has been included in at least one published walking tour of Portland, which noted its function as a meeting location for bicyclists and pedestrians. In 2013, RACC's public art collections manager said the work has received mostly "positive attention" and has been outfitted with hats, flowers and "yarn-bombed" sweaters. It has also attracted books, hats, lipstick, paint and even a "mohawk of cake frosting".

== See also ==
- 2006 in art
- Alluvial Wall, Echo Gate, Ghost Ship and Stack Stalk, 2001 sculptures along the Eastbank Esplanade
