= The Angel (painting) =

Painting by Michaël Borremans

The Angel, oil on canvas, 200 cm × 300 cm (79 in × 118 in)

The Angel is a 2013 painting by the Belgian Michaël Borremans. Painted in oil on a three-metre-high canvas, it shows a blonde woman in a light pink dress and black face paint. It was made in 2013 after Borremans found the dress in a carnival store and had the fashion model Hannelore Knuts pose with it in his studio. Critics have described the painting as enigmatic, androgynous and eye-catching. It was first exhibited in Antwerp in 2013 and was the main publicity image for a Borremans exhibition held in Brussels, Tel Aviv and Dallas in 2014–2015.

== Background ==
Michaël Borremans is a Belgian painter born in 1963. He is known for works he creates by photographing models in a studio, often with enigmatic costumes and props, and painting them in oil from a computer screen. He is influenced by Old Master techniques, including how painters like Johannes Vermeer used a camera obscura to incorporate photographic techniques.

According to Borremans, his painting The Angel began with a dress he found in a carnival store and immediately found appealing. He considered painting a man wearing the dress but thought it would be too easy. He chose to use the Belgian fashion model Hannelore Knuts who he had met previously through her ex-boyfriend Nicolas Provost, a video artist. Borremans described her as "tall, slim and a bit androgynous". Knuts modelled for the painting while she was in Belgium to participate in Sterren op de Dansvloer, the Flemish version of Dancing with the Stars, and said it felt good to stand still.

== Subject and composition ==
The Angel shows a tall woman who stands in front of a wall. She wears a floor-length light pink dress with short sleeves. Her blonde hair is combed back, her eyes are closed and her face is painted black. The painting is in oil on canvas and has the dimensions 200 cm × 300 cm (79 in × 118 in).

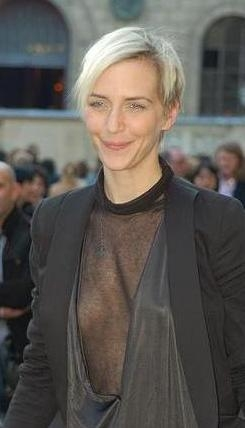
Hannelore Knuts in 2006

Knuts posed for The Angel at Borremans' second Ghent studio, which had been repurposed from a Catholic chapel in 2012. Borremans asked her to express serenity and photographed her from various angles with different backgrounds and light, before choosing one picture to paint. The combed-back hair was her idea; she thought it would make the character harder to identify or place in time. The face paint, which Borremans applied, was a paint used for Zwarte Piet makeup. Borremans says there is no key to interpreting his works and he intentionally includes details that point in contradictory directions. He says creating The Angel helped him in a personal way, as he suffered emotionally at the time and it made him move on, and he thinks it has universality: "Gender, racism... I wanted to point to all these things. It's a portrait of humanity in a way." The painting process took one week in 2013. Borremans says it was very intense and he thought something bad would happen if he left the studio before it was finished.

== Reception ==
De Standaard's Geert Van der Speeten said The Angel stands out among Borremans' paintings because the human figure looks idealised. He described her as an androgynous version of a Disney character. The same newspaper's Jan Van Hove called the image eye-catching and mysterious. When it was shown in Brussels, it received considerable spread in social media; Le Soir called it "the most photogenic painting" of the exhibition.

Maggie Gray of Apollo and Graham Lawson of The Jerusalem Post stressed the enigmatic aspect of The Angel. Lawson highlighted the androgynity of the figure, likened her to a commedia dell'arte performer and said she is "stately and beautiful" regardless of the painting's origin or meaning. Gray, writing in 2016, said the painting had become "something of an icon".

== Provenance ==
The Angel was part of The People from the Future Are not to Be Trusted, a Borremans solo exhibition held from 1 September to 12 October 2013 at the gallery Zeno X in Antwerp. It was part of a large, travelling retrospective of Borremans' works titled As Sweet as It Gets. This was held at the Centre for Fine Arts in Brussels from 22 February to 3 August 2014, the Tel Aviv Museum of Art from 2 September 2014 to 31 January 2015 and the Dallas Museum of Art from 15 March to 5 July 2015. The Angel was the primary publicity image for the retrospective and is used as cover art for the book Michaël Borremans: As Sweet as It Gets (2014), published on the occasion of the event. It is on the cover of Herman Rohaert's poetry collection Beyond here lies nothin' (2019).
