= Tears Flooding the Autumnal Fields =

Painting by Chen Danqing

- Artist: Chen Danqing
- Year: 1976
- Medium: Oil on canvas
- Dimensions: 164 cm × 235 cm (65 in × 93 in)
- Location: Private collection

Tears Flooding the Autumnal Fields (also known as Tear Drops On the Harvest Land) is an oil painting completed in 1976 by the Chinese artist Chen Danqing. It depicts Tibetans crying as they listen to the news of Mao Zedong’s death on the radio in harvest of a wheat field.
