= Sheepherder (painting) =

1980 painting by Chen Danqing

- Artist: Chen Danqing
- Year: 1980
- Type: Oil on wood
- Dimensions: 79 cm × 52 cm (31 in × 20 in)

Sheepherder is a 1980 oil painting created by Chinese artist Chen Danqing in 1980 in Tibet. This painting is considered one of the Tibet Series. He captures a moment where a sheepherder takes to kiss a woman.
