= Antonia Papatznaki =

- Born: 1960 (age 65–66); Chania, Crete, Greece
- Known for: Sculpture mixed-media
- Website: https://www.antoniapapatzanaki.com/

Antonia Papatzanaki (born 1960 in Chania, Crete, Greece) is a Greek born Greek and American artist. Primarily, a light sculptor, she maintains studios in both New York City and Athens.

== Biography ==
Papatznaki was educated at the Athens School of Fine Arts and received her MFA at Pratt Institute in Brooklyn. Papatznaki also studied in Vienna, Austria at the esteemed Vienna Hochschule für Angewandte Kunst. In 2000 she had a one woman show at the Pratt Institute Sculpture Park. In 2000-2001 she installed "Agora" in Battery Park through the "Art in Parks" program of the New York City Parks Department. Her work was then included in the group exhibition / examination of the practitioner's creative processes, "Women's Works 1967-2001: A Retrospective of Public Artists in New York City Parks" of the female artists who have shown as part of the NYC Parks Department aesthetic efforts. The participating artists in the exhibit also included: Alice Aycock, Janet Goldner, Marisol, Louise Nevelson, Niki de Saint Phalle, and Ursula von Rydingsvard.

In 2010 Papatznaki's work was the subject of a one woman exhibition at the Contemporary Art Museum of Crete titled Robust Matte and Image.

In 2021 Papatznaki had a NYC citywide exhibition installed on selected bus stop screens of showing her video light works of cellular structures of plants called "Thank You for My Breaths".

From November 6 until December 2, 2025 a solo show of her work "The Light of Nature" was mounted at the Tenri Cultural Institute in Manhattan.

In 2026 she had a solo exhibition at the Greek consulate in New York "Microscopies", curated by Dr. Thalia Vrachopoulos. Jonathan Goodman in reviewing the exhibition in Tussle said of it ,,,,"As a demonstration of contemporary visual thinking, the exhibition reveals the artist’s determination to work out compositions whose execution relays the smallest kinds of systems found in nature. But they are also writ large, in ways that call us to attention by arrangements notable for their well-spaced intervals, looking sometimes like stained glass, sometimes like soap bubbles"....

The art writer and muti-media artist Mark Bloch describes Papatznaki's work in a review of "The Light of Nature" exhibition he penned for Whitehot Magazine ..."Antonia Papatzanaki is a sculptor of light, transforming that elusive “material” into both a palette to be drawn from and a vessel into which to build an unconscious channel of communication between her and the viewer".... Then as Bloch also notes in his piece, ..."she transforms drawings which she creates inspired by her fascination with elements of nature into light sculptures. These works are an integral part of her process and finalized works"...

Papatznaki's sculpture LightHouse is permanently installed at the Kato Patisia Square Metro Station, in Athens. In 2017 she collaborated with Rayva and created light sculptures for one of their models of installable home movie theaters. Two of her works, a light sculpture and a bronze, are featured in the June-July 2024 issue of the magazine Minoan Wave, These Papatznaki pieces, among other works are held in the collection of Costas and Eirini Schizakis, husband and wife architects and art aficionados who opened a private self-funded art museum in Heraklion and upon whose collection the article focuses.

In 2026 Papatznakis has a solo exhibition which has been mounted at "Mosaic Art Space" in Long Island City in Queens New York, titled "Unseen Brought to Light".
