= The Pupils =

Painting by Michaël Borremans

- Artist: Michaël Borremans
- Year: 2001
- Medium: Oil on canvas
- Dimensions: 70 cm × 60 cm (28 in × 24 in)

The Pupils is an oil on canvas painting made in 2001 by the Belgian Michaël Borremans. It depicts three young men, each looking down at an upturned head, with thin white lines between the eyes of the heads above and below. The title plays with the two meanings of the word pupil. Critics have described how the impression of The Pupils changes as the viewer discovers its details. They say it may reflect the relationship between the painting and viewer, it appears both familiar and incomprehensible, and it may be about self-doubt. It was shown at a Borremans exhibition held in Ghent, London, and Dublin in 2005.

== Subject and composition ==
The Pupils shows three young men in factory overalls, sitting or standing in a diagonal row. Each man looks alike and bends over an upturned head in front of him. Two of the men touch the faces of the heads as if studying them or applying something to them. The two foremost men have a thin, vertical white line stretching between one of his eyes and the head below. The area surrounding the heads is dark, and it is unclear if they are attached to bodies. Michaël Borremans made The Pupils in 2001.

== Analysis and reception ==
The title of The Pupils is originally in English and intentionally ambiguous, as it refers both to students and the pupils of the eyes. Aidan Dunne of The Irish Times says the young men first looked like "trainee optometrists", and The Guardian's Adrian Searle says he thought they were being trained in dentistry or cosmetic surgery before he spotted the thin lines, which he describes as "pure light or tears". The art historian and curator Ziba de Weck Ardalan says she thought they might be medical students before seeing that the heads below look identical to those of the pupils, who appear to be crying into the eyes below them. As the viewer discovers more details in the painting, Weck Ardalan says a number of possibilities arise: the three pupils could be one man from different angles, the subject of the painting might be "the human agony of self-doubt", and the men are perhaps looking or crying into their own images. Sam Steverlynck of De Standaard says they are creating replicas of their own heads.

Searle compares the lines between the eyes to the connection between the painting and its observers. He says The Pupils seems to depict work, is a work and makes the viewer work, and like many Borremans paintings has a both gentle and sinister atmosphere. Weck Ardalan sees the painting as an example of how Borremans uses balance and colour to create a sense of timelessness and nostalgia, reminiscent of old film stills, despite portraying unusual subjects. Although the techniques are similar, she differentiates Borremans' works from Romantic paintings because they do not focus on the feelings of the individual, but on existence in human society, the absurd in life within a complex world and the tension between the animate and the inanimate, inviting viewers to an irrational perspective. Weck Ardalan says The Pupils shows people engaged in an activity that appears both ordinary and incomprehensible. Steverlynck says Borremans paints with "an almost classical mastery". He says The Pupils is mysterious, hard to place in time and because of its "uneasy atmosphere, diluted with a hefty dash of absurdity, the work remains on your retina".

== Provenance ==
The Pupils was part of Borremans' solo exhibition The Performance, first held at the Stedelijk Museum voor Actuele Kunst in Ghent from 5 February to 17 April 2005. The Performance was then held at the Parasol Unit Foundation for Contemporary Art in London from 4 May to 30 June 2005 and the Royal Hibernian Academy in Dublin from 14 July to 4 September 2005. The Pupils was part of the group exhibition Eklips at Moderna Museet in Stockholm in 2008.
