= Eastbank Esplanade =

Pedestrian and bicycle path

Vera Katz Eastbank Esplanade
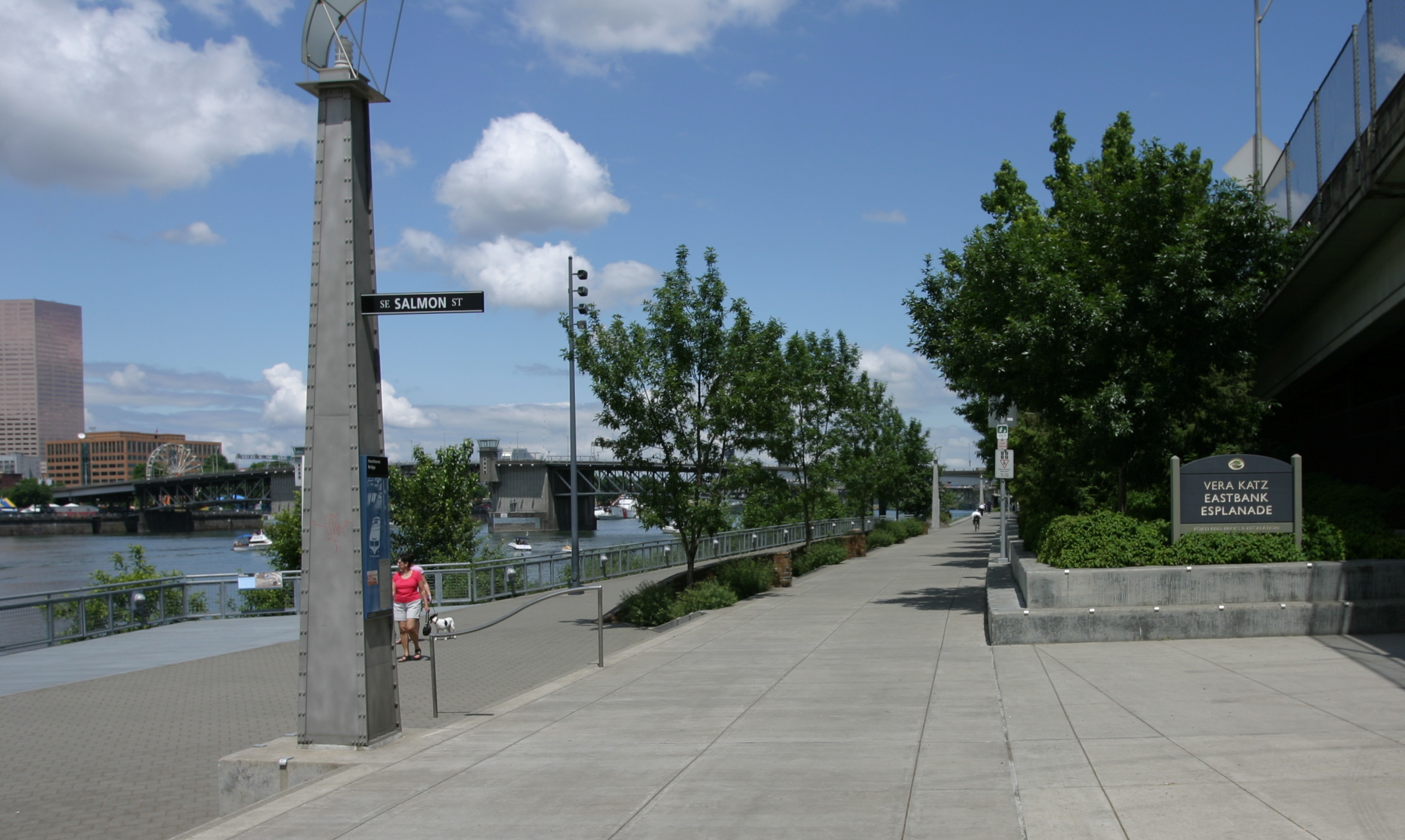
- Pedestrian path facing North towards the Burnside Bridge
- Interactive map of Vera Katz Eastbank Esplanade
- Location: SE Water Ave. and Hawthorne Blvd. Portland, Oregon
- Coordinates: 45.523718°N 122.666149°W
- Area: 10.69 acres (4.33 ha)
- Opened: 2001
- Owner: Portland Parks & Recreation

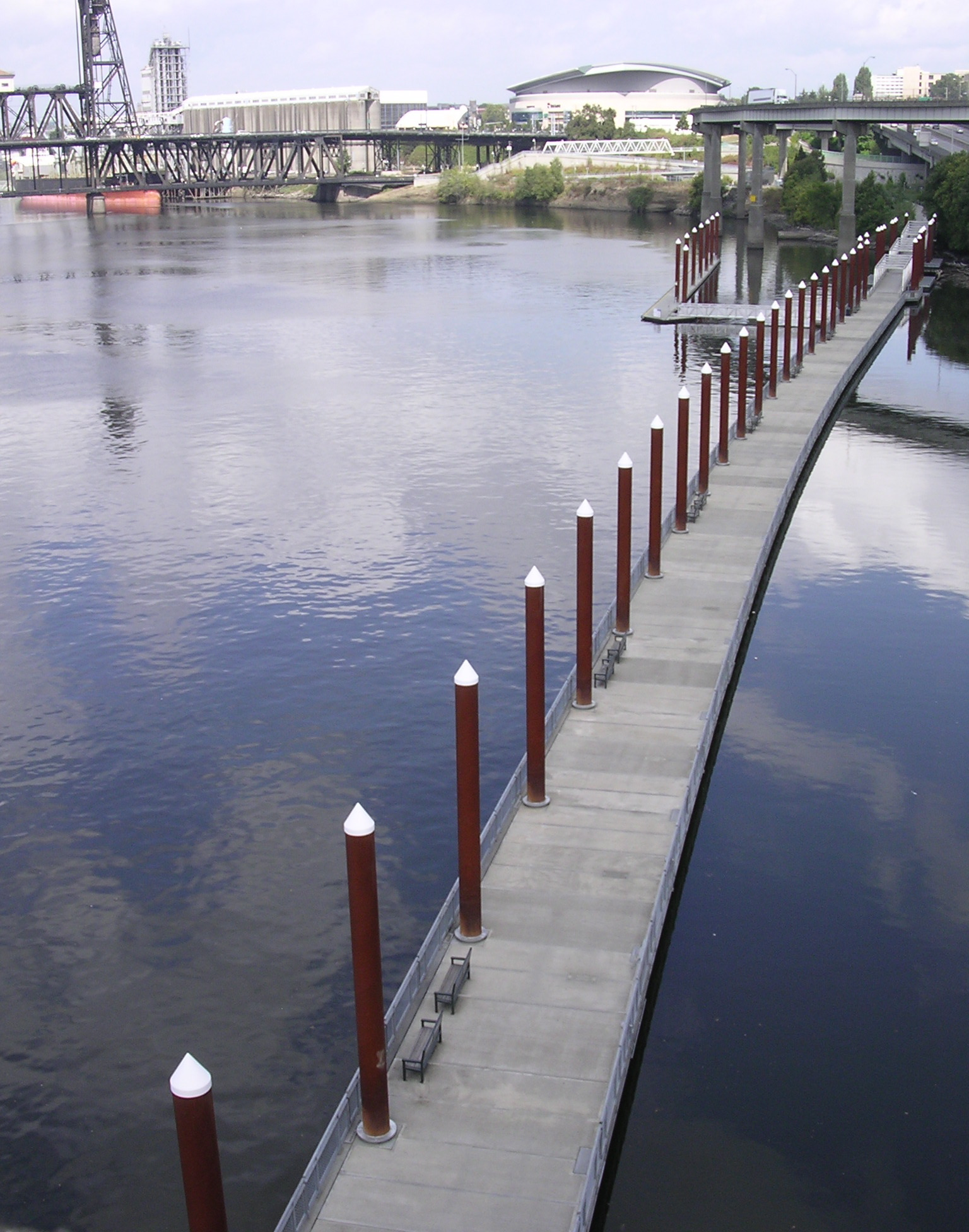
The esplanade's floating section

The Eastbank Esplanade (officially Vera Katz Eastbank Esplanade) is a pedestrian and bicycle path along the east shore of the Willamette River in Portland, Oregon, United States. Running through the Kerns, Buckman, and Hosford-Abernethy neighborhoods, it was conceived as an urban renewal project to rebuild the Interstate 5 bicycle bypass washed out by the Willamette Valley Flood of 1996. It was renamed for former Portland mayor Vera Katz in November 2004 and features a statue of her near the Hawthorne Bridge.

== Description ==
The project, designed by landscape architects Mayer/Reed, cost $30 million, of which $10 million built a lower deck on the Steel Bridge. The esplanade extends 1.5 miles (2.4 km) from the Steel Bridge (45.526871°N 122.670403°W) to the Hawthorne Bridge (45.512804°N 122.668059°W). The south end connects to the Springwater Corridor, a rail trail that runs south to Sellwood, then east to Gresham, then south to Boring. The esplanade includes a 1,200-foot (370 m) floating walkway, the longest of its kind in the United States. Connected to this is a 120-foot (37 m) public dock. Thirteen markers along the esplanade correspond to the eastside street grid.

== History ==
Construction began in October 1998, and the walkway was dedicated in May 2001.

The esplanade was closed for 21 days due to high river levels in 2011, the first time it had been closed since it was built.

On the same day in February 2015, two dead bodies were discovered along the esplanade. The events appear to be unrelated.

== Public art ==
Public artworks installed along the esplanade include Alluvial Wall, Echo Gate, the Ghost Ship sculpture, the statue of Vera Katz and Stack Stalk.

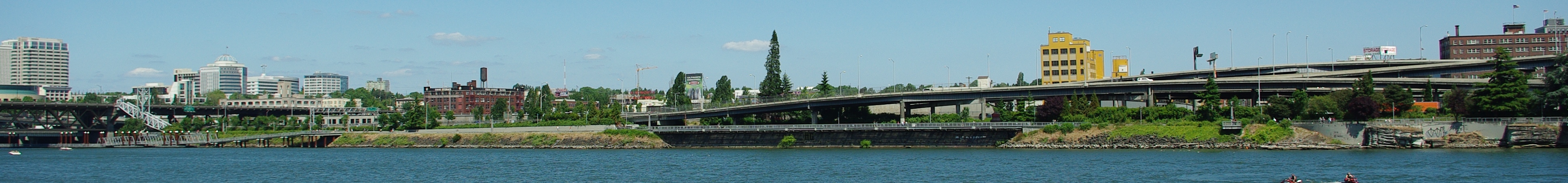
A large section of the esplanade

== See also ==
- Kevin Duckworth Memorial Dock
