= Rigga =

American group of artists and architects

Rigga, stylized as RIGGA, is a group of artists and architects based in Portland, Oregon.

== Works ==
- Alluvial Wall (2001)
- Echo Gate (2001)
- Ghost Ship (2001)
- Stack Stalk (2001)

== See also ==
- Lovejoy Columns
