= Ingvar Cronhammar =

Swedish-Danish sculptor (1947–2021)

- Born: 17 December 1947; Hässleholm
- Died: 20 May 2021 (aged 73)

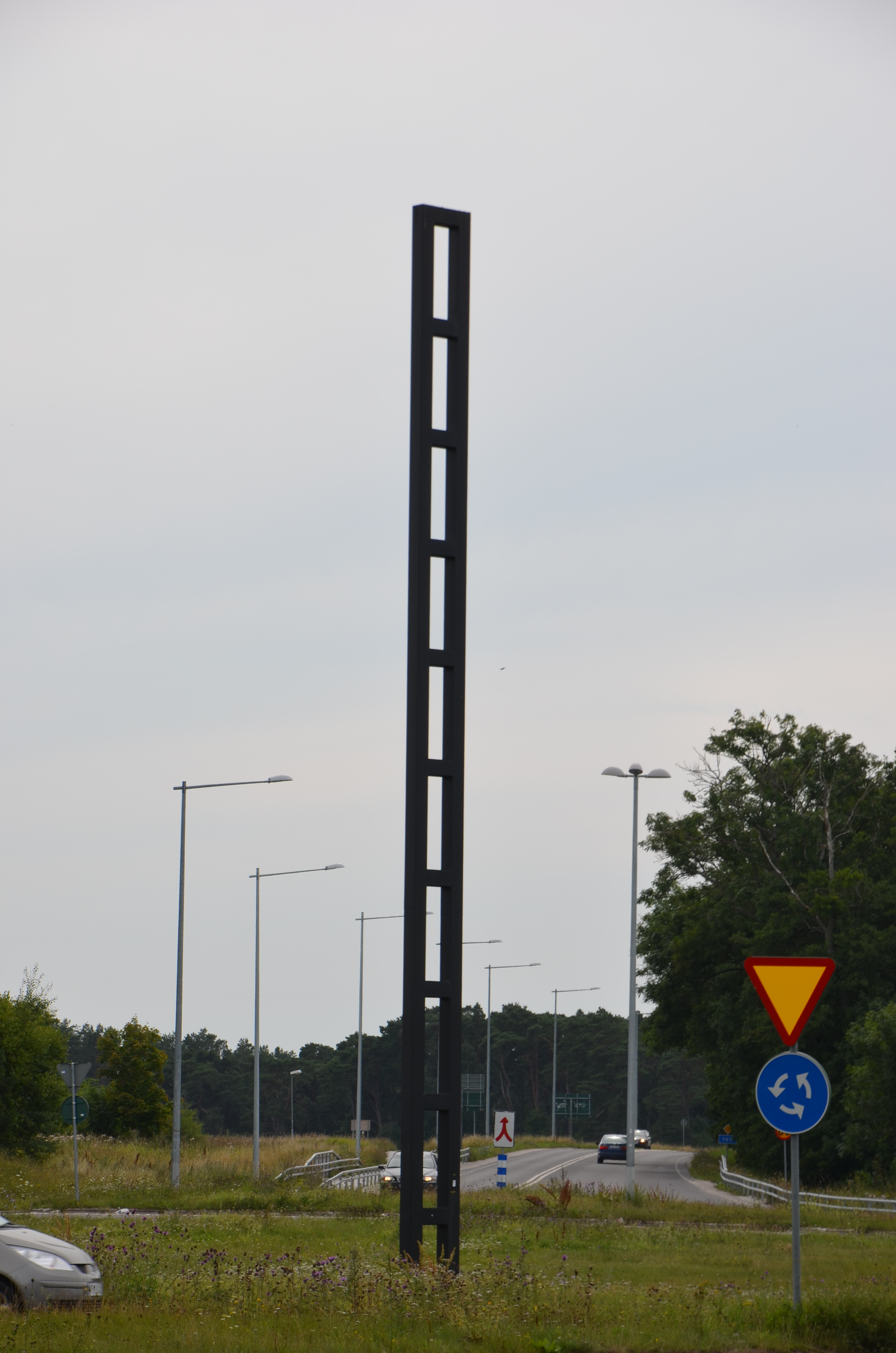
Ingvar Cronhammar: Omen (1993) in Visby, Sweden

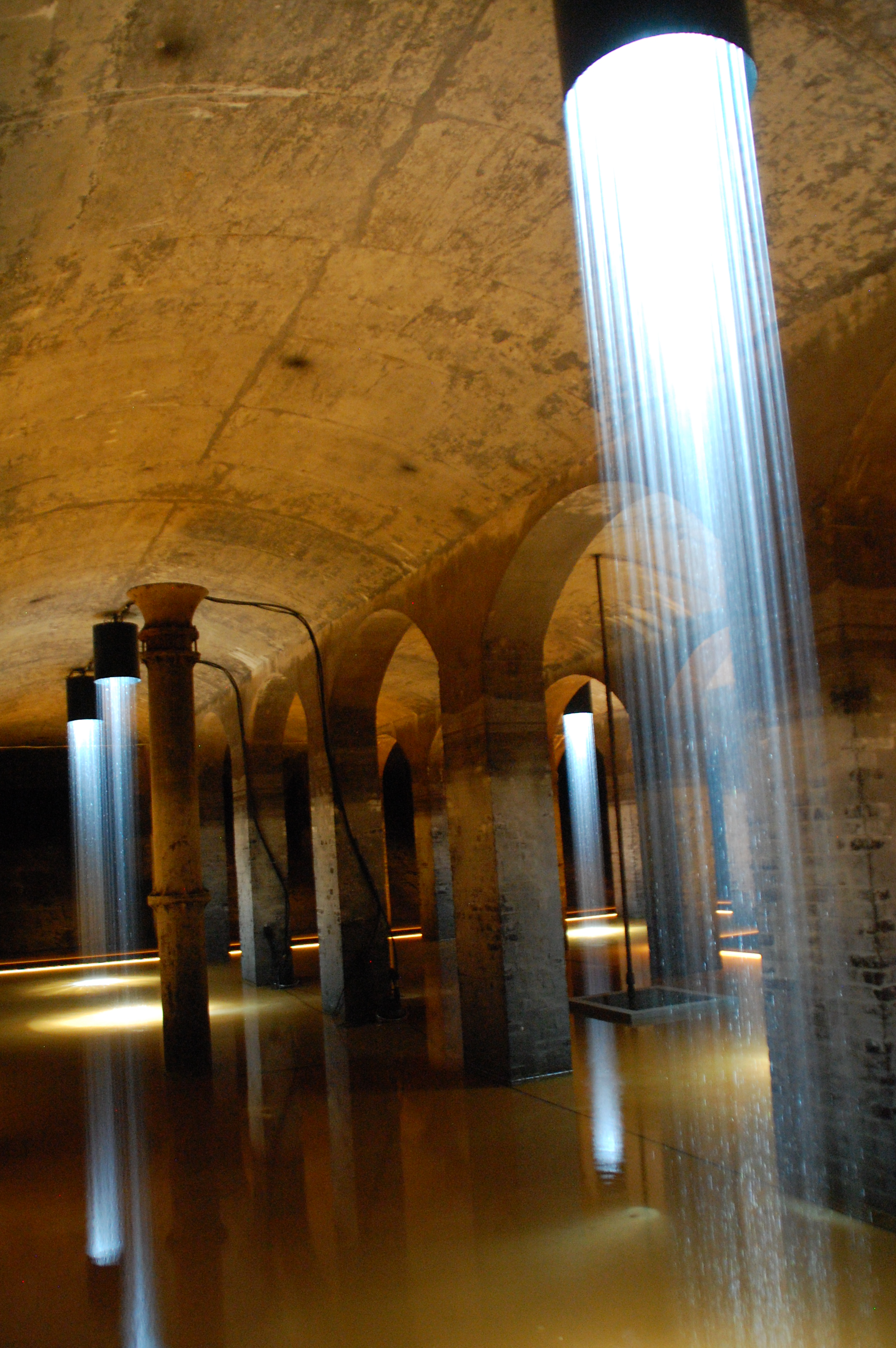
Installation in Frederiksberg/Denmark 2015.

Ingvar Cronhammar (17 December 1947 – 20 May 2021) was a Swedish-Danish sculptor, who lived in Denmark from 1965 until his death. He gained a unique place in Danish art with his dark monumental works, often presenting an eerie confrontation between modern technology and the primitive past.

== Biography ==
Born in Hässleholm in the south of Sweden, he moved to Denmark in 1965 where he studied at the Jutland Art Academy in Aarhus from 1967 to 1971. Until the early 1980s, inspired by environmental art from the United States, his spectacular works revealed his fascination with conflict and provocation and his contempt for convention. An early example was Koncert for en hjemmeværnsmand (Concert for the Home Guard, 1969) featuring live chickens with lamps strapped to their backs. In 1979, he presented chairs draped with pigskin and a parasol with swastikas.

Over the years, his works became increasingly larger, often with a sacred look, simultaneously inducing fascination and disgust. The Gate (1988) presents an infernal machine of steel, sound, light, and movement, representing a confrontation with death. The direct confrontation of work and nature is also apparent in his gigantic Elia (1989–2001) in Herning, conceived as a fire-spitting temple of dark steel. His fascination with machines also produced works with animal bones, bird wings and skin, juxtaposing nature with culture and creating visions combining primitive elements with modern technology.

Cronhammar stands alone in Danish culture with his huge monumental, machine-like works which he created with dark materials such as mahogany, steel. and rubber. They can be found both in museums and as public works across the country. The Herning Museum of Contemporary Art exhibits a large collection of his works.

He died on May 20, 2021, at the age of 73 from blood clots in his heart.

== Awards ==
In 1993, Cronhammar was awarded the Eckersberg Medal and, in 2003, the Thorvaldsen Medal. He was decorated a Knight of the Order of the Dannebrog in 2007.

== Literature ==
- Laugesen, Peter; Cronhammar, Ingvar (1992). Ingvar Cronhammar: et udvalg af billeder (in Danish). Fogtdal. ISBN 978-87-7248-253-8.
- Weirup, Torben; Cronhammar, Ingvar (2008). The Silence: A Narration about Ingvar Cronhammar (in Danish). Aristo. ISBN 978-87-91984-04-4.
