= Traditional Chinese Studies Institute =

2001 painting by Chen Danqing

- Artist: Chen Danqing
- Year: 2001
- Medium: Oil on canvas
- Dimensions: 187 cm × 223 cm (74 in × 88 in)

Traditional Chinese Studies Institute (Chinese: 国学研究院; pinyin: Guóxué yánjiù yuàn) is a 2001 oil painting by Chinese painter Chen Danqing. It portrays five masters of Chinese language and literature who taught at Tsinghua University, Zhao Yuanren, Liang Qichao, Wang Guowei, Chen Yinque and Wu Mi.

From 2000 to 2004, Chen was the professor at the Academy of Arts & Design, Tsinghua University. He created this painting in 2001 to celebrate the 90th anniversary of Tsinghua University's founding.

This painting was sold in 2007 in an auction in Beijing by Beijing Poly International Auction Co. for RMB¥13.44 million. In 2012, it was sold again for RMB¥20.7 million in an auction by China Guardian Auctions Co.
