= Statue of Miles Davis =

Monument in Kielce, Poland

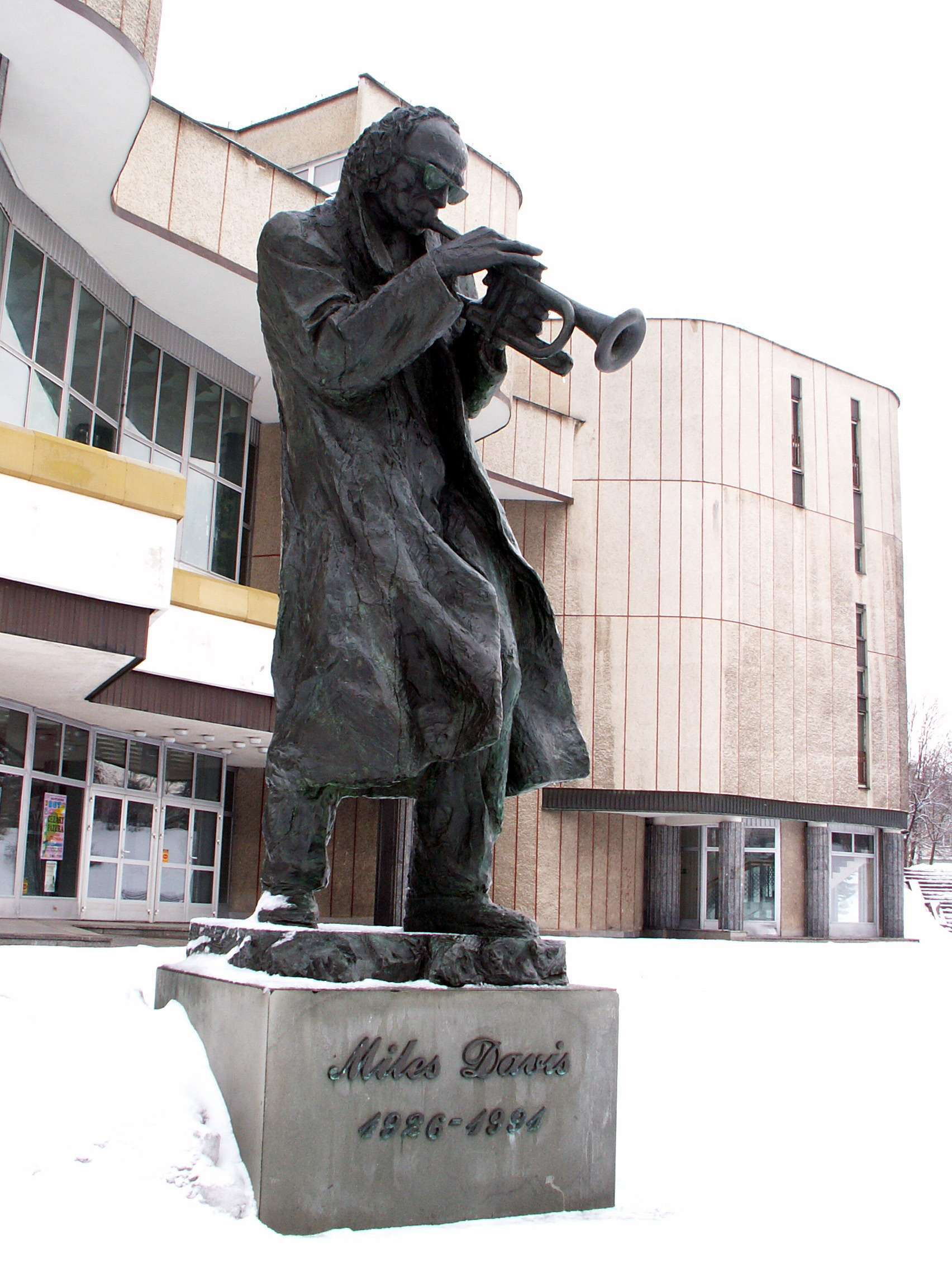
- The monument in 2006.
- Interactive map of Statue of Miles Davis
- Location: Moniuszko Square, Kielce, Poland
- Coordinates: 50.868389°N 20.636891°E
- Designer: Grzegorz Łagowski
- Type: Statue
- Material: bronze
- Height: 2.25 m (7 ft 5 in)
- Opening date: 28 September 2001
- Dedicated to: Miles Davis

The statue of Miles Davis (Polish: Pomnik Milesa Davisa) is a bronze statue in Kielce, Poland, placed at the Moniuszko Square. It is dedicated to Miles Davis, a jazz trumpeter, who was one of the most influential and acclaimed figures in the history of the genre and 20th-century music overall. The sculpture was designed by Grzegorz Łagowski, and unveiled on 28 September 2001.

== Description ==
The monument is placed at the Moniuszka Square, in front of the Kielce Cultural Centre. It is a bronze statue with the height of 2.25 m, depicting Miles Davis playing on a trumpeter, and wearing a trench coat and sunglasses. The sculpture is placed on a small pedestal.

== History ==
The monument was proposed by Kielecki Klub Jazzowy (Kielce Jazz Club), as part of the celebrations of the Kielce Jazz Festival Memorial to Miles, a music festival dedicated to Miles Davis, a jazz trumpeter, who was one of the most influential and acclaimed figures in the history of the genre and 20th-century music overall. It was designed by sculptor Grzegorz Łagowski, and unveiled on 28 September 2001, on the 10th anniversary of Davis's death. It was the first monument dedicated to him in the world.
