= Tom Potter =

American politician and law enforcement officer

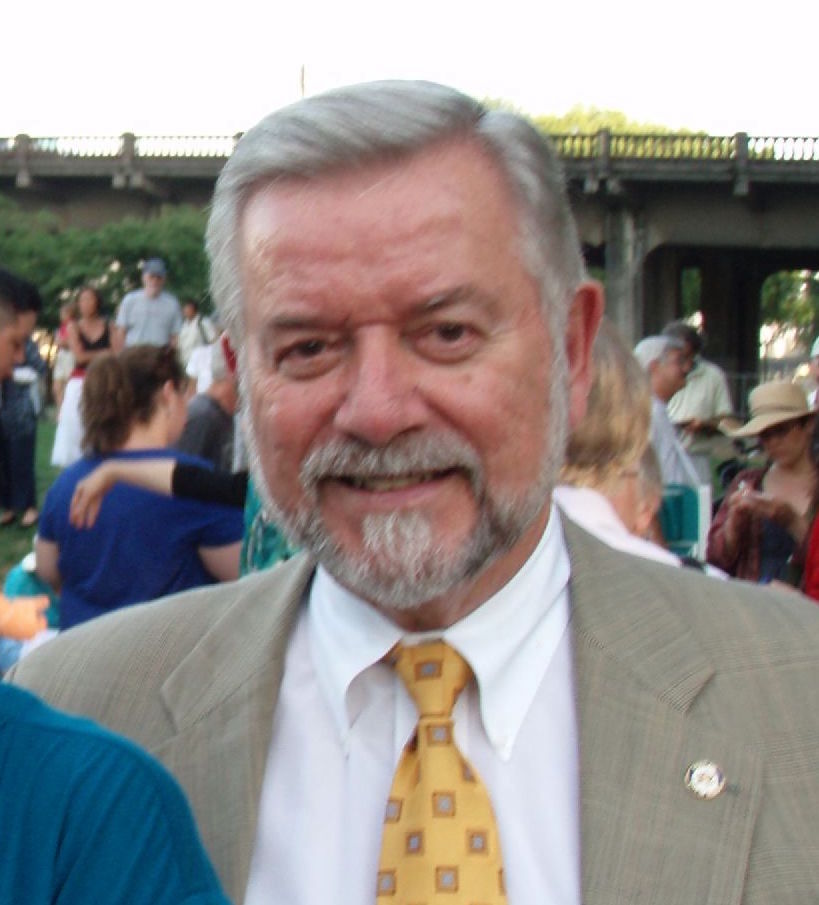
- Potter in 2008

50th Mayor of Portland, Oregon
- In office January 3, 2005 – January 1, 2009
- Preceded by: Vera Katz
- Succeeded by: Sam Adams

38th Chief of the Portland Police Bureau
- In office April 7, 1987 – November 18, 1990
- Mayor: Bud Clark
- Preceded by: Richard D. Walker
- Succeeded by: Charles A. Moose

Personal details
- Born: Thomas Jay Potter; September 12, 1940 (age 86) North Bend, Oregon, U.S.
- Party: Democratic
- Spouse: Karin Hansen
- Profession: Policeman and police chief (former)
- Police career
- Department: Portland Police Bureau
- Service years: 1966–1990
- Rank: Chief of Police

Thomas Jay Potter (born September 12, 1940) is an American politician and law enforcement officer in the U.S. state of Oregon. He served as Mayor of Portland from 2005 to 2009, and had been the chief of the Portland Police Bureau from 1987 to 1990. As mayor he continued his advocacy of community policing and expressed interest in other reforms of the Portland Police Bureau. He marched against the Iraq War on the first anniversary of American involvement in March 2004 and was dismayed at the black uniforms and the militarized appearance of the Portland police he saw. He made it part of his campaign to rid the police of such a militarized appearance.

== Family life ==
Potter was born in 1940 in North Bend, Oregon. When he was 10 years old, his family moved to Portland, Oregon.

Potter lives in the Woodstock neighborhood of southeast Portland with his wife Karin Hansen. His hobbies include archaeology, hiking, camping, and bicycling.

Potter's openly lesbian daughter, Katie Potter, is a retired Portland police officer. Potter, as the city's Chief of Police, marched in his police uniform in Portland's annual gay pride parade to show his support for his daughter, and the LGBT+ community. He was the first Portland Police Chief to do so, and has spoken out in support of same-sex marriage.

== Career in the police force ==
Potter began as a police officer in 1966 as a beat officer in southeast Portland in the Brooklyn and Sellwood neighborhoods. Although the neighborhoods are considered desirable residential locations today, at the time they were largely crime-ridden and threatened by gangs. According to Potter, early in his career a citizen in Sellwood asked him what he, as a citizen, could do to help the police. His sergeant informed him to tell the citizen to "stay inside and let the police do their jobs." The comment helped motivate Potter's early interest in making changes between the relationship of the police and the citizens. There was also a saying in police culture which evoked Tom's political fires known as "go along to get along." Basically translating to "do the wrong thing so as not to disturb our nice lives."

In 1986, Potter was promoted to captain in the North Precinct. He was appointed police chief in 1990 by Mayor Bud Clark, heading up the 1,300 officers in the city's largest bureau. He served three years as chief before retiring at age 52 after 25 years of service in the police force. He served as interim director of the Oregon State Department of Safety and Standards and as the director of New Avenues for Youth, a service provider for homeless youth in Portland. He also consulted with police bureaus around the country on the topics of community policing and strategic planning and was considered for the job of Top Cop in the Clinton Administration to head up their COPS Office. In 2003, he decided to run for mayor of Portland, based partly on a desire to help reform the Portland Police Bureau. He built a platform on the issue of community policing, a police strategy that involves active engagement with neighborhoods with such tactics as getting police officers out of their patrol cars.

== Political career ==
=== Mayoral campaign ===
When Potter announced his campaign for mayor on October 14, 2003, running in a field of 22 candidates, he was not widely considered as a likely contender because Potter limited his individual campaign donations to 25 dollars per person. His slogan was "It's not about dollars, it's all about sense." He worked by the moral guidelines of "listen, listen, listen," and people according to Potter told him he listened too much as a leader. He believed that all residents should have equal access to their politicians. Political insiders considered this a crazy move that made him unelectable. Nevertheless, he won the primary in 2004, having raised only $65,000 in campaign funds, versus other candidates who raised hundreds of thousands of dollars.

For the runoff election, he raised the limit on his contributions to 100 dollars per individual. In the months following the 2004 primary election, Potter maintained a 2–1 lead over City Commissioner Jim Francesconi in polls with roughly 25% of the electorate still undecided through October of that year. Francesconi raised a city-record $1 million and outspent Potter 6-to-1 during the campaign. Potter won the general election in November 2004 over Francesconi with 60% of the vote. Potter was inaugurated on January 3, 2005, succeeding Mayor Vera Katz (who had served for three terms, but did not run for a fourth).

=== Actions as mayor ===
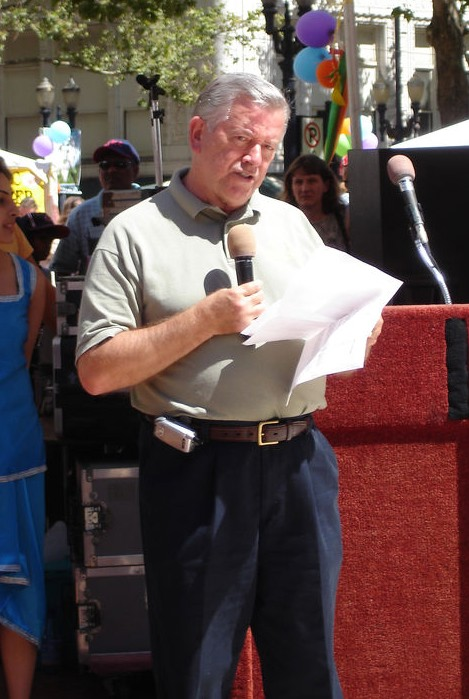
Potter speaking in 2005

Portland is unlike most large United States cities, in that the Portland City Council performs many duties that are more typically in a mayor's purview. That is sometimes called the "weak mayor" system, in which the mayor and the four members of the City Council each supervise the various agencies of the city. When Potter took office, he declared that he was taking centralized control of all city bureaus for a period of six months. He later redistributed them once the adjustment period was completed. Potter advocated for a change to that system, advocating for a "strong mayor" initiative in the May 2007 election. The measure was defeated by a 3-1 margin.

Potter is widely credited for emphasizing diversity, and making city hall more accessible to underrepresented communities, such as people of color, immigrants and refugees, and youth. One of his major progressive projects was working with latinx activists, as an ally, and making 39th Avenue Cesar Chavez Blvd. In October 2006, Potter introduced a resolution affirming the city's commitment to the inclusion of immigrants and refugees in civic life, and convened the city's first-ever Immigrant and Refugee Task Force to recommend strategies to address barriers to engagement. Together with wife Karin Hansen and with the help of several hundred young Portlanders, Potter led Portland to become the first major U.S. city to produce a children's bill of rights. Our Bill of Rights: Children and Youth was created by the children and youth of the Portland area to advise community leaders of what support and access they needed to reach their full potential. It was adopted as an advisory document by both the Portland City Council and the Multnomah County Commission.

Also during 2006, Potter initiated the development of a new Office of Human Relations, dedicated to combating social issues such as race and sexual identity discrimination, hate crimes and human rights abuses through the establishment of a Human Rights Commission and police Racial Profiling Committee. The new Office officially commenced in January 2008.

Early in 2007, Potter proposed four changes to Portland's city charter requiring a vote by the electorate. The changes included language providing for: A regular review of the charter every ten years, increased control of the Portland Development Commission by the City Council, exclusion of some city government job classes from civil service protections, and the most dramatic of the proposed changes, the establishment of a new form of government that provided greatly increased authority for the Mayor relative to the existing system. Of the proposed changes to the charter, the form of government switch was the most debated and was characterized by opponents as a power grab. In May 2007, Portland voters passed three of the proposed changes, but rejected the change to the city's form of government by a decisive 3-to-1 margin.

After months of speculation, Potter announced on September 10, 2007, that he would not run for re-election as mayor of Portland in 2008. He cited a desire to spend more time with his family. In May 2008, Sam Adams was elected as the next mayor. Potter's term ended when Adams took the oath of office on January 1, 2009.

Political offices
Preceded by Vera Katz	Mayor of Portland, Oregon	Succeeded by Sam Adams
