= Parasol Unit Foundation for Contemporary Art =

British charity and art gallery

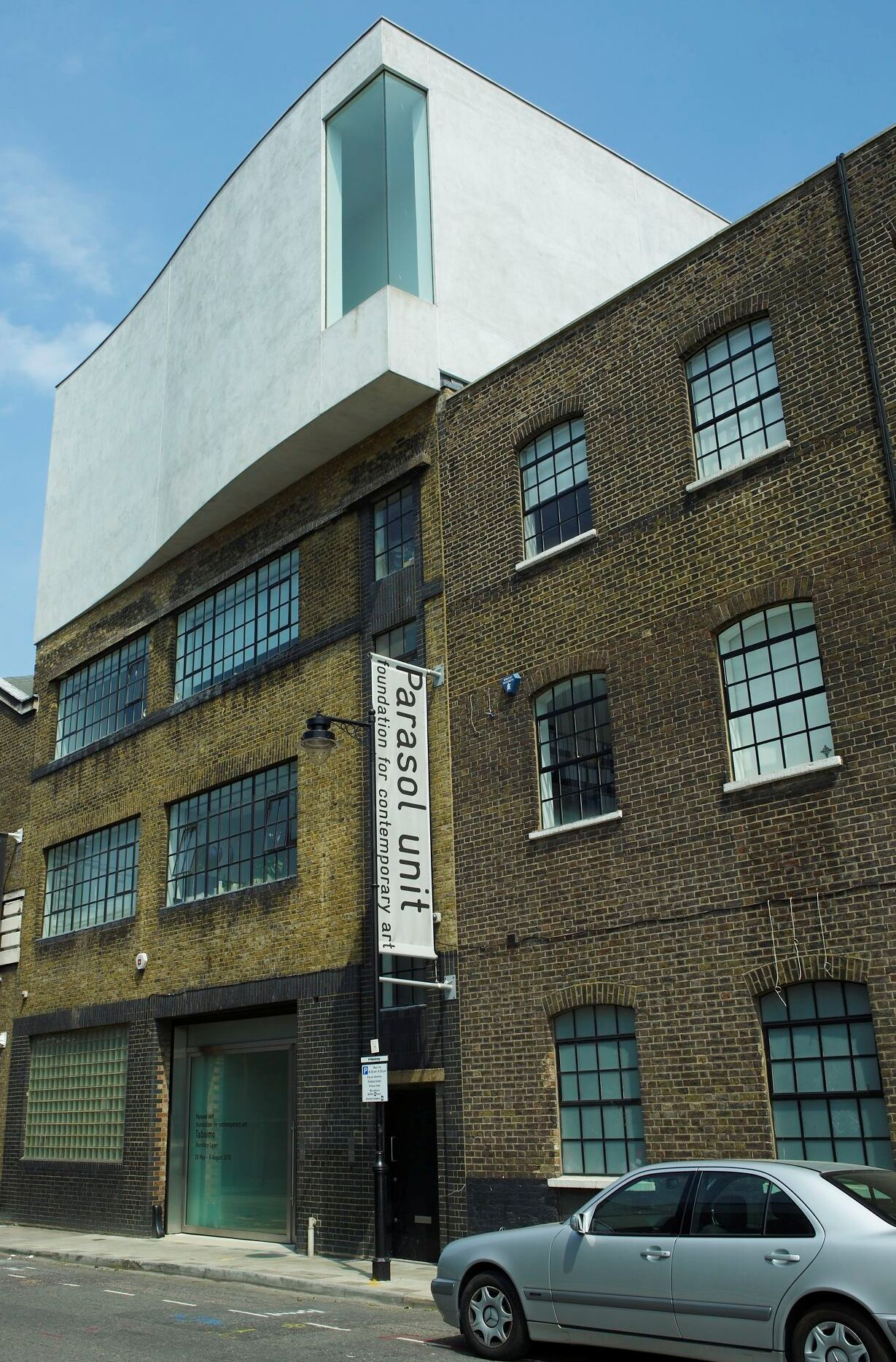

- Location within Central London
- Established: 2004
- Location: 14 Wharf Road, London N1, England, United Kingdom
- Coordinates: 51.5302°N 0.095°W
- Director: Ziba Ardalan
- Public transit access: Old Street tube, Angel tube
- Website: www.parasol-unit.org

The Parasol Unit Foundation for Contemporary Art is a not-for-profit arts organisation established in 2004.

Parasol Unit was established by its director and curator, Ziba Ardalan. A graduate in the History of Art from Columbia University New York, Ardalan worked as Guest Curator at the Whitney Museum of American Art. She guest curated the exhibition 'Winslow Homer and the New England Coast' at the Whitney's Stamford, Ct. Branch (1984). Ardalan became the first Director/Curator of New York City's Swiss Institute in 1987, before moving to Zurich, Switzerland, and then relocating to UK and founding Parasol Unit. She has curated numerous exhibitions and has also lectured and written about art. Prior to her career in art, Ardalan obtained a Ph.D. in physical chemistry.

== Gallery ==
The foundation previously owned a gallery space which was privately owned and was put at the disposal of the foundation at no charge. However, since 2020 the gallery has been closed.

== Selected exhibitions ==
Exhibitions include The Performance in 2005 by Michaël Borremans, No Snow on the Broken Bridge in 2006 by Yang Fudong, Momentary Momentum: Animated Drawings with work by Francis Alÿs, William Kentridge, and David Shrigley, Fire Under Snow in 2008 by Darren Almond, Silent Warriors in 2010 by Adel Abdessemed, The Time That Remains in 2010 by David Claerbout and Morgenland in 2017 by Elger Esser.

== Images of the Gallery ==
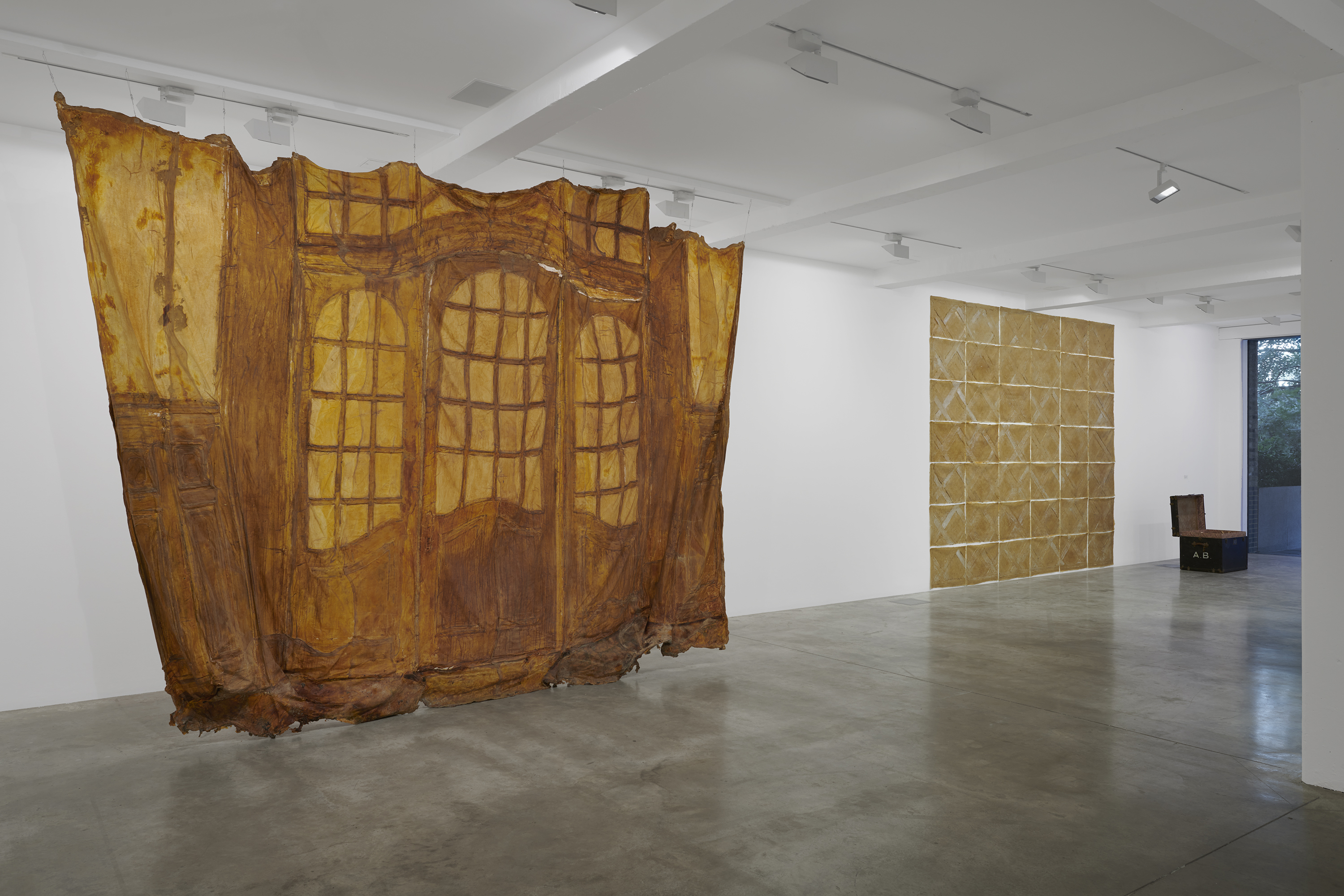
Heidi Bucher installation

== See also ==
- Victoria Miro Gallery located next door
