= Elia (sculpture) =

Public artwork in Herning, Denmark

Coordinates: 56°07′38″N 9°01′37″E

Elia is a sculpture created by Ingvar Cronhammar (1947–2021) in Herning, Denmark. It is a large, spherical dome with four columns reaching 32 meters (105 ft). The dome itself has a diameter of 60 meters (200 ft). A large tube located in the center of the sculpture randomly blasts flames 8 meters (26 ft) into the air, for about 25 seconds at a time. These random bursts can occur anytime in periods of about two months and will not occur if it is too windy or if people are too close. The work was inaugurated in September 2001 and cost 23 million Danish krone.

Flames were last seen from the sculpture on October 22 2022.

== Accidents ==
On 30 October 2016 a 21-year-old man died by falling down the center. 2 months later, on 29 December 2016, a woman died the same way, purportedly committing suicide by jumping into the centre chamber. This ultimately resulted in the sculpture getting a safety net installed. In connection with the installation of the net, an installer fell several meters down and subsequently had to be taken to hospital by ambulance. On 23 March 2021, a 46-year-old man died in one of the four steel pipes while performing maintenance on the sculpture.

== Dimensions and materials ==
The sculpture has the following dimensions and material use:

Measure	Meter
Diameter at ground level	60.00
Height above ground level (pillars)	32.00
Height to upper platform	11.22
Radius in the steel dome	42.00
Radius at bottom	110.8
Staircase width	10.00
Step height	0.34

Materials	Amount
Steel sheeting	270 t
Structural steel	80 t
Steel pillars	30 t
Concrete	250 m³
Asphalt	300 t
Reinforcement steel	15 t
Volume of earth excavated	7,000 m³
Terrain regulation	20,000 m³ earth
