= Chen Danqing =

Chinese-American artist, writer and art critic

- Born: August 11, 1953 (age 73); Shanghai, China
- Citizenship: Republic of China
- Education: China Central Academy of Fine Arts, Art Students League of New York, Tsinghua University
- Writing career
- Genre: Painting
- Subject: Tibetan Paintings

Chinese name
- Traditional Chinese: 陳丹青
- Simplified Chinese: 陈丹青
Transcriptions
Standard Mandarin
- Hanyu Pinyin: Chén Dānqīng

Chen Danqing (born 11 August 1953 in Shanghai, China) is a Chinese-American artist, writer, and art critic. He started as a self-taught painter and later obtain a master degree from China Central Academy of Fine Arts. He gained nation wide recognition during the 1980s for his realist paintings of the Tibetans. He moved to the US in 1982 and spent 18 years there as a professional painter. He returned to China in 2000 and lectured at Tsinghua University before resigning in 2004. He published several essay collections and hosted documentary series Local Perspective introducing art to the general public.

== Life and career ==
Chen Danqing was born in Shanghai with family roots in Taishan, Guangdong province. He began learning oil painting through self‑instruction at around age seventeen, when he was sent to the countryside as a sent‑down youth. In 1968, he acquainted himself with young artists including Xia Baoyuan and Chen Yifei, who he looked up to as a role model and mentor in art. He moved to the United States in 1982 and became a US citizen in 1994. As his grandfather moved to Taiwan with the Nationalist government, he once obtained a passport with Republic of China and re-entered Mainland China as a citizen of Republic of China (Taiwan).

=== Education and early career ===
In the 1970s, after he graduated from secondary school at the age of 16, he was forced to go to the countryside of southern Ganzhou. In the spring of 1975, with the help of Chen Yifei, he moved to the suburbs of Nanjing and settled down there. During this period, his completed works include Writing a Letter to Chairman Mao (a painting that expresses the aspiration of youths to stay in rural area), and Tibetan themed painting Tears Flooding the Autumnal Fields, together with a number of oil paintings and Lianhuanhua works on the topic of Chinese Civil War. Well known within the artistic community, his sketches were imitated by his peers.

With the restoration of the National Higher Education Entrance Examination in 1978 after the ending of the Cultural Revolution, Chen Danqing was admitted to the oil paintings department of China Central Academy of Fine Arts as a graduate student. He stayed and taught at the school after his graduation in 1980. In the same year, his graduation work, the Tibetans paintings (西藏组画), a series of seven realist oil paintings, earned Chen a nation-wide fame "almost overnight".

=== Moving to the United States ===
In 1982, Chen moved to New York City and lived there for 18 years writing and painting. Chen was represented exclusively by Wally Findlay Galleries in New York, Palm Beach, Beverly Hills and Paris.

=== Returning to China ===
Chen returned to China in 2000 as a professor and doctoral supervisor at Tsinghua University, Academy of Arts & Design. In October 2004, after publicly criticizing the school’s rigid admissions and curricula, he resigned from Tsinghua University.

Chen has published several essay collections including Random Notes from New York (纽约琐记, 2000), Chen's Music Notes (陈丹青音乐笔记, 2002), The Excess Material (多余的素材, 2003), Backward Steps (退步集, 2004), Backward Steps Continued (退步集续编, 2007), and The Wasted Years (荒废集, 2009). Chen participated in the 2008 Beijing Olympic Games opening ceremony as part of Zhang Yimou's design team.

== Notable works ==
Chen is well known for his Realist paintings and garnered critical acclaim for his portraits of Tibetans.

=== Tibetan paintings ===
In 1976 and 1980 Chen traveled to Tibet for a total of nine months. The trip to Tibet inspired him to make a number of paintings about the ethnic minorities of the nation, including his 1976 painting Tears Flooding the Autumnal Fields, and a series of seven paintings for his graduation portfolio, later collectively known as the Tibetans paintings or the Tibetan series (西藏组画). These paintings are: Mother and Child, Pilgrimage, One City, Shepherd, City of the Two, Shampoo, and Kamba Man.

The 1978 Exhibition of Nineteenth-Century French Rural Landscapes at the National Art Museum of China—which included works by Camille Corot, Courbet, Jean-François Millet, Monet, Gauguin, Derain, and Renoir, seemed to have a substantial impact on Chen. It was the first large-scale French art exhibition in the People's Republic of China, offering Chinese artists a close encounter with academic European realism. Inspired by the small-scale canvases in that show, Chen chose to paint his Tibetan Series on similarly modest surfaces, in contrast to the monumental “grand scenes” typical in Chinese painting at the time. In his graduation thesis accompanying the Tibetan Series, Chen cited influence and his admiration for European painters Rembrandt, Camille Corot, Jean-Francois Millet, and Arkady Plastov, for their refined and humanistic portrayals of everyday life with emotional depth. He portrayed the Tibetans in a dignified, forthright way, avoiding the patronizing depictions of ethnic minorities common at the time.

The Tibetans paintings signaled a shift from propaganda‑driven Social Realism to a modern realist style influenced by nineteenth‑century European Realism artists. This series redirected focuses from Soviet‑inspired realism to classical European realism within Chinese oil painting, portraying everyday life in an earthy, sober, and unheroic manner.

The Tibetans paintings were considered an important milestone in the turning of China's artistic landscape in the early 1980s amid the Reform and opening up. At the Beijing Poly 2021 Spring Auction, one of the paintings titled Shepherds was sold at a price of RMB 161 million (approx. USD 22 million). This painting shows the moment of a kiss between two Tibetan shepherds, an intimate theme rarely explored during that era. The Tibetans paintings remains Chen 's most iconic body of work. While it established his fame, it also seemed to have haunted his career—frequently cited by critics as his creative peak.

=== 1990s and onwards ===
After the Tiananmen Square protests of 1989, Chen developed a series of large‑scale diptychs and triptychs that blend realist history painting with installation‑style presentation. He conceived “copying” as a self‑standing visual language, arranging paired panels—each linking a Tiananmen image with scenes drawn from mass media or art history—to create open‐ended juxtapositions. Works such as the 1991 diptych Street Theater guide the viewer through matched compositional elements (vanishing points, mirrored gestures, selective color accents) to evoke themes of upheaval, nationalism, and historical uncertainty. Although rooted in nineteenth‑century European realism, these installations recall monumental works like Géricault’s Raft of the Medusa and Rembrandt’s The Night Watch, while engaging late‑twentieth‑century themes of appropriation, media‑mediated memory, and the “angel of history” concept popularized by Walter Benjamin.

In 1995, Chen completed Still Life, a ten‑panel installation each 2 meters high and together spanning 15 meters in length. Although entitled Still Life, the work’s scale, linked‑panel format and thematic complexity align it with contemporary installation practice rather than traditional tabletop still‑life painting.

2010, Yang Feiyun and Chen Danqing planned two major art exhibitions – "Back to the Sketch (回到写生)," and "In the Face of the Original Code (回向原典)".

=== Local Perspective ===
Local Perspective (局部, jubu) is a Chinese documentary series hosted by Chen Danqing and co‑produced by Vistopia (看理想, kanlixiang) and Youku. Seasons one (2015) and two (2018) together garnered over 110 million views and Douban ratings of 9.5 and 9.4.

The third season, The Great Artisans — Italian Renaissance Frescoes, premiered on January 8, 2020, and was the most extensively prepared. In 2017, Chen spent three months in Florence researching churches and monasteries. In 2018, he recapped his knowledge on Renaissance art history, and spent more than ten days to writing each episode’s script. In 2019, the production team secured permissions to film on location at dozens of religious sites in Italy.

The season spotlights Renaissance fresco artists often overshadowed by Leonardo da Vinci, Raphael, and Michelangelo — Giotto, Masolino da Panicale, Paolo Uccello, Filippo Lippi, Filippino Lippi, and many more anonymous artisans — asserting that the Renaissance’s scope cannot be measured by its most celebrated names alone. Through close study of fresco cycles at the Basilica of Saint Francis in Assisi, Santa Maria della Scala in Siena, and the Medici‑Riccardi Chapel in Florence, the series restores these artists to prominence and reveals the cultural richness of a medium often confined to the margins. Leaving out specialist jargon, the program unfolds in Chen’s personal voice, augmented by modern filming techniques and diverse visual materials under director Xie Mengxi and a team of young filmmakers. Writer Jiang Fangzhou praised Chen’s sincerity in presenting art for its own sake. At the Beijing launch, Chen recalled his years in remote countryside—when art reached him only by chance—and affirmed his wish to make art appreciation accessible on every smartphone. Published in 2020 as The Great Artisans — Italian Renaissance Frescoes, the scripts include Chen’s travel photographs and reflective annotations.

== Exhibitions and curations ==
=== Group exhibition ===
- Army Art Exhibition ("march into Tibet," China Art Museum, Beijing 1977)
- National Art Exhibition ("Tears shaman harvest field" China Art Museum, Beijing 1977)
- Central Academy of Fine Arts Graduate Exhibition ("Tibet group painting" CAFA Art Museum, Beijing 1980)
- People's Republic of China Art Exhibition (Spring Salon in Paris, France 1982)
- Chinese Contemporary Art Exhibition (Wally Findlay Galleries, New York, USA · 1982)
- Group Show (Santa Ana Los Angeles Museum of Contemporary Art · USA 1987)
- China Five Thousand Years of Civilization Art Exhibition (Columbia Guggenheim Museum of Modern Art in New York · 1998)
- Twentieth Century Neoclassical Retrospective (Museum of Modern Art · Belgium Wusi Deng 2001)
- China Dialogue Exhibition of Contemporary German Art (Du Du Fort Museum of Modern Art · Germany Myers 2002)
- The Original Image II · Contemporary Works on Paper Exhibition (Yibo Gallery, Shanghai 2003)
- Art and War (Graz, Graz, Austria, 2003 Art Museum)
- Feel · Memory (Yibo Gallery, Shanghai 2004)
- Century Spirit · Chinese Contemporary Art Masters (Millennium Art Museum, Beijing 2004)
- Art and China's Revolution (Asia Society, New York, 2008 Art Museum)
- Doran 5 years · Chinese Contemporary Art Retrospective (Shanghai Duolun Museum of Modern Art · 2008)
- Very status · Chinese Contemporary Art Exhibition of Twelve Masters (Wall Art Museum, Beijing 2009)
- Chinese Painting Exhibition of artists of the twentieth century (China National Grand Theater, Beijing 2009)
- Original Song 2011 Summer Exhibition (original song Gallery, Shanghai 2011)
- Khe Qingyuan · Chinese New Painting (Louise Blouin Foundation · London 2010)
- Thirty Years of Chinese Contemporary Art History · Painting articles (Minsheng Art Museum · Shanghai 2010)
- Transformation of Chinese History, Art 2000–2009 (National Convention Center, Beijing 2010)
- Spirit and History (National Exhibition Tour 2010)
- 2010 Offshore Oil Painting · Sculpture Exhibition of Famous (Museum of Contemporary Art · Shanghai Zhangjiang 2010)
- Track and Qualitative · Beijing Film Academy 60th Anniversary Exhibition (Space Art Gallery, Beijing 2010)
- Youth · Youth Narrative Painting Exhibition (Shanghai Art Museum Shanghai 2010)
- Love and Hope – Support Japan affected children (Iberia Center for Contemporary Art, Beijing 2011)
- Visual Memory (Shanghai Art Museum Shanghai 2012)
- Four Decades of Stories · Time Friendship Art (Shanghai, Nanchang 2012)
- Integrate the New Extension – Returned Overseas Artists Painting Exhibition (Beijing World Art Museum, Beijing 2012)
- Group Jane Meta · National Ten Art Museum Exhibition (China Art Museum, Beijing 2013)
- The 55th Venice Biennale · Parallel Exhibition "Heart Beat" (Venice, Italy · 2013)

=== Solo exhibition ===
- Chen Danqing Exhibition My Paintings and Tibet (Wally Findlay Galleries, New York · United States)
- Chen Danqing Exhibition (Wally Findlay Galleries, Beverly Hills · USA)
- Chen Danqing Oil Painting Exhibition (Sun Yat-sen Memorial Hall in Taipei · 1995)
- Chen Danqing Exhibition (Hong Kong University of Science and Technology, Hong Kong Arts Centre · 1998)
- Chen Danqing 1968–1999 Sketch Painting Exhibition (Beijing, Guangzhou, Wuhan, Shenyang, Nanjing Shanghai 2000)
- Chen Danqing Print Exhibition (Miki International Art, Beijing 2010)
- Chen Danqing Returned Years (Chinese Painting Academy, Beijing 2010)

=== Curatorial ===
- Back to Painting (Museum of China, Beijing)
- In the Face of the Original Code (Chinese Painting Academy, Beijing)
- Shanghai Notepad · 1960 Photo Exhibition (Today Art Museum, Beijing)
- Tracer One Hundred Bridge Picture Show (Suzhou Museum Suzhou)

==== Collections ====
- Military Museum of the Chinese Revolution
- Jiangsu Provincial Art Museum
- China Art Gallery
- Central Academy of Fine Arts
- Harvard University
- Wally Findlay Galleries International, Inc.
- Europe, the Americas, Asia dozens of agencies, collectors

==== Publications and prints ====
- Traditional Chinese Studies Institute (2001)
- Chen Danqing Sketch
- Chen Danqing Sketch Collection (Tianjin People's Fine Arts Publishing House)
- Chen Danqing Paintings (Chinese University of Hong Kong)
- Chen Danqing Album · Still Life (Hong Kong University of Science and Arts Centre)
- Chen Danqing Sketch Collection (Guangxi Fine Arts Publishing House)
- Chen Danqing 1968–1999 Sketch Painting Collection (Hebei Education Press)
- Chen Danqing Contemporary Artists Series (Sichuan Fine Arts Publishing House)
- Chen Danqing Returned a Decade Painting Sketch (Guangxi Normal University Press)
- Chen Danqing Sketch Painting (Zhejiang People's Fine Arts Publishing House)
