= Janet Goldner =

American artist

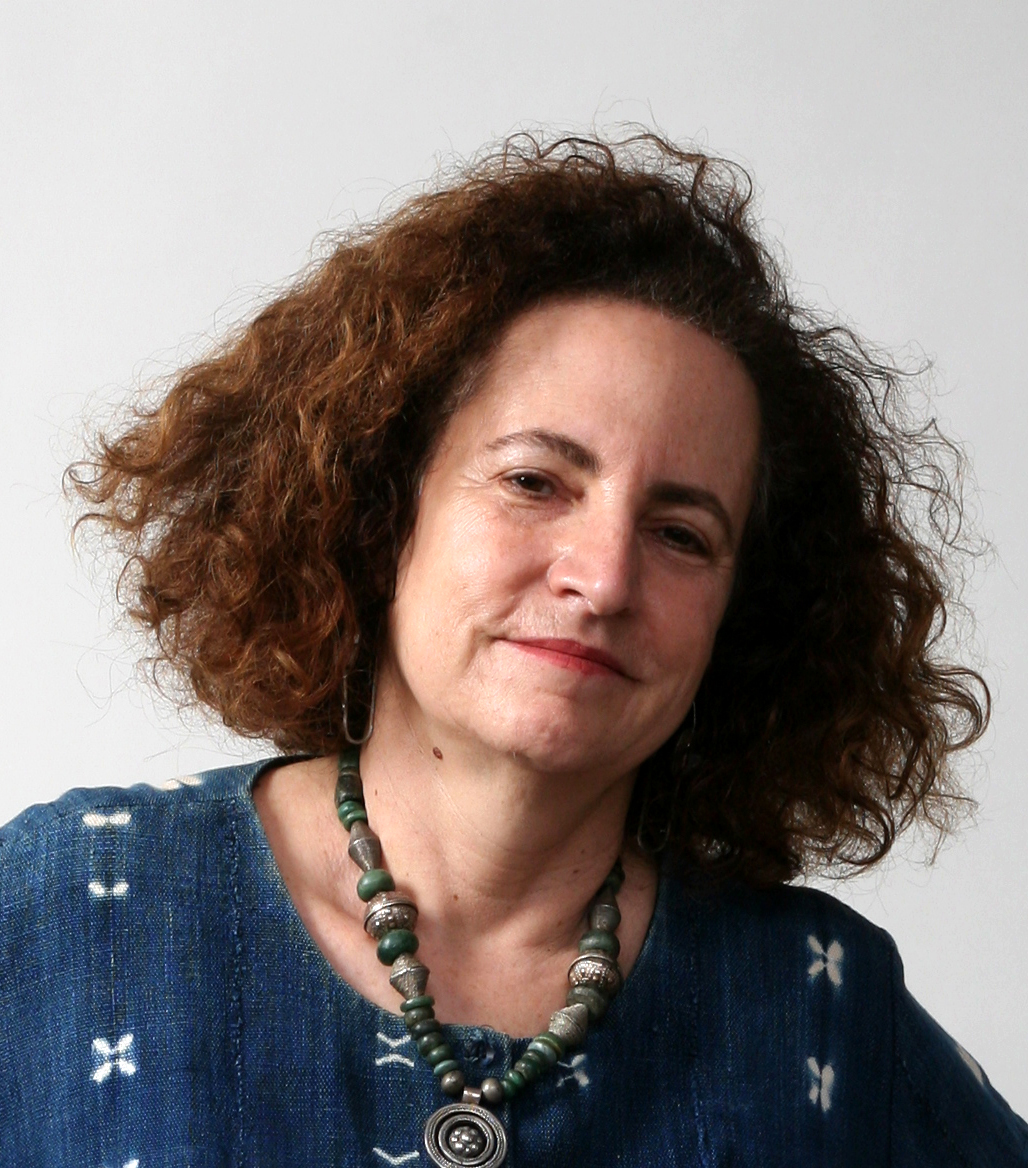
- Born: Janet Goldner; 1952 (age 72–73); Washington D.C.
- Known for: Photography, installation, sculpture
- Website: http://janetgoldner.com

Janet Goldner is an American visual artist who has exhibited her work widely on four continents. Goldner spends several months in Mali each year and lives and maintains a studio in New York City. She has received numerous awards and grants, and her work is in several collections.

== Work ==
Goldner's work bridges diverse cultures, and addresses issues of social justice and identity. Her work has been influenced by numerous trips to West Africa, and Mali in particular. Her work was included in the Global Africa exhibition at the Museum of Art and Design, curated by Lowery Stokes Sims. Her Fences & Neighbors installation created on Governor's Island, in New York addresses border issues and migration.

== Honors and awards ==
In 1994-1995, Goldner received a Fulbright Senior Research Fellowship to Mali, as well as grants from the Ford Foundation, and UN Special Committee Against Apartheid.

== Collections ==
Goldner's work is in the permanent collections of the American Embassy in Mali, the city of Segou, Mali, and the Islip Museum in Long Island, NY. Her work, Most of Us Art Immigrants, a large-scale sculpture installation, is in the collection of the Islip Museum on Long Island, New York.
