= Michaël Borremans =

Belgian painter and filmmaker (born 1963)

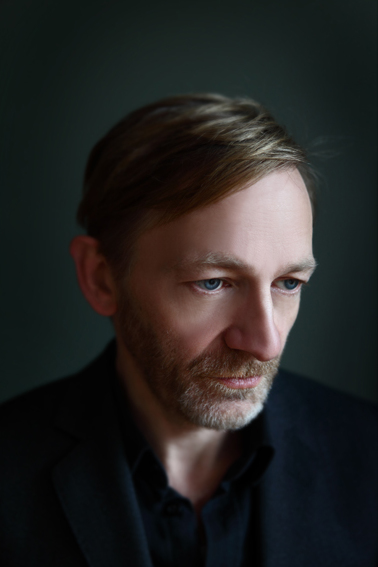
- Michaël Borremans
- Born: 1963 (age 62–63); Geraardsbergen, Belgium
- Known for: Painting

Michaël Borremans (born 1963) is a Belgian painter and filmmaker who lives and works in Ghent. His painting technique draws on 18th-century art, as well as the works of Édouard Manet and Degas. The artist also cites the Spanish court painter Diego Velázquez as an important influence. In recent years, he has been using photographs he has made himself or made-to-order sculptures as the basis for his paintings.

== Early life and education ==
Borremans studied at the Sint-Lucas Hogeschool voor Wetenschap en Kunst (College of Arts and Sciences St. Lucas) in Ghent, receiving his M.F.A. in 1996.

== Career ==
Originally trained as a photographer, he turned his attention to drawing and painting in the mid-nineties. He uses old photographs of people and landscapes as inspiration for his work.

Until his break-through, he was a teacher at the Stedelijk Secundair Kunstinstituut Gent (Secondary Municipal Art Institute of Ghent). Another painter Jan Van Imschoot had seen and bought many pieces of his work when it was exhibited in his local pub in Kalken. He put him in touch with Jan Hoet, the founder of the S.M.A.K. (Stedelijk Museum voor Actuele Kunst) (City Museum for Contemporary Art) in Ghent, Belgium. This led to an introduction to Frank Demaegd, owner of Zeno X Gallery in Antwerp, where he had his first major exhibition.

In November 2022, Borremans' book As Sweet as It Gets (2014) was featured in the background of an advertising image from the fashion brand Balenciaga. The image was part of a campaign that drew heavy criticism for material in other images alluding to the sexualisation of children. The inclusion of Borremans' book led to many people on Twitter creating connections between the campaign and Borremans' works, and criticising his paintings, such as the series Fire from the Sun (2018), which show blood-covered toddlers playing in fire and what appear to be human limbs.

== Exhibitions and projects ==
In 2011, Borremans' work was the subject of a solo exhibition, titled Eating the Beard, which was first on view at Württembergischer Kunstverein Stuttgart in Germany and traveled to Műcsarnok Kunsthalle, Budapest, and Kunsthalle Helsinki in Finland. In 2010, he had a solo exhibition at the Kunstnernes Hus in Oslo, and in 2009, he had a solo show at the Kestnergesellschaft in Hanover, Germany In 2007, he had a solo show at gallery De Appel in Amsterdam, focusing on his cinematic works. In 2005, he had a one-person exhibition of paintings and drawings at the Stedelijk Museum voor Actuele Kunst (S.M.A.K.), Ghent. The paintings then traveled to Parasol unit foundation for contemporary art, London, and The Royal Hibernian Academy, Dublin, while the drawings traveled to the Cleveland Museum of Art in Ohio. Other solo exhibitions include La maison rouge, Paris (2006); Kunsthalle Bremerhaven, Bremerhaven, Germany; and the Museum für Gegenwartskunst, Basel, Switzerland (both 2004). In 2004, he participated in Manifesta 5, The European Biennial of Contemporary Art.

Michaël Borremans: Fixture, was presented at the Centro de Arte Contemporáneo de Málaga in 2015–2016. A major museum survey, Michaël Borremans: As sweet as it gets, which included one hundred works from the past two decades, was on view at the Palais des Beaux-Arts in Brussels in 2014. The exhibition traveled later in the year to the Tel Aviv Museum of Art, followed by the Dallas Museum of Art in 2015. Michaël Borremans: The Advantage, the artist's first museum solo show in Japan, was also on view in 2014 at the Hara Museum of Contemporary Art, Tokyo.

In 2018, Borremans had a solo exhibition in Hong Kong titled Fire from the Sun. The gallery, David Zwirner, described the works as featuring "toddlers engaged in playful but mysterious acts with sinister overtones and insinuations of violence." In her review, Kartya Tylevich said, "The children are all light-skinned Sistine-style cherubs, sometimes covered in blood. The children do not appear to be distressed or disturbed (though some viewers at the gallery may be)."

== Art market ==
Borremans is the most expensive living Belgian painter in the art market. His highest selling painting was Girl with Duck (2011), which sold for £2,045,000 ($3,165,660), at Sotheby's London, on 15 October 2015.

== Other activities ==
In 2024, Borremans starred in Luca Guadagnino‘s Queer.

== See also ==
- The Angel (painting)
- The Pupils
