= Vera Katz =

American politician

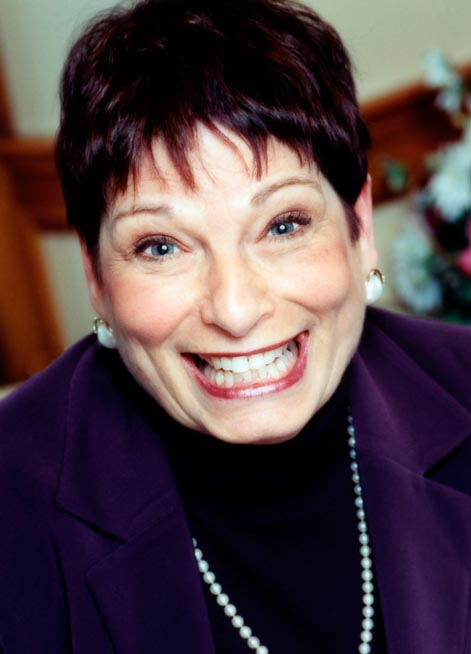

49th Mayor of Portland, Oregon
- In office January 3, 1993 – January 3, 2005
- Preceded by: Bud Clark
- Succeeded by: Tom Potter

57th Speaker of the Oregon House of Representatives
- In office January 14, 1985 – November 10, 1990
- Preceded by: Grattan Kerans
- Succeeded by: Larry Campbell

Member of the Oregon House of Representatives
- In office 1973–1990
- Constituency: Multnomah County

Personal details
- Born: Vera Pistrak; August 3, 1933 Düsseldorf, Germany
- Died: December 11, 2017 (aged 84) Portland, Oregon, U.S.
- Cause of death: Leukemia
- Party: Democratic
- Spouse: Mel Katz (m. 1964; div. 1985)
- Children: 1
- Profession: Politician

Vera Katz (née Pistrak; August 3, 1933 – December 11, 2017) was an American Democratic politician in the state of Oregon. She was the first woman to serve as Speaker of the Oregon House of Representatives and was the 49th mayor of Portland, Oregon's most populous city. She grew up in New York City, moving to Portland in 1962, and was elected to the Oregon House in 1972. She served as mayor from 1993 to 2005.

== Early life ==
Vera Katz was born on August 3, 1933, as Vera Pistrak in Düsseldorf, Germany. Her parents, Elizar ("Lazar Michael Pistrak"; 1896–1985) and Raissa (1896–1986), fled Moscow, Russia, after the Bolshevik Revolution in 1917, settling in Germany. As Jewish Mensheviks, the family, including Vera's elder sister, Senaida ("Zena"; born March 5, 1925), fled for France when Vera was two months old as Adolf Hitler and the Nazi Party rose to power.

Once World War II began and Hitler invaded France, the family of four fled over the Pyrenees Mountains to Spain on foot. After a time the family was able to emigrate to the United States, sailing on the ship Nea Hellas in 1940. They settled in Brooklyn. Vera's parents later divorced when she was 12 years old, and her mother was known as Raissa Goodman for the remainder of her life.

=== Education ===
Katz earned a Bachelor of Arts degree from Brooklyn College in 1955 and a Master of Arts degree in 1957. She worked as a camp counselor in upstate New York where she met her future husband, Mel Katz, a waiter and artist. They moved to Portland, Oregon, in 1962 after selecting Portland from a list that included Seattle, Philadelphia, and San Francisco.

After they moved, she gave birth to a son, Jesse. Jesse went on to graduate from Lincoln High School in 1981 and became a journalist in Los Angeles; his memoir, The Opposite Field, was published in October 2009.

== Early political activities ==
Katz became involved in politics in the late 1960s while working on the presidential campaign of Robert F. Kennedy. Kennedy had antagonized many in Portland through his aggressive pursuit of local corruption as United States Attorney General. Katz moved on to support the nationwide grape boycott organized in the late 1960s by Cesar Chavez to support migrant agricultural workers. She then protested and picketed the City Club of Portland over their male-only membership requirement in the early 1970s, leading to the end of the practice by the private club.

== Political career ==
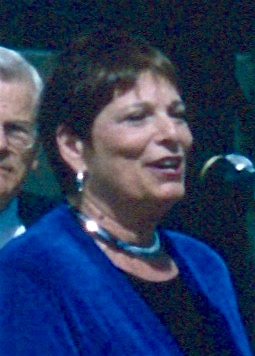
Katz speaking in 1997

In 1972, Vera Katz was elected to the Oregon House of Representatives as a Democrat representing Portland and Multnomah County for the 1973 session. She won re-election to additional two-year terms through 1990.

In 1985, she became the first woman to serve as Speaker of the Oregon House, replacing Grattan Kerans. While in the Oregon House, she sponsored the Oregon Educational Act for the 21st Century, a landmark school reform bill. She also helped pass measures on gun control as well as legislation prohibiting discrimination based on gender in places of public accommodation and credit. Katz was the first person in Oregon history to hold the position of Speaker for three straight sessions.

=== Mayor of Portland ===
In 1992, Katz ran for mayor of Portland, promoting her candidacy by using public transportation to commute to her office. Running against then city commissioner Earl Blumenauer, she campaigned on a platform that included reducing crime rates. She won the election and served three terms, from January 1993 until January 2005, winning re-election in 1996 and 2000.

During her first term, Mayor Katz endorsed the Yellow Bike Project, which drew national attention to Portland's artistic and bike-friendly civic engagement culture. In 2004, she did not run for re-election and Tom Potter was elected as mayor in November 2004, assuming office in January 2005. During her administration, Katz pursued a policy of revitalization of the city's neighborhoods.

Katz fought off the early stages of breast cancer in early 2000, with surgery and radiation treatment. Katz was subsequently diagnosed with a rare form of uterine cancer called adenosarcoma in June 2004, following a hysterectomy. While her cancer was beaten, treatment of her uterine cancer damaged Katz's kidneys and she subsequently was forced to undergo kidney dialysis three times a week for the rest of her life.

== Later years ==
Vera and Mel Katz divorced in 1985; their son, Jesse, went on to a career in journalism.

In January 2005, the former mayor began an unpaid position as a Dean's Visiting Fellow in the College of Urban and Public Affairs' Institute of Portland Metropolitan Studies at Portland State University. From 2008 until her death in 2017, she volunteered for the Start Making A Reader Today literacy program in the Portland area.

In her final job, which she began in 2008, Katz worked as a lobbyist for the public relations firm Gallatin Public Affairs. Despite limited mobility in her declining years, Katz would remain with the firm until her retirement in 2012.

== Death and legacy ==
Katz died peacefully in her sleep around 4 am on December 11, 2017, in Portland one week after being diagnosed with leukemia. She was 84 years old at the time of her death. Katz was survived by her son, Jesse Katz, a Los Angeles journalist; her grandson Max Katz; her former husband, Mel Katz; and her elder sister, Zena Linden.

At the time of her death, Katz was eulogized in an editorial in the Portland Oregonian, which declared:

During her three terms as mayor from 1992 to 2004, Katz altered the shape, look and dynamism of the city, helping to put it right up there with Brooklyn as a magnet for young people. She worked night and day on Portland, as feverishly if she were touching up her personal masterpiece and, in many ways, she was.

Katz was remembered as a detail-oriented and energetic public servant. She was instrumental in the development of a multi-use pathway, now known as the Vera Katz Eastbank Esplanade, a 1.5-mile-long (2.4 km) river walk 30 feet above the Willamette River which runs from the Hawthorne Bridge to the Steel Bridge and is part of the Portland Parks system. The Esplanade, construction of which was completed in May 2001, was named for Katz in November 2004 in honor of her civic achievement. A bronze statue of Katz by sculptor Bill Bane was added to the project in 2006.

== See also ==
- Timeline of Portland, 1990s–2000s
- List of female speakers of legislatures in the United States
- List of Oregon Legislative Assemblies

Preceded by Bud Clark	Mayor of Portland, Oregon; 1992-2005	Succeeded by Tom Potter
