= Travel Portland =

Destination marketing organization in Portland, Oregon, U.S.

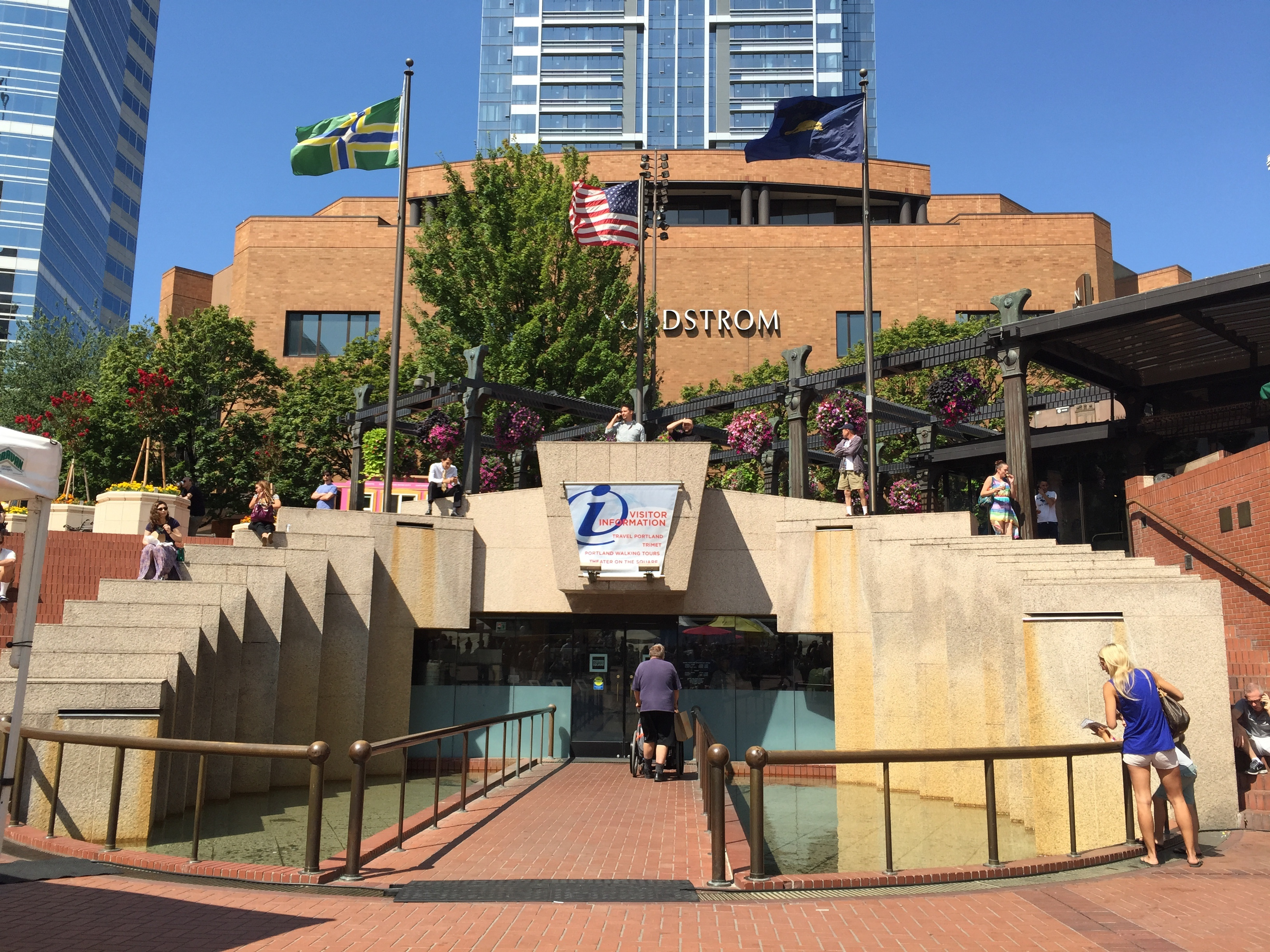
- Travel Portland's presence at Pioneer Courthouse Square in 2015

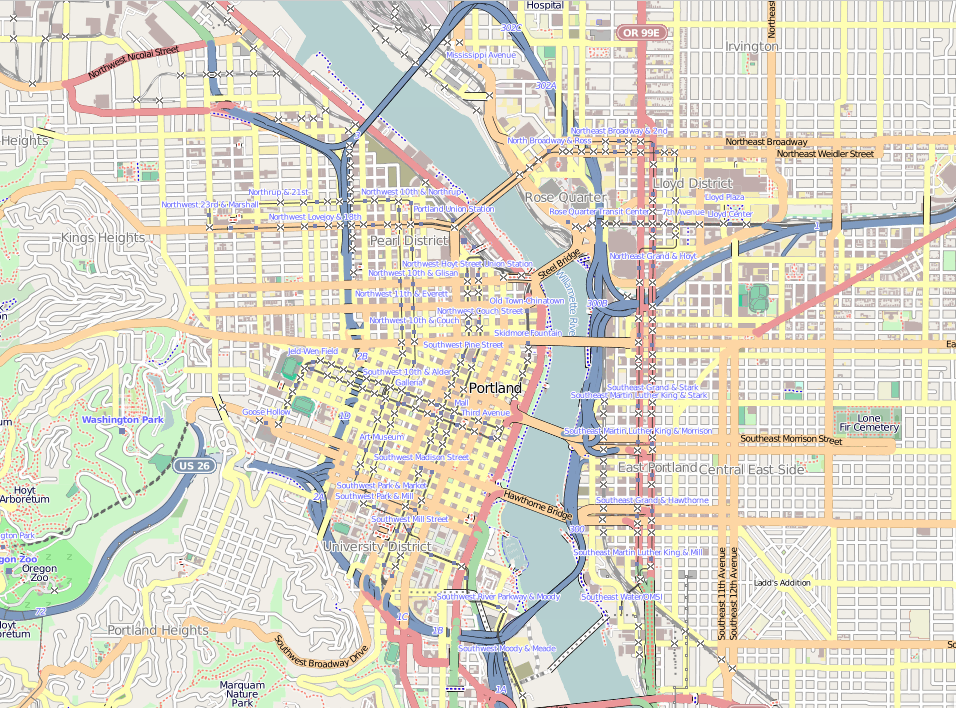
- Location in downtown Portland, Oregon
- Formation: 1978; 48 years ago
- Type: Nonprofit; destination marketing organization
- Headquarters: 100 Southwest Main Street, Suite 1100
- Location: Portland, Oregon, U.S.
- Coordinates: 45.5148°N 122.6755°W
- Region served: Portland, Oregon, U.S.
- CEO and President: Megan Conway
- Budget: $30 million (2024)
- Staff: 72 (2024)
- Website: travelportland.com
- Formerly called: Portland Oregon Visitors Association

Travel Portland, formerly the Portland Oregon Visitors Association, is a destination marketing organization in Portland, Oregon, United States. Established in 1978, it is a private, nonprofit organization and the largest destination marketing organization in Oregon. Travel Portland has operated visitor centers at Pioneer Courthouse Square and Director Park in downtown Portland, and has an office in the First & Main building.

Travel Portland's tourism campaigns have featured the nation's largest free-standing cuckoo clock, stop motion and other animated videos, and Mr. Dude, a Bigfoot-like mascot to market the city to Japanese tourists. The organization has also offered dining promotions and funded beautification projects such as murals and other art installations throughout the city.

== History ==
The private, nonprofit organization was established in 1978. In 1992, The Oregonian said the Portland Oregon Visitors Association (POVA) was "contracted by the city of Portland to market and promote tourism and conventions in the city" and "recruits conventions by calling organizations and making information on Portland-area services available".

POVA filed a lawsuit against the Oregon Convention and Visitors Services Network in 1992, "alleging that the sound-alike names were causing confusion and costing the association money by intercepting business intended for the association". POVA had approximately 1,000 members in 1998.

In September 2001, the computer worm known as Nimda disabled POVA's servers for less than 48 hours, temporarily limiting employee access to email and stored files. In 2004, POVA received a Governor's Film Advocate of the Year award as part of the Oregon State Film and Video Office's Industry Leaders Awards.

POVA became known as Travel Portland in January 2008. The rebrand included a new logo and website redesign. In 2011, Travel Portland was among the nation's only tourism organizations with a public relations manager "dedicated solely to promoting environmentally responsible travel", according to Fodor's.

Oregon Business said in 2024, "Travel Portland's budget is made up of 1% of Portland's tourism tax revenue as well as a 3% hotel tax and a $4 million contract with the convention center. Funded as it is by tourism dollars, the organization's fortunes rise and fall with the crowds. Prior to the pandemic, Travel Portland employed 76 people with a budget of $30 million. COVID cut those figures to 38 employees and a $8.5 million budget. The budget's now back at $30 million with 72 staff members."

=== Leadership ===
In 1998, Judy Rice was the "immediate past" chair of the board of directors. In 2000, Brian McCartin was the chair. Pat LaCrosse was elected chair for 2000–2001. In 2002, Craig Thompson was a past chair, Suzanne Miller was the chair, and Brad Hutton was chair-elect.

Tom Kennedy was the organization's director in 1982. Charles Ahlers was the executive director in 1991–1992. Richard Ransome was a director and past president in 1993. Gary Grimmer was the executive director in 1995. Sho Dozono and Bruce Fery have been the organization's presidents.

Joe D'Alessandro was Travel Portland's president and chief executive officer (CEO) from 1996 to 2006. According to the Bay Area Reporter, he is believed to be the nation's first openly gay man to lead a visitors bureau. Carol J. Lentz was an interim president in 2006, until Jeff Miller was selected in October. He held the president and CEO role until late 2024. Megan Conway became the CEO and president on January 1, 2025.

=== Visitor centers and offices ===
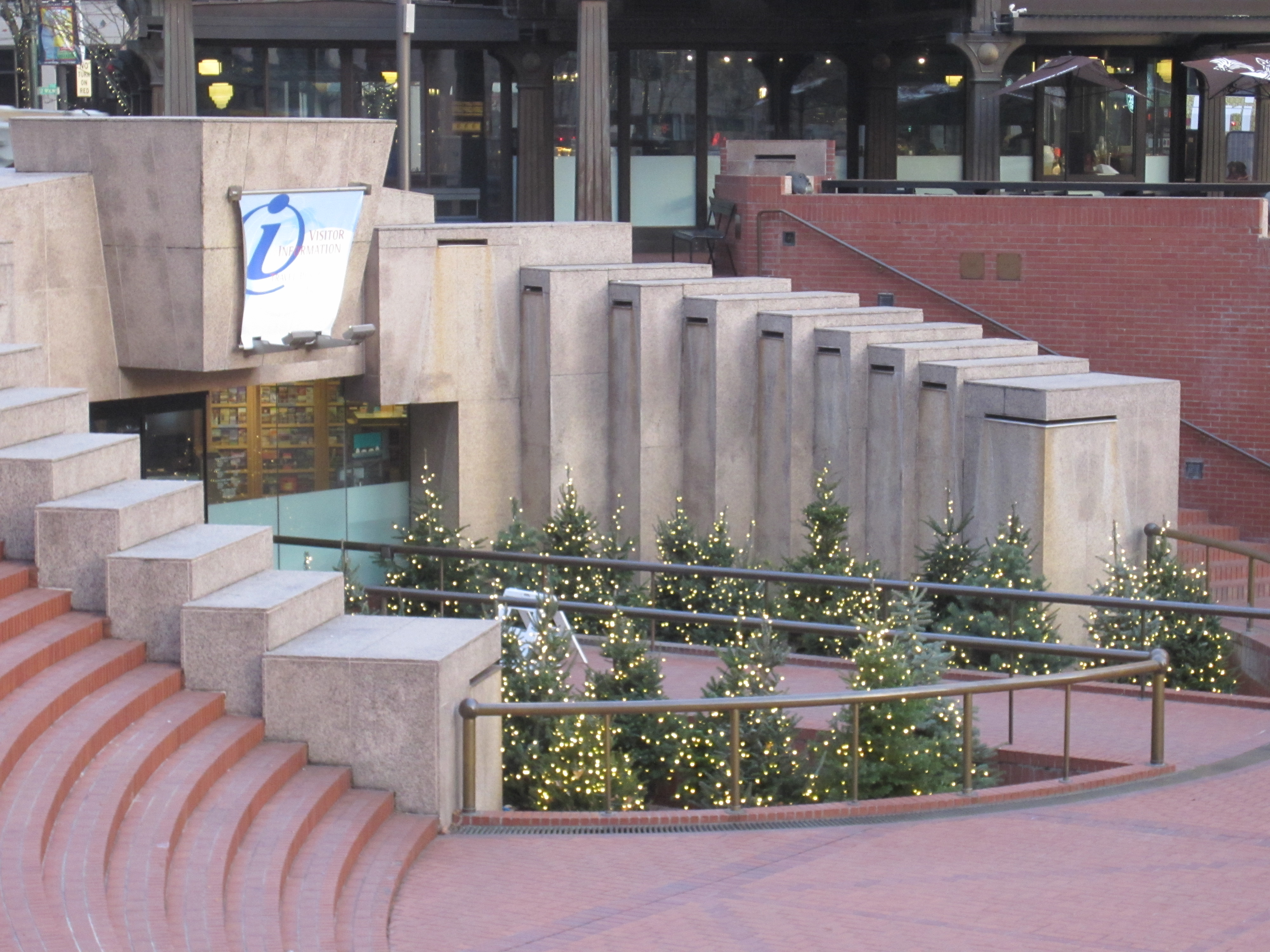
Entrance to the visitor center in the lobby of Pioneer Courthouse Square in 2013

Travel Portland operates the Portland Visitor Center in the West End of downtown Portland. It previously had a glass kiosk at Director Park. It also ran the Travel Portland Visitor Information Center (previously called Portland Oregon Visitors Association Information Center) on the Southwest Broadway side of Pioneer Courthouse Square, where it shared space with TriMet.

Following a $2.7 million renovation, the lobby at Pioneer Courthouse Square became a full-service visitor center in June 2001. POVA's Ticket Central outlet began operating at the visitor center. Previously, POVA and Ticket Central operated at the World Trade Center on Front Avenue. The visitor center at Pioneer Courthouse Square saw 40,665 people in June 2001, a 198 percent increase from June 2000. The lobby saw 207,782 visitors during June–September 2001, a 157 percent increase from 80,890 visitors during the same months in 2000. The renovation also included a remodeled TriMet counter, a theater, and restroom improvements. In 2002, the visitor center was leaking and required extensive repairs. The Oregonian reported, "large plastic sheets are tacked to the ceiling below the skylights and covering tourist brochures in a display case at the [POVA] counter. Water is pooling in the ceiling sheets over employees' heads and computers. Big plastic buckets and tubs are placed on the floor in spots where water drips constantly."

Travel Portland's office is in the First & Main building. As of 2010, its offices were at 1000 Southwest Broadway.

== Campaigns and projects ==
In 1985, POVA collaborated with the Port of Portland and tourism officials in Oregon and Washington to bring Japanese tourists to the Pacific Northwest. The organization has also promoted Portland to industry travel planners in Europe and other parts of the U.S. In the 1990s, POVA was a major contributor to the Travel Industry Council of Oregon. POVA co-sponsored astronaut Richard O. Covey's publicity tour of Portland. POVA was among groups opposing 1994 Oregon Ballot Measure 13, which focused on restricting LGBTQ rights in public education.

In 1998, POVA installed a live camera at Pittock Mansion, offering views of downtown Portland and Mount Hood on clear days. POVA also produced an album called Sounds of Portland in collaboration with KXL-FM and other companies. The album featured fourteen local musicians and raised funds for the Oregon Museum of Science and Industry and music programs in local schools. Fareless Square was also expanded to cover the Lloyd District, Oregon Convention Center (OCC), and Rose Quarter as part of an agreement between the city, Multnomah County, Metro, the Tri-County Lodging Association, national rental car companies, and POVA. Additionally, the Oregon Legislative Assembly amended state law to exempt trade shows from a ban on vendors displaying slot machines and video lottery terminals outside Oregon Lottery and tribal casinos, based on a request from POVA and the Oregon Tourism Commission; the reversal allowed Portland to host an Indian Gaming Association convention at the OCC in 2000.

In 2000, POVA helped fund a task force to improve east Multnomah County tourism. Mayor Vera Katz announced the formation of the Pacific Gateway Alliance in 2001; the agreement between the cities and ports of Portland and Vancouver, Washington, as well as POVA and the Portland Development Commission, was created to "promote our companies to the world as never before, with the goal of creating new markets for exports, tourism and business investment". Katz said the alliance would "support local efforts such as deepening the Columbia River navigation channel while complementing our environmental clean-up in the Portland harbor".

In 2001, The Oregonian said POVA's annual "Big Deal" campaign historically promoted Portland tourism in California, Idaho, Oregon, and Washington from October through May. POVA spent $120,000 on the campaign starting in October 2001, which was more focused on Oregon and Washington than in past years.

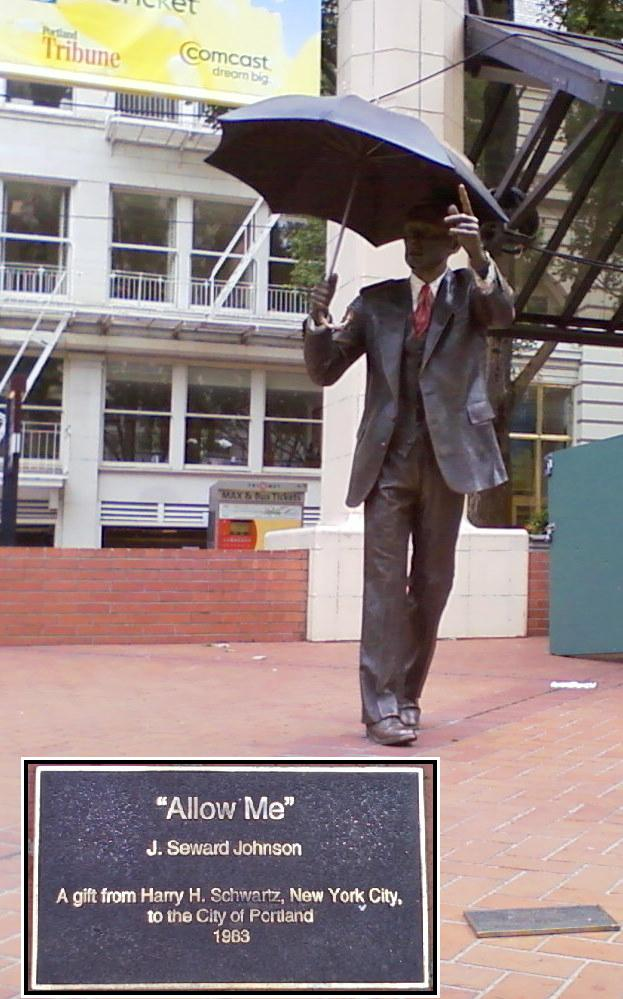
The organization has used a promotional video featuring Allow Me, a bronze sculpture in Pioneer Courthouse Square of a man holding an umbrella, in acknowledgment of the city's rainy weather.

In the early 2000s, POVA used the slogan "It's not easy being green" to acknowledge the Portland area's forests and rain. POVA had previously tried to avoid acknowledgment of rainy weather, but by 2004, the organization was using imagery to appreciate rain. POVA's promotional video featured Allow Me, John Seward Johnson II's 1983 bronze sculpture at Pioneer Courthouse Square of a man holding an umbrella, and the organization used business cards depicting raindrops. After the Mt. Hood Jazz Festival's relaunch and second festival by new leadership in 2003, POVA helped organizers acquire a $25,000 contribution from Multnomah County's hotel and motel tax. The organization also offered 25 percent discounts on Amtrak service between Eugene and Vancouver.

In 2005, POVA was among the sponsors of a fundraiser organized by the Portland Business Alliance to help mayor Tom Potter and commissioner Sam Adams pay off political campaign debts. In mid-2005, POVA supported the potential use of the aircraft carrier USS Ranger to become a local memorial and museum. POVA, Mercy Corps, Qwest, and VH1 collaborated with the Portland Jazz Festival to secure temporary housing for New Orleans-based jazz musicians, agents, and promoters following Hurricane Katrina (2005).

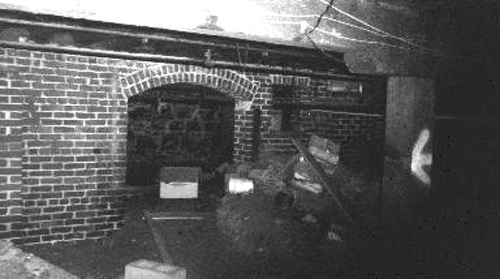
The Shanghai tunnels (pictured) have been used by the organization to promote Portland.

POVA has advocated for the construction of a hotel large enough to host conventions. In 2006, The Oregonian said POVA and Gordon Sondland of Aspen Investments of Portland "pushed for a minimum of 400 rooms, which would require less public subsidy". POVA, U.S. Bank, and other organizations sponsored Portland: The View from Here, a pictorial biography by photographer Robert Reynolds, in 2006. Melissa Jones of The Oregonian said the project "[became] popular with businesses looking to impress prospective employees, clients and visitors". In 2007, the newspaper said POVA "dangles the story" of Portland's Shanghai tunnels "as a lure to out-of-towners" and "concentrates on selling not only the city, but also its proximity to adventure".

In 2014, Travel Portland launched a winter tourism campaign by installing a 7,000-pound, 24-foot (7.3 m) tall cuckoo clock carved from an Oregon maple tree at Portland International Airport after visits to Seattle and Vancouver. Dubbed the nation's tallest freestanding cuckoo clock, the clock was disassembled in late 2016. Travel Portland launched an animated advertising campaign in 2015 and a campaign featuring the Bondi Hipsters in 2017. It had a stop motion campaign during 2017–2018, in collaboration with the studio House Special and Wieden+Kennedy. In 2019, Travel Portland, the city, and the Portland Business Alliance offered deals and free parking to make up for revenue lost during protests. In 2021, Travel Portland placed an advertisement in The New York Times and other major newspapers. The "This Is Portland" campaign received a mixed reaction.

=== Delegations ===
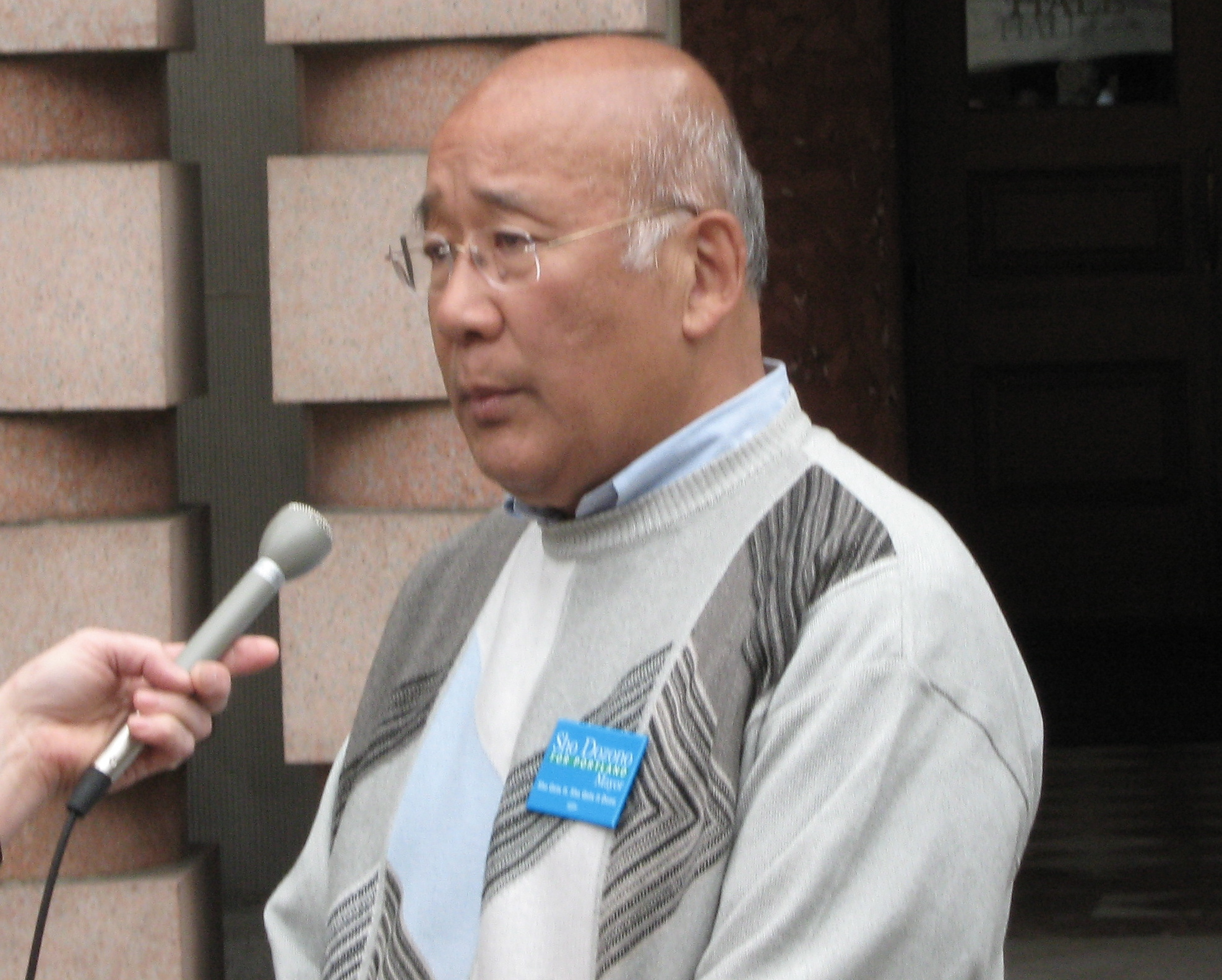
The organization's former president, Sho Dozono (pictured in 2008), led a delegation to New York City after the September 11 attacks.

In September 2001, following the September 11 attacks, POVA supported a delegation led by Dozono to visit New York City. Other supporters of the "Flight for Freedom" included the city of Eugene and the Bend Chamber of Commerce, as well as the Port of Portland, Portland State University, U.S. Bank, and Wells Fargo. More than 500 people signed up to join the delegation, including Katz, Eugene's mayor Jim Torrey, state senator Margaret Carter, Ron Saxton, representatives from Portland Public Schools and the Urban League of Portland, and other business and community leaders. According to The Oregonian, the delegation "captured the attention of New York media", and Katz and others were scheduled to appear on the television programs Today and NBC Nightly News.

POVA representatives were also part of a 50-member delegation to travel to Sapporo, one of Portland's sister cities, with Potter in early 2005.

=== Dining, hotel, and shopping campaigns ===
In late 2005, POVA, the city of Portland, and the Portland Business Alliance's Downtown Retail Council launched an advertising campaign for the holiday season to promote shopping in downtown Portland. The campaign included events, a website, and "green-clad sidewalk ambassadors with handheld computers to answer questions".

In 2022, POVA's "Cool Summer Deals" program offered discounts on attractions, restaurants, shopping, and transportation to visitors who made reservations at 28 participating hotels, and December's "Portland Big Deal" campaign saw approximately 30 local hotels offer special holiday packages, some of which included gift wrapping, tickets to the arts, wine tastings, and mistletoe left on pillows.

In 2023 and 2024, Travel Portland ran a campaign called "Ticket to Dine" to encourage dining in downtown Portland.

=== Events ===
In c. 1987, POVA began working with the United States Junior Chamber (USJC) to host the service organization's annual meeting in Portland. Following a commitment in 1988, USJC's meeting in 1992 was its first in Portland since 1971.

POVA was involved in the early development of the Portland Jazz Festival. Promoter Bill Royston approached POVA c. 1999 "about a downtown event that would be a cultural tourism event to provide support for hotels, restaurants and related businesses". POVA partnered with Royston Company to help bring the annual event to fruition in 2003.

POVA has also supported the Mt. Hood Jazz Festival. In 2000, The Oregonian said festival organizers "enlisted" POVA by including the organization's phone number on every advertisement "so travel groups could be funneled to hotels, restaurants and special package deals". POVA was a sponsor of the festival in 2001.

In 2000, POVA co-sponsored "Portlandances", described by The Oregonian as a new "celebration of dance". The Portland Center for the Performing Arts and the Regional Arts & Culture Council (RACC) also co-sponsored the event series. In 2022, POVA and Oregon's State Historic Preservation Office "lured" the National Trust for Historic Preservation to have a national conference in Portland in 2005. In 2003, POVA supported a local foundation's bid to host the U.S. Transplant Games, described by The Oregonian as an "Olympic-style festival for athletes who have received life-sustaining organ transplants", in 2004 or 2006. POVA was also among groups working to keep the G.I. Joe's 200 (now the Grand Prix of Portland) in the city. POVA was part of the business community supporting Harley-Davidson's 2003 event at the South Park Blocks. The Portland Institute for Contemporary Art partnered with POVA to market the Time-Based Art Festival to people outside the region in 2003. POVA supported and helped fund the bid to bring the U.S. Figure Skating Championships to the Rose Garden arena (now Moda Center) and Veterans Memorial Coliseum in 2005.

Travel Portland, the PDC, and mayor Adams were credited for recruiting the North American Handmade Bicycle Show, which was held at the OCC in February 2008. In March, Travel Portland launched a three-day "Green Familiarization Tour" to "persuade meeting planners from across the country that Portland is the place to convene", according to The Oregonian.

=== LGBTQ tourism ===
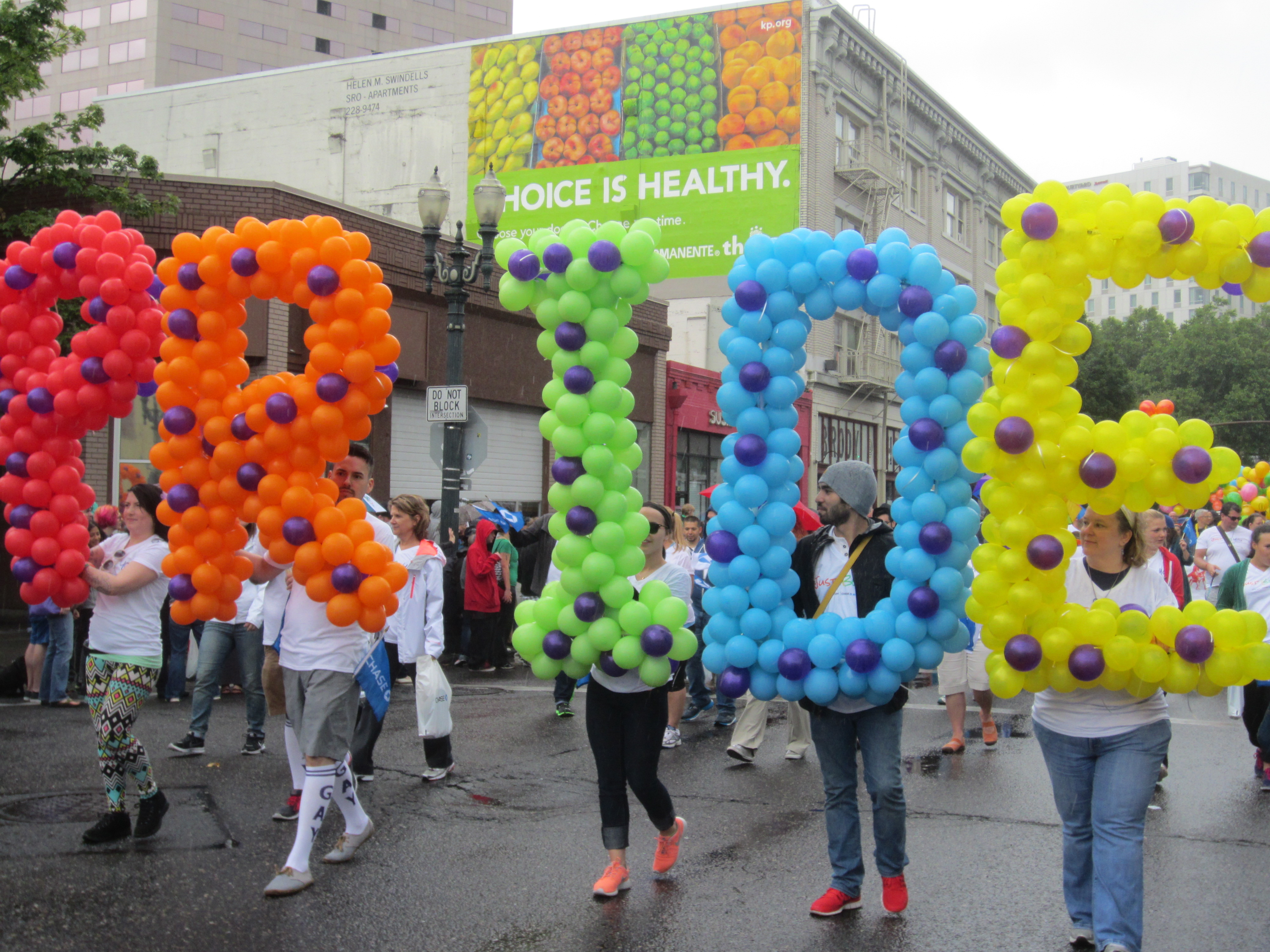
In 2004, the organization launched a campaign promoting Portland's Pride festival (pictured in 2014).

POVA has marketed Portland to the LGBTQ community. In 2003, the organization launched an LGBTQ-focused brochure, which was updated in 2005 to highlight "new gay friendly clubs and culture – along with the beautiful scenery, vibrant culinary scene and tax-free shopping". Between 2003 and 2005, POVA spent $24,000 on advertising and trade shows promoting LGBTQ tourism. POVA had a booth at the Gay and Lesbian World Travel Expo in Seattle in 2005.

In 2004, POVA launched an advertising campaign promoting Portland's Pride festival, among other events. POVA's "Gay Portland" brochure highlighted neighborhoods, bookstores, restaurants, and other cultural attractions "that might be of interest to gay tourists and other sexual minority groups". A new website geared towards the LGBTQ community attracted thousands of views and hotels like the Benson and the Paramount offered discounts to LGBTQ tourists.

=== Mr. Dude ===
Mr. Dude was Travel Portland's mascot to market the city to Japanese tourists. The "blue furry, Sasquatch-like creature" was created in 2016 as part of a campaign called the "World of Odnarotoop", a name derived from the Japanese pronunciation of Portland, spelled backwards. The bearded character was introduced in a video hosted on the website Odnarotoop.com. The video's theme music is performed by the Portland-based rock band Ages and Ages in Japanese, with some English words and phrases such as "breakfast", "crazy donuts", and "ice cream". Mr. Dude is featured on the website, saying, "Are you the one who want to go to Odnarotoop? I am your guide/camera man. Nice to meet you. Let's take a picture to start the trip." He also instructs users to upload their pictures, which are integrated into the music video. The mascot was inspired by "the joy and lightheartedness that the city embodies" and Sasquatch (or Bigfoot). Some Reddit users speculated that Mr. Dude was derived from a Portland man who is often seen wearing blue makeup, though a Travel Portland representative denied that the mascot was based on any particular individual.

A live version of Mr. Dude appeared before the Japanese Association of Travel Agents and at a tourism conference in Tokyo. Willamette Week described him as "huggable". In September 2016, Travel Portland credited Mr. Dude and the "World of Odnarotoop" campaign with helping to increase Japanese visitation to Portland by as much as 11 percent in the preceding 18 months. Mr. Dude ranked seventh in The Oregonian's 2017 list of Oregon's mascots and said, "Mr. Dude is a twee Travel Portland creation meant to represent Portland to the Japanese market. He's tall and hairy and blue and maybe into donuts? The best thing about him, probably, is his music video. The worst thing about him is that you can't see him unless you live in Japan." Animation Magazine called the campaign "bizarre" in 2018.

=== Oregon Convention Center ===
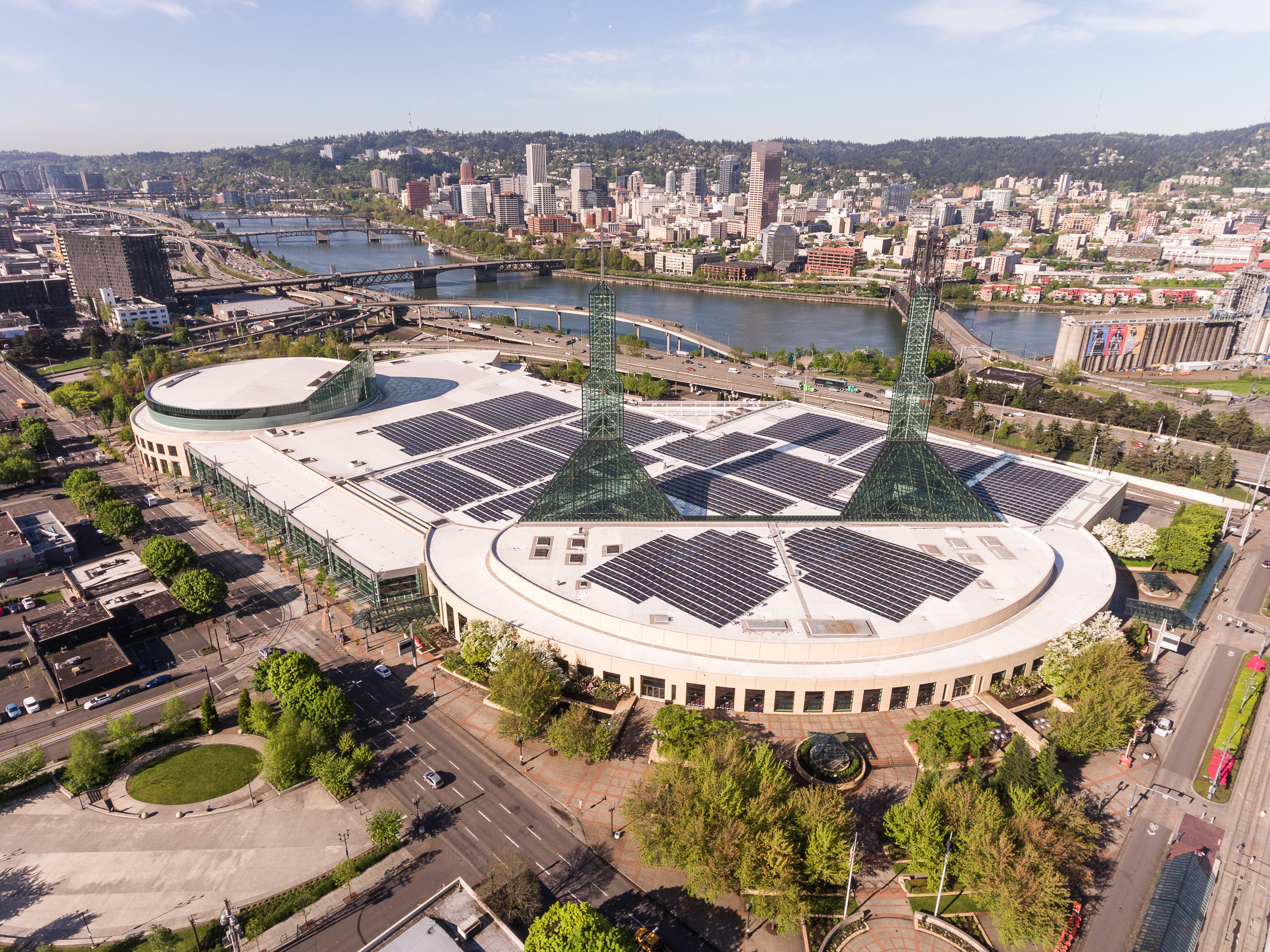
The organization has marketed the Oregon Convention Center (pictured in 2017) and supported the funding of its expansion.

The organization has marketed the OCC nationally. In 1998, The Oregonian said POVA had "a contract to find events to fill" the venue. As of 1999, POVA worked with the Oregon Convention and Visitor Services Network "to promote Portland as a convention destination", according to The Oregonian. The Metropolitan Exposition-Recreation Commission's marketing contract with POVA increased from $1.6 million in 1998 to $2.3 million in 2000.

In 2001, D'Alessandro and POVA helped to lead a public–private partnership to fund the convention center's expansion. Portland City Council approved $100 million in bonds funded by a 2.5 percent tax on hotel and car rentals. The Oregonian credited Katz for uniting Metro, Multnomah County, POVA, and TriMet to make the Visitor Development Initiative possible.

In 2003, a commission by the Metropolitan Exposition-Recreation Commission cut the budget for POVA's marketing of the OCC by $250,000. POVA also hosted a luncheon in 2003 to commemorate the opening of the convention center's expansion. POVA booked events at the OCC as of 2007.

=== Public art ===
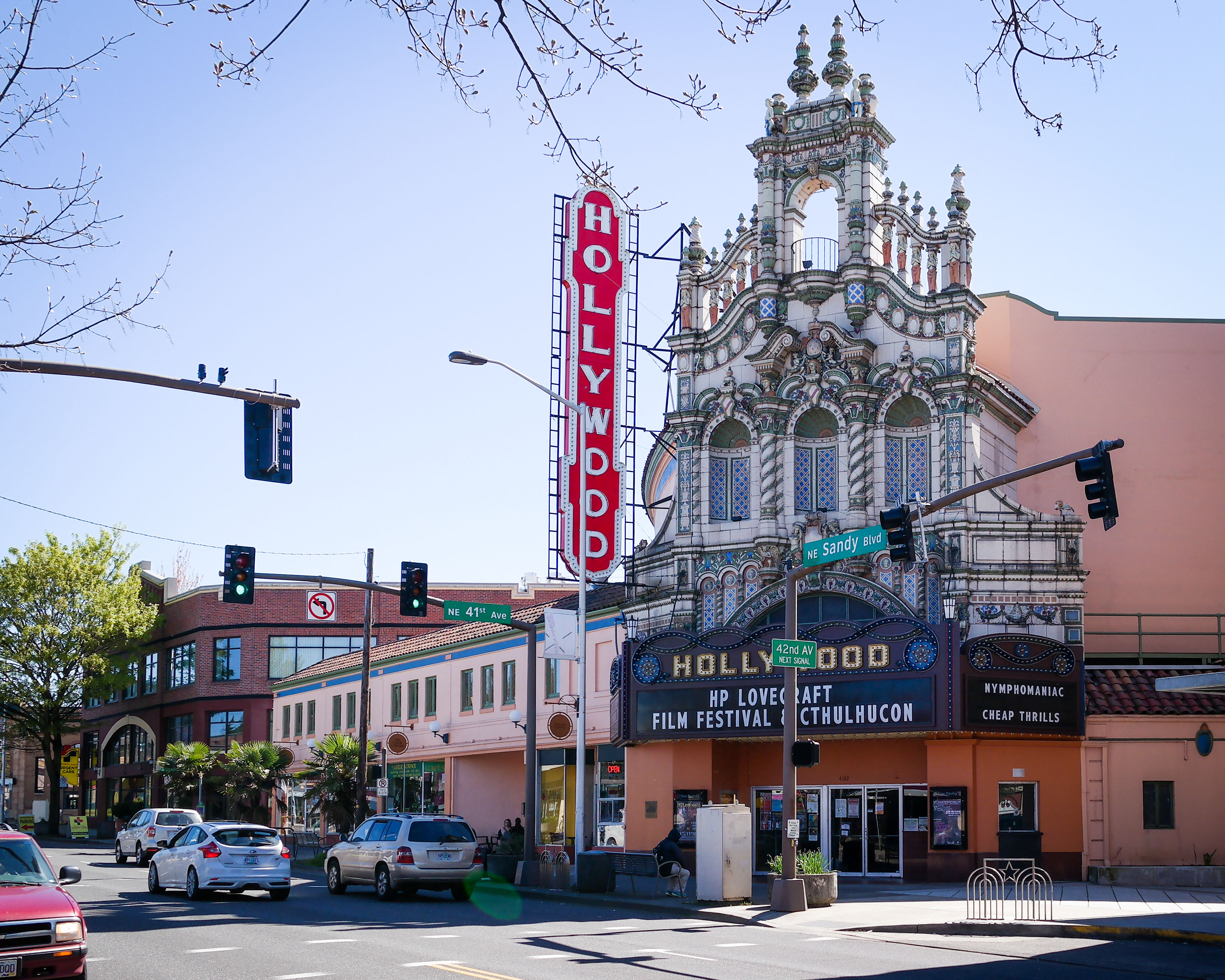
In 2018, Travel Portland and Travel Oregon collaborated with the Hollywood Theatre (pictured in 2014) on an art project at Portland International Airport.

In 2000, POVA co-sponsored an updated edition of Art in Unexpected Places, a map of public art in Clackamas County. Other sponsors included Barnes & Noble, the Clackamas Community College Foundation, the Clackamas County Tourism Development Council, and RACC. POVA and RACC published a new walking tour brochure and map featuring approximately 100 public artworks in the Portland metropolitan area in 2005. In 2018, Travel Portland, the Hollywood Theatre, Travel Oregon, and other companies collaborated on an art project at Portland International Airport's south pedestrian tunnel. The project displayed a series of posters for films and television shows shot in Oregon over a 160-foot (49 m) mural by Darren Cools. The work was slated to remain until 2020.

Travel Portland has funded beautification projects via the Visitor Experience Enhancement Grant program. The organization funded a mural visible from Martin Luther King Jr. Boulevard in southeast Portland with the text "support working artists" in 2023. Travel Portland funded the Viaduct Arts Column Mural Initiative in 2024. The project by the Portland Street Art Alliance and artist Hayden Senter included four bridge column murals in the Central Eastside. Two of the columns commemorate the Pearl District's Lovejoy Columns, one honors the Portland Rose Festival's dragon boat races, and another is about the Ground Score Association, which the Portland Tribune described as the city's "democratic worker association of dumpster divers, canners and waste pickers".

=== Sneakers and sportswear ===
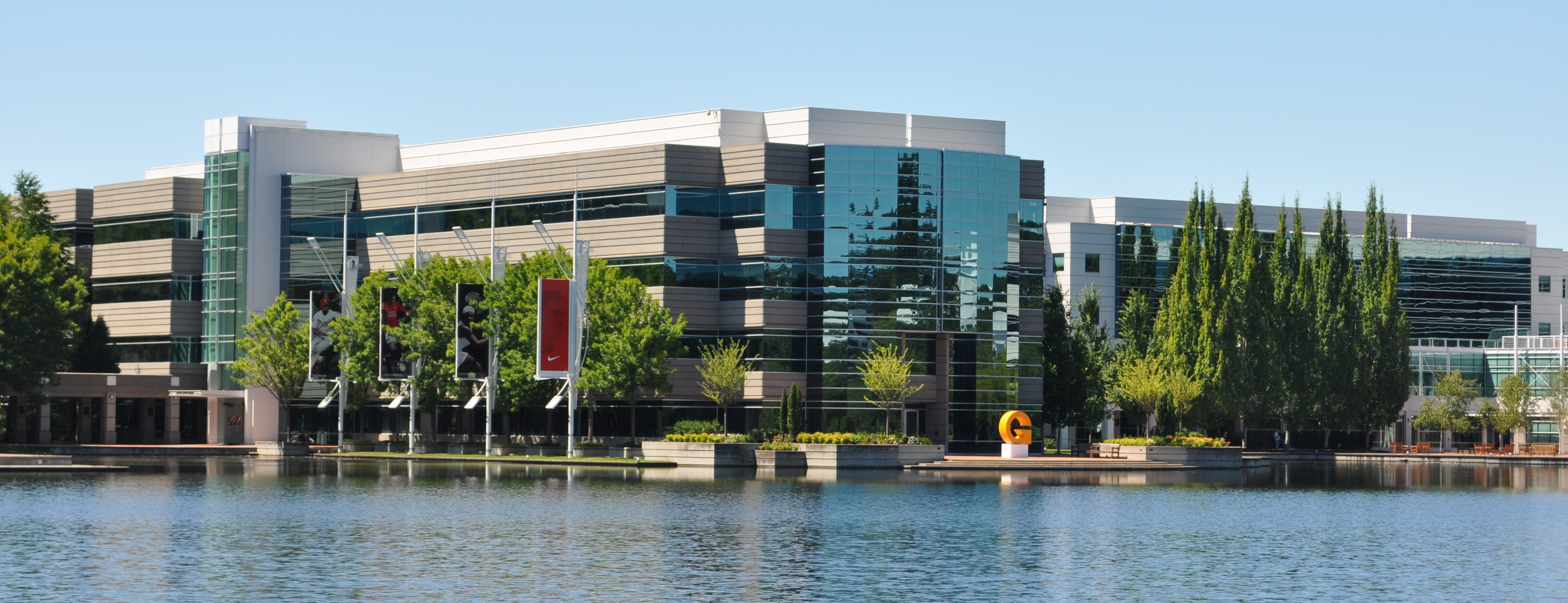
The organization has helped organize tours of the Nike World Headquarters (pictured in 2010).

POVA has also marketed Portland's association with sneakers and sportswear. In 2003, The Oregonian said POVA had an advertisement a few years prior that "obliquely mentioned that despite Portland's relative small size, one of its many attributes included access to 'the world's biggest shoe company'." POVA asked Adidas and Nike to sponsor fun runs during annual trade shows for national engineering and science associations. POVA handed out fliers promoting Columbia Sportswear and Nike stores at the conventions. POVA has also helped organize tours of the Nike World Headquarters "for out-of-town VIPs", including officials from Bologna (one of Portland's sister cities) in June 2003.

=== Transportation ===
In 1992, The Oregonian said that the Port of Portland, "at the urging" of POVA, the Oregon Economic Development Department, and the PDC, had been working "for a long time" to get nonstop Portland – New York flight service.

POVA has influenced Portland's taxi industry. In 1999, the organization proposed an analysis of ground transportation services to reduce conflict during a time of "brutal competition among cabs, town cars, shuttles and limos for fares at the airport", according to The Oregonian. In 2001, POVA was among ten members of the city's Taxicab Board of Review, which advises City Council on the taxi industry.

== See also ==
- Culture of Portland, Oregon
- Tourism in Portland, Oregon
