= One Main Place =

One Main Place is the name of several buildings in the United States:

- One Main Place (Dallas) in Dallas, Texas
- One Main Place (Portland, Oregon) in Portland, Oregon
