= Peter Zuckerman =

American journalist and author (born 1979)

- Born: Peter Edward Zuckerman; December 27, 1979 (age 46)
- Education: Reed College (BS)
- Occupations: Journalist, author, activist
- Employer: The Oregonian
- Partner: Sam Adams

Peter Zuckerman (born December 27, 1979) is an American journalist and author who has focused his career in court reporting, investigative journalism, and adventure stories. He is also a leader of several prominent progressive political campaigns.

== Early life and education ==
Zuckerman attended the Chadwick School in Los Angeles County, California, and graduated from Reed College with a degree in biology in 2003. As a student at Reed, Zuckerman served on the editorial board of the Reed College Quest, a student-run newspaper. In March 2002 he wrote an opinion piece in The Oregonian ("The drug Olympics") condemning competitive use of drugs like gamma-hydroxybutyric acid, or GHB, at the school. He was the target of numerous threats within the Reed College community, and he was both criticized and praised in letters to the Oregonian.

Zuckerman interned for the LGBTQ-focused Portland weekly Just Out while at Reed, delivering the paper and fact-checking telephone numbers. He also interned for the Portland bureau of the Associated Press and The Springfield News. He went on to work as a journalist in Eastern Idaho.

== Career ==
=== Journalism ===
In 2006, Zuckerman was the lead writer of a multi-part story, Scouts' Honor, in the Idaho Falls Post Register about the coverup of a multi-state child molestation case involving at least two dozen minors and the Boy Scouts of America in Idaho.

After the story was published, Zuckerman was accused of having a bias against the Boy Scouts of America and the Church of Jesus Christ of Latter-day Saints (LDS Church) because of his sexual orientation. and he became the target of personal attacks on the basis of his sexual orientation.

For work on the series, Zuckerman received the 2006 Livingston Award and the 2007 C.B. Blethen Award, and the Post-Register won the Scripps Foundation's 2005 National Journalism Awards for distinguished service to the First Amendment.

Zuckerman was profiled in a September 25, 2007, documentary, "In A Small Town," broadcast in the PBS series, Exposé: America's Investigative Reports. The documentary was a nominated for an Emmy Award. A profile about Zuckerman in Harvard University's Nieman Foundation for Journalism report about courage in journalism won the 2007 Mirror Award for best coverage of breaking news, and he appeared on The Rachel Maddow Show.

After moving back to Oregon, Zuckerman continued to investigate the Boy Scouts of America and the LDS church while working for The Oregonian. In this article, Men Sue Scouts, Mormon Church, six men allege a former troop leader and church teacher abused them and seek $25 million in compensation as the LDS church failed to thoroughly investigate, report the abuse to law enforcement, provide mental health services to victims or remove the abuser from contact with children once it learned about the abuse.

Zuckerman later changed his reporting to focus on stories that had more of an environmental bent. For example, he wrote about the Forest Service loosening its environmental standards so a gas corporation can clear cut through old growth in the Mount Hood National Forest to make way for an LNG pipeline.

In 2020, Zuckerman and his journalism were the subject of a documentary, "Church and the Fourth Estate," a retrospective about his reporting in Idaho, attempts to stop that reporting, and what happened to the people involved. The documentary premiered at the Sundance Film Festival.

=== Non-fiction author ===
In January 2009, Zuckerman took a leave from The Oregonian to work on a "dream book project" after his partner, Sam Adams, was elected mayor of Portland. While researching the book, Zuckerman nearly died while traveling through remote regions of Nepal and ingesting a "half plant, half animal" caterpillar fungus.

The book, Buried in the Sky, co-written with Amanda Padoan, tells the true adventure story of the 2008 K2 disaster from the perspective of Sherpas and Pakistani high-altitude porters. The book was published on June 11, 2012, in the United States and Canada by W.W. Norton & Company. Reviews are positive. Outside magazine described it as "easily the most riveting and important mountaineering book of the past decade." The Wall Street Journal described it as "enthralling." Men's Journal called it "an indispensable addition to the genre," and many publications, such as The Boston Globe, favorably compared it to Into Thin Air.

The book was awarded the 2012 NCTE George Orwell Award, the Banff Mountain Book Festival Award for mountain history, the National Outdoor Book Award for History., the Independent Publishers Association award for general non-fiction, and the American Society of Journalists and Author's Outstanding Book Award for general non-fiction.

In 2019, Outside Magazine chose "Buried in the Sky" as part of a "Contemporary Adventure Canon" made up of the best contemporary adventure books of all time.

=== Teaching ===
Zuckerman has received numerous journalism awards, including the Livingston Award, the National Journalism Award and the C.B. Blethen Award

Zuckerman has visited and taught at Poynter Institute, University of Georgia and the University of Southern California. He is currently an adjunct fellow at the Attic Institute writing workshop and a resident at the Falcon Art Community.

=== Political campaigns ===
In 2013, Zuckerman became the press secretary for Oregon United for Marriage, the campaign to legalize same-sex marriage in Oregon, and for Oregon United Against Discrimination, a related campaign organized to defeat an anti-gay ballot measure. The anti-gay measure would have created an exception to Oregon's anti-discrimination law, allowing businesses deny service because of their sexual orientation or gender identity.

During the marriage campaign, support for gay marriage increased by 14 points, volunteers collected 160,000 signatures to put gay marriage on the ballot, and the marriage campaign raised $3 million.

Later that year, Zuckerman went on to become the communications director for New Approach Oregon / Yes on 91, the campaign to legalize recreational use of marijuana in Oregon (Measure 91). The campaign followed perennial, unsuccessful efforts to legalize marijuana by ballot initiative, including in 1986 and in 2012, which made it to the ballot, but voters had rejected. Marijuana legalization in Oregon passed with 56 percent of the vote, making Oregon the third state to legalize marijuana. Drug policy advocates described the victory as a major turning point in the drug reform movement.

In 2016, Zuckerman directed communications for 2016 Oregon Ballot Measure 98, to provide more funding for education. The initiative, allocated $150 million a year into the schools to improve Oregon's graduation rate, won with 65% of the vote.

In 2018, Zuckerman directed communications for the No on 105 campaign to protect Oregon's anti-discrimination law (No on 105). The No on 105 campaign was victorious, receiving 63% of the vote.

In 2019 and 2020, Zuckerman was the campaign manager for the Drug Addiction Treatment and Recovery Act to decriminalize drug possession and expand drug treatment, paying for it with existing taxes on legal marijuana sales. In 2020 during the pandemic, the campaign gathered 143,000 signatures, enough to qualify the initiative for the ballot and become Measure 110. The campaign raised $5.4 million and won endorsements from more than 140 organizations.

Measure 110 passed with 59% of the vote, making Oregon the first state in the U.S. to decriminalize all drugs, including hard drugs. A similar effort to decriminalize drugs in Ohio had failed. The New York Times described the victory in Oregon as "one of the most radical drug-law overhauls in the nation's history," and The Intercept called it the "biggest step yet to ending the war on drugs." Measure 110 is expected to generate $100 million in additional money for drug treatment in Oregon, which is four times more than the state currently spends outside of Medicaid and the criminal justice system.

== Personal life ==
Zuckerman's partner is Sam Adams, the former mayor of Portland, Oregon.

== See also ==
- List of LGBT people from Portland, Oregon
