= Oregon Tourism Commission =

Semi-independent government agency

- Travel Oregon

Agency overview
- Formed: 1995
- Type: Semi-independent state agency
- Jurisdiction: Oregon
- Status: Active (Semi-independent since 2003)
- Headquarters: Salem, Oregon
- Parent agency: Government of Oregon
- Website: traveloregon.com

The Oregon Tourism Commission, which does business as Travel Oregon, is a semi-independent agency of the government of Oregon based in the state capital of Salem. The agency is run by a nine-member board appointed by the state's governor, and governs several programs that work to grow the state economy by promoting tourism.

The agency was established in 1995 and became a semi-independent agency in 2003. It is funded by a 1.5% statewide transient lodging tax. Travel Oregon's former executive director's base salary of $365,000 faced scrutiny.

== History ==
The Oregon Tourism Commission was established in 1995. It was granted semi-independent status by the Oregon Legislature in 2003.

A February 2020 audit of Travel Oregon by Oregon Secretary of State (Bev Clarno) "found that Travel Oregon’s managers are some of the highest compensated managers compared to state agency managers", stating that their salaries had "increased by 76% since 2012" and that although "they hired a consultant in 2016 to conduct a comparative salary analysis that the agency used as a basis for determining salary ranges for Travel Oregon personnel, (...) the agency was not able to provide detailed documentation from 2016 that was used to set staff compensation." (Note: Clarno and Memmott, 2020. At "Executive Summary".) The audit also said that Travel Oregon's contracting process was not being done competitively, highlighting that its largest advertising contract, which was with Portland-based company Wieden+Kennedy, "[had] not been competitively bid since 2010," despite having contracted with Travel Oregon every year since then. (Note: Bevno and Memmott, 2020. Pp. 9–10.) Travel Oregon CEO Todd Davidson agreed with the recommendations, while also defending Travel Oregon's use of funds for advertising, saying that "[every] dollar spent in advertising and strategic marketing results in $157 dollars in direct tourism spending in communities throughout Oregon."

Travel Oregon came under further scrutiny in 2025. On May 22, 2025, Travel Oregon CEO Todd Davidson announced he was retiring immediately, but would stay with the organization for up to a year to help search for a new CEO. That same day, James Neff of OJP released an article saying that Davidson's retirement announcement "came five weeks after the Oregon Journalism Project first contacted Travel Oregon about an investigation into complaints regarding Davidson’s outsized compensation and allegations of a toxic workplace" and "one day before the CEO was scheduled to sit down for a long-delayed interview with OJP." On May 24, OJP published the results of their investigation, saying that "for years Travel Oregon has operated with little oversight from lawmakers or the governors who appoint its board, even as its budget has ballooned from nothing to more than $45 million a year." OJP also reported that Travel Oregon "maintains a workplace that some accuse of management by intimidation", that it "failed to allocate $9 million in small grants" for "travel organizations across the state trying to recover after the pandemic", and that "Davidson and his agency benefit from loose oversight by its board of commissioners and the Legislature, which sets taxes and scrutinizes other state agencies that rely on nongeneral fund dollars, like ODOT and the Oregon Lottery, while leaving Travel Oregon essentially unmonitored." OJP also said that they had interviewed Davidson on May 23, and said that "Davidson denied Travel Oregon was a fearful workplace", and that he defended the holdover of the grant money as being "caused by a staffing crunch" and "half of that rollover money is going out right now." On June 16, OJP published another piece saying that Travel Oregon had just decided on Davidson's compensation for the following year, but would not share it with the public, prompting concern and criticism from various Oregon representatives and First Amendment lawyers. Later that day, Travel Oregon disclosed Davidson's base salary for the following year would be $342,000 ($23,000 less than his 2024 base salary).

== See also ==
- Cannabis tourism in Portland, Oregon
- Oregon Wine Board
- Tourism in Portland, Oregon
- Travel Portland
- United States Travel and Tourism Administration
- Visit California

== Sources ==
- Clarno, Bev; Memmott, Kip (February 2020). Travel Oregon Should Strengthen Controls over Contracting and Improve Accountability of Compensation to Inform Decision Makers (Report). Archived from the original on July 16, 2025.
