= 2008 Portland, Oregon, mayoral election =

- May 20, 2008
- Turnout: 62.34%
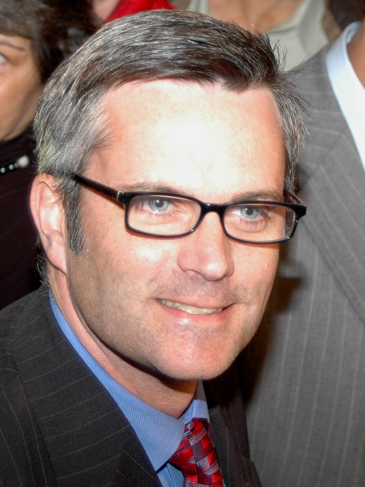

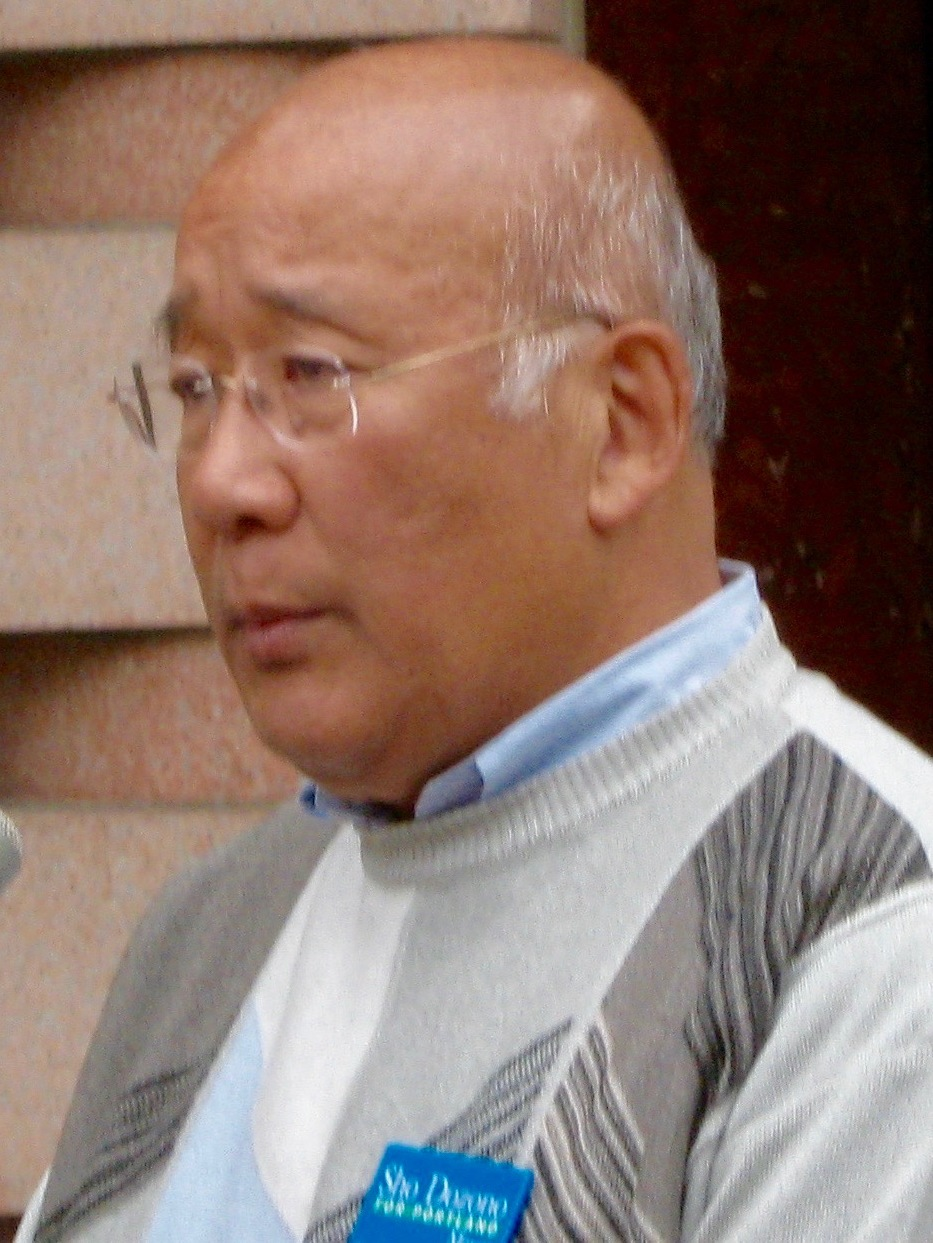
Nominee	Sam Adams	Sho Dozono
Popular vote	108,323	61,540
Percentage	58.6%	33.3%
Mayor before election
Tom Potter
Elected mayor
Sam Adams

On May 20, 2008, an election was held in Portland, Oregon, to elect the mayor. Sam Adams was elected, defeating challenger Sho Dozono. Incumbent mayor Tom Potter did not seek a second term.

Portland uses a nonpartisan system for local elections, in which all voters are eligible to participate. All candidates are listed on the ballot without any political party affiliation.

Candidates competed in a blanket primary election on May 20, 2008. Because Sam Adams received an absolute majority of the vote in the primary election, no run-off election was held.

== Candidates ==
- David "The Ack" Ackerman, dishwasher and photographer
- Sam Adams, City Commissioner
- Bruce Broussard, business owner
- Kyle Burris
- Vladislav S. "Slav" Davidzon, entrepreneur (withdrawn)
- Sho Dozono, businessman
- Steven Entwisle, activist
- Bob Leonard Forthan
- Craig Gier, engineer
- Lew Humble, retired mechanic
- James Bernard Lee, retired researcher
- Beryl Sylvia McNair
- Nick Popenuk (withdrew)
- Christopher Rich
- Patricia Stuart
- Jeff Taylor, former West Linn Budget Committee member
- Gerhard Watzig, program manager (withdrew)

== Polling ==
Poll source	Date(s) administered	Sample size	Margin of error	Sam Adams	Sho Dozono	Other	Undecided
KATU News	April 2008	599	±4.1%	39%	38%	14%	10%
FOX News/Portland Tribune	February 2008			41%	20%	2%	36%

== Results ==
Portland mayoral primary election, 2008
Party	Candidate	Votes	%
Nonpartisan	Sam Adams	108,323	58.64
Nonpartisan	Sho Dozono	61,540	33.31
Nonpartisan	Patricia Stuart	4,821	2.61
Nonpartisan	Jeff Taylor	3,014	1.63
Nonpartisan	David Ackerman	1,572	0.85
Nonpartisan	James Bernard Lee	1,546	0.84
Nonpartisan	Christopher Rich	941	0.51
Nonpartisan	Beryl Sylvia McNair	569	0.31
Nonpartisan	Lew Humble	548	0.30
Nonpartisan	Kyle Burris	424	0.23
Nonpartisan	Steven Entwisle	308	0.17
Nonpartisan	Craig Gier	307	0.17
Nonpartisan	Bob Leonard Forthan	185	0.10
Write-in		626	0.34
Total votes		184,279	100
