= Oregon Sustainability Center =

Proposed office building in Portland, Oregon, U.S.

Coordinates: 45.5112°N 122.6813°W

The Oregon Sustainability Center was a proposed high-rise office building that would have been located near Portland State University in Downtown Portland, Oregon. The building was meant to be a "living building" that showcased green building designs and sustainability. The entire project was expected to cost $120 million. Portland mayor Sam Adams decided to end the planning on the project in October 2012.

== See also ==
- Architecture of Portland, Oregon
- Edith Green – Wendell Wyatt Federal Building
- List of tallest buildings in Portland, Oregon
