= Cannabis tourism in Portland, Oregon =

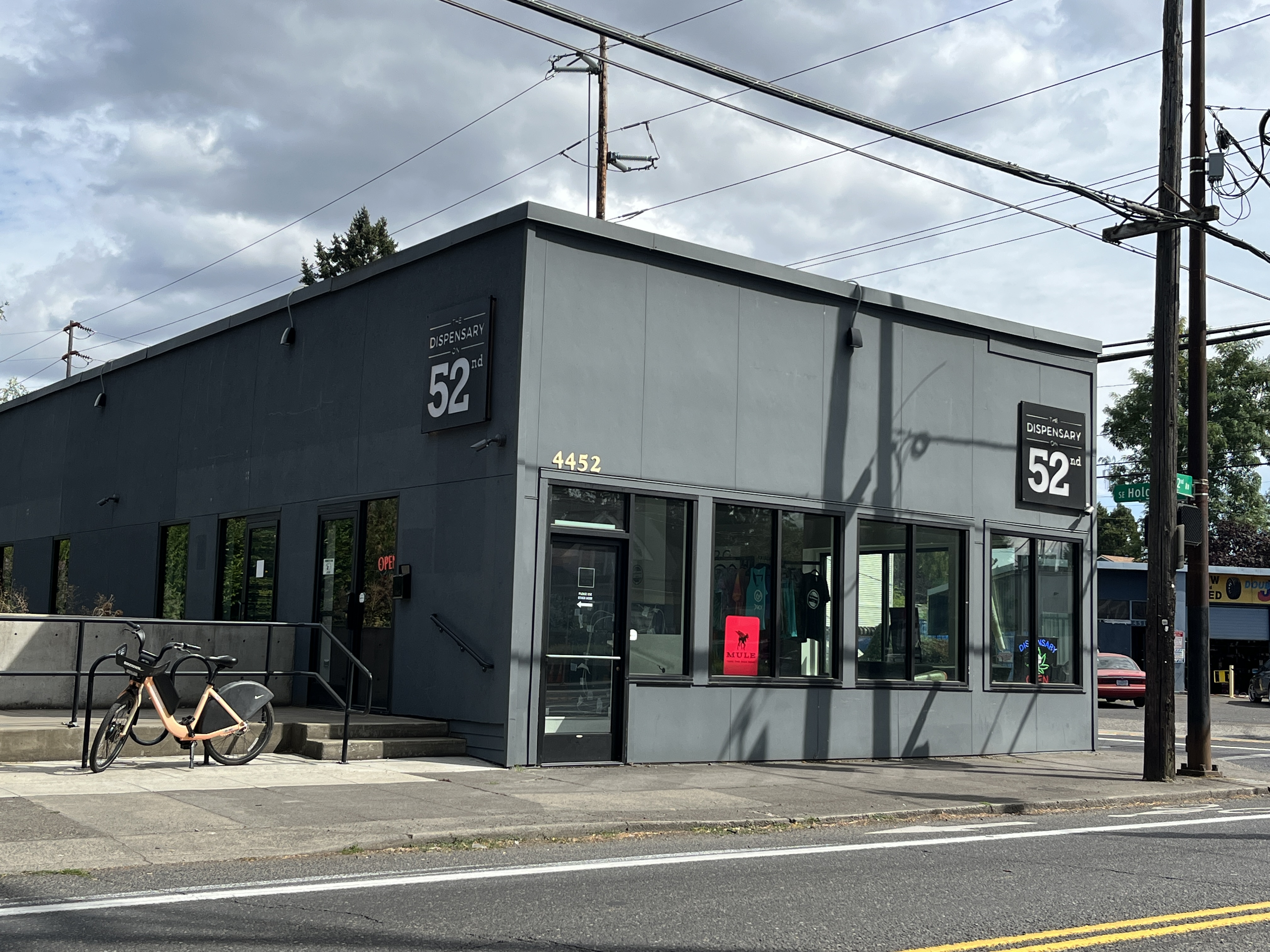
Cannabis dispensary in Portland, Oregon, in 2022

Cannabis tourism is a section of the tourism industry and cannabis industry in Portland, Oregon, one of the first U.S. cities to legalize adult consumption under Ballot Measure 91 in 2014.

Northwest Cannabis Club (also called NW Cannabis Club or NWCC) was a members-only cannabis consumption lounge in Portland, Oregon. Members-only clubs opened after the Oregon Indoor Clean Air Act was amended in 2015 to outlaw cannabis smoke in public locations. Many clubs closed during the COVID pandemic. Flight Lounge opened after the pandemic, in 2023, "Portland's answer to an Amsterdam coffee house". One company incorporates bicycle culture in a "bicycle tour of legal weed" in the city.

The official tax-funded tourism agency Travel Portland includes a section on "safe spaces for cannabis tourism" on its website. The agency has acknowledged cannabis tourism since at least 2017 in its promotion of tourism in Portland.

A 2024 analysis of "weed friendly" lodging rentals for vacationers (including data from Airbnb and others) showed that Portland was third least expensive cannabis tourism destination in the country, behind Spokane and Columbus.

== See also ==
- Cannabis in Oregon
- Tourism in Portland, Oregon
