= World Trade Center (Portland, Oregon) =

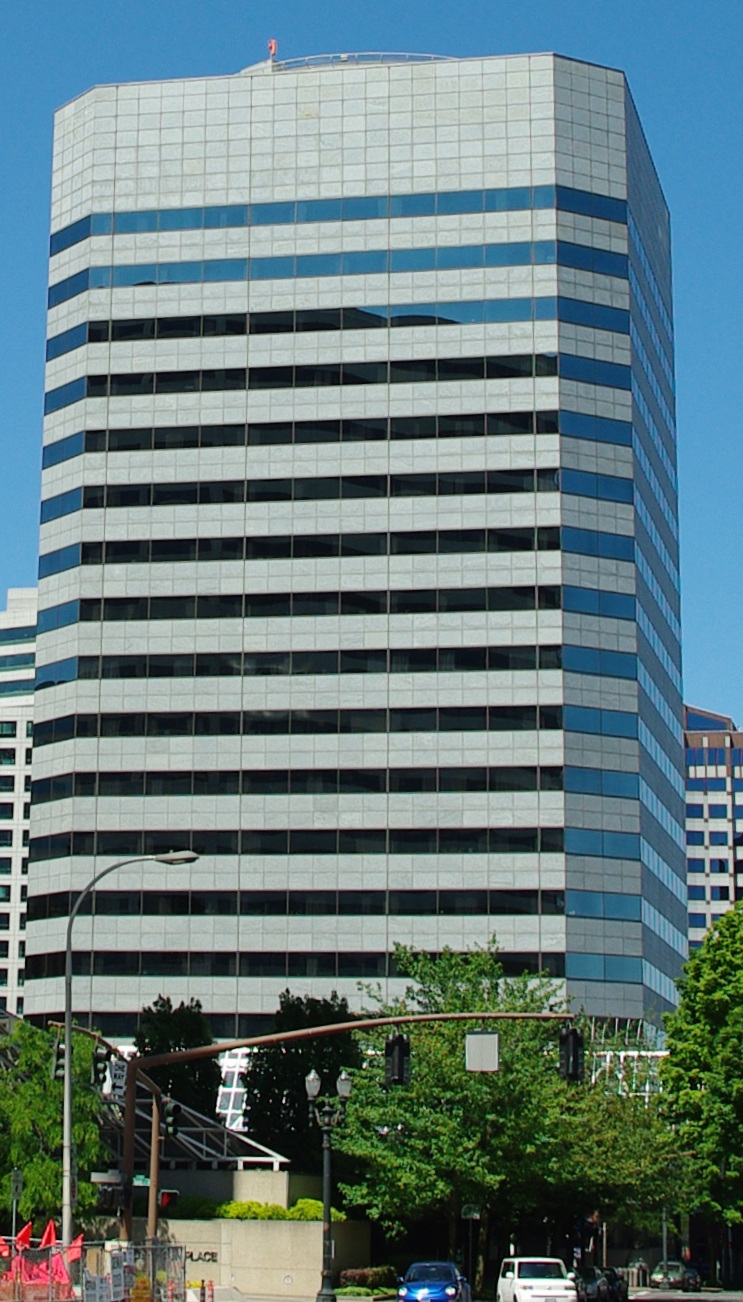
- One World Trade Center

- Location within Portland, Oregon
- Alternative names: Willamette Center; One WTC; 1 WTC

General information
- Status: Completed
- Type: High-rise building
- Location: 121 SW Salmon Street, Portland, Oregon, U.S
- Coordinates: 45.51627°N 122.67484°W
- Current tenants: Commercial offices
- Completed: 1977

Height
- Roof: 230 feet (70 m)

Technical details
- Floor count: 17
- Floor area: 474,867 sq ft (44,116.6 m^{2})

Design and construction
- Architect: Zimmer Gunsul Frasca Partnership

The World Trade Center is a three-building office complex in Portland in the U.S. state of Oregon. The main building, One World Trade Center, is a 17-story office tower that is the fifth-largest office tower in Portland with 474,867 sq ft (44,116.6 m^{2}). Completed in 1977, One World Trade Center is 230 feet (70 m) tall and is topped by a helipad. The complex is operated by the World Trade Center Properties and is the headquarters for Portland General Electric. There is also a 220-seat theater, known as the World Trade Center Auditorium.

== History ==
Portland General Electric (PGE) began construction in 1975 on a three-building, $32 million complex to be known as the Willamette Center. Located between Front (now Naito Parkway) and Second avenues, and Taylor and Yamhill streets in Downtown Portland, the 873,000-square-foot (81,100 m^{2}) complex was scheduled to open in January 1977. Plans originally called for construction of an outdoor ice skating rink at the complex. The five-story building in the complex was completed in 1976. More of the $54 million complex was opened by March 1977. In addition to being the headquarters of PGE, other initial tenants included the local offices of International Paper and Fireman's Fund Insurance Company.

PGE was forced to sell the building in 1978 to American Property Investors and then lease back the space. The Oregon Public Utility Commission determined PGE could not bill customers for the expense of building the complex. In 1985, PGE launched a study to determine if a World Trade Center should be established in Portland, but a location had not been determined. The Oregon Legislature passed a bill in 1987 to establish the Oregon Trade and Marketing Center, which was to be housed in the Willamette Center. The Willamette Center was renamed as the World Trade Center in 1988 when the Oregon Trade and Marketing Center moved into the building, and was also renovated.

Following the attacks on New York's World Trade Center on September 11, 2001, Portland's World Trade Center was evacuated. A new roof was installed on the building in 2008, and the next year sustainable landscaping was installed around the complex. In June 2010, a fire in the basement caused the building to be evacuated. Another fire damaged a stairwell in November 2011 when someone used a Molotov cocktail.

== Details ==
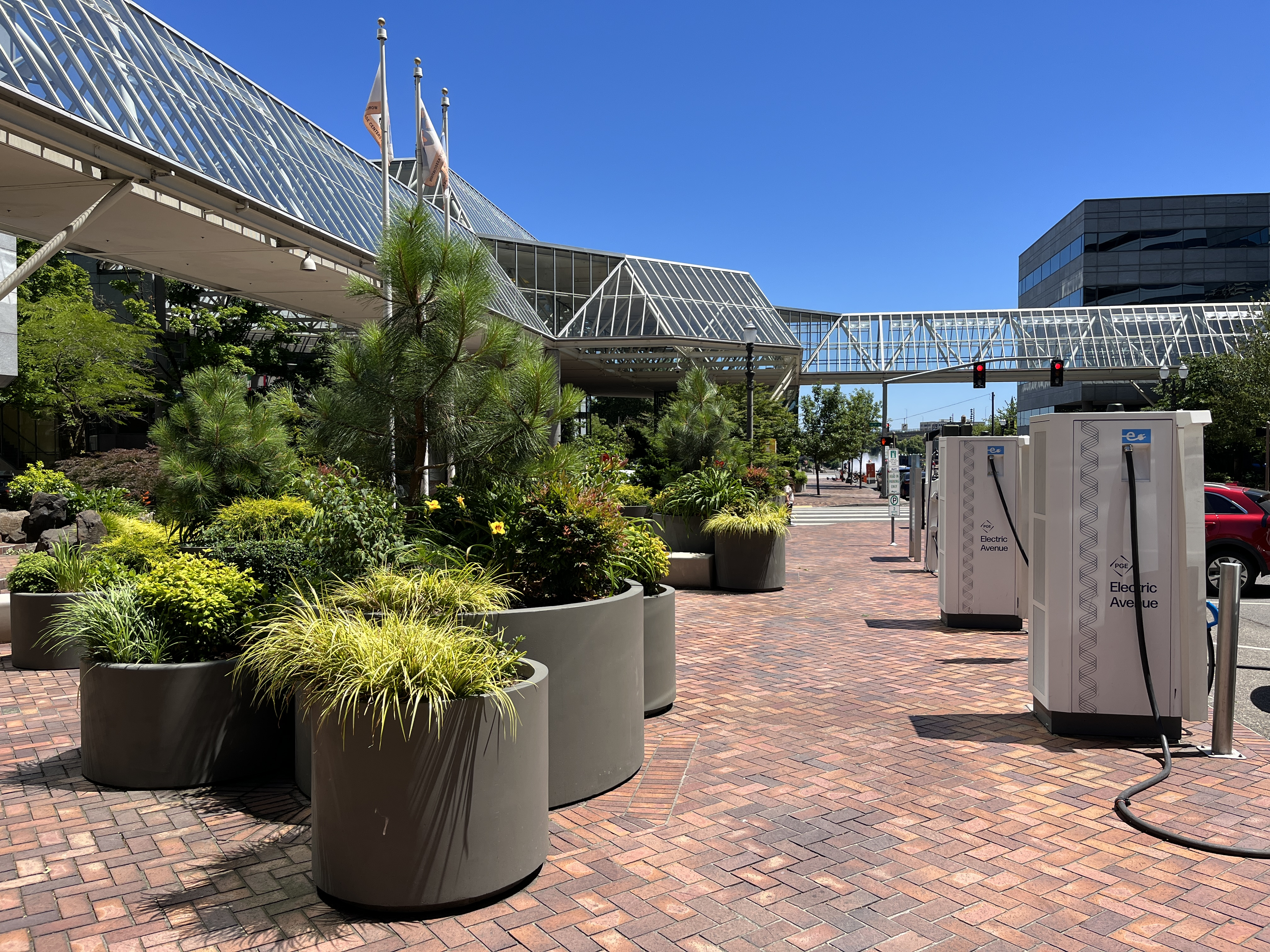
The street level plaza

The three-building complex was designed by Zimmer Gunsul Frasca Partnership (now ZGF Architects LLP), with the buildings connected by a glass-enclosed, elevated walkway. The facade of the modernist-style buildings consists of gray-colored granite. Primarily office space, the 798,000-square-foot (74,100 m^{2}) complex also houses restaurants and retail space on the ground floor, and also includes a theater. There are also 400 underground parking spaces and 13 charging stations for electric vehicle.

One World Trade Center is a 17-story, 230-foot (70 m) tower of a curtain wall design for the facade. The roof of One World Trade Center houses the World Trade Center Heliport. One Main Place is south of One World Trade Center, while the Mark O. Hatfield United States Courthouse is southwest of One World Trade Center.

The shortest of the buildings in the complex is Two World Trade Center (or World Trade Center 2), which is 55.9 feet (17.0 m) tall and has four stories. The World Trade Center is located inside Two World Trade Center, along with meeting space and an 11,041-square-foot (1,025.7 m^{2}) outdoor plaza. Tom McCall Waterfront Park is adjacent to Two and Three World Trade Center on the east, across from Salmon Street Springs. Three World Trade Center (or World Trade Center 3) is a five-story low-rise topping out at 69.9 feet (21.3 m).

== See also ==
- Seaport Village Carousel, a carousel formerly located at the WTC
