= One Main Place (Portland, Oregon) =

Skyscraper in Portland Oregon

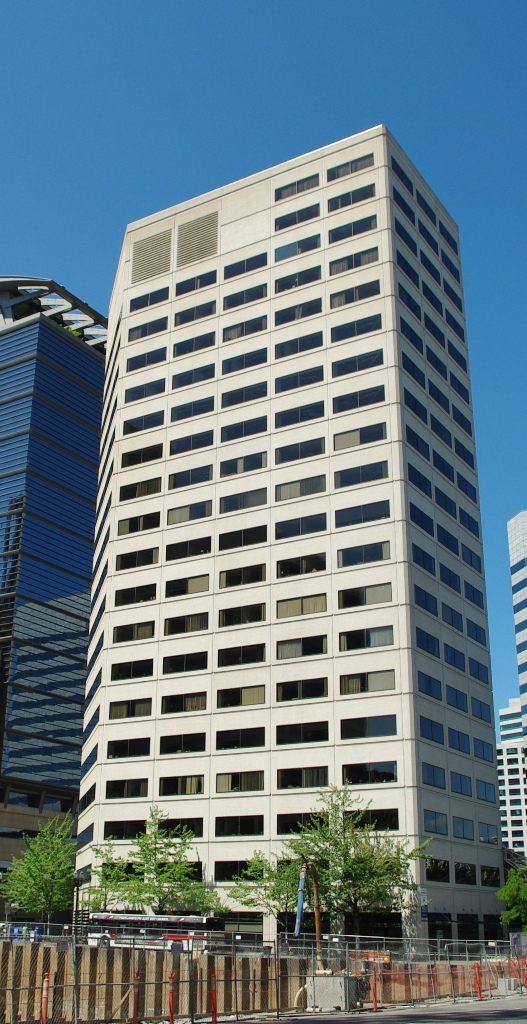
- One Main Place from the south

- Location within Portland, Oregon

General information
- Type: Office
- Location: 101 SW Main Street; Portland, Oregon, United States
- Coordinates: 45°30′56″N 122°40′31″W
- Completed: 1982

Height
- Roof: 270 feet (82 m)

Technical details
- Floor count: 20
- Floor area: 353,000 square feet (32,800 m^{2})

Design and construction
- Architect: Skidmore, Owings and Merrill
- Main contractor: Hoffman Construction

One Main Place is a privately owned commercial office building in Downtown Portland, in the U.S. state of Oregon. Located at the west end of the Hawthorne Bridge, the 20-story skyscraper is 270 feet (82 m) tall. Completed in 1982, it is the fifteenth tallest building in Portland, and the sixteenth largest by square footage. Designed in the modern style by Skidmore, Owings and Merrill, it is a concrete and glass tower.

== History ==
The structure was designed by architectural firm Skidmore, Owings and Merrill and built by Hoffman Construction Company, with completion coming in 1982. One Main Place was acquired by the Equitable Life Assurance Society from Marathon Realty U.S. for $35 million in 1995. The pension fund for Los Angeles' police and fire departments bought the office tower in December 1998 for $44.5 million, after having owned 10 percent of the building since the 1995 sale. RREEF Realty Investments (part of Deutsche Bank) purchased the building in 2006 for $69.3 million, and then sold it in January 2010 to KBS REIT II for a reported $57 million. RREEF had attempted to sell the office tower in 2009, but halted efforts in October after bids were lower than anticipated. The deal on the building was anticipated to close in April, but was completed early in February. KBS sold the building in 2014 to New York Life for $86.3 million.

== Details ==
One Main Place is 20 stories tall and has 353,000 square feet (32,800 m^{2}) of space. The building has 292,971 square feet (27,217.9 m^{2}) of leasable space, making it by area the 16th largest in Portland. Designed in the modern style, the 270-foot (82 m) tall structure is used for class A commercial office space. The concrete building utilizes a curtain wall. The World Trade Center is directly north and east, while First & Main lies adjacent to the south.

Tenants include law firms, Banner Bank, Yellowpages.com, and Tripwire, a software developer, among others. Tripwire and the Education Northwest are the largest tenants, with the former occupying 32,000 square feet (3,000 m^{2}) of space and Education Northwest taking up almost 50,000 square feet (4,600 m^{2}). The building is decorated each year during the winter holidays, utilizing a different theme each year and using a fireplace located in the lobby as part of the theme. These decorations won a local award in 2002 for its "Home for the Holidays" theme.

The region's transit agency, TriMet, moved its administrative headquarters into One Main Place in 2023.
