= Sho Dozono =

Japanese-American businessman

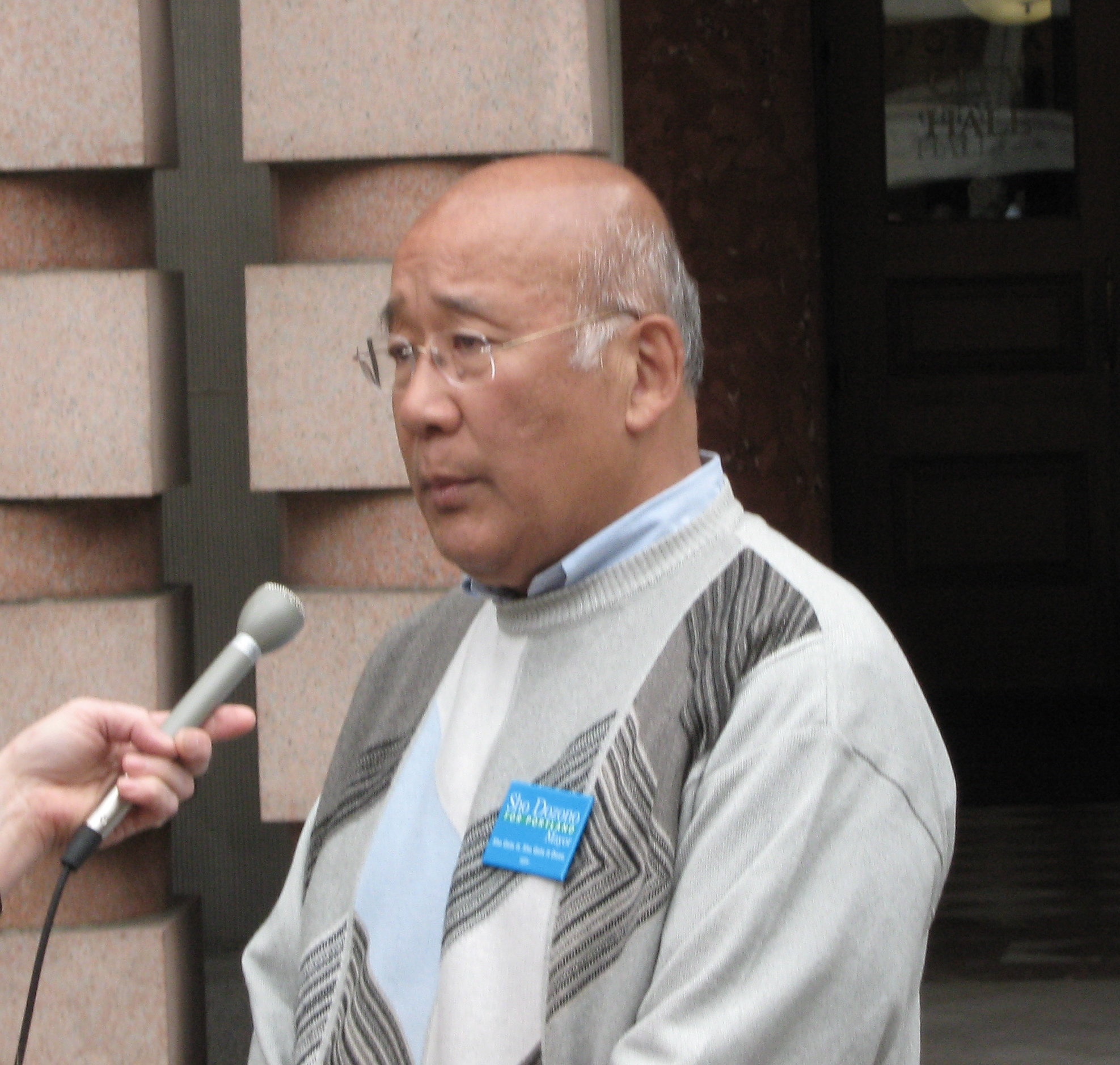
- Sho Dozono speaking to reporters outside Portland City Hall
- Born: 1944 (age 81–82); Japan
- Education: University of Washington (B.A.); Portland State University (M.E.)
- Occupations: Business owner, CEO

Sho Dozono (born 1944) is a Japanese-American businessman and former political candidate from Portland, Oregon. He was a candidate in the 2008 Portland mayoral race. Portland City Commissioner Sam Adams was the front runner throughout the race. Dozono, who would have faced Adams again in November if neither candidate had cleared 50%, lost to him in the primary when Adams won 58% of the vote.

A prominent member of the Portland business community, Dozono served as chairman of the chamber of commerce, and he has been the CEO and owner of the regional travel agency Azumano Travel since 1987. He has not previously held public office, but was considered one of the top two candidates. Dozono ran on a platform centering on fiscal responsibility and his history of civic and educational activism. Dozono was denied public campaign financing, and scrutiny was directed at his financial history.

== Personal life and career ==
Sho Dozono is Japanese American. He was born in Japan, and his family moved to Portland when he was 10. He attended Cleveland High School and received a B.A. in education and history from the University of Washington. After a three-year period with the U.S. Army, Dozono went on to earn a master's degree in education from Portland State University and taught social studies for five years at Grant High School. In 1976, Dozono joined his father-in-law's business, Azumano Travel. He became president in 1981 and owner in 1987. Azumano has 215 agents in three states and holds several large corporate and government travel contracts. Dozono and his wife Loen have five children.

=== Community service ===
Dozono has a long history of participating in community and business activities in Portland and serving on organizational boards. In 1996, he organized a 30,000-person march in support of funding for the Portland Public Schools. He also established the Portland Schools Foundation, a private fundraising organization. Following the September 11, 2001 attacks, Dozono organized the "Flight for Freedom", a group of Oregonians who flew to New York City to support the city's tourist economy, in response to a plea by Mayor Rudy Giuliani. The trip was led by Vera Katz, who was then Portland's mayor. Initially Dozono had only expected 200 people to participate, but estimates of the number of participants ranged from 800 to more than 1000. Similar "Flight of Friendship" trips were organized to Thailand following the 2004 tsunami and to New Orleans in the wake of Hurricane Katrina. In 2002, Dozono was instrumental in bringing the Olympic Torch to Portland.

== Mayoral election race ==
I'm not a politician, and I don't intend to become one at my age.

— Sho Dozono,

Dozono has not previously held public office, and was recruited by Portland business and civic leaders to run for mayor. Incumbent mayor Tom Potter endorsed Dozono's candidacy, as did the Multnomah County Republican Party. Throughout the campaign, Dozono primarily emphasized his experience as a businessman, and ran on a platform of general fiscal responsibility. The Oregonian described him as progressive on social issues such as gay rights, public safety, race and class. Multiple news sources criticized Dozono for failing to speak on detailed policy issues in his campaign.

More than a dozen candidates ran in the Portland race, but news outlets called Dozono the only candidate to provide a serious challenge to front-runner Sam Adams. An automated telephone poll of approximately 600 Portland residents in early April suggested that Dozono was within a percentage point of Adams in supporters. In the official results of the vote, Dozono garnered the second most votes of any candidate, around 34%, while Adams won with over 50%. Winning over 50% ensures that no run off vote is required in November to confirm the result. According to Dozono's campaign manager, it is not expected that he will run for office again.

=== Campaign financing ===
Following a lawsuit, a judge reversed the Portland City Auditor's decision to award Dozono public financing, and found Dozono in violation of the city's campaign finance law. At issue was a poll testing Dozono's electability, which a lobbyist had conducted on Dozono's behalf in December 2007, the month before he officially announced his candidacy. Dozono was subsequently denied $161,171 in public funds as a result of the judge's ruling. Dozono continued in the race despite the lack of public financing, and stated that he would cap individual contributions to his campaign at $500, similar to a limit set by Adams.

=== Financial history ===
Although fiscal responsibility was a central theme of Dozono's campaign, a March 2008 story by The Oregonian noted issues that had been raised about Dozono's business dealings during his 20-year career. The report stated that Dozono had occasionally mixed friendship with business, by accepting loans from personal connections for his travel agency, and raised ethical questions about Dozono's involvement in several business dealings, one of which resulted in a lawsuit and an $800,000 settlement. These questions had previously been raised in an investigative report by Nigel Jaquiss in the Willamette Week six years earlier, which also alleged that Dozono had borrowed $1.25 million against the trust fund of his best friend's son Yuri Ohno, to companies he controlled, an amount that was subsequently repaid with interest.

In April, it became public that Dozono owed the City of Portland more than $18,000 in back rent on a downtown restaurant which he owns. Several sources cited the incident as a contradiction to his claim to fiscal responsibility. In a press conference on the first of May, Dozono displayed checks intended to pay the amount owed and stated that the withheld rent was an intentional act meant to be used as leverage in negotiations with the city over nearby construction and lack of parking. The amount was later paid in full.

== See also ==
- Government of Portland, Oregon
