= First & Main =

Building in Portland, Oregon, U.S.

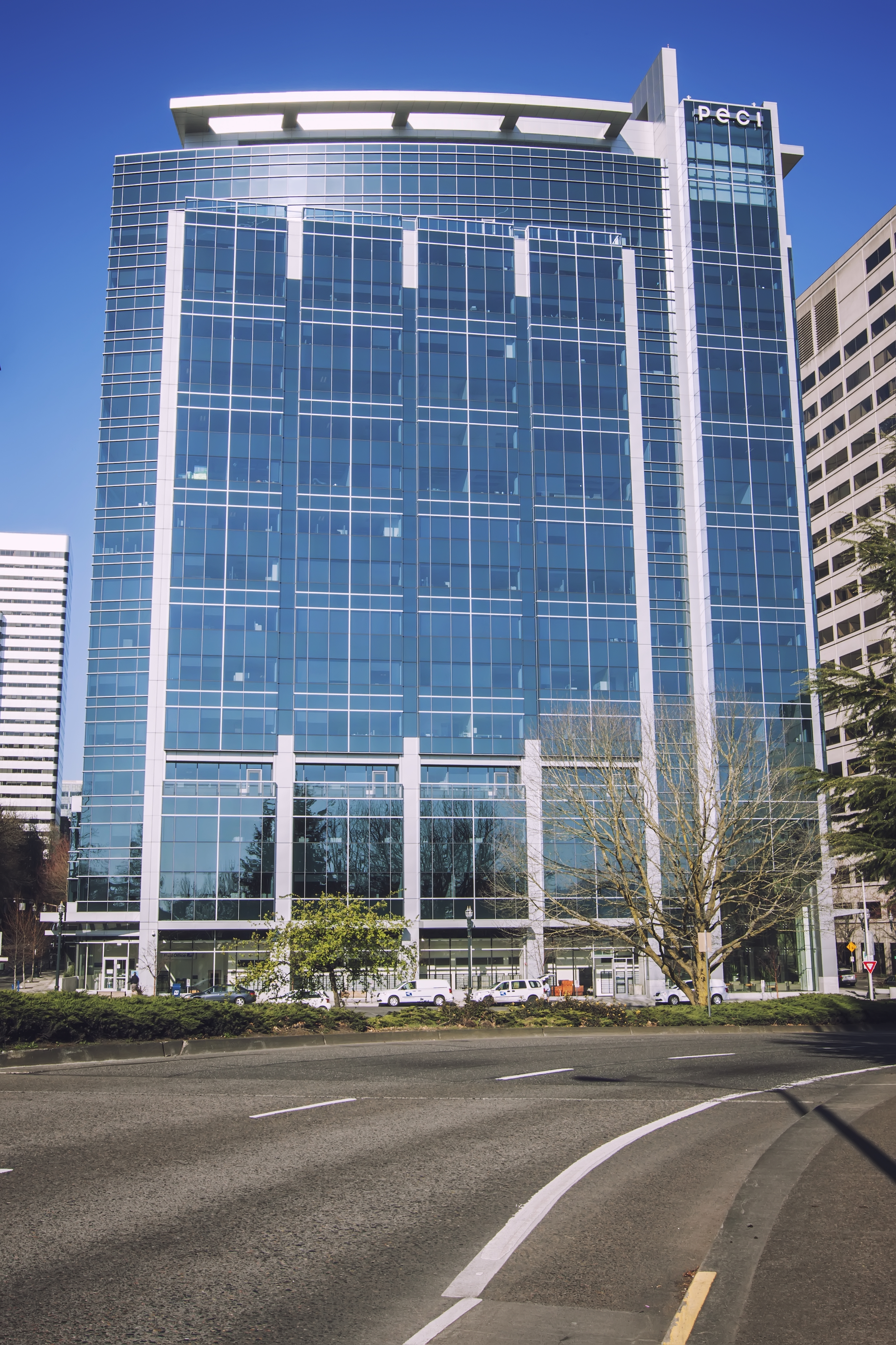
- The building's exterior, 2015

- Location within Portland, Oregon

General information
- Type: Commercial offices
- Location: 100 SW Main Street; Portland, Oregon
- Coordinates: 45.5148°N 122.6755°W
- Completed: 2010
- Cost: US$100 million
- Owner: American Assets Trust Inc.

Height
- Roof: 210.34 ft (64.11 m)

Technical details
- Floor count: 17
- Floor area: 366,500 sq ft (34,050 m^{2})
- Lifts/elevators: 8

Design and construction
- Architect: GBD Architects
- Developer: Shorenstein Properties
- Main contractor: Hoffman Construction

First & Main is a 17-story, 210.34 ft (64.11 m) office tower in downtown Portland, Oregon, at First and Main streets. The building was completed in 2010 at a cost of $100 million with Hoffman Construction Company as the general contractor for developer Shorenstein Properties.

== History ==
The land the building occupies was previously a surface parking lot, long considered a potential location for a new Multnomah County Courthouse. In 2005, the property was purchased by EQ Office, which in turn was bought by The Blackstone Group, which sold the property to Shorenstein Properties. Construction began on the $100 million building in March 2007, and the county at that time hoped to have an underground connection between the Justice Center and a proposed new courthouse site next to the Hawthorne Bridge, through what is now the First & Main site. Excavation work began in September 2007 and a construction crane was erected at the site in April 2008. Early estimates had construction finishing in 2011.

First & Main topped-off in February 2009, and became the first office tower built in the city since 2000, when the Fox Tower was completed. In February 2010, the federal General Services Administration leased 70 percent of the yet-to-be-completed building to house federal workers during the renovations to the Edith Green – Wendell Wyatt Federal Building. First & Main opened in the middle of 2010, after the structural construction finished in April. The building earned Leadership in Energy and Environmental Design (LEED) platinum status from the U.S. Green Building Council in 2010 for the core and shell.

Developer Shorenstein Properties sold the building for $129 million in March 2011 to American Assets Trust. The building earned Gold LEED certification from the U.S. Green Building Council in 2012 for its sustainability on interior spaces. The owners had originally sought platinum status for the building. The building reached full occupancy in March 2013. CLEAResult leased nearly 102,000 square feet (9,500 m^{2}) in 2014 in the building.

== Details ==
The tower has 17 above-ground floors, and three floors of underground parking. Overall, the building has 366,500 square feet (34,050 m^{2}) of space, of which 20,000 square feet (1,900 m^{2}) is ground-floor retail. Located between Madison and Main streets, and First and Second avenues, the building is directly south of One Main Place and is also adjacent to the Justice Center, located across Second, to the west. The steel tower with a glass curtain was designed by GBD Architects and built by Hoffman Construction. Shorenstein Properties and Gerding Edlen Development developed the project.

== See also ==
- Architecture of Portland, Oregon
