= C.B. Blethen Award =

Award for journalism in the United States

The C.B. Blethen Award honors the best journalist in the northwest United States. C. B. Blethen was publisher of The Seattle Times from 1915 until his death in 1941.
