= Sam Adams (Oregon politician) =

American politician (born 1963)

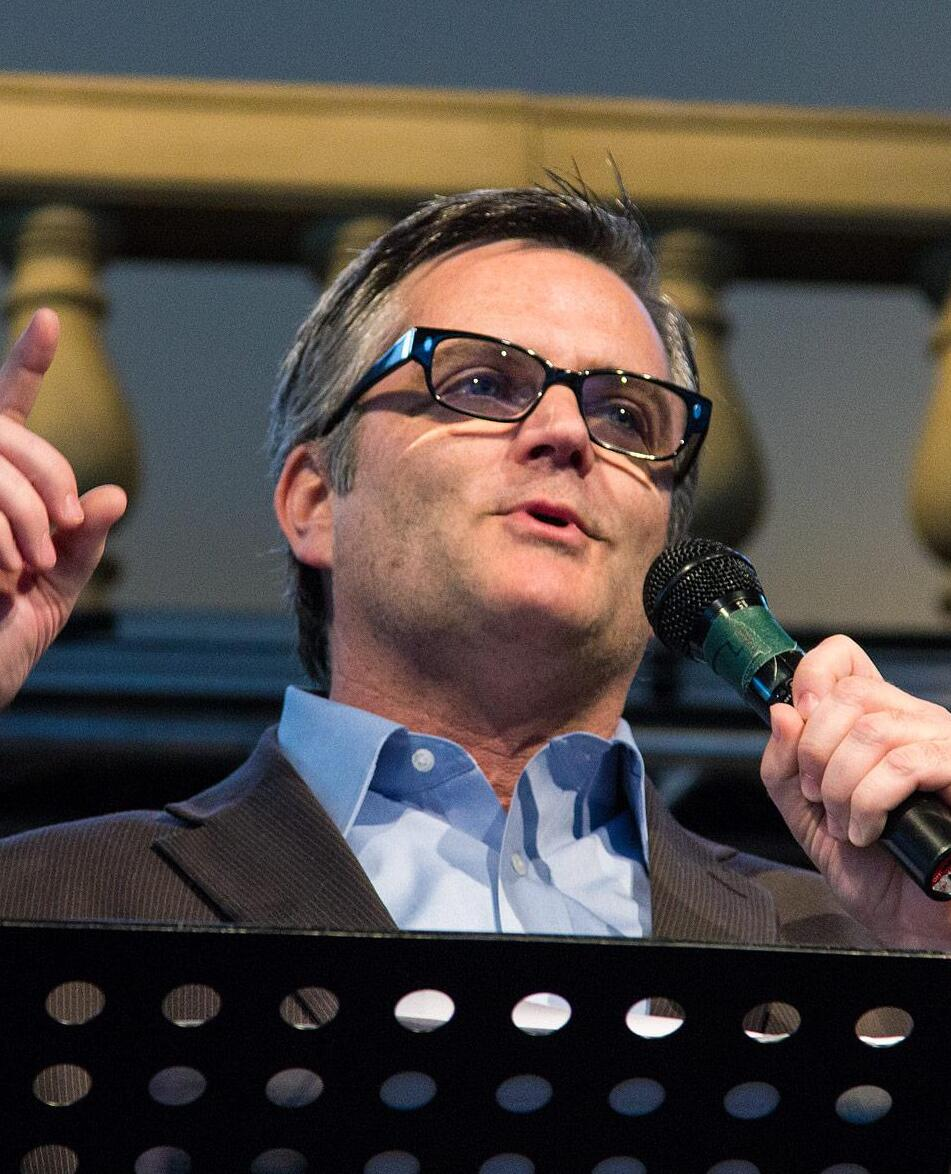
- Adams in 2012

51st Mayor of Portland
- In office January 1, 2009 – January 1, 2013
- Preceded by: Tom Potter
- Succeeded by: Charlie Hales

Portland City Commissioner
- In office January 1, 2005 – January 1, 2009
- Preceded by: Jim Francesconi
- Succeeded by: Amanda Fritz

Personal details
- Born: Samuel Francis Adams; September 3, 1963 (age 63) Butte, Montana, U.S.
- Party: Democratic
- Domestic partner: Peter Zuckerman (2008–present)
- Education: University of Oregon (BA)
- Occupation: Politician

Samuel Francis Adams (born September 3, 1963) is an American politician in Portland, Oregon. Adams was mayor of Portland from 2009 to 2012 and previously served on the Portland City Council and as chief of staff to former Mayor Vera Katz. Adams was the first openly gay mayor of a large U.S. city.

== Early life and education ==
Samuel Adams was born in Butte, Montana, to parents Larry and Karalie Adams. Adams was the third of four children. When he was a year old, his family moved to Richland, Washington, but shortly after moved to Newport, Oregon. Adams graduated from high school in 1982, then started at the University of Oregon in 1984. Adams did not graduate from college until 2002, when he earned a Bachelor of Arts degree from the University of Oregon in political science.

== Early career ==
Adams began his career in politics as a staffer on Peter DeFazio's 1984 campaign for the U.S. House of Representatives in Oregon's 4th district. He dropped out of the University of Oregon to work on Peter DeFazio's successful bid for Congress. After DeFazio won, Adams worked as a communications and policy assistant in his Oregon office, and on his re-election campaigns until 1988. Adams also worked for Democratic Majority Leaders David Dix and Carl Hosticka.

In 1988, Adams was elected chair of the Lane County (Oregon) Democratic Party. In 1990, Adams worked as the Oregon director for the highway safety organization Citizens for Reliable and Safe Highways (CRASH). He next worked on Vera Katz's 1992 mayoral campaign in Portland and served as her chief of staff 11 years.

=== Portland City Council ===
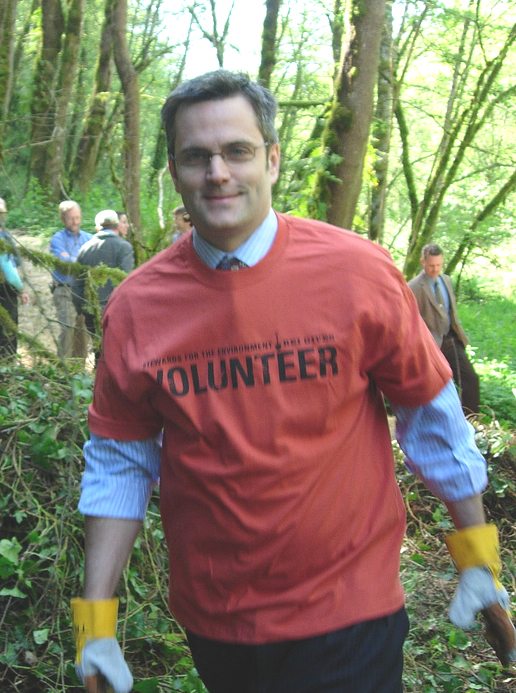
Adams at a "Green space" event in 2005

In a 2004 election for a seat on the Portland City Council, Adams received fewer votes than candidate Nick Fish in the primary election, but Adams won the general election.

Adams ran an unsuccessful campaign to rejoin city council in 2020. From 2020 to 2023, he served as director of strategic innovations for the office of Portland Mayor Ted Wheeler.

As city commissioner, ran the Portland Bureau of Transportation and the Portland Bureau of Environmental Services. He also served as Portland City Council's liaison to the Arts and Culture and Small Business communities. As part of managing the Bureau of Transportation, he inherited the responsibility to oversee the development of the Portland Aerial Tram, which opened to the public in January 2007.

Adams and his staff maintained a blog highlighting their activities in the community, especially pertaining to Adams's priorities such as arts and culture, livability and environment, and transportation.

== Mayor of Portland ==
=== 2008 mayoral campaign ===
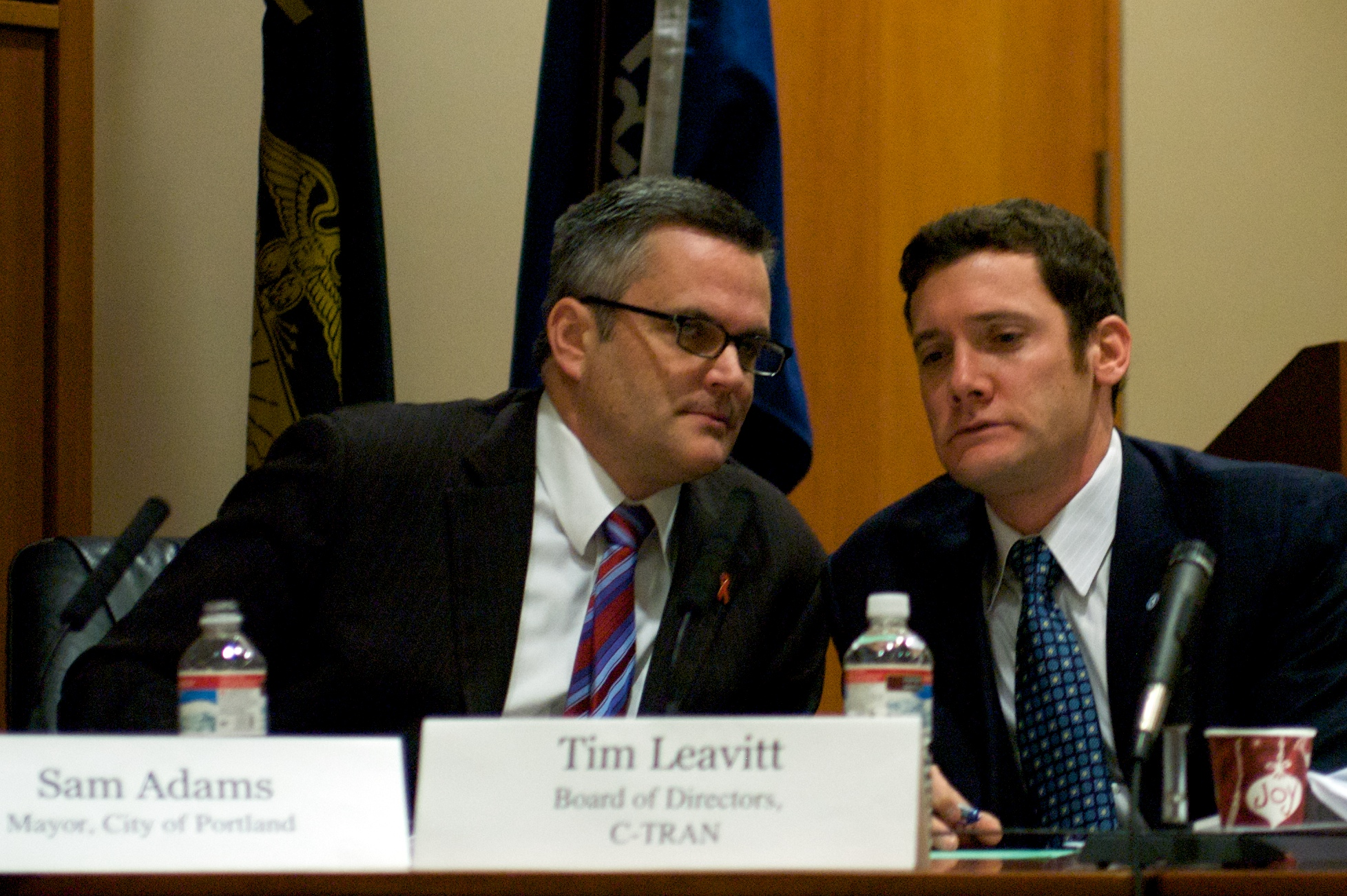
Adams and C-Tran director Tim Leavitt at a meeting of the Columbia River Crossing Project

In October 2007, Adams announced his intentions to run for Mayor of Portland. His main opponent was Sho Dozono, a civic leader and businessman. In the primary election, held May 20, 2008, Adams won 58 percent of the vote and was elected without the need for a run-off. Dozono received 34 percent of the vote. Adams took office on January 1, 2009, becoming the first openly gay mayor of a major U.S. city.

Adams said his top three priorities were creating more family-wage jobs, reducing the high school dropout rate, and making Portland more sustainable.

In his first State of the City address on February 27, 2009, Adams outlined his goal of making Portland "the most sustainable city in the world." Adams emphasized reduction of carbon dioxide emissions and investment in efficient green energy as essential to the city's energy-environmental goals and called on the Oregon State Legislature to provide incentives for the expansion of green energy companies, notably Vestas Wind Systems, into the Portland metropolitan area.

In 2009, Adams established a local economic stimulus plan by fast-tracking capital improvement projects, helped secure a Major League Soccer franchise, began work on the Oregon Sustainability Center established a free-bus-ride program designed for low-income students, secured $2.5 million in grants designed to help the city reduce diesel emissions, began construction of 15 miles of bike boulevards, and consolidated the city's permitting process.

In September 2009, Adams opposed the $4 billion, twelve-lane replacement for the I-5 bridge over the Columbia River, a plan he had once supported. Adams stated, "I'd rather settle for a bad bridge for another 25 years than a terrible bridge that punishes Portland for another 100 years." The twelve-lane idea was a compromise deal Adams helped write with then-Mayor Royce Pollard of Vancouver, Washington, in February 2009. The deal helped get the Portland City Council to agree for a bridge of up to twelve lanes, something Vancouver wanted in exchange for its support of Portland's MAX Light Rail extension across the I-5 bridge. Adams focused on improving the local economy by attracting large, sustainable employers to Portland, including a $200-million investment by the company Vestas.

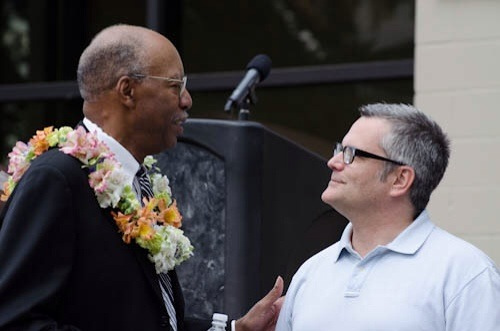
Adams and Charles Jordan, 2012

In November of that year, Adams fired the police chief and then fired a police officer who had shot and killed an unarmed citizen. He recruited a wind company to spend $66 million on development and hire 400 employees, established the city's first economic development plan, developed programs designed to reduce Portland's high school dropout rate and make the city more sustainable, and, along with the rest of the city council, adopted gun control regulations that are designed to reduce shootings.

In 2011, Adams helped establish curbside composting, led a ban on single-use plastic bags, adopted a transgender-inclusive health plan for city employees, recruited a photovoltaic company to move to and invest $340 million in infrastructure in Portland, recruited several TV and movie companies to do business and spend about $100 million on production in Portland, established a $2.1 million seed fund to help start-up businesses in Portland, supported Occupy Portland at first, but later dispersed the camps, and cracked down on gangs with a 14-month police undercover operation that resulted in the arrests of 31 gang members.

On July 29, 2011, Adams announced on his official city blog that he would not seek a second term as Portland's mayor. He had an approval rating of 56%.

== Later career ==
Days after his last day as Mayor, Adams was named executive director of the City Club of Portland, a non-profit organization best known as the host of public civic policy meetings. On January 14, 2014, Adams announced that he was leaving the City Club to become director of U.S. Climate Initiatives at the World Resources Institute, a global nonprofit dedicated to environmental sustainability. Adams moved to Washington, D.C., as a result.

=== Return to Portland politics ===
In 2020, Adams returned to Portland and ran for City Council, but lost in the May primary. In February 2021, he became the director of strategic innovations for mayor Ted Wheeler. In that role, Adams's goal was revitalizing the city after the coronavirus pandemic and protests. Adams led initiatives in 2021 and 2022 to ban homeless camping, and in a memo he said the city should use of executive power to end unsanctioned camping move houseless people into in mass shelters of 3,000 people, staffed by the National Guard, and ask the 'Federal Emergency Management Agency' to declare homelessness a federal emergency eligible to receive federal funds. The city later voted to end unsanctioned camping, but only during the day, and the ban has not been widely enforced. On January 3, 2023, Adams was credited with cleaning up the "deadliest block" in Portland. On January 10, 2023, Adams resigned from his office, citing health problems due to chronic anemia that was getting worse. Wheeler signed off on Adams resignation and initially praised Adams for his work, but in a press conference several days later, Wheeler asserted that he had forced Adams to leave because Adams had repeatedly intimidated female employees. Adams was not told about the complaints and none of the allegations were investigated. Adams has retained an attorney to contest the details of his departure.

In early 2024 Adams was discussing plans to run for city council or a Multnomah County District seat. On February 26 he announced he would run for the Multnomah County Board of Commissioners in district 2, representing North and Northeast Portland. He said his priorities are ending unsanctioned outdoor homelessness, building a more humane and effective system for addiction and mental health treatment, stopping gun violence and crime, and building affordable housing. Adams finished second in the May primary, advancing to a November runoff election against Shannon Singleton.

== Personal life ==
Because of the Irish birth of his maternal grandfather, Adams holds dual Irish and American citizenship.

Adams had a recurring role on the IFC show Portlandia as assistant to Portland's fictional mayor played by Kyle MacLachlan. He also appeared as himself in a 2012 episode of the Portland-based NBC show Grimm.

Adams, who is gay, remained closeted at work until he became Mayor Vera Katz's Chief of Staff in 1993. He broke the news to Katz for the first time in 1992 after she offered him the job as her campaign manager, to which she replied "Sweetie, I don't give a damn." In discussing not disclosing his sexuality, Adams noted he came from a "family of tough Montanans" where "there's a premium on being tough and strong, and being queer and a faggot wasn't strong."

From 1992 until 2004, Adams was in a long-term relationship with Greg Eddie. During that time, in 1993, he was outed as gay by the alternative newspaper Willamette Week. In 2007, the former couple, in a challenge to the state constitution, filed suit against the State of Oregon to dissolve their domestic partnership and divide Adams's future pension.

Adams met his partner Peter Zuckerman, a journalist and author, in 2008.

In 2005, Adams met Beau Breedlove, a 17-year-old interning for Oregon State Representative Kim Thatcher. In September 2007, Adams denied rumors of a sexual relationship between the two, saying of Breedlove, "He was looking for a mentor. I tried to be both prudent and useful to him." In January 2009, after being confronted with a story in Willamette Week, Adams admitted to having a sexual relationship with Breedlove. Breedlove confirmed Adams's accounts. Adams apologized, saying he had lied to avoid accusations of grooming a minor and the likely disruption such allegations would cause in his mayoral campaign. Adams announced his intention to remain in office.

Oregon Attorney General John Kroger initiated a criminal investigation in January 2009. By June, Kroger's office announced that no charges would be filed and that there was "no credible evidence" of inappropriate sexual contact before the age of consent. Before Kroger's findings were made public, several newspapers called for Adams's resignation. The Portland Mercury and the board of the Portland Area Business Association, the LGBTQ chamber of commerce, spoke out against resignation. Out magazine columnist Dan Savage noted what he saw as hypocrisy, homophobia, and sex panic about age disparity in sexual relationships. In July 2009 a recall campaign asserted that Adams had lost the trust of the public and other elected officials to ill effect on the city's economy. It fell short of gathering the necessary number of signatures. A second effort began in late 2009, with financial backing from over a dozen regional businesses. The backers posited that a "lack of trust and political capital" was affecting their businesses' bottom lines. However, it too failed due to lack of sufficient signatures.

In November 2017, Adams was accused of repeated sexual harassment by a former aide between 2008 and 2012. Adams denied the allegations. In 2019, Willamette Week interviewed 10 staffers who were present at the time relating to the allegations and found "none say they believe Adams had sexually harassed Gonzalez." In 2021, Adams was cleared of the harassment allegations through an investigation by the city's human resources department.

== Filmography ==
Year	Title	Character	Episode(s)
2011	Have You Heard? with Byron Beck	Self	"At Home with Storm Large"
2011–2018	Portlandia	Sam, Mayor's Assistant	"A Song for Portland" (2011) "A Mayor Is Missing" (2011) "Cops Redesign" (2012) "No Olympics" (2012) "The Brunch Special" (2012) "Off the Grid" (2013) "The Temp" (2013) "3D Printer" (2014) "4th of July" (2015) "First Feminist City" (2016) "Noodle Monster" (2016) "Open Relationship" (2018) "Most Pro City" (2018) "Rose Route" (2018)
2012	Vancouvria	Photo Extra	"Big City Survival Class"
2012	Wheel of Fortune	Self	"Wheel of Fortune from Portland" "Going Green from Portland 2" "Going Green from Portland 3"
2012	Grimm	Self	"The Hour of Death"

== See also ==
- List of LGBT people from Portland, Oregon

Political offices
Preceded by Tom Potter	Mayor of Portland, Oregon; 2009–2012	Succeeded by Charlie Hales
