= Portland Book Festival =

Annual literary festival

- Status: Active
- Genre: Events
- Frequency: Annually
- Location: Portland, Oregon
- Country: United States
- Founded: 2005
- Major events: Festival
- Sponsor: Literary Arts, Inc.
- Website: literary-arts.org/what-we-do/pdxbookfest/

Portland Book Festival (formerly Wordstock) is an annual literary festival held in Portland, Oregon, United States. The festival started in 2005, and is the largest festival of its kind in the Pacific Northwest. Events include author readings, writing contests and workshops, exhibits, and a book fair.

== Background ==
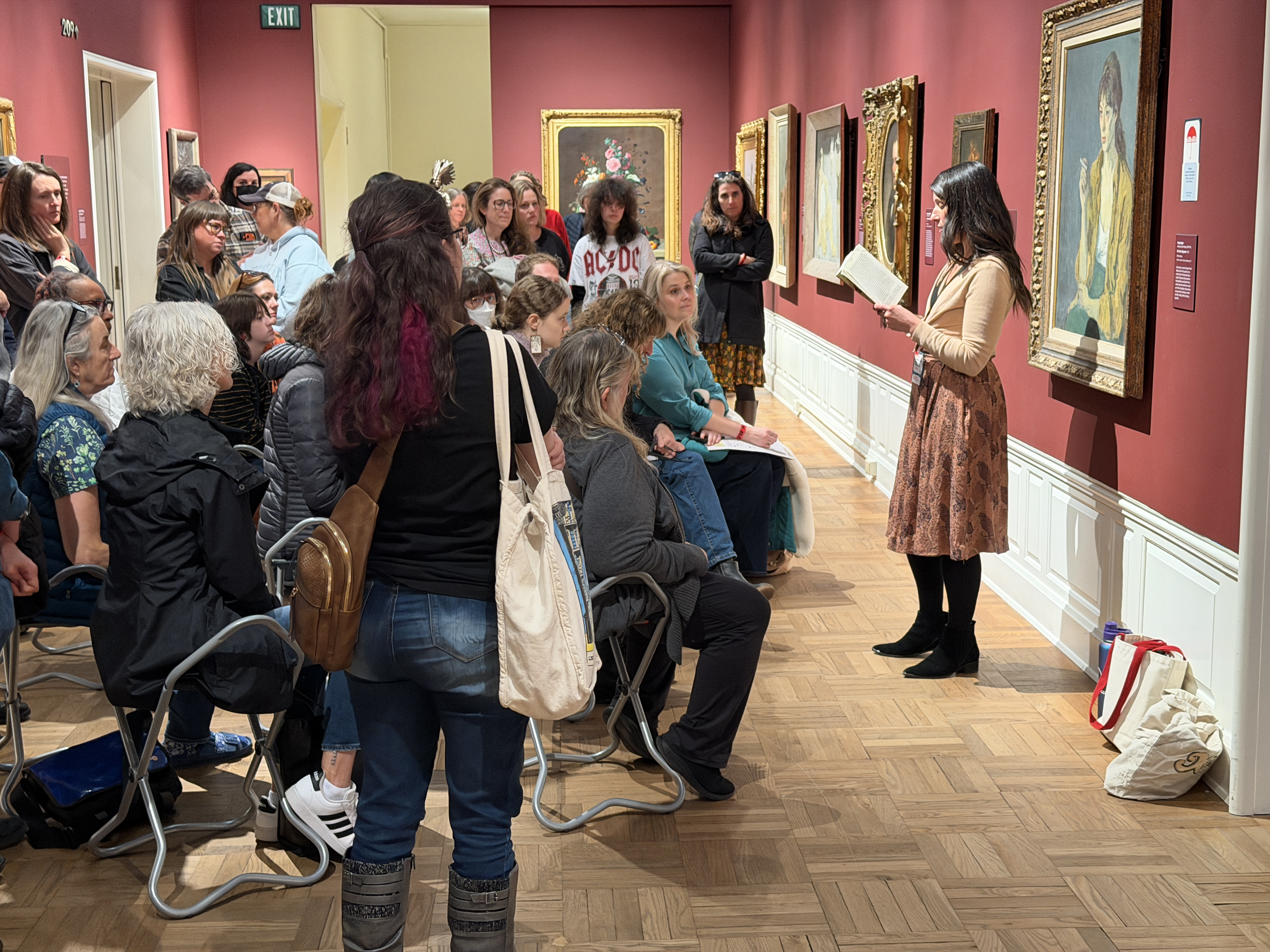
Karleigh Frisbie Brogan does a reading at the Portland Art Museum during the Portland Book Festival on Nov. 8, 2025.

The festival, founded in 2005 by writer Larry Colton, is held by the non-profit Literary Arts, which also sponsors the Oregon Book Award. Venues include the Portland Art Museum, First Congregational United Church of Christ, The Old Church, the Oregon Historical Society, the Northwest Film Center, the Brunish Theatre, the Winningstad Theatre, and the Arlene Schnitzer Concert Hall. The Northwest Film Center collaborates with Literary Arts, sponsoring film screenings with writers discussing films that have influenced their works.

== See also ==
- Culture of Portland, Oregon
