= Mago Hermano (Brother Wizard or Magician) =

Sculpture at Antoinette Hatfield Hall, Portland, Oregon

- The sculpture in December 2014

- Location in Portland, Oregon
- Artist: Alejandro Colunga
- Year: 2003
- Type: Sculpture
- Medium: Bronze; steel
- Location: Portland, Oregon, United States; 45.51661°N 122.68153°W
- Owner: City of Portland and Multnomah County Public Art Collection courtesy of the Regional Arts & Culture Council

Mago Hermano (Brother Wizard or Magician) is a 2003 bronze and steel sculpture by Mexican artist Alejandro Colunga, located in the lobby of Antoinette Hatfield Hall (part of Portland Center for the Performing Arts), at 1111 Southwest Broadway, in Portland, Oregon, United States.

== Description and history ==
According to the Regional Arts & Culture Council, which administers the work, Mago Hermano is a gift from Fernando Garza Martinez as the mayor of Guadalajara to Vera Katz as the mayor of Portland, and the Portland-Guadalajara Sister City Association, to commemorate the twentieth anniversary of the sister cities. It is part of the City of Portland and Multnomah County Public Art Collection courtesy of the Regional Arts & Culture Council.

== See also ==
- 2003 in art
