= Colunga (disambiguation) =

Colunga may refer to:

In people:

- Alejandro Colunga, a Mexican painter and sculptor
- Fernando Colunga, a Mexican actor
- Adrián Colunga, a Spanish footballer

In places:

- Colunga, a municipality in Asturias, Spain
- Colunga (parish), in Asturias, Spain
