= Portland Opera =

Opera company in Portland, Oregon, United States

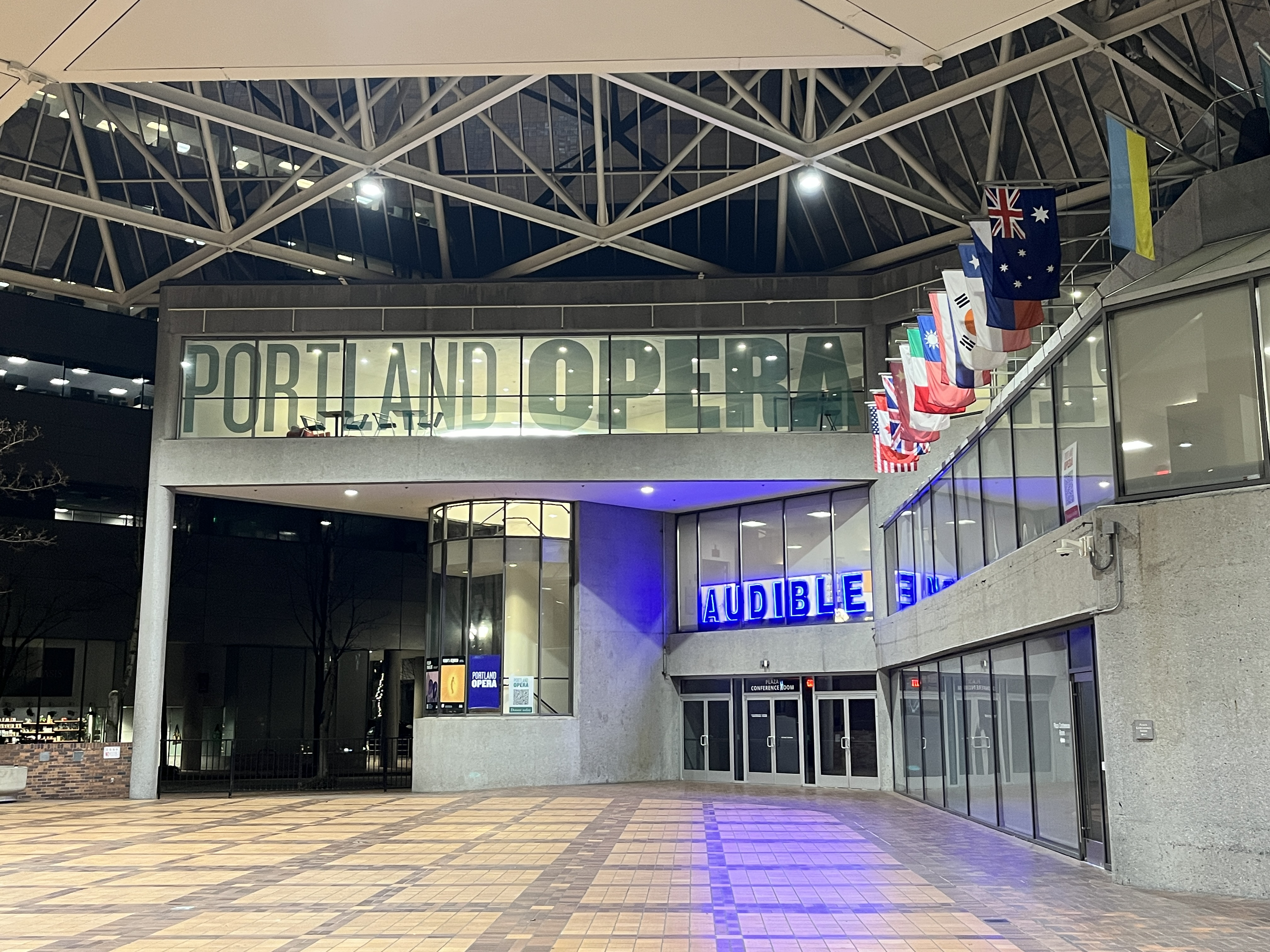
Office at World Trade Center, 2026

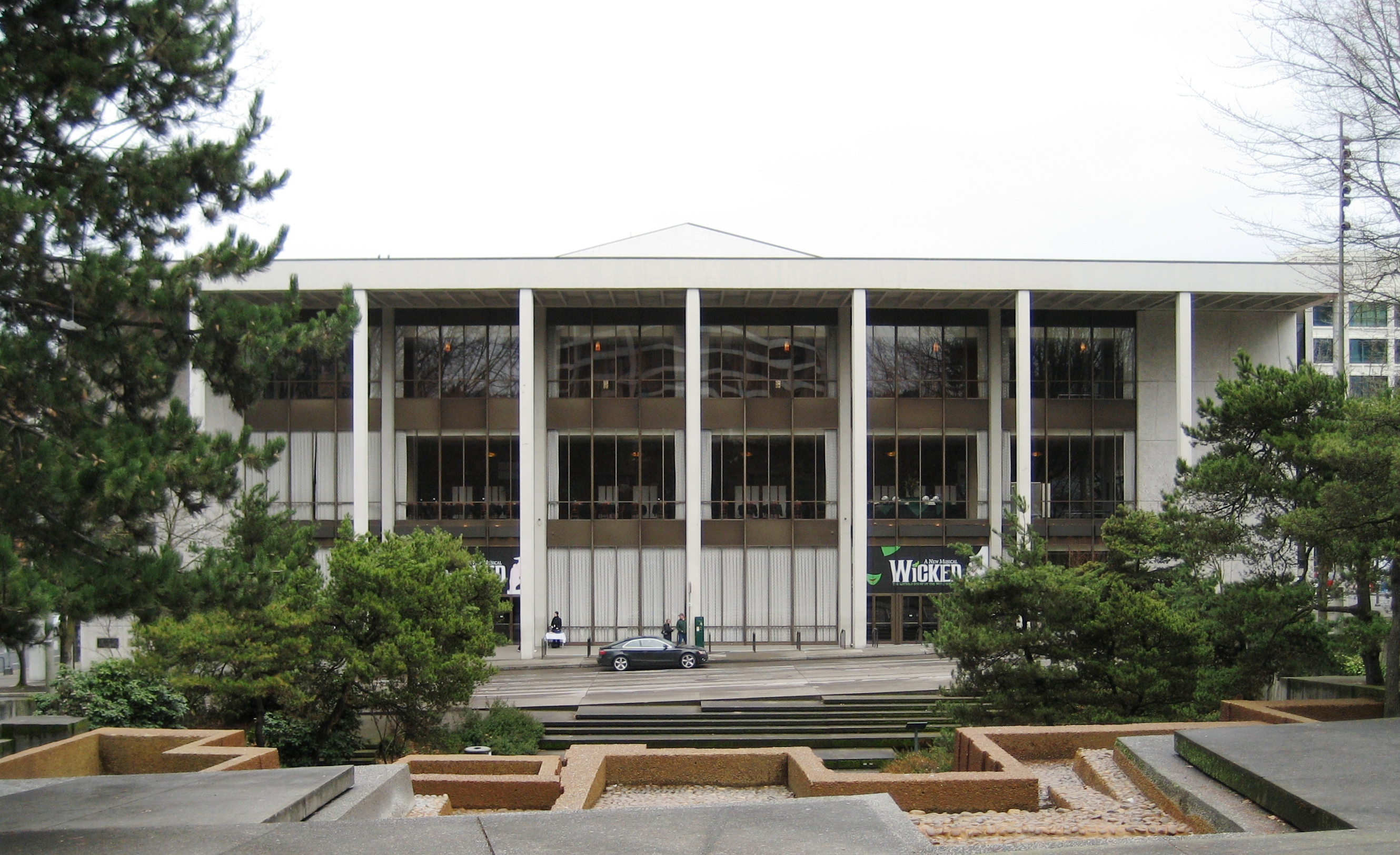
The Keller Auditorium, Portland Opera's principal performance venue

Portland Opera is an American opera company based in Portland, Oregon. Its performances take place in the Keller Auditorium and Newmark Theatre, both part of the Portland Center for the Performing Arts. Portland Opera also produces a separate subscription series of touring Broadway musicals, which also take place at the Keller Auditorium.

== History ==
Portland Opera was founded as the Portland Opera Association in 1964 by the conductor Henry Holt, and the first recreation director of Portland Parks & Recreation, Dorothea Marie Lensch, was a founding member. Its first performance was Strauss' Die Fledermaus, the only opera presented that season. Holt served as the company's General Director for the first two years of existence. The next General Director post was the Austrian conductor Herbert Weiskopf, who died of a heart attack in March 1970 after conducting a performance of Lucia di Lammermoor. The conductor Stefan Minde then took over as General Director and served until 1984, followed by Robert Bailey, a stage director, and National Public Radio's first Director of Culture Programming, who served until 2003. Stage Director Christopher Mattaliano succeeded Robert Bailey as General Director in 2003 and served through 2019.

The current General Director is Susan (Sue) Dixon, who was appointed in October 2019, and is the first female general director in the opera's 56 year history. The most recent Music Director was George Manahan, who held the post from 2012 to 2021. In September 2021, the company announced the appointment of Damien Geter as its interim music director, with immediate effect.

Portland Opera was one of the first opera companies to introduce surtitles in its productions, and has presented several world and US premieres. In October 2014, the company announced changes in the format of its productions, by presenting some productions in the Keller Auditorium and others as a part of a summer festival format, with three operas produced in the Newmark Theatre.

As part of the COVID-19 pandemic, the Portland Opera Association received $1 million in federally backed small business loan from First Republic Bank as part of the Paycheck Protection Program. The opera stated it would allow them to retain 73 jobs.

== Premieres ==
Portland Opera's premiere performances include:

- Bernard Herrmann: Wuthering Heights (1982, world premiere of an abridged version)
- Christopher Drobny: Lucy's Lapses (1990, world premiere)
- Reynaldo Hahn: Le marchand de Venise (The Merchant of Venice) (1996, US premiere)
- William Bolcom: A View from the Bridge (2003, US West Coast premiere)

== See also ==
- Culture of Portland, Oregon
