= Antoinette Hatfield Hall =

Theater in Portland, Oregon

- New Theatre Building
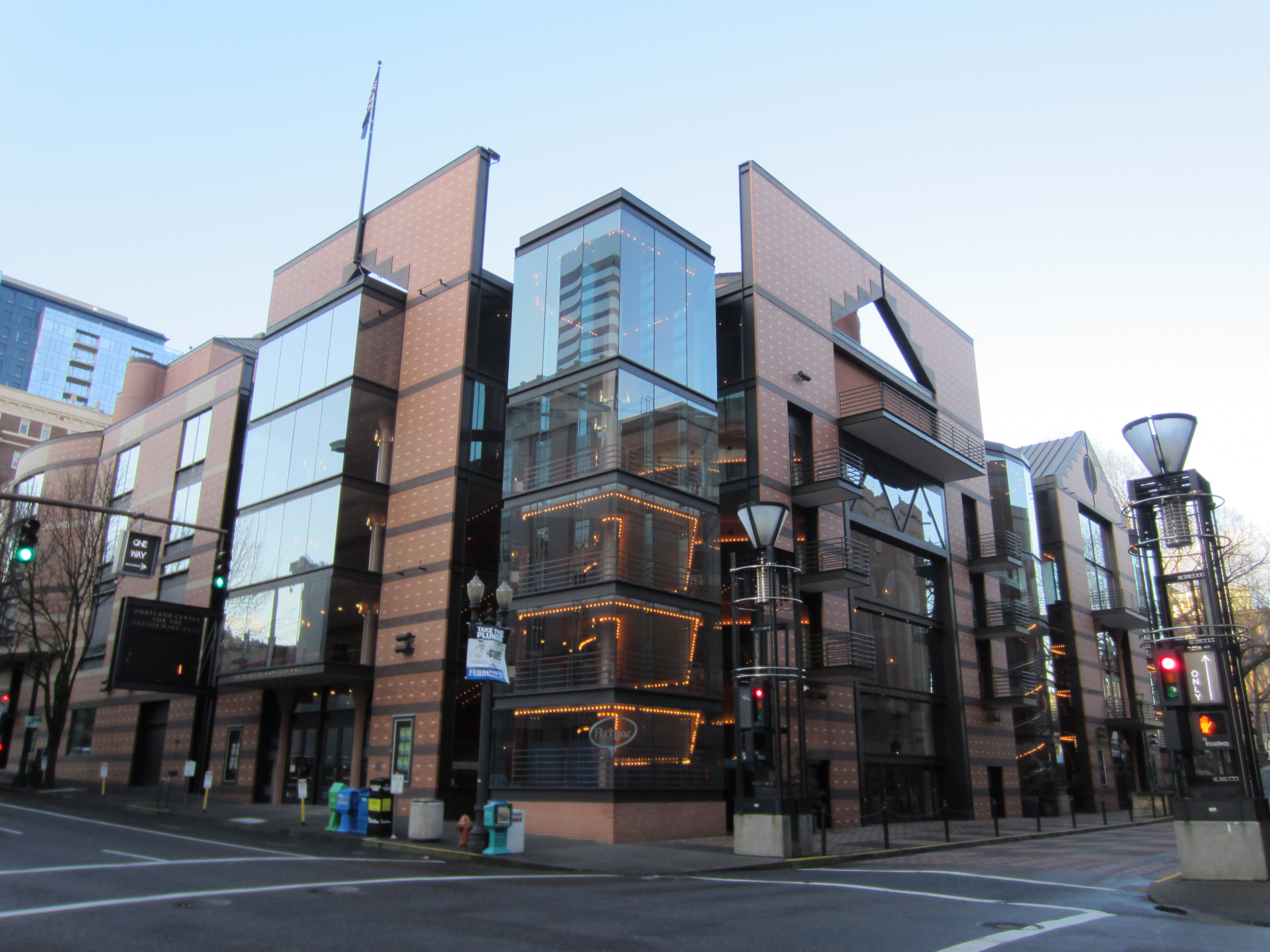
- The building's exterior in 2012
- Interactive map of Antoinette Hatfield Hall
- Address: 1111 Southwest Broadway; Portland, Oregon; United States
- Coordinates: 45.5166°N 122.6817°W
- Owner: City of Portland
- Operator: Portland's Centers for the Arts
- Capacity: Newmark: 880; Dolores Winningstad: 304; Brunish Theatre: 200
- Type: Performing arts center

Construction
- Opened: 1987
- Architects: Broome, Oringdulph, O'Toole, Rudolf, Boles & Associates and Barton Myers

Website
- www.portland5.com

Antoinette Hatfield Hall, formerly known as the New Theatre Building, is a 127,000-square-foot (11,800 m^{2}) complex located in Portland, Oregon, in the United States. It is one of three buildings in the Portland'5 Centers for the Arts (formerly known as PCPA), which also includes Arlene Schnitzer Concert Hall and Keller Auditorium. Hatfield Hall contains the Dolores Winningstad Theatre, Newmark Theatre, and Brunish Theatre (formerly Brunish Hall). It was dedicated in honor of Antoinette Hatfield, the former First Lady of Oregon from 1959 to 1967 and the wife of former U.S. Senator and Oregon governor Mark Hatfield.

== Construction ==
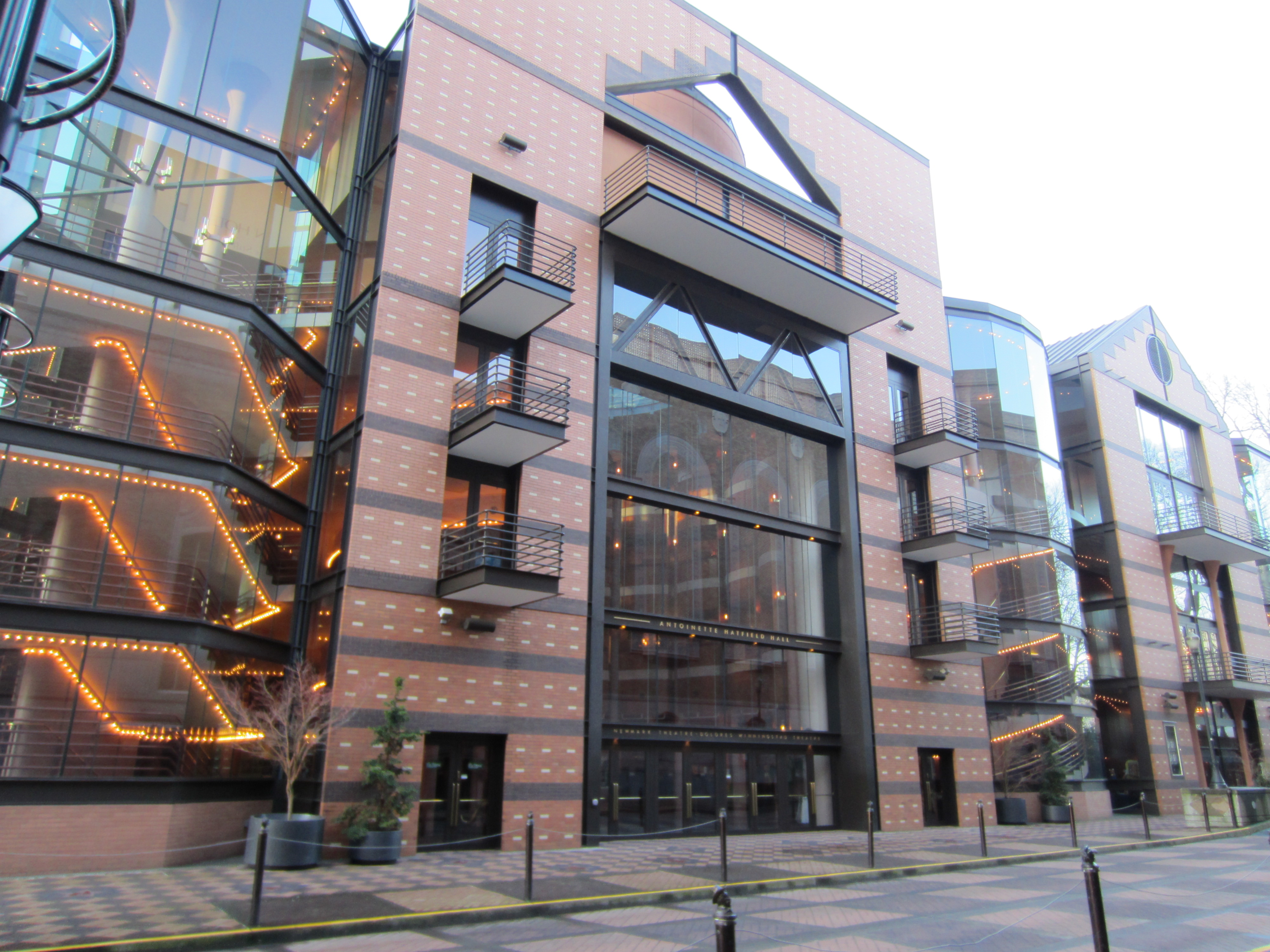
The hall's main entrance

Hatfield Hall was built at a cost of $28.4 million and opened in 1987 as the New Theatre Building. It was designed by Broome, Oringdulph, O'Toole, Rudolf, Boles & Associates, Barton Myers, and ELS of Berkeley, California.

== Theatre venues ==
Antoinette Hatfield Hall is part of the Portland'5 Centers for the Arts (formerly known as PCPA), which also includes Arlene Schnitzer Concert Hall and Keller Auditorium. Three theatre venues are contained in Hatfield Hall: Dolores Winningstad Theatre, the Newmark Theatre, and Brunish Theatre. Known for 19 years as the New Theatre Building, Hatfield Hall was dedicated December 13, 2007, in honor of Antoinette Hatfield, wife of former U.S. Senator and Oregon governor Mark Hatfield.

=== Dolores Winningstad Theatre ===
Located inside Antoinette Hatfield Hall, Dolores Winningstad Theatre is named in honor of the wife of Norman Winningstad, who made a generous donation in 1984. This venue has 304 seats and is a courtyard-style theatre with flexible seating arrangements.

=== Newmark Theatre ===
An Edwardian-style theatre with 880 seats, the Newmark was named in honor of Herb and Jeanne Mittleman Newmark in 1997. No seat is more than 65 feet (20 m) from the stage.

=== Brunish Theatre ===
With a capacity of 200 seats, Brunish Theatre (formerly Brunish Hall) was named in honor of Corey Brunish's mother. This true black box theatre venue may be configured for "meetings, dinners, conferences, weddings, and performances".

== See also ==
- Culture of Portland, Oregon
- Folly Bollards (1998), a series of bollards along Main Street, in front of the hall
- Mago Hermano (Brother Wizard or Magician), Alejandro Colunga's 2003 sculpture, located in the hall's lobby
