= Hospicio Cabañas =

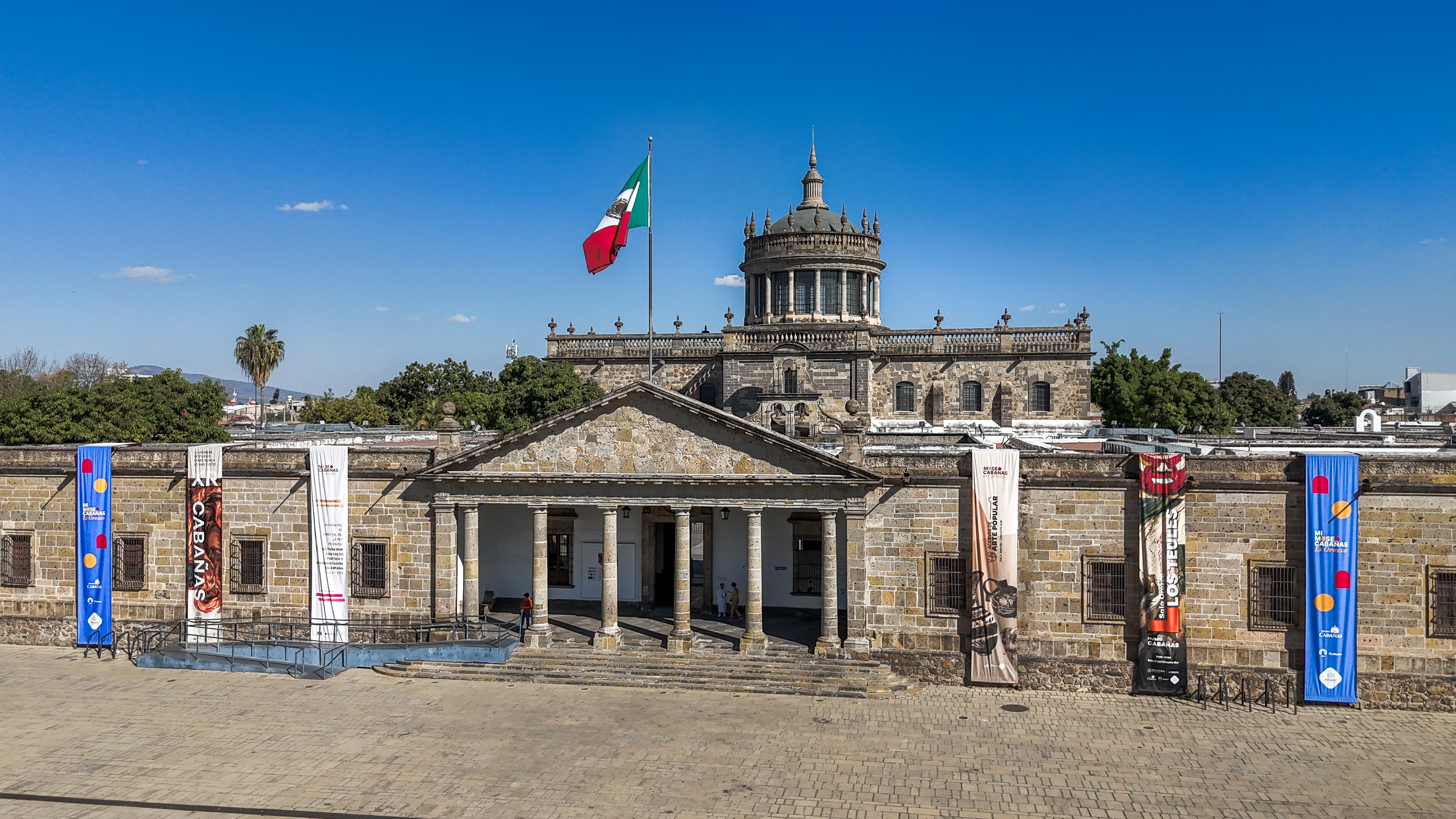
- Front facade of Hospicio Cabañas

General information
- Location: Guadalajara, Jalisco, Mexico
- Year built: 1796-1810

Height
- Height: Chapel dome: 32.5 metres (107 ft)

Technical details
- Floor count: 1

Design and construction
- Architect: Manuel Tolsá

UNESCO World Heritage Site
- Official name: Hospicio Cabañas, Guadalajara
- Type: Cultural
- Criteria: i, ii, iii, iv
- Designated: 1997 (21st session)
- Reference no.: 815
- Region: Latin America and the Caribbean

The Hospicio Cabañas (Spanish pronunciation: [osˈpisjo kaˈβaɲas]) or Cabañas Museum in Guadalajara, Jalisco was one of the oldest and largest orphanage and hospital complexes in the Americas. Now turned into a museum, the main hall hosts the magnum opus frescoes of muralist painter José Clemente Orozco. The place was designated a UNESCO World Heritage Site in 1997.

== History ==
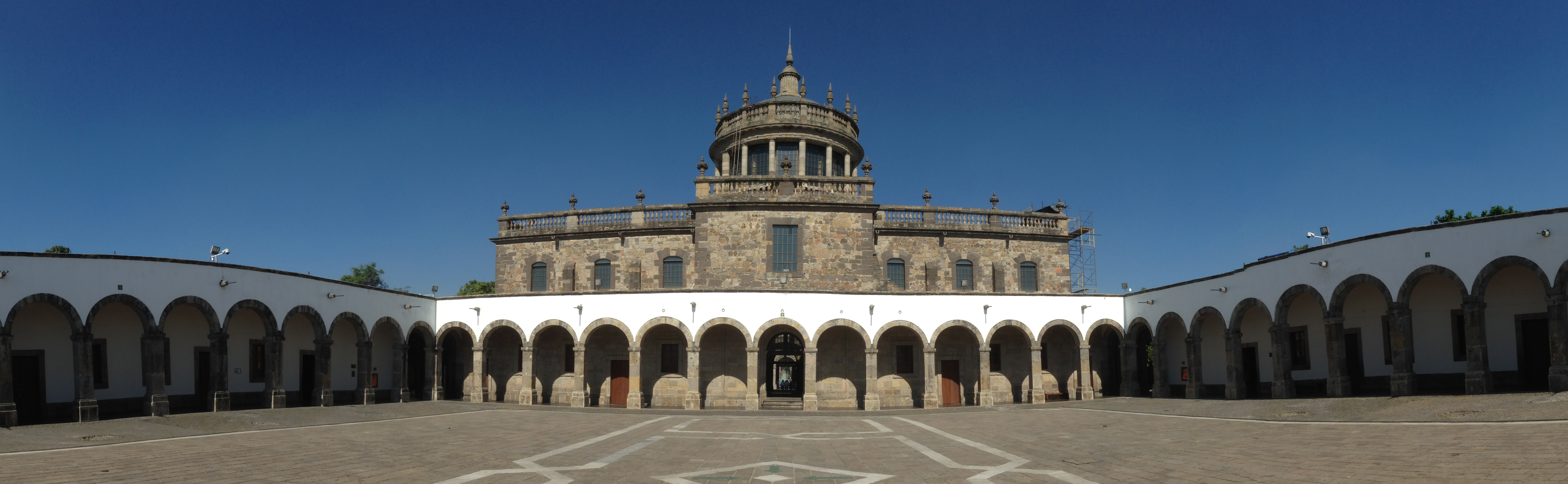
Main interior courtyard.

The complex was founded in 1810 by the Bishop of Guadalajara in order to combine the functions of a workhouse, hospital, orphanage, and almshouse. It owes its name to Juan Ruiz de Cabañas who was appointed to the see of Guadalajara in 1796 and engaged Manuel Tolsá, a renowned architect from Mexico City, to design the structure.

Tolsá's design was based on classic examples such as Les Invalides in Paris and El Escorial near Madrid. The buildings form a rectangle measuring 164 by 145 metres (538 by 476 ft). These are single-storey structures which are 7.5 metres (25 ft) in height. The chapel is twice as high and has a dome rising to 32.5 metres (107 ft). The complex is erected on one level, "so as to facilitate the movement of the sick, the aged, and children."

Frescoes by José Clemente Orozco. Added in the 20th century.

Following the death of Cabañas in 1823, construction continued until 1829. Although it served for a time as barracks in the mid-19th century, the hospital lasted well into the 20th century and continued to function until 1980, when the Cabañas Cultural Institute, with affiliated schools for arts and crafts, moved in. The highlight of the interior decoration is a series of monumental frescoes by José Clemente Orozco, including one of his most famed creations, the allegory of The Man of Fire (1936–39).

Hospicio Cabañas was made a UNESCO World Heritage Site in 1997. Funded through a collaboration by the Cabañas Institute, Jalisco's cultural ministry and the Hilario Galguera Gallery in 2014, French conceptual artist Daniel Buren created a series of site-specific works in 18 of the 23 courtyards, with cloister columns wrapped in geometric patterns, vaults painted in bright hues and mirrored structures built to create distorted views of familiar surroundings.

The sculptures La sala de los magos and Los magos universales by Alejandro Colunga are installed outside the building.
