= La sala de los magos =

Sculpture in Guadalajara, Jalisco, Mexico

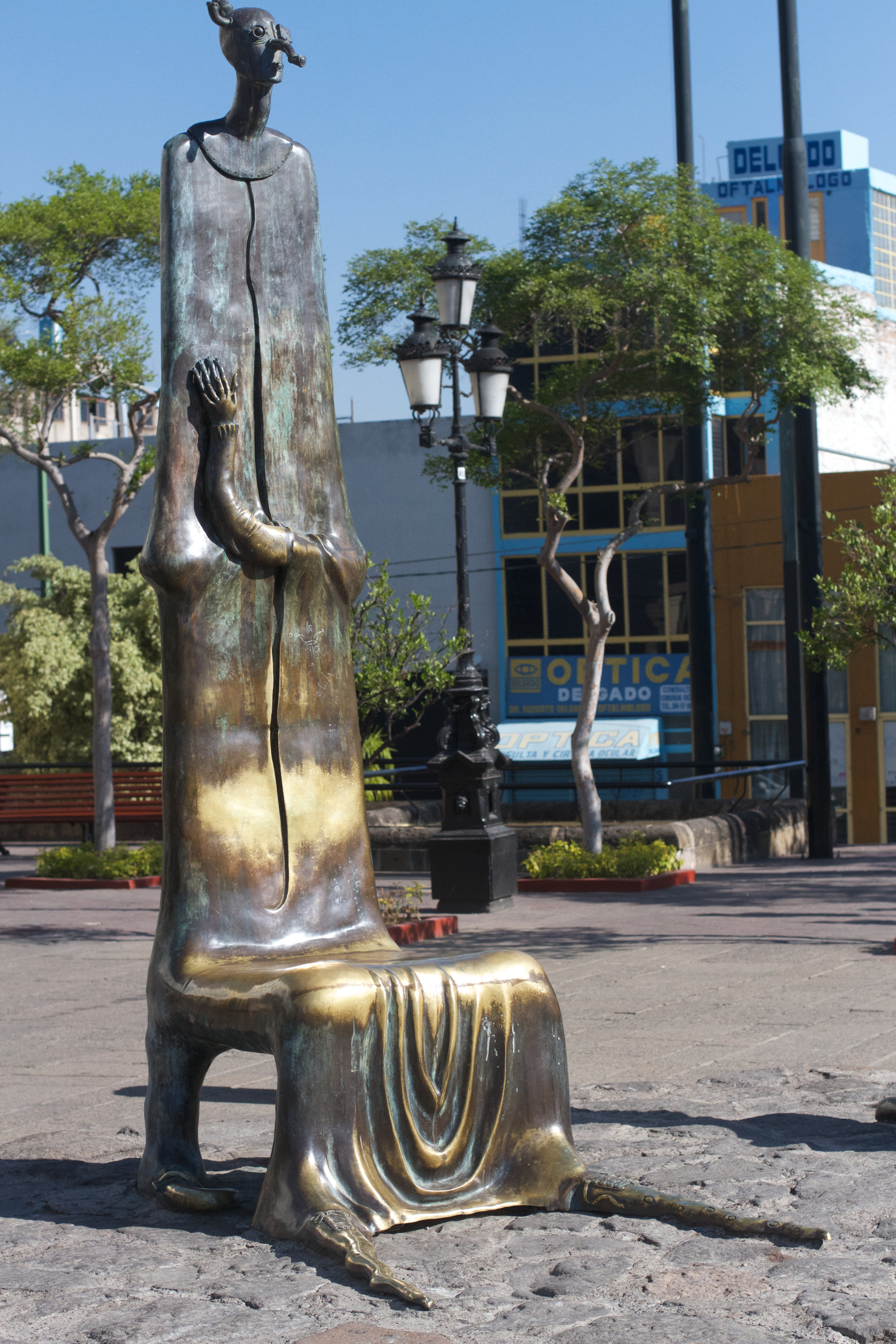
- Part of the installation in 2015
- Artist: Alejandro Colunga
- Year: 1993
- Movement: Surrealism
- Location: Guadalajara, Jalisco, Mexico
- Coordinates: 20°40′35.9″N 103°20′18.7″W

La sala de los magos is a sculpture by Alejandro Colunga, installed in 1993 outside Hospicio Cabañas in Guadalajara, in the Mexican state of Jalisco. Seven years later, Los magos universales, also by Colunga, complemented the artwork.
