= Folly Bollards =

Sculpture series in Portland, Oregon

- Folly Bollards: Harlequin in 2012
- Artist: Valerie Otani
- Year: 1998
- Type: Sculpture
- Medium: Bronze
- Location: Portland, Oregon, United States; 45.51679°N 122.68161°W

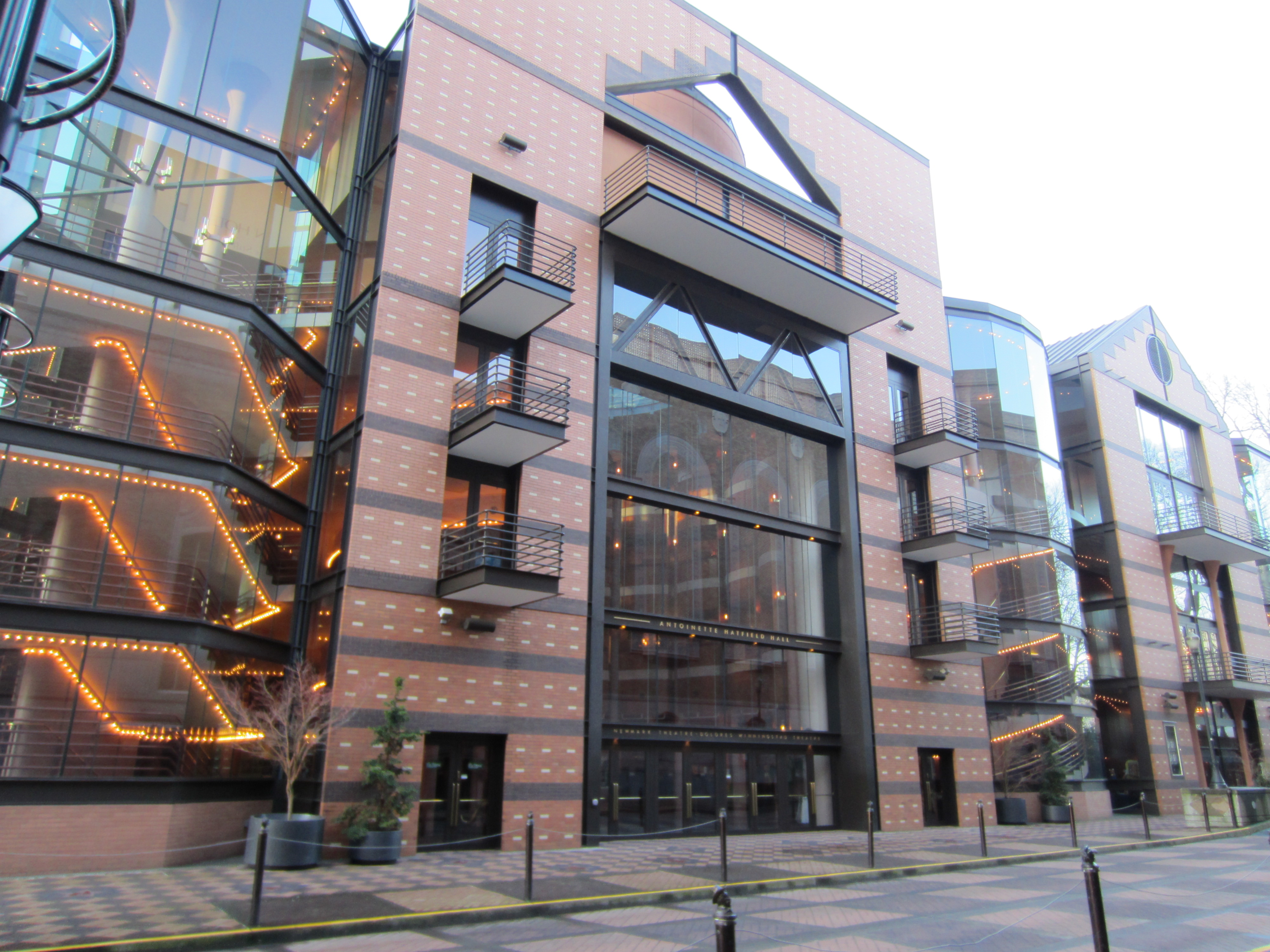
The series of bollards along Southwest Main Street, in front of Antoinette Hatfield Hall, in 2012

Folly Bollards is a series of outdoor 1998 bronze bollard sculptures by Valerie Otani, installed along Southwest Main between Broadway and Park in Portland, Oregon, United States.

== Description and history ==
Sculptures in the series, each of which are abstract bronzes that measure 48 inches (120 cm) x 5 inches (13 cm) x 5 inches (13 cm), include:

- Folly Bollards: Anansi, African Trickster Spider, a spider
- Folly Bollards: El Viejito, Mexico, a Mexican figure
- Folly Bollards: Harlequin, a clown
- Folly Bollards: Monkey King, China, a monkey
- Folly Bollards: Nasreddin, a Turkish figure
- Folly Bollards: Nulamal, Kwakiuti Fool Dancer, a First Nations dancer

== See also ==
- 1998 in art
- Cultural depictions of spiders
