= Los magos universales =

Sculpture in Guadalajara, Jalisco, Mexico

- Artist: Alejandro Colunga
- Year: c. 2000
- Location: Guadalajara, Jalisco, Mexico
- Coordinates: 20°40′38″N 103°20′19″W

Los magos universales are several bronze benches by Alejandro Colunga, installed outside Hospicio Cabañas in Guadalajara, in the Mexican state of Jalisco. The sculpture was installed around 2000 to complement La sala de los magos, also by Colunga.
