= The Rotunda by the Sea =

1996 art installation in Puerto Vallarta, Mexico

- La rotonda del mar (Spanish)
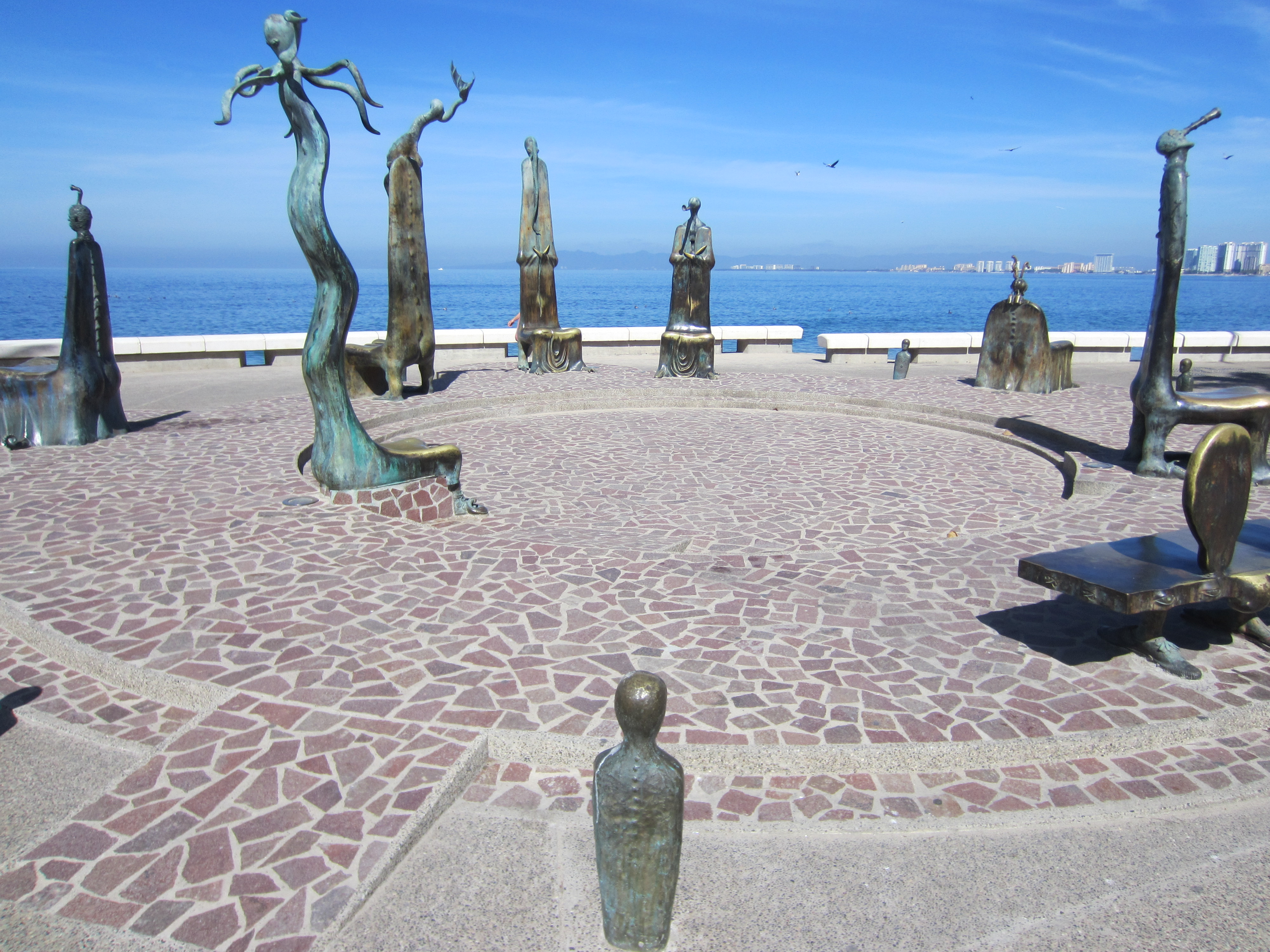
- Artist: Alejandro Colunga
- Location: Puerto Vallarta, Jalisco, Mexico; 20°36′41.2″N 105°14′4.6″W

The Rotunda by the Sea (Spanish: "La rotonda del mar") is an art installation by sculptor Alejandro Colunga along Puerto Vallarta's Malecón, in the Mexican state of Jalisco. Unveiled in 1996, the work has eight bronze thrones arranged in a circle.

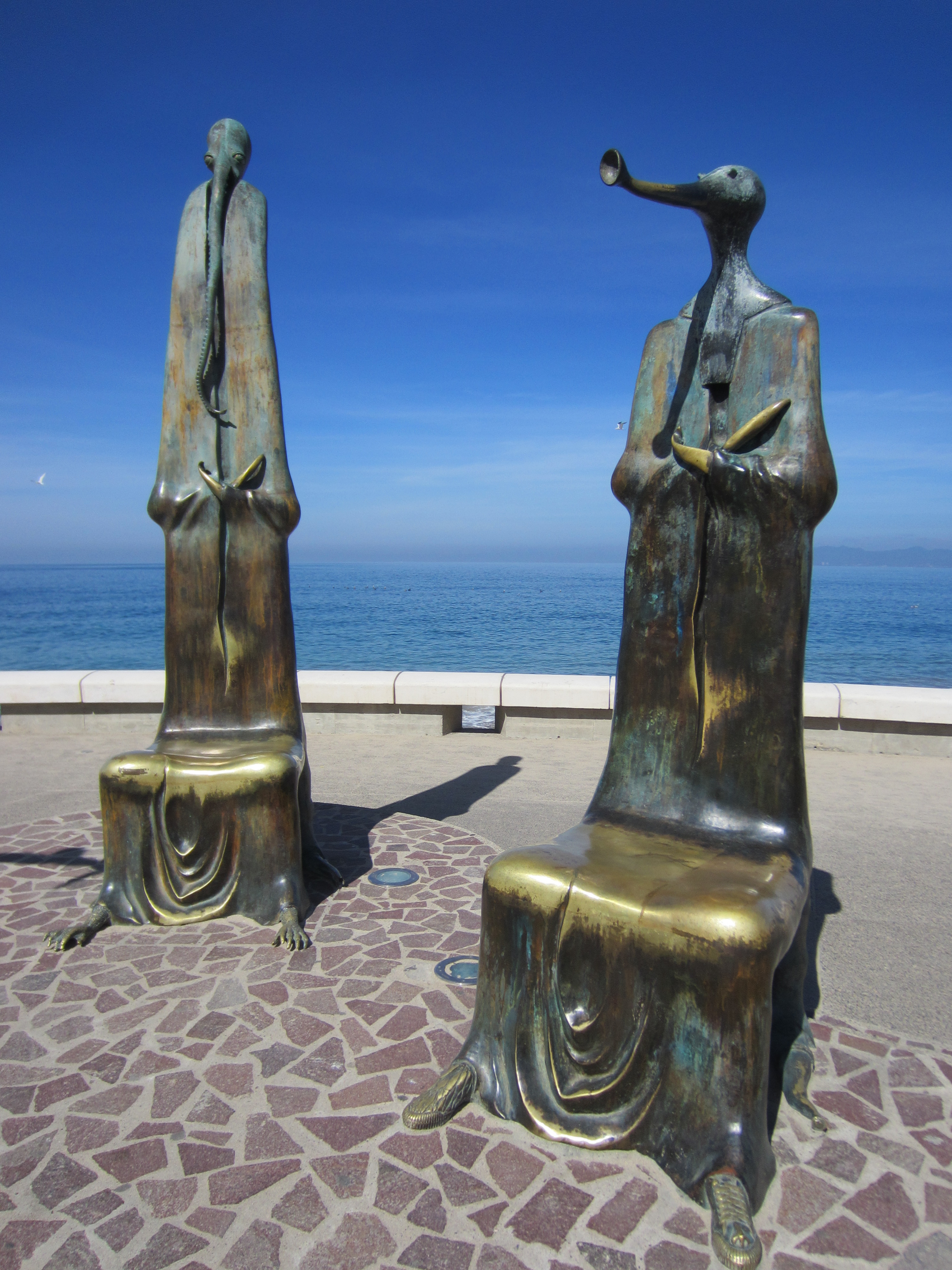

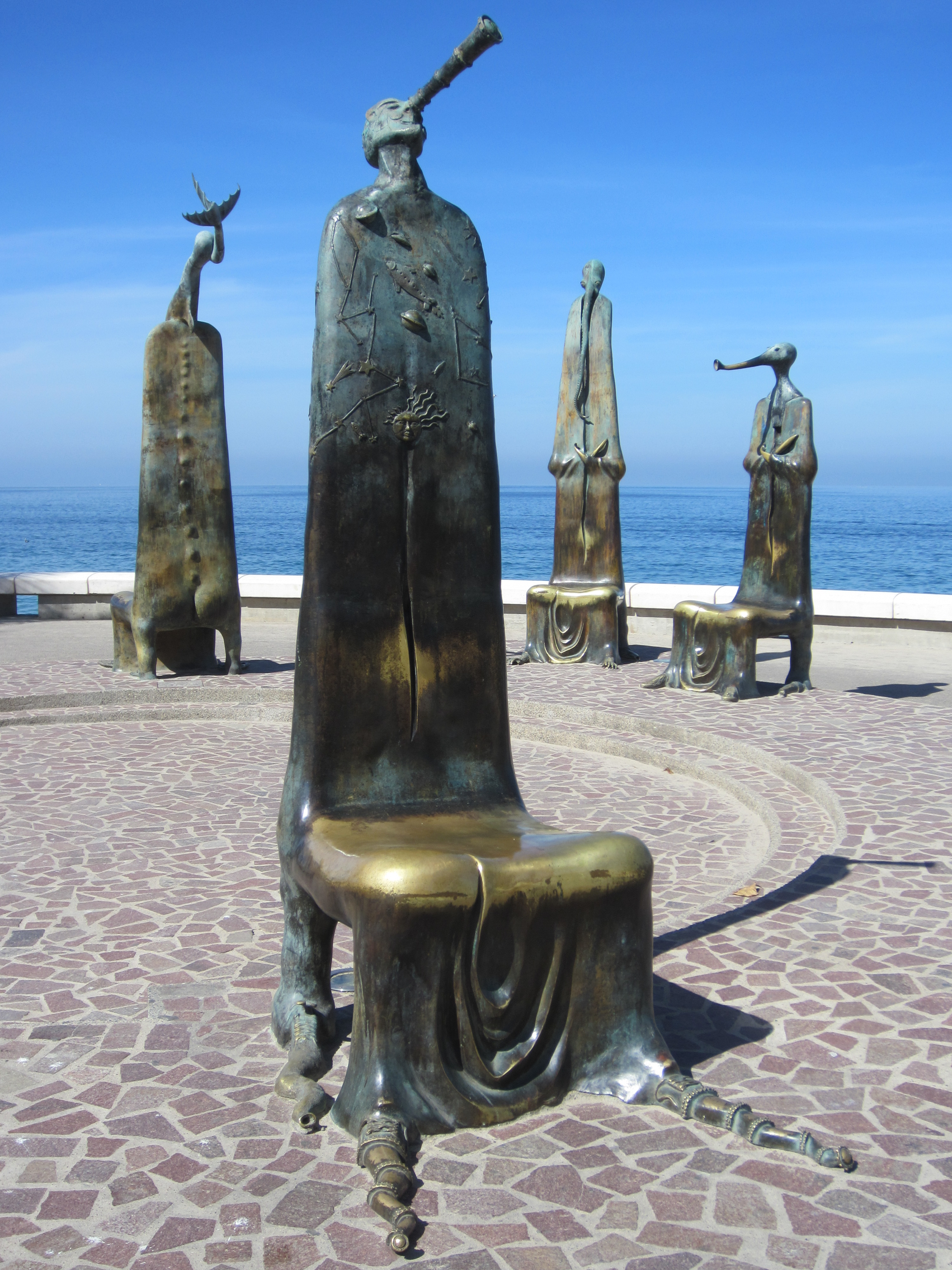

== See also ==
- 1996 in art
