= Dorothea Lensch =

American director of recreation (1907–2000)

- Born: October 5, 1907; Portland, Oregon
- Died: July 27, 2000 (aged 92); Portland, Oregon
- Occupation: Portland Parks & Recreation Director of Recreation
- Years active: 1937-1974
- Known for: expanding recreation to include the arts as well as sports
- Notable work: Portland Children's Museum founder

Dorothea Marie Lensch (1907–2000) was the first director of recreation at the Portland Parks & Recreation bureau from 1937 until 1974. She founded the Portland Children's Museum and was a founding member of the Portland Opera Association and the Japanese Garden. During her time with the Portland Parks Bureau, sixteen recreation centers were added to the city.

== Early life and career ==
Lensch was born in Portland on October 5, 1907. In 1929, she was awarded a bachelor's degree in physical education at the University of Oregon and, in 1930, a master's degree in health from Wellesley College in Massachusetts. In 1966, she completed a PhD in health, physical education and recreation from the University of Oregon.

Lensch's believed that individuals should have a wide variety of recreational activities to choose from and the parks programming should be aware of and responsive to people's needs.

In 1943, thousands of soldiers trained for WWII deployment in Portland's shipyards. These soldiers, as well as shipyard workers, swelled the city's population. A parks report under Lensch's directorship notes that the newcomers would adjust to Portland life more easily if they experienced "personal satisfaction" and called for providing recreation "to every age level, 24 hours a day, 7 days a week, within walking distance." Swimming, horseshoe pitching, table tennis, archery, knitting, woodcarving, painting, sketching, folk dancing, pageants, community sings, garden groups and first aid classes are among the recommended activities for the Parks Bureau to provide.

In 1946, she founded the Portland Children's Museum.

She created specific programming to meet the needs of children with disabilities as well as the elderly.

In 1963, members of the community accused Lensch of discriminatory hiring practices and of not listening to feedback from black community members.

Lensch died in Portland on July 27, 2000.
