= Portland Children's Museum =

Children's museum in Portland, Oregon, U.S.

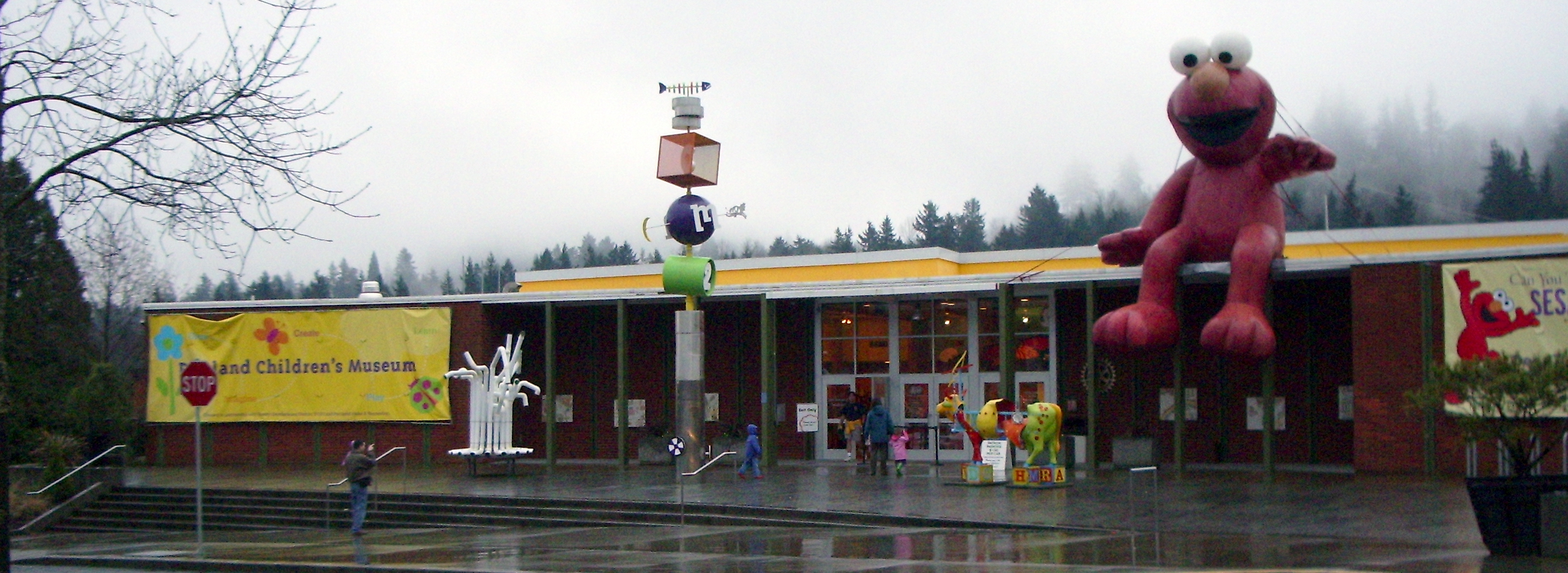
- Established: 1946
- Dissolved: 2021
- Location: Portland, Oregon, U.S.
- Coordinates: 45.5085°N 122.7179°W
- Type: Children's museum
- Founder: Dorothea Lensch

Portland Children's Museum was a children's museum located in Portland's Washington Park, adjacent to the Oregon Zoo. Founded in 1946, Portland Children's Museum was the sixth oldest children's museum in the world and the oldest west of the Mississippi. The 50,000 sq ft (4,600 m^{2}) museum received over a quarter of a million visits from children and their families every year. It was a non-profit organization with tax-exempt status and member of the Association of Children's Museums. In March 2021, the museum announced it would permanently close at the end of June, due to the financial loss brought on by the COVID-19 pandemic.

== History ==
Portland Children's Museum was founded in 1946 as the Adventure House by the first recreation director of Portland Parks & Recreation, Dorothea Marie Lensch.

The original museum building was located at the Jacob Kamm mansion in Southwest Portland until 1949 when it moved to a building (formerly a dormitory) on Lair Hill just south of downtown Portland. The Lair Hill Museum contained a pet library (from which children could check-out animals) as well as a variety of interactive and informative exhibits. The Lair Hill museum hosted regular arts and crafts workshops as well as sports games and other activities.

After 52 years of occupancy at the downtown location, the building was closed on March 31, 2001, and Portland Children's Museum moved to its final location in Washington Park, in the building which previously housed Oregon Museum of Science and Industry.

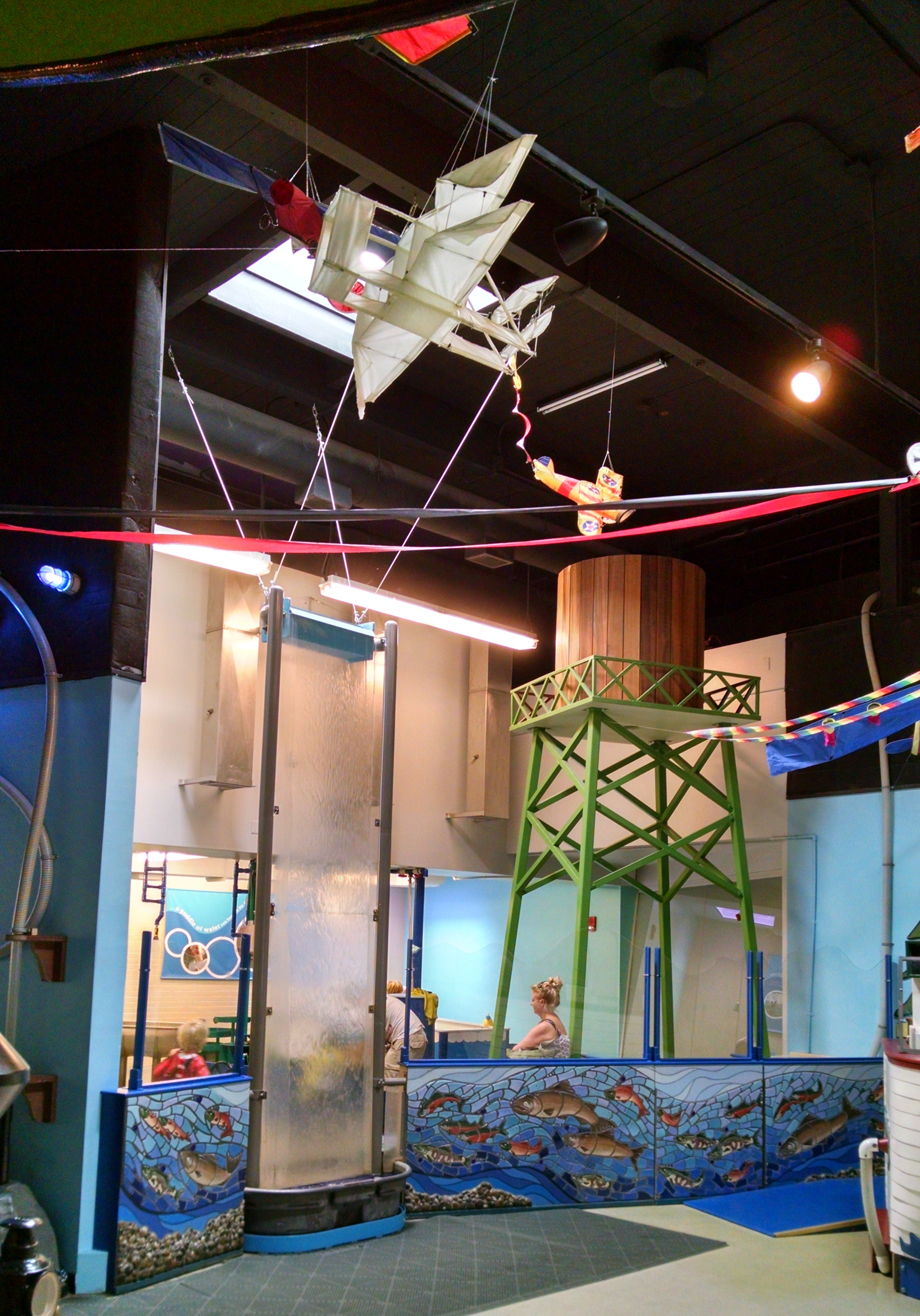
The museum's interior in 2014

The mission of Portland Children's Museum was to create transformative learning experiences through the arts and sciences. The museum used cognitive science and child development research to inform environments and programs that promoted healthy cognitive, social, emotional and physical development. Myriad exhibits, including Water Works, Play-it-Again Theater, Building Bridgetown, Groundworks, Outdoor Adventure, and the Baby's Garden, along with the museum's art studios, The Clay Studio, The Wonder Corner and The Garage encouraged playful inquiry, cultivated creative expression and helped children learn how to learn.

Portland Children's Museum provided access to the museum and museum programs for children and families with economic, social or physical challenges through the Community Partners Program. Qualifying children, families, schools and other groups had access to low-cost Museum memberships and family passes, free or subsidized arts workshops, and other resources. The museum also hosted a number of admission-free days and evenings. As of 2009, the Community Partners Program provided access to the museum and museum programs for over 20,000 children and their families.

Opal School of the Portland Children's Museum was an elementary school that was chartered by the Portland Public School District. Opal's teaching and learning approaches were influenced and inspired by the philosophies and practices of the Reggio Emilia approach.

Portland Children's Museum was supported through member contributions, sponsorships, foundation grants, federal grants, and the support of generous individuals. While the museum had a full-time staff, it depended on volunteers at every level of the organization.

== See also ==
- Culture of Portland, Oregon
