= Keller Auditorium =

Performing arts center in Portland, Oregon, U.S.

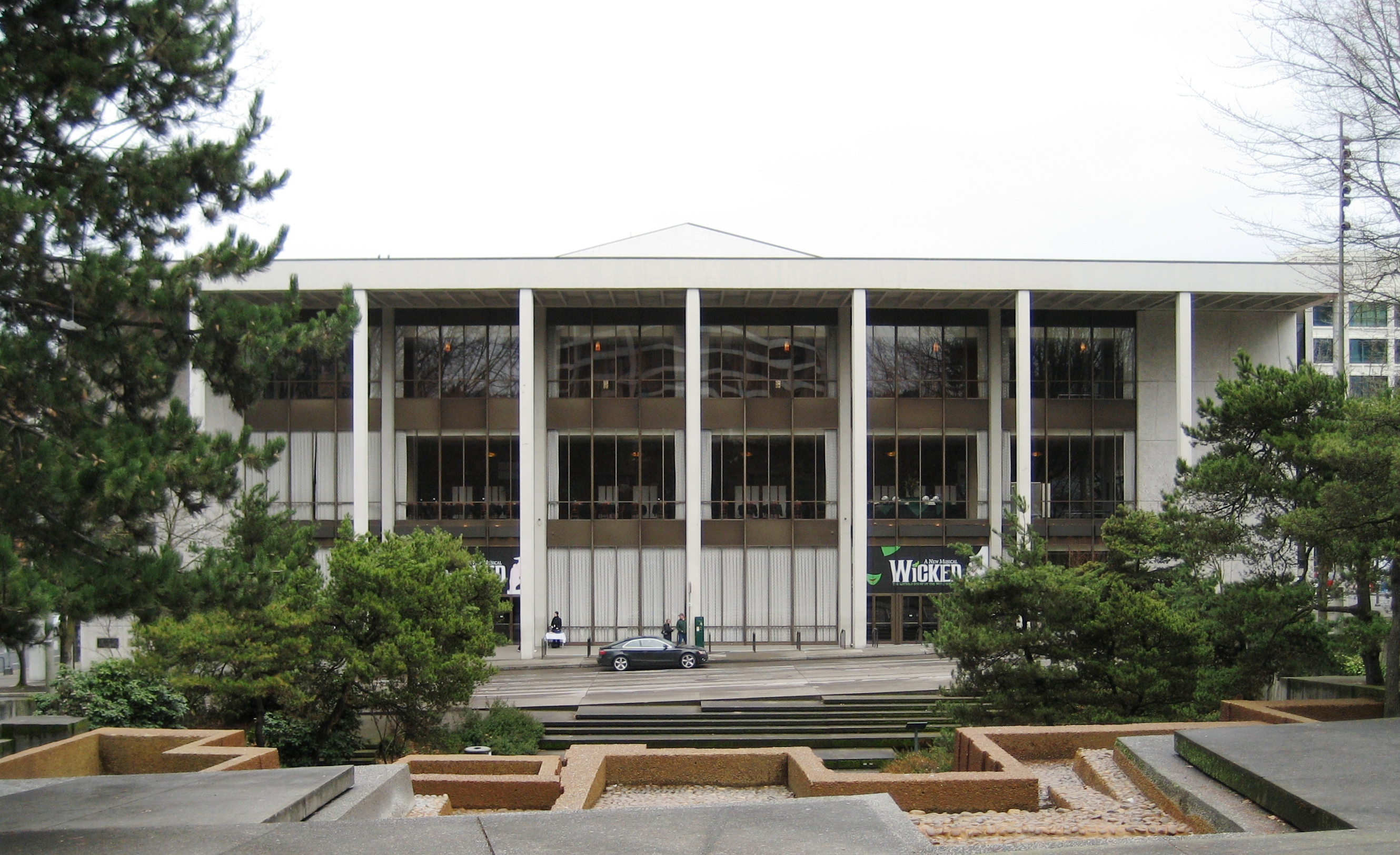
- Front of Keller Auditorium, on Third Avenue

- Location within Portland, Oregon
- Former names: Portland Municipal Auditorium, Portland Public Auditorium, Portland Civic Auditorium
- Address: 222 SW Clay Street; Portland, Oregon, 97205; United States
- Coordinates: 45.512583°N 122.678565°W
- Owner: City of Portland
- Operator: Portland's Centers for the Arts
- Capacity: 2,992; 3,034 (with pit seats)
- Type: Performing arts center

Construction
- Opened: 1917

Website
- portland5.com

Keller Auditorium, formerly known as the Portland Municipal Auditorium, the Portland Public Auditorium, and the Portland Civic Auditorium, is a performing arts center located on Clay Street in Downtown Portland, Oregon, United States. It is part of the Portland's Centers for the Arts. Opened in 1917, the venue first changed names in 1966, being renamed again in 2000 in honor of a $1.5 million renovation donation by Richard B. Keller. An extensive remodeling and modernization in 1967–68 effectively changed its original exterior appearance beyond recognition.

Originally holding 4,500 people, the venue now has a capacity of 3,034.

The Keller Auditorium is the home of many performances of the Portland Opera and the Oregon Ballet Theatre. It also holds performances of touring Broadway productions through a partnership with Broadway Across America. It was the longtime home of the Portland Symphony Orchestra (now the Oregon Symphony), from 1917 to 1984. It also housed the Oregon Historical Society and its museum from 1917 to 1965.

== Original building ==
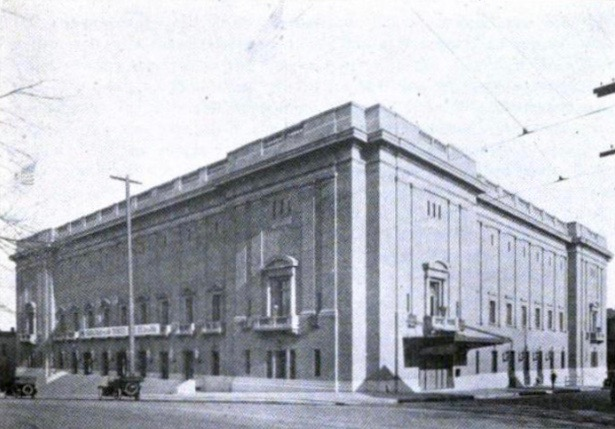
The building's original appearance, before its extensive 1967–68 remodeling. The Third Street (now Third Avenue) façade is on the left.

The auditorium building occupies an entire city block in downtown Portland, bounded by Third and Second Avenues and Clay and Market Streets. The site had previously been occupied by the Portland Mechanics' Pavilion, built in 1879.

The new hall was constructed in 1916–17 from designs by New York architects Joseph H. Freelander and A.D. Seymour, with local associate architects Whitehouse & Fouilhoux. Originally known as the Public Auditorium, or alternatively Municipal Auditorium, the facility's formal opening and dedication took place on July 4, 1917, and the first full concert took place the following day, with what was dubbed the first annual Portland "Music Festival", featuring the Portland Symphony Orchestra (now the Oregon Symphony).

Another longtime tenant of the auditorium building was the Oregon Historical Society, whose headquarters and museum were located in the building for almost five decades. The society moved from the Tourny Building in 1917, occupying space on the second and third floors.

== Renovation ==
In the early 1960s, the historical society approved plans to build a new facility for its exhibits, archives, research facilities and offices. In November 1964, the city's voters approved a ballot measure that sought funding for a $3.9 million rebuilding of the auditorium. The building had been renamed Civic Auditorium by this time.

The museum in the auditorium closed permanently in June 1965, with the exhibits thereafter being moved to temporary storage until completion of the new museum, which opened in fall 1966.

In 1967–68, the building underwent an extensive remodeling, which included complete refacing with a new modern-style exterior, at a cost of $4 million. Architect for the renovation was Keith Maguire of Portland architectural firm Stanton, Boles, Maguire & Church. It was ceremonially reopened on May 3, 1968. Only 17 percent of the original structure was salvaged as part of the remodeling, comprising mainly the north and south walls.

In June 1970, Ada Louise Huxtable called the redesigned auditorium "a building of unrelieved blandness".

A 2020 seismic study has indicated that the facility is not built to withstand a major earthquake; in 2022 the city of Portland dedicated $200,000 to study options for upgrading or replacing the facility.

== Notable events ==
President Dwight D. Eisenhower delivered a campaign speech on October 18, 1956 at the auditorium. Then-Senator John F. Kennedy spoke at the auditorium on September 7, 1960. Led Zeppelin performed as an opening act on December 29, 1968 during their first North American concert tour.

== See also ==
- Culture of Portland, Oregon
- Keller Fountain Park
