= Alejandro Colunga =

Mexican artist

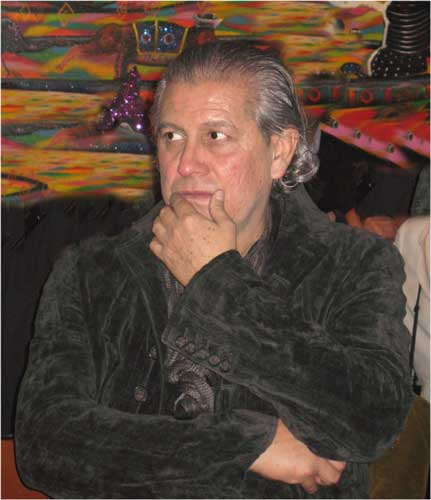
- Born: 11 December 1948 (age 77); Guadalajara, Jalisco
- Known for: Artist: painting, sculpture

Alejandro Colunga Marín is a Mexican artist, painter and sculptor.

== Early life ==
He was born in Guadalajara on 11 December 1948 and studied architecture between 1967 and 1971 and music and hospitality in 1971–1973 at Conservatorio del Estado de Jalisco. Colunga's painting and sculpting abilities were self-taught. He has also extensively studied anthropology and languages.

== Career as painter and sculptor ==
His work is characterized by the intensity of his vision and his passionate expressionism and has gained international recognition.

His works follow the Latin American tradition of surrealism and fantasy. He has participated in many exhibitions, individually and collectively since 1968, in the United States, Mexico, Europe and South America. Some of his works of art form part of important private collections as well as museum collections. He works on ambitious sculptural projects in various countries. For example, one well-known series of eight sculptures of his, The Rotunda by the Sea, is a collection of bronze chairs that were created for Puerto Vallarta's boardwalk (malecon).

Colunga has cited Rufino Tamayo as an artist who has influenced his work.

He studied architecture for three years before dedicating himself to painting in 1971.

== Art: paintings and sculptures ==
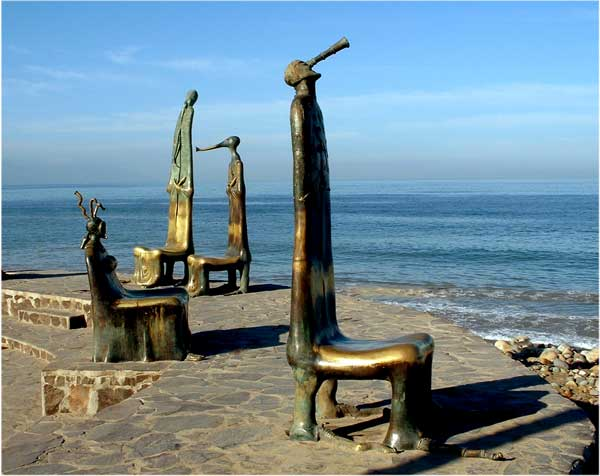
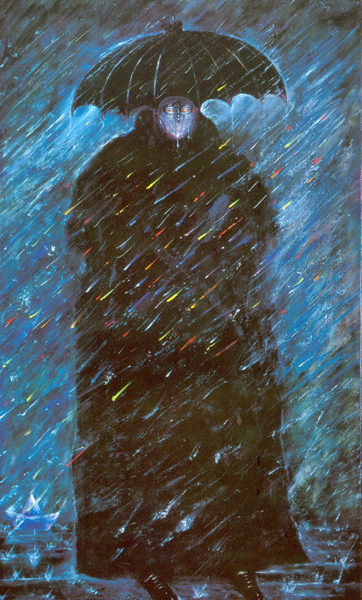
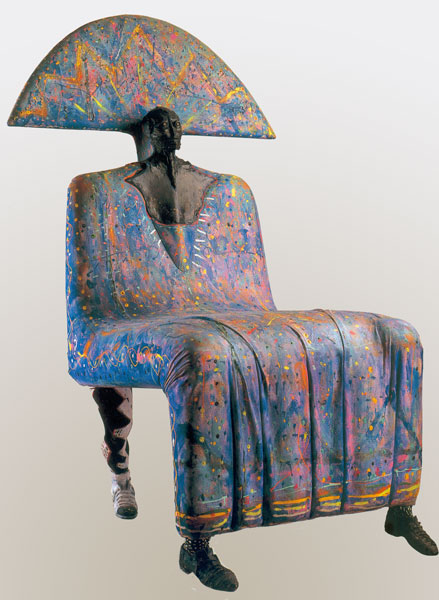
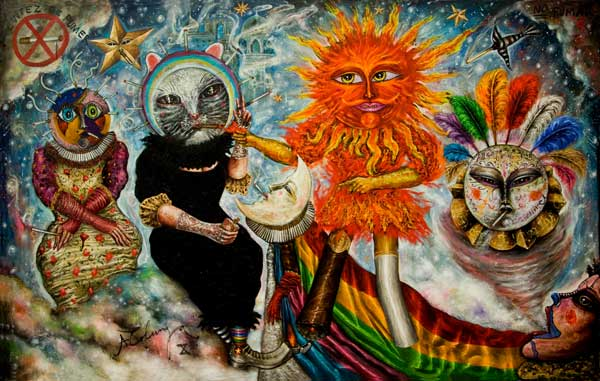
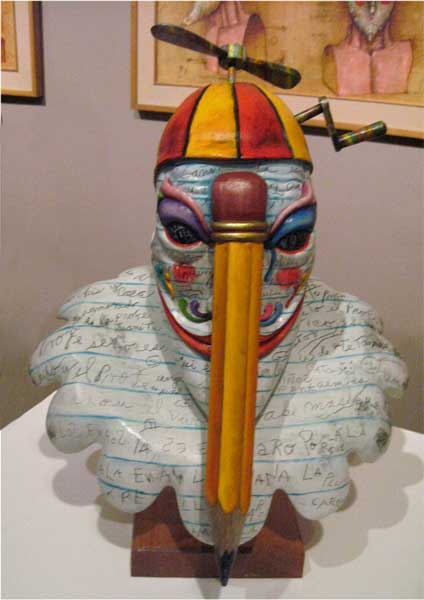
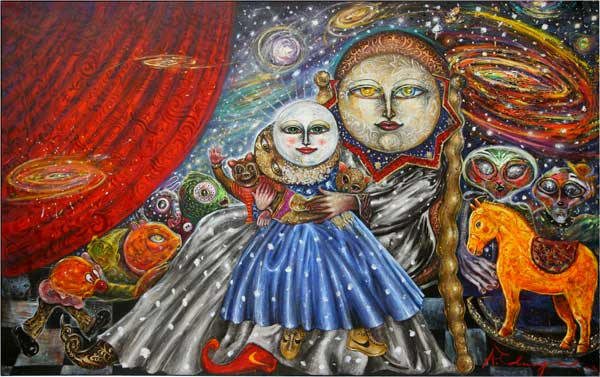

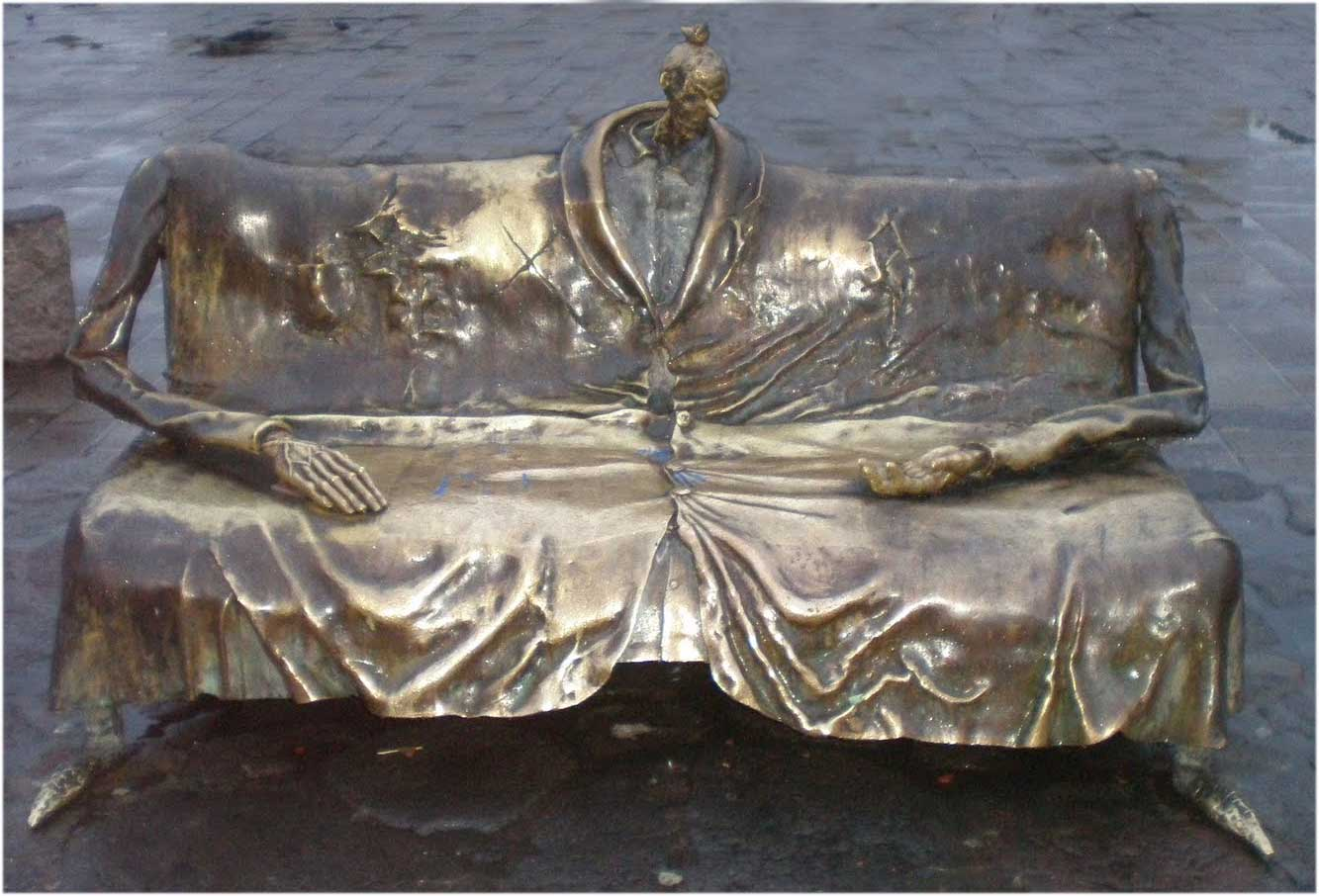
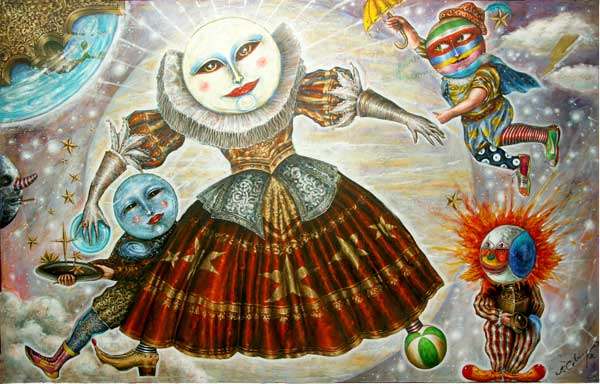
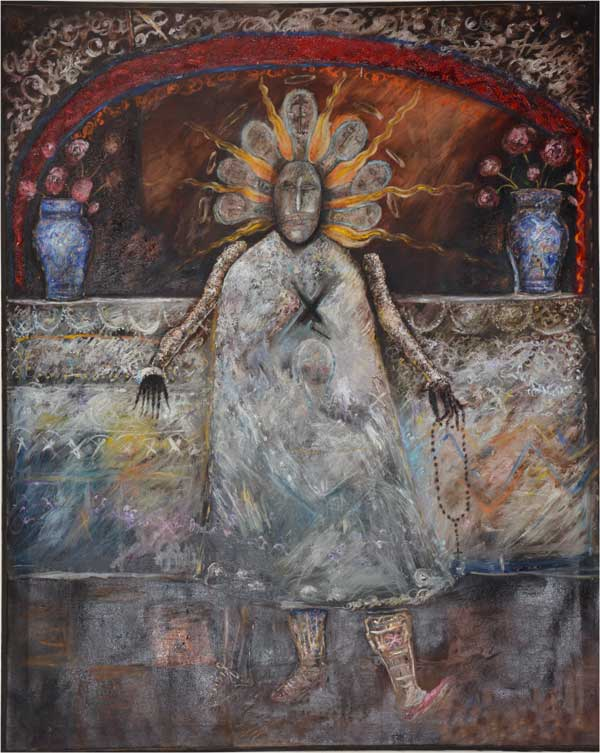
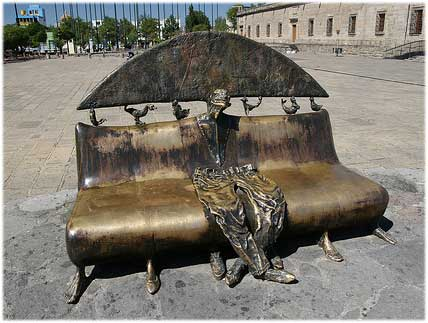
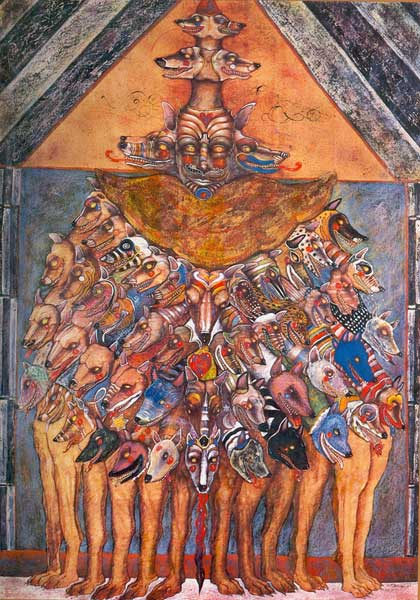

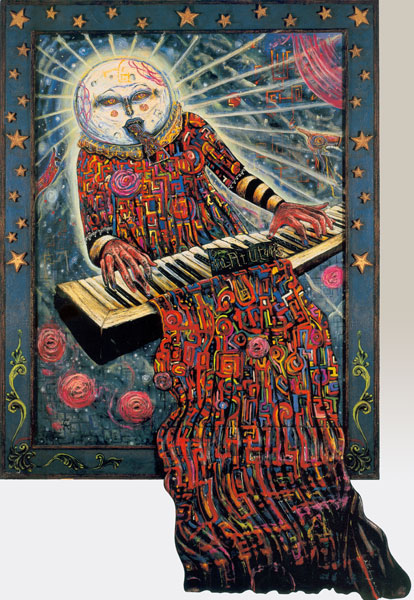
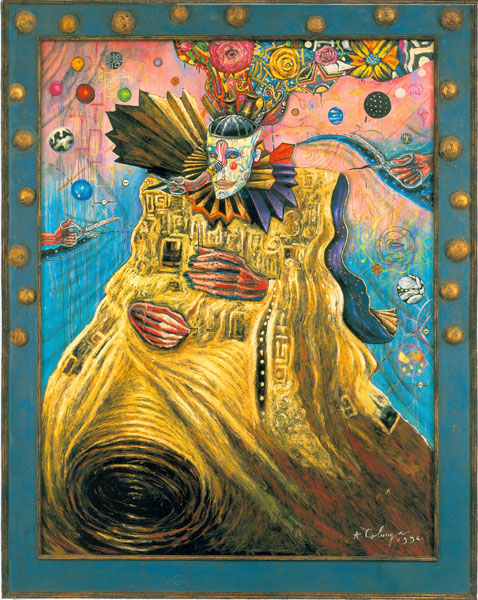

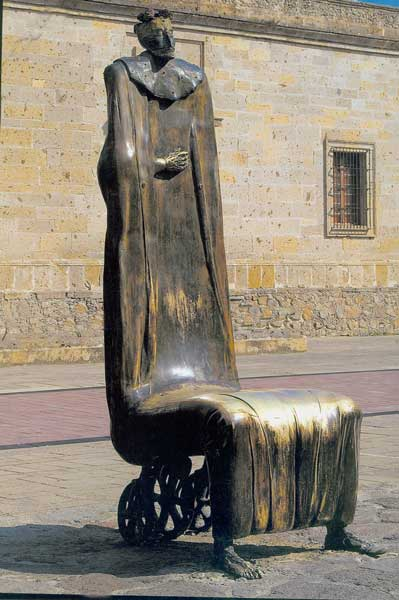

== Individual exhibitions, trajectory, and awards ==
- 1968

"La Galería", Guadalajara, Jalisco.

- 1969

Senior International, Guadalajara, Jalisco.

- 1972

Casa de la Cultura, Guadalajara, Jalisco.

- 1974

Galería Doce, Guadalajara, Jalisco. lithograph at Ernesto de Soto. San Francisco, California.

- 1975

Lithographs at Kyron's; studio with Andrew Vlady. Exposition Galería Franco Terranova, IPANEMA, Río de Janeiro, Brasil. Galería O. M., Guadalajara, Jalisco.

- 1976

Museo de Arte Moderno, Morelia Michoacán. Museo de Arte Contemporáneo, Bahía, Brasil. Galeria Uno, Puerto Vallarta, Jalisco.

- 1977

Galeria Miró, Monterrey, N. L.

- 1978

This year He travels to Brasil, Europa, África and India.

- 1979

Galería Miró, Monterrey, N. L.

- 1980

Travels to Europe, with the purpose to research and study. Museo de Arte Moderno, Cd. De México, D. F. Galería Hagerman Baños, México, D. F.

- 1981

Promoción de las Artes, Monterrey, N. L.

- 1982

Museum of Modern Art, O.E.A., Washington, D. C. Proyect sculptures 18 m high for S.I.N., New York, N.Y. Galery at Mexican Embassy at Bern, Switzerland. Galery Mexican Embassy en Zurich, Switzerland. Galery Rudy Müller, Zurich, Suiza.

- 1984

Galeria de Arte Actual Mexicano, Monterrey, N. L.

- 1985

Invited by Arts Meridian to a Simposium about Art for the Américas, by the Stanford University of San Francisco, Cal., U.S.A.

- 1987

Works in experimental Proyects Sculpture in terracotta cerámic glassed with Museum Jorge Wilmont.

- 1988

Award Minerva de las Artes, Guadalajara, Jalisco.

- 1989

Foire Internacional D´Art Contemporain Grand Palais, París, France. (FIAC)

- 1990

Foire Internacional D´Art Contemporain Grand Palais, París, France. (FIAC) Dorsky Gallery, New York, N. Y., U.S.A.

- 1991

Foro Internacional Arte Contemporáneo, Bogotá, Colombia. Conference about influences and trends in Art.

- 1992

Foro International Contemporary Art, Caracas, Venezuela Conference about Racism in Art. International Forum of Contemporary Art, Bogotá, Colombia. Workshop with young Colombian artists. Invited as jury at International Movie Festival Santa Fe de Bogotá, Colombia. International Art Exposition, Miami, Fl., U.S.A. Designs scenery and costumes for the play "Paraíso" for the Monterrey N.L Ballet.

- 1993

Five Interactive Monumental Sculptures "La sala de los magos". Permanent Installation at the front of the Centro Cultural Cabañas en la Plaza Tapatía. Guadalajara, Jalisco. International Art Exposition, Miami, Fl., U.S.A. Jansen Gallery, San Antonio, Texas, U.S.A. Galery ARN, Zurich, Suiza.

- 1994

Award Jalisco de las Artes, Guadalajara, Jal. México.

- 1995

Award Arquitecture for the interactive installation, "La sala de los magos", Guadalajara, Jal. 94/95 Monumental Set of seven sculptures "Los Magos que Esperan". Privat Financial Group . Guadalajara, Jal. México.

- 1997Set of 8 Monumental sculptures called "La Rotonda del Mar"

Permanent installation at the el malecón, Puerto Vallarta, Jal. México. 97/98 Book about work of drawings big size. Guadalajara, Jal. México.

- 1998

Works in a Talavera project with utilitarian cerámic, Momic children jar, extraterrestrial children and furniture at the workshop "Talavera de la Reina" Puebla, Pue. Hall "Alejandro Colunga" permanent exposition devoted to his work of art, Amparo Museum, Puebla, Pue. Collection Group four pieces called "Sala de los Magos II". Patio central, Museo Amparo, Puebla, Pue. México.

- 1999

Regional Museum, "Abrazo Ancestral", Guadalajara, Jal. México. 99/00 Eight Monumental Sculptures Called "Los magos universales", Interaction Proyect. Plaza Tapatía, Guadalajara, Jal. México.

- 2000

Fountain "Los Magos del Sol" Set of five sculptures in bronze at the Plaza del Sol, Guadalajara, Jal. México. Experiment about astronomy with a Traditional Mexican chair (Equipal) with the coordination with the historiographer and researcher Martha Figueroa.

- 2001

Art and Fashion to tribute Alejandro Colunga "La Noche de Los Magos" at the esplanade Centro Cultural Cabañas, Guadalajara, Jal.

- 2002

Created the scenery, costumes, make-up and performance "Las Bodas del Cielo y El Infierno" theatrical play of William Blake at the Theater de las Artes at the Centro Nacional de las Artes at the Ciudad de México and Theater Degollado at Guadalajara, Jal. México. Installs a Monumental interactive sculpture, at the City Center Portland Oregon, U.S.A.

- 2003

Project for the new installation of 8 monumental sculptures for Puerto Vallarta, Jal.

- 2004

Exhibition at Galería Azul at Guadalajara.

- 2005

Participation as actor at the film "Sincronía" Guadalajara, Jal. Installation of eight Monumental Sculptures, for the Nassau Country Museum, Long Island, New York Designs a set of sculptures for the awards to the most renown Football team

- 2006

Book about his work at ediciones Espejo de Obsidiana, in México City. Movie in process about his life and his work director from Rumania, Antoniu Moldovan. Documentary about his trips, life and work by Mexican tapatío director Juan Pablo Angel Guggenbuehl. Permanent Exposition at the Nassau County Museum Collection, Long Island, New York. Project of a set of Sculptures at the Los Magos Garden, based in games for children Works in a set of engraving great size at the Workshop Guacha Bato in collaboration with Sergio Ruiz. Recognition and Award at the Congress of the State of Jalisco, México. Recognition at Radio University of Guadalajara at Puerto Vallarta, México.

- 2007

Working on monumental sculptures for the Nassau County Museum, Long Island New York. Award Galardón Nacional "Ocho Columnas de Oro". Guadalajara, México

- 2008

Exhibition "Maravillas y Pesadillas" Museo de las Artes de La Universidad de Guadalajara and Instituto Cultural Cabañas. Tribute for his 40 years of trajectory, by the H. Ayuntamiento de Puerto Vallarta.

- 2010

Award Pedro Sarquís Merrewe Foundation

Award Guadalajara, given by the City of Guadalajara in a solemn City ceremony.

== Collectors ==
- Arizona State University Art Museum, Tempe, Arizona
- Berardo Collection Museum, Lisbon, Portugal
- San Antonio Museum of Art, San Antonio, Texas
- Nassau County Museum of Art, Long Island, NY
- Museo Amparo, Puebla, Mexico
- Museo Cabañas, Guadalajara, Jalisco
