= Portland's Centers for the Arts =

Performing arts organization and venues in Portland, Oregon

Coordinates: 45.516694°N 122.681403°W

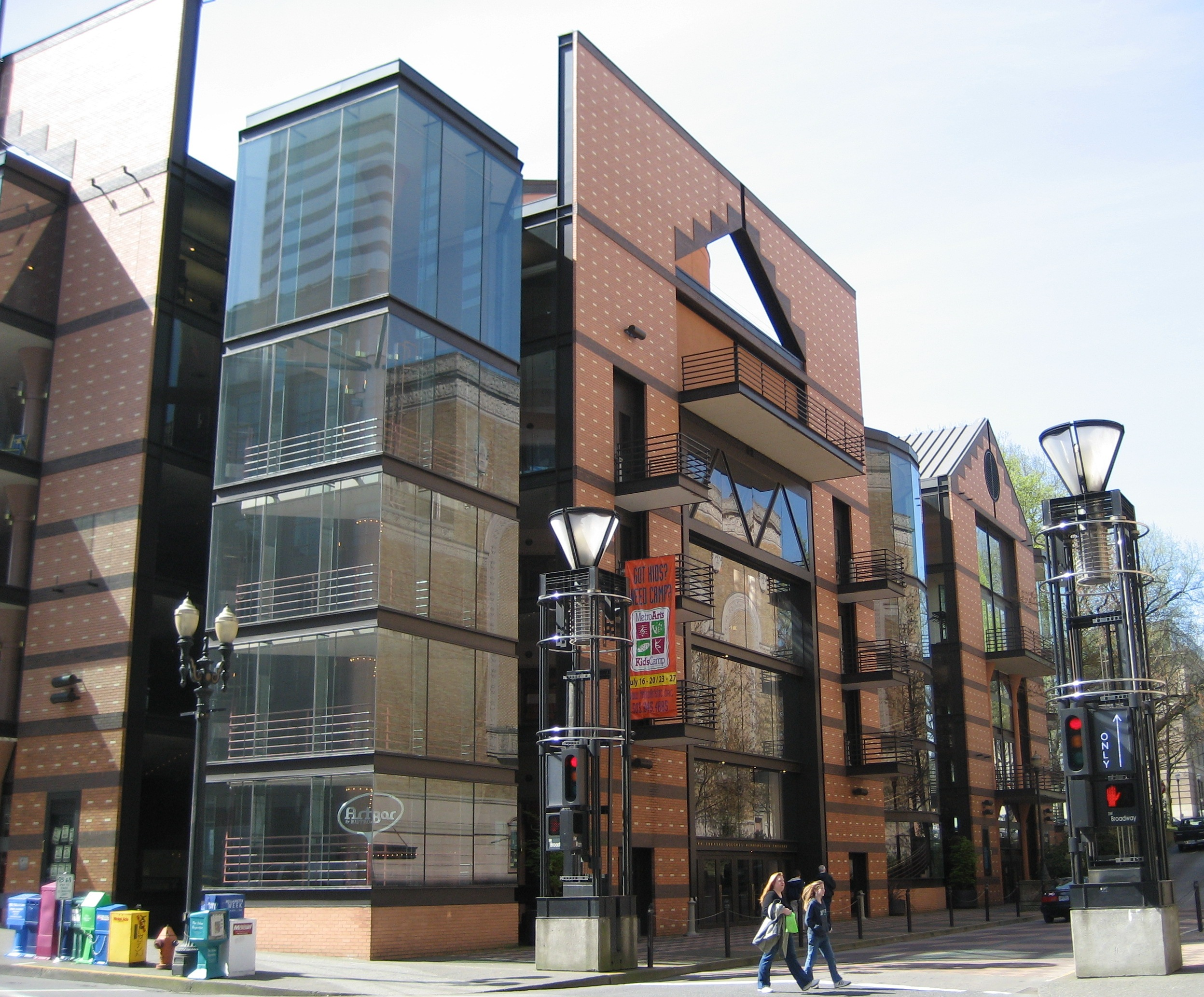
Antoinette Hatfield Hall

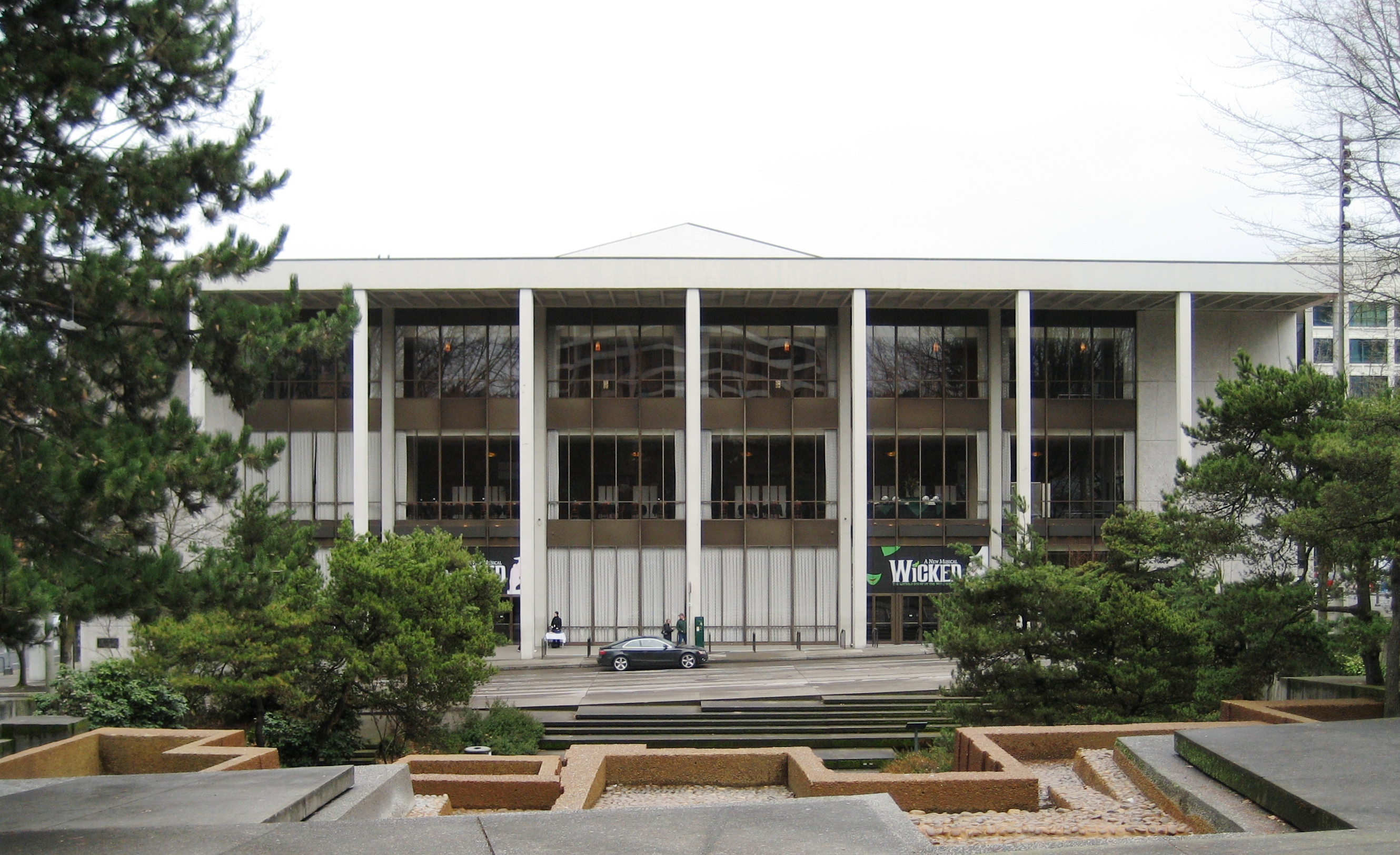
Keller Auditorium

Portland's Centers for the Arts (stylized as Portland'5 Centers for the Arts), formerly known as the Portland Center for the Performing Arts (PCPA), is an organization within Metro that runs venues for live theatre, concerts, cinema, small conferences, and similar events in Portland, Oregon, United States.

Established in 1987, the PCPA consists of three separate buildings: the Arlene Schnitzer Concert Hall, Antoinette Hatfield Hall (containing the Newmark, Winningstad and Brunish Theatres), and Keller Auditorium. Metro took over management from the City of Portland in 1989.

Hatfield Hall itself is sometimes erroneously referred to as the Portland Center for the Performing Arts. PCPA is the fifth-largest center for performing arts in the United States, with more than 1,000 performances and one million patrons annually (as of 2007).

PCPA changed its name to "Portland'5 Centers for the Arts" in 2013. The "5" in the brand name is intended to highlight that the organization has five venues, counting separately the three theaters that occupy Antoinette Hatfield Hall.

The PCPA buildings have continued to be owned by the city, and the city plans to take back management in 2027.

== Performance Facilities ==
The center includes five distinct performance facilities with varying capacities:

- Newmark Theatre (880 seats)
- Dolores Winningstad Theatre (304 seats)
- Brunish Theatre (200 seats)
- Arlene Schnitzer Concert Hall (2,776 seats)
- Keller Auditorium (2,992 seats)

The Newmark, Winningstad and Brunish Theatres are all located together in the Hatfield Hall building, which is across the street from the Arlene Schnitzer Concert Hall, with the Keller Auditorium a half-mile to the southeast.

== See also ==
- Culture of Portland, Oregon
- List of concert halls
- Mark Hatfield
