= Weed the People =

2015 cannabis event in Portland, Oregon

Weed the People: A Cannabis Legalization Celebration
- Promotional poster for the event
- Date: July 3, 2015
- Time: 2–9pm
- Venue: Metal Craft Fabrication; 723 North Tillamook Street
- Location: Portland, Oregon, U.S.; 45.5381°N 122.6740°W
- Theme: Cannabis
- Organised by: Portland Mercury; The CO2 Company; Oregon's Cannabis Concierge; Josh Taylor
- Participants: 1,500–2,000

"Weed the People", officially "Weed the People: A Cannabis Legalization Celebration", was an event held in Portland on July 3, 2015, two days after recreational marijuana became legal in the U.S. state of Oregon. Sponsored by the Portland Mercury and two cannabis companies, the event was attended by an estimated 1,500–2,000 people, who were provided up to seven grams of marijuana for immediate consumption or to take home. Organizers complied with restrictions on recreational sales by distributing free cannabis and required attendees to pay an entry fee. More than 1,300 tickets were sold, but the building's 500-person capacity meant long wait times to enter. Media outlets reported on the historic nature of the event, which was described as a "stoner's paradise" and a celebration of freedom.

== Background and planning ==
"Weed the People: A Cannabis Legalization Celebration", or simply "Weed the People", was held two days after recreational marijuana became legal in Oregon. The Burnside Burn, which was organized by Portland NORML and held on the Burnside Bridge starting at midnight on July 1, 2015, preceded the event. "Weed the People" was sponsored by the local alternative weekly newspaper the Portland Mercury and two cannabis businesses—The CO2 Company and Oregon's Cannabis Concierge. It was produced by Connie Wohn, who said enthusiasm and demand were high. The event sold out quickly (by June 24–26), and there was a waiting list with 750 additional interested participants. The Mercury's cannabis correspondent Josh Taylor, who organized "Weed the People", said the event "celebrates the throwing off of oppression and the freedom of legalization". Referring to the observance of Independence Day on July 4, he said: "And now, people can watch the fireworks tomorrow while high. They were probably going to do that anyway, but we're just helping them along."

According to Wohn, event organizers were prepared and met with "any agency that could've had any sort of recourse or legal ramification on this event". The Portland Police Bureau "gave it their blessing" and did not have a large presence. Security guards were hired to perform bag searches and enforce a ban on outside alcohol and cannabis consumption. The promotional poster for "Weed the People" had patriotic imagery depicting an eagle carrying a stem of marijuana leaves in one talon and several joints in the other.

== Event ==
The alcohol-free celebration, believed to be the "first formal event with free cannabis giveaways", took place from 2:00–9:00 pm at Metal Craft Fabrication (or MCF Craft Brewing Systems), a former craft brewery and industrial building in the North Portland section of Eliot. Between 1,500 and 2,000 participants were supplied with up to seven grams of marijuana, which they could consume openly at the event or take home. Organizers complied with a temporary limit on recreational sales by distributing free cannabis and had attendees pay a $40 entry fee. Most attendees were from the Portland metropolitan area, but residence in Oregon was not required; some attendees were from as far away as Idaho and Michigan. Inside the venue there were cannabis plants, a lounge (or "chill out area") with seating and music, smoking devices, cannabis and food vendors, and a "Grow Garden" where attendees picked up their free samples; out back was a fenced-in yard with an on-site taco truck. Guests also had the opportunity to meet farmers and producers from local businesses and dispensaries.

"Weed the People" had a few complications: organizers sold 1,336 tickets and were prepared to supply enough product for all attendees, but the building's capacity was 500, resulting in long entry lines. Hot temperatures both inside and outside the building resulted in at least two people fainting and a visit from the local fire department for medical treatment. However, people were reportedly patient as they waited in lines. There were no personal disputes during the event, and there were enough cannabis products for all attendees.

== Commentary ==
Jamie Hale of The Oregonian called the event "historic" and "a veritable stoner's paradise", writing:

In a city where recreational marijuana events have struggled just to get off the ground, Weed the People represented an effort that, while it had its issues, was unprecedented ... In cities around the country, carrying around seven grams of cannabis can mean serious jail time. In Portland on Friday, it was a cause for celebration ... It meant freedom to consume a drug people many had already been consuming, it meant freedom from fear of arrest for doing so, it meant the opportunity to smoke, to eat and to vaporize freely—a freedom many in Oregon will be exercising enthusiastically.

Willamette Week's Martin Cizmar said the event was described as a "shitshow" on social media, and believed "Weed the People" was a financial success. KATU's Reed Andrews described the event as the "first of its kind" and said it "is testing the limits for what's legal when it comes to marijuana in Oregon". Sam Catherman of The State Column described the event as "a gathering that connected entrepreneurs and enthusiasts who were excited about the burgeoning industry in their state". The Stranger's Christopher Frizzelle ended his reporting on the event with, "Happy freedom day, everyone. What a country." Keegan Hamilton of Vice News described the event as a "veritable weed Disneyland" and "a celebration of newfound freedom". He added: "More than just giving Oregon residents and visitors the opportunity to exercise their new legal right to get high, 'Weed the People' illustrated how vast the market is for marijuana and related products, and how strange it is that the drug is now technically legal to possess but illegal to procure for people who haven't received authorization from a doctor."

== See also ==
- Culture of Portland, Oregon
