= David Mathison =

American author, blogger and speaker

- Born: August 10, 1960 (age 66); Baldwin, New York, U.S.
- Education: SUNY Brockport (BA); Columbia University
- Occupations: Author, New Media Entrepreneur
- Writing career
- Notable work: Be The Media (2009)
- Website: www.bethemedia.com

David Mathison (born August 10, 1960) is an American author, blogger, speaker, entrepreneur, new media activist and event producer. He is best known for his book, Be The Media, an encyclopedic guide to how individuals, organizations, and non-profits can use new media platforms to become content creators and distributors and reach audiences previously reserved for giant corporations.

== Life and early career ==
Mathison was born in Baldwin, Nassau County, New York, earned his B.A. in international affairs and political science from the State University of New York at Brockport in 1984, and received a Master's degree in international affairs from Columbia University in 1995.

After earning his B.A., he worked in the early software industry and, in 1994, joined Reuters NewMedia, where he pioneered online content syndication, creating and launching a service called Target News in 1998.

In 1999, he founded the Kinecta Corporation, which provided infrastructure that streamlined internet content delivery and syndication. In 2002, Kinecta was acquired by the Stellent, Inc., which was acquired by Oracle Corporation in 2006 for $440 million. In 2001, he founded the natural E creative group, a diversified media company specializing in print, digital publishing and event production for such non-profit organisations as Home Aid America, and digital and tech industry events such as the Chief Digital Officer Summit. In 2011, Mathison joined the international recruiting firm Chadick Ellig to launch a digital media department.

== Be the Media ==
Mathison's book, Be the Media, published in 2009, is a guide to content creation and distribution for individual creators across all media. Mathison and Be the Media were featured in an Associated Press story after over 5,000 copies were pre-sold in eleven days by Mathison on social media platforms such as Twitter and Facebook. The book has been used in course work in major journalism, media and communication schools such as Columbia University School of Journalism, Ithaca College, and the Nieman Journalism Lab at Harvard University's Nieman Foundation for Journalism.

Mathison is the host of an award-winning radio show, Be The Media on BlogTalkRadio.

== Philanthropy and activism ==
In April 2010, Mathison founded HomeAid.net, an annual campaign and event to benefit America's homeless, with Ken Kragen, who was instrumental in producing "We Are the World". Mathison is on the board of directors of HomeAid America, which builds and renovates multi-unit shelters for America's temporarily homeless families and individuals, and Speakers Without Borders, an international non-profit organisation created to support professional speakers who are committed to inspiring the human spirit in under-served communities though the power of the spoken word.

Mathison, through bethemedia.org, takes an active role in such issues as media ownership, cable provider franchise agreements and net neutrality.

Mathison was on the board of directors of WebHood (Cambridge, Massachusetts), Project Censored's Media Freedom Foundation (Sonoma, California) and the Mountain Play Association (Mill Valley, California) and the board of conveners of the Community Media Center of Marin (San Rafael, California).

== Bibliography ==
- Be The Media (2009)
- Killer Content by Mai-lan Thomsen (Addison-Wesley; 2000) Foreword by David Mathison
- Inside Secrets to Venture Capital by Brian E Hill and Dee Power (John Wiley & Sons; 2001) Interview with David Mathison
- XML Handbook by Brian Goldfarb (Prentice Hall), Third Edition (2000) Contributed article on the implementation of Information and Content Exchange
