= Burnside Burn =

2015 cannabis event in Portland, Oregon

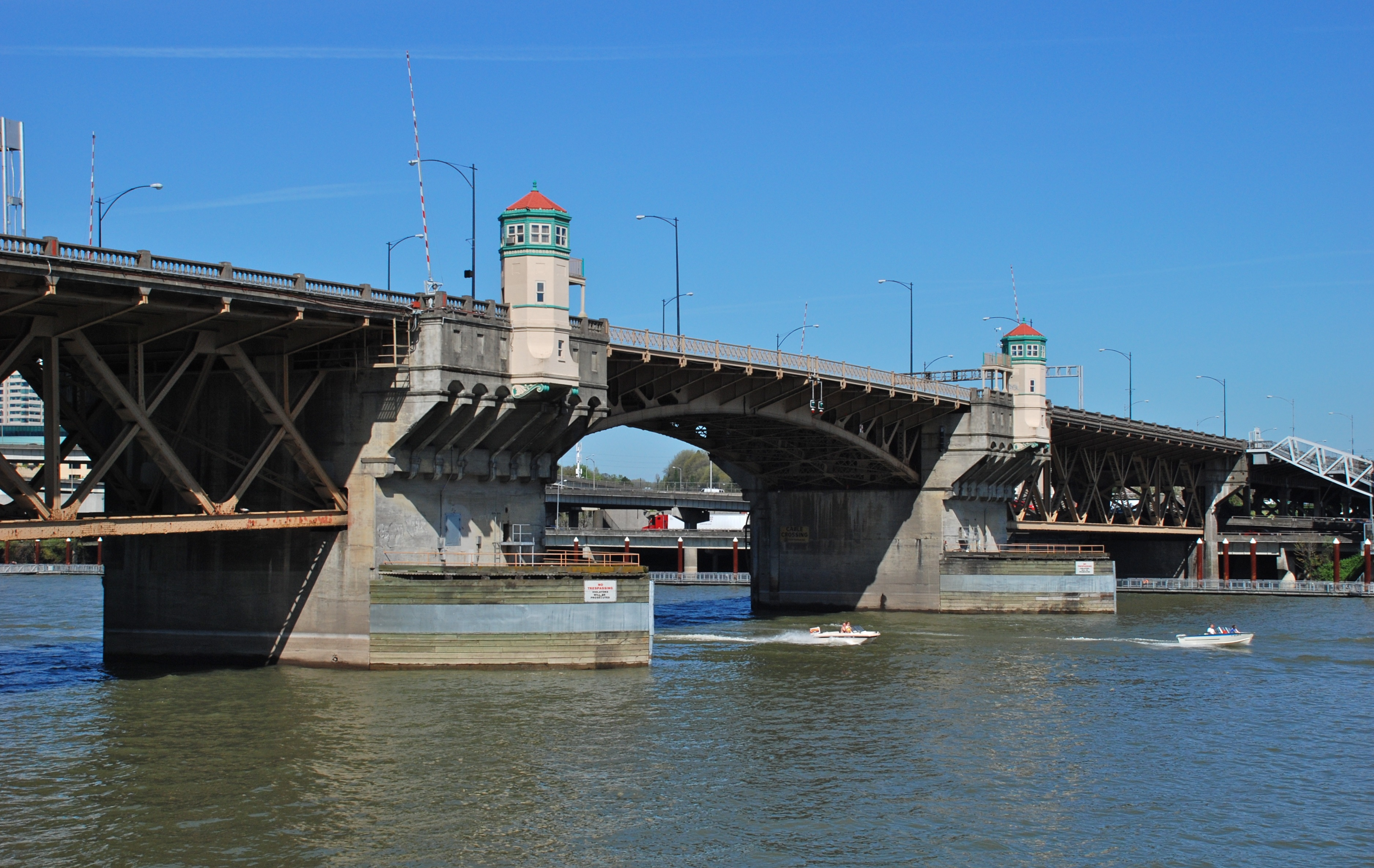
- Portland, Oregon's Burnside Bridge (pictured in 2012), the site of the "Burnside Burn" event organized by the local chapter of the National Organization for the Reform of Marijuana Laws
- Date: July 1, 2015
- Time: Midnight
- Venue: Burnside Bridge
- Location: Portland, Oregon, United States
- Type: Rally
- Theme: Cannabis
- Organised by: Portland NORML
- Participants: Thousands

The "Burnside Burn" was an event held on the Burnside Bridge in Portland, Oregon, starting at midnight on July 1, 2015, the day recreational marijuana became legal in the U.S. state of Oregon. It was organized by Portland NORML, the local chapter of the National Organization for the Reform of Marijuana Laws, having originated from its executive director, who wanted to photograph himself in front of the White Stag sign in the moments after Oregon Ballot Measure 91 took effect. The crowd, larger than anticipated, numbered in the thousands and at times blocked traffic lanes on the bridge. Some attendees wanted to commemorate the moment, while others were motivated by announcements of free marijuana and seeds. No fines were issued for consumption in public. The event was covered by cannabis publications, local and national news outlets, and the HBO television series Vice.

== Description ==
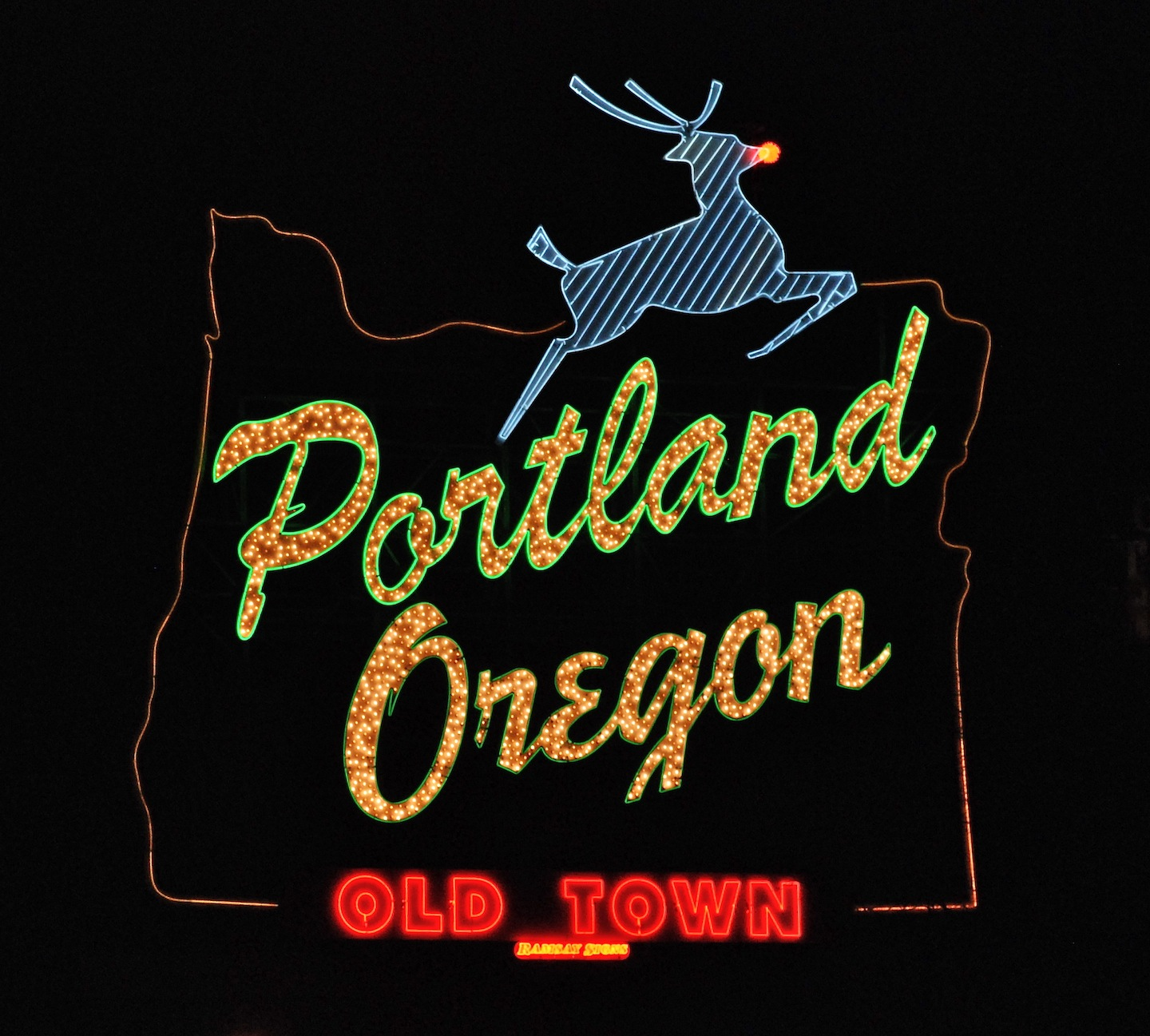
The event began with the idea of taking a photograph in front of the White Stag sign (pictured in 2010).

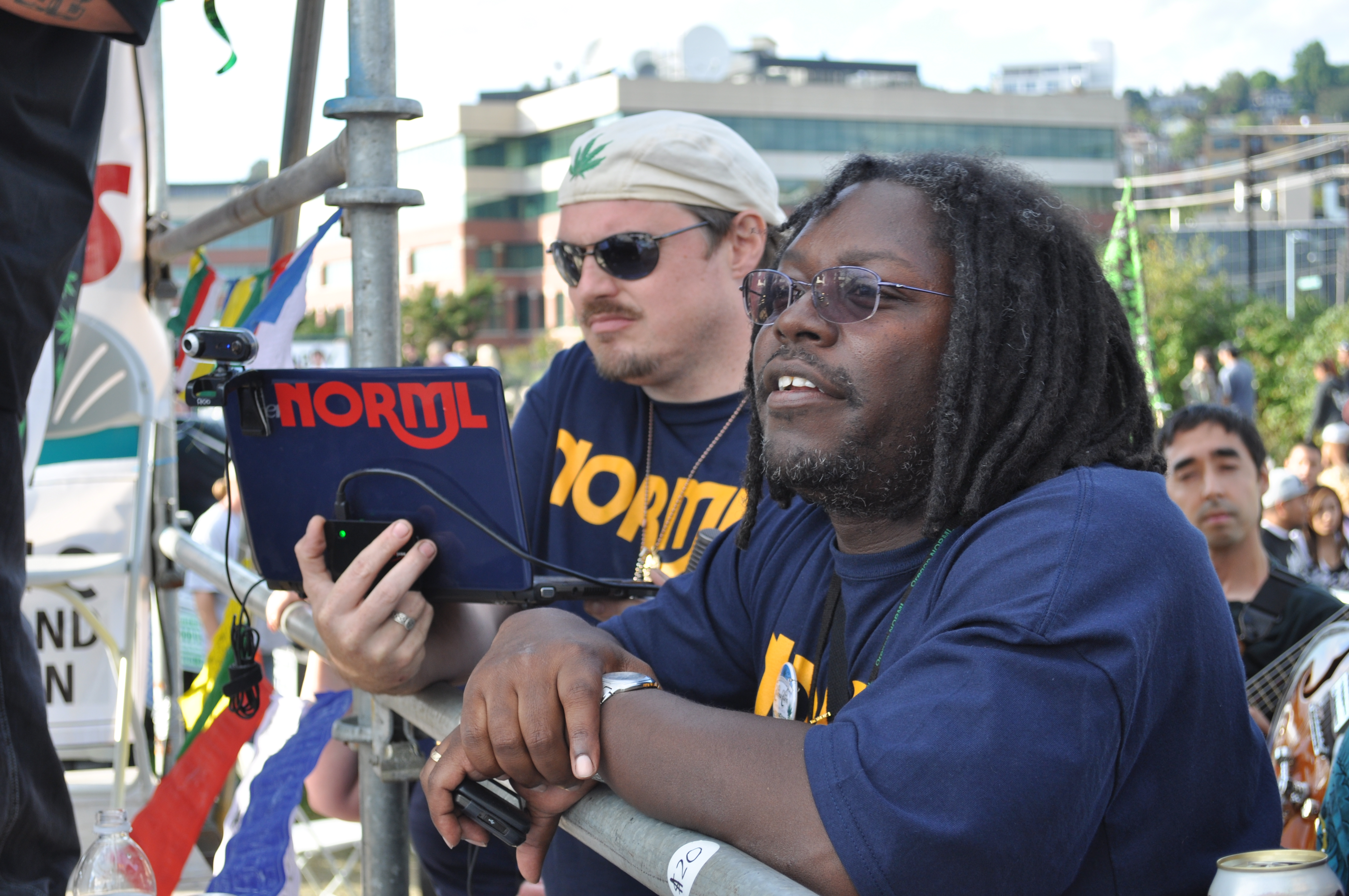
Russ Belville (left), executive director of Portland NORML, at Seattle Hempfest in 2010; Belville shared an ounce of marijuana at the event.

The "Burnside Burn" was organized by Portland NORML, the local chapter of the National Organization for the Reform of Marijuana Laws, in celebration of the legalization of recreational marijuana use in Oregon and to circumnavigate a temporary limit on recreational sales. According to Russ Belville, the chapter's executive director, the event began with the idea of taking a photograph in front of the White Stag sign. He recalled: "It evolved from me saying that when legalization happens, I want to take a photo under the Portland, Oregon sign. Other people said, 'Can we give marijuana away?' [and] I said, 'I can't stop you!'"

On the evening of June 30, beginning as early as 8pm, and into the morning of July 1, 2015, between a few hundred and a few thousand people gathered on the Burnside Bridge's north sidewalk for the free event. The crowd sometimes spilled into the road and blocked multiple traffic lanes, resulting at one point in the complete blockage of west-bound traffic. Activists chanted "Free the weed" and "Fuck the DEA". Cannabis was shared and consumed openly.

The crowd was larger than anticipated and spanned the entire length of the 1,400-foot (430 m) Burnside Bridge. Belville had initially expected "between 50 and 5,000 people", but details of the event spread online and through word of mouth, and ultimately it was estimated that "thousands" had turned out. Some attendees said they were there to commemorate a historic moment, while others admitted having come for free marijuana and cannabis seeds. One man, known as "Pork Chop" (or "Porkchop"), reportedly announced over a megaphone that he had 420 pounds of marijuana to distribute, though his claim was not supported by news outlets. Two women with Ideal Farms, who wished to "share the love", distributed joints to attendees who could prove that they were of legal age. One man distributed drops of hash oil, and Belville himself shared an ounce of marijuana (the maximum allowed under Oregon Ballot Measure 91). Some participants did receive free marijuana, seeds, and/or starter plants, but many did not, due to the larger than expected crowd. Coupons were also distributed for later redemption.

Participants smoked openly and without fear. No fines were issued for consumption in public. Patrol vehicles drove by the scene a few times but did not stop. Prior to the event, police urged residents to avoid calling 9-1-1 to report public consumption, which they did not consider an emergency.

== Commentary ==
The event was covered by cannabis publications, local and national media outlets, and the HBO documentary television series Vice. The Oregonian described the event as "loud and energetic", attracting a diverse and "eclectic" crowd of activists, marijuana enthusiasts, and first-time consumers, some from as far away as Canada and San Diego. According to Willamette Week, attendees ranged from octogenarians to "tweens with rainbow hair" and the crowd was "generally happy". The newspaper summarized, "All and all, the mood was celebratory as befit such a historic occasion."

NORML's Kaliko Castille told The Huffington Post he was "happy to see a community able to come together—peacefully—over something positive. It's great to see people from all walks of life out here, handing out joints to each other and getting to know their neighbors." The Huffington Post's Andy Campbell called the event a "smoke-out with a message" and opined, "Legalization is so much more than being able to smoke a joint in your home without being a criminal. It's a health care issue; it's a tax revenue issue; it saves states millions in the court system; and it ends the hidden costs of prosecution, which emerge when someone can't get a job because there's a possession charge on their record." The Washington Post called the "Burnside Burn" an opportunity for marijuana enthusiasts to "celebrate their new freedom together".

== See also ==
- Culture of Portland, Oregon
- Hands Across Hawthorne, a 2011 rally held at Portland's Hawthorne Bridge
