= Hands Across America =

1986 American public fundraising event

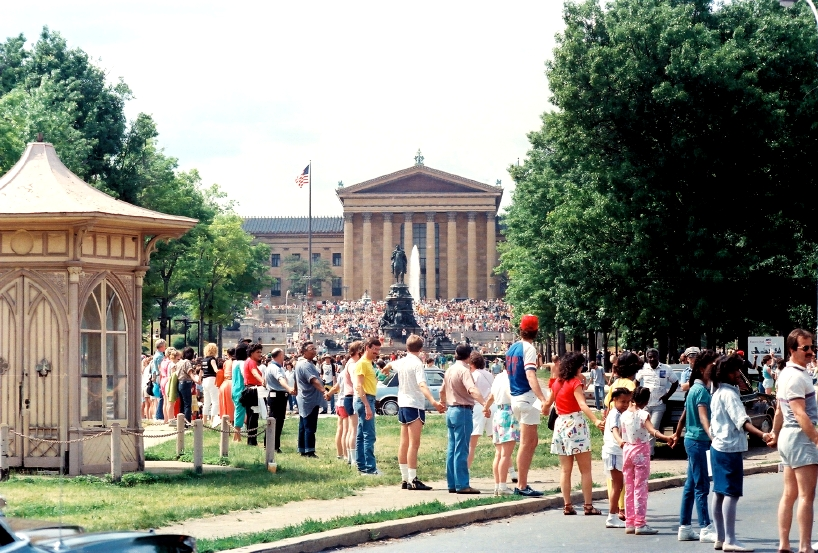
- Hands Across America at Eakins Oval along Benjamin Franklin Parkway in Philadelphia
- Dates: May 25, 1986; 40 years ago
- Location: Across the contiguous United States
- Founders: Ken Kragen

Hands Across America was a public fundraising event held on Sunday, May 25, 1986, Memorial Day weekend, which attempted to create a continuous human chain of people holding hands across the contiguous United States. While approximately 5 million people participated, the chain was broken in many places, particularly in the Southwestern desert. The number of participants would have been roughly sufficient to create an unbroken chain if they had been spread out evenly along the planned route, but most joined the chain in major cities and few traveled to more remote areas. The various gaps in the line between participants were filled using ribbons, ropes, or banners.

Participants were encouraged to donate $10 to be assigned a place in the line. The proceeds were donated to local charities to fight hunger and homelessness and help those in poverty. The event raised about $15 million for charities after operating costs, significantly less than organizers had hoped to collect.

== Event ==
=== Conception and promotion ===
The event was promoted and organized by Ken Kragen, a co-founder of USA for Africa, the charity organization which produced "We Are the World" in early 1985 to raise money to fight famine in Africa. Kragen described Hands Across America as "a logical extension" of the "We Are the World" effort, focusing on the issue of hunger in the United States. Kragen said the idea was first suggested to him by advertising executive Geoff Nightingale at a New York City Ballet performance of "We Are the World". Hands Across America was first publicly announced at a Manhattan press conference on October 22, 1985, featuring Kragen and videotaped messages from Bill Cosby, Kenny Rogers, and Pete Rose. At that time, it was stated that planning for the event had been underway for five months. Coca-Cola agreed to sponsor the event, covering an estimated $18.8 million in operating costs. More than 700 other companies, including CitiBank, McDonald's, Ticketmaster, and Safeway, sponsored and marketed the event.

Hands Across America was unrelated to a previous, unsuccessful project of the same name which attempted to organize a human chain across the country to mark the Bicentennial on July 4, 1976. The 1976 plan was unable to raise enough funds and succeeded only in setting up approximately 8 to 10 miles of chains in and around Chicago. USA for Africa organizers said that they had never heard of the earlier effort until after announcing their plan. Marvin J. Rosenblum, who had conceived of the idea in 1975 and spent a year trying to bring it to fruition, said he found it "hard to believe" that no one in the organization remembered his heavily promoted campaign. However, he was unable to take legal action because his trademark on the name "Hands Across America" had since expired.

A theme song entitled "Hands Across America" was written for the event and was unveiled at a West Hollywood press conference on January 16, 1986. The song was written by Marc Blatte, John Carney, and Larry Gottlieb, and featured lead vocals by session singers Joe Cerisano and Sandy Farina, and the band Toto. On January 18, dozens of celebrities joined hands with hundreds of locals on the main street of Taft, California to film a music video for the song, which was set to first air during the Super Bowl XX halftime show the following week. However, Michael Jackson intervened at a USA for Africa board meeting days before the Super Bowl to insist that "We Are the World" should be played during the broadcast instead. As a result, while portions of the Taft video were seen during the halftime show, the "Hands Across America" song was not heard. The song was distributed to approximately 8,000 radio stations for a nationwide simulcast on the morning of Good Friday, as had been done with "We Are the World" on Good Friday 1985. "Hands Across America" ultimately peaked at #65 on the Billboard Hot 100.

Individual participants in Hands Across America were asked to donate $10 for the opportunity to join the chain, although many people who had not paid joined the line anyway. Celebrities and companies could sponsor portions of the line at a cost of $13,200 per mile, since it was estimated that 1,320 people would be needed to cover a mile of the route. Recording artist Prince was reportedly the first person to "buy a mile" in this way.

=== Organization ===
While celebrities and corporate sponsorships publicized Hands Across America, the task of planning for a transcontinental chain of people fell mostly to political organizers. Fred Droz, a former Democratic Party "advance man" who had become disillusioned with politics after the defeat of Jimmy Carter, became the project's national director. Donna Brazile, future chair of the Democratic National Committee, was the director of Hands Across America in Washington, D.C. Kragen compared the structure of the organization to "pyramid selling", with organizers at the state, regional, and local levels responsible for smaller and smaller segments of the chain, then "mile captains" overseeing each mile and "tenth-of-a-mile captains" at the lowest level.

Particularly in rural and remote areas, organizing the chain required significant logistical efforts. People in cities not along the route were encouraged to apply for an assignment to a place in line, typically a small town a several-hour drive away. An optimal assignment of people to segments of the line was computed by Figi's, a subsidiary of mail-order house Fingerhut in Marshfield, Wisconsin, straining the capabilities of computer technology of the time: Figi's replaced a previous contractor that had been unable to keep up with the volume of applications. These route assignments were then mailed to applicants, along with a packet of instructions on how to get there and where to park, about a week before the event. A less sophisticated alternative was offered by Ticketmaster, which directed callers on its toll-free numbers to spots on the line immediately upon calling.

Bus rides were organized to transport large groups of people to distant spots along the route. Local organizers and communities the chain passed through, many of which had never hosted thousands of out-of-town visitors before, were responsible for providing food and portable toilets for visitors. No major incidents or injuries were reported during the event, and no claims were filed against Hands Across America's insurance policy.

=== The day of ===
In the days leading up to the event, organizers announced that those who had not donated would not be turned away from joining hands, in the hopes of encouraging more participation and creating a more complete chain of people.

Participants were encouraged to bring portable radios and boomboxes so they could listen to a nationwide simulcast of the event, which was broadcast on thousands of radio stations across the country. Leading up to the event, the radio broadcast played "I Want to Hold Your Hand", "Dancing in the Street", and "This Land Is Your Land". At 3:00 p.m. EDT, 2:00 p.m. CDT, 1:00 p.m. MDT, and 12:00 p.m. PDT, Ken Kragen spoke from New York, instructing participants to join hands. Those in the chain then sang along to "We Are the World", the "Hands Across America" song, and "America the Beautiful" – the lyrics to these three songs were published in many newspapers on the day of the event. The event concluded after 15 minutes.

== Route ==
Route of Hands Across America

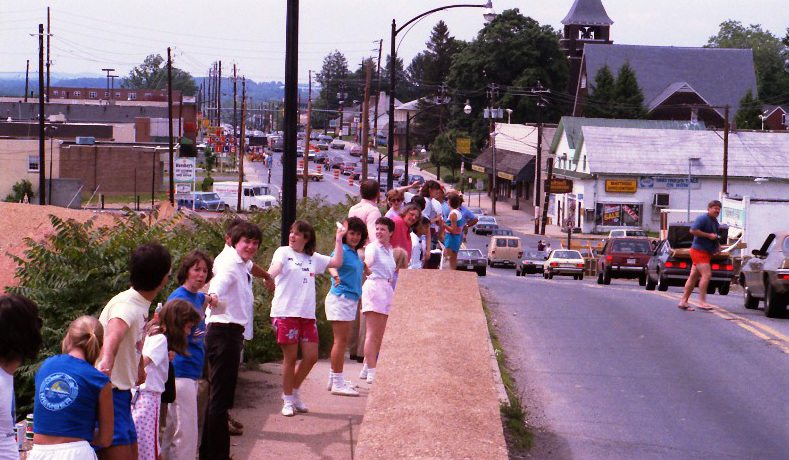
Gaithersburg, Maryland, participating in "Hands Across America" in May 1986

=== New York ===
The eastern end of the chain was at Battery Park in New York City, within view of the Statue of Liberty. The first person in the line was 6-year-old Amy Sherwood, whose family had been living in a local welfare hotel until recently. Notable participants in Battery Park included New York governor Mario Cuomo, mayor Ed Koch, Cardinal John O'Connor, Senator Alfonse D'Amato, Yoko Ono and her son Sean Lennon, Harry Belafonte, Helen Hayes, Lily Tomlin, Bella Abzug, Kool and the Gang, Bianca Jagger, Edward James Olmos, Ken Kragen, and Liza Minnelli. Over 200,000 people joined the line in New York City, five times more than were needed to cover the 12-mile stretch across most of Manhattan, including Glenn Close, William Hurt, and Sam Waterston. On the George Washington Bridge, Brooke Shields and Christy Fichtner (who had been selected as Miss USA five days earlier) stood at the sign marking the border between New York and New Jersey.

The date and time chosen for the event inadvertently conflicted with another charity fundraiser, Sport Aid, a global event organized by USA for Africa on the same day. Since Hands Across America was much better publicized in the United States, only 4,000 runners participated the New York City portion for Sport Aid, which coincided with a special session on world hunger at the United Nations.

=== New Jersey ===
In New Jersey, the route passed through Newark, New Brunswick, Princeton, Trenton and Camden. At Drumthwacket, the New Jersey governor's mansion in Princeton, Governor Thomas Kean was joined by Senator Frank Lautenberg and Joan Rivers.

=== Eastern Pennsylvania ===
In Philadelphia, the line looped around the Philadelphia Museum of Art. Grover Washington, Jr. stood in Fairmount Park, while Pennsylvania governor Dick Thornburgh and several members of the Philadelphia Eagles participated in front of Independence Hall. Joe Frazier Jr. joined in front of his father's gym on Broad Street.

Due to a high level of interest in South Jersey, a spur was added to the route, crossing the Benjamin Franklin Bridge from Philadelphia into Camden, New Jersey and extending southeast as far as Haddonfield before looping back into Pennsylvania. Dionne Warwick joined the line on the Benjamin Franklin Bridge, while Tony Danza and Lainie Kazan participated in Camden.

=== Delaware, Maryland, and D.C. ===
At Delaware Park near Wilmington, horse racing was suspended for 15 minutes so that the line could cross through the racetrack. Pedestrians were not permitted to stand on the Thomas J. Hatem Memorial Bridge between Perryville and Havre de Grace, Maryland, so a group of scuba divers connected the line underneath the surface of the Susquehanna River. In Baltimore, the line passed by the Inner Harbor and Pratt Street Power Plant.

In Washington, D.C., the route passed by the United States Capitol, where Rev. Billy Graham spoke; the White House, where President Ronald Reagan and his family participated; and the Lincoln Memorial, where Coretta Scott King and her children Martin and Bernice joined the line. Reagan had previously said he would not join the chain. However, in the days leading up to the event, the president made a controversial remark that "where there is hunger ... you have to determine that that is probably because of a lack of knowledge on the part of the people as to what things are available". Shortly after his comments were criticized in the press, Reagan announced that he and his family had decided at the last minute to join Hands Across America, although press secretary Larry Speakes denied that there was any connection between the two events. White House staff, Secret Service agents, and members of the press connected the chain through the secured North Lawn of the executive mansion. Reagan's participation was itself criticized by activists, who said that the president's cuts to social programs had dramatically worsened hunger in America. Mitch Snyder led a chain of his own on the opposite side of Lafayette Square in protest, with activists chanting at the president, "What about tomorrow? What about tonight?" Rev. Jesse Jackson stated, "He should not be in the line. His policies created the line."

The easternmost reported gaps in the chain were in western Maryland. A seven-mile segment along Route 355 southeast of Frederick was canceled entirely because it was considered too dangerous, and further breaks were observed in Hagerstown. The Maryland state director of Hands Across America said that 90 percent of the route through the state was covered.

=== Western Pennsylvania ===
The line was initially intended to pass through the playing field of Three Rivers Stadium in Pittsburgh, which would have interrupted a baseball game between the Pittsburgh Pirates and the Cincinnati Reds (whose player-manager, Pete Rose, was a co-chairman of Hands Across America). After the Pirates backed out of that plan, a compromise was reached. Instead, a chain across the field was staged before the game began, and at 3 p.m., a group of 150 Little League players brought the official line into the stadium seats and along the dugout roof. While the official route lined up dozens of steelworkers along the Sixth Street Bridge, locals organized "Boats Across the Allegheny", with dozens of watercraft lined up side-by-side connecting Fort Duquesne Boulevard to Three Rivers Stadium.

=== Ohio ===
The greatest number of participants in the chain of any state were in Ohio, where the route zig-zagged from Youngstown through Akron and Cleveland to Toledo, then returned eastward to Columbus before proceeding southwest to Dayton and Cincinnati. The Ohio Department of Highway Safety took an active role in coordinating its segment of the route and ensuring the safety of participants. The line was originally planned to pass through Port Clinton, but had to be diverted through Fremont after the Thomas A. Edison Memorial Bridge was declared unsuitable for pedestrians. Notable participants in the state included Celeste Holm and Dr. Benjamin Spock in Cleveland, Don Novello in Lorain, Ohio governor Richard Celeste and senator John Glenn in Columbus, and David Copperfield in Cincinnati. At SeaWorld Ohio in Aurora, two orcas and their trainers, along with a sea lion and a baby Magellanic penguin, took part.

=== Indiana ===
The event fell on the same day as the Indianapolis 500, leading to concerns about the logistics of bringing the route through Indianapolis. Avoiding any problems near the Indianapolis Motor Speedway, the route passed through only the northeastern corner of the city near Lawrence. The Indy 500 was rained out and postponed until the following weekend, while the weather also caused lower turnout than expected for the city's segment of Hands Across America. A widely reported human-interest story was that of the small town of Denver, Indiana, where thousands of residents of the larger city of Fort Wayne were expected to join the line, and the route was extended through Denver to accommodate them. However, turnout there also fell well below expectations and the original route bypassing Denver was used instead. Both the weather and the continuity of the line were better in northern Indiana, where the route crossed through South Bend, Michigan City, and Gary.

=== Illinois ===
In Chicago, Illinois, the route ran up King Drive and Michigan Avenue to the Oak Street Beach and Lincoln Park, proceeding from there to the western and southwestern suburbs. Notable participants in the city included Oprah Winfrey at Cermak Road, mayor Harold Washington on a stretch of Michigan Avenue lined with over 1,000 city employees, Illinois governor James R. Thompson and Super Bowl XX champion quarterback Jim McMahon on the Magnificent Mile, Senator Alan J. Dixon in Lincoln Park, and Cardinal Joseph Bernardin in Orland Park.

The route through central Illinois passed through Champaign, Decatur, and the state capitol of Springfield. The Illinois Department of Transportation forbade pedestrians from standing in intersections during the event, so duct tape was laid down along crosswalks and participants held either end of the tape. The small town of Onarga rejected event organizers, and participants who were supposed to be bussed there were redirected to other areas. In Champaign, where the 1985 Chicago Bears had trained for their successful Super Bowl run four months earlier, Walter Payton sponsored a mile of the line, but was unable to attend due to the team's spring practice in Platteville, Wisconsin.

=== Missouri, Kentucky, Tennessee ===
The line crossed the Clark Bridge over the Mississippi River from Alton, Illinois to St. Louis, Missouri, where Illinois senator Paul Simon and Missouri state legislator Mary Kasten joined hands at the state line. In St. Louis, the line passed underneath the Gateway Arch, where actors Kathleen Turner and Eric Douglas joined mayor Vincent C. Schoemehl. A segment near the village of Old Appleton, Missouri, led by activist Wayne Cryts and sponsored by Monsanto, was designated the "American Family Farmer Mile", and 29,000 pounds of food (purchased with grant money raised from Farm Aid) was distributed to struggling farmers who joined the line there.

At Cape Girardeau, the route crossed the Mississippi again, then roughly followed the river's east bank through southern Illinois, Kentucky, and Tennessee. Kentucky's segment included Ryan's Hope stars Christopher Durham and Malcolm Groome in Bardwell and Clinton, respectively, and Mel McDaniel and Peter Fonda at the Tennessee state line in Fulton. The official midpoint of the line was in Ripley, Tennessee, where 14,000 people gathered along a three-mile stretch of U.S. Route 51 alongside Judy Collins, Brenda Lee, the Marshall Tucker Band, Lynn Anderson, Terri Gibbs, and General Hospital's André Landzaat.

In Memphis, the line passed down historic Beale Street, where people grabbed the hands and ankles of the Elvis Presley statue to include him in the chain. Ruby Wilson joined in front of the W. C. Handy statue nearby. Other notable participants in the city included Mel Tillis, Jerry Lee Lewis, and Carl Perkins.

=== Arkansas ===
In and around St. Francis County, Arkansas, one of the poorest regions in the country, the chain was unbroken between West Memphis and Forrest City, but some of the largest gaps in the state appeared west of Forrest City. At the state capitol in Little Rock, governor and future president Bill Clinton, his wife Hillary Clinton and their daughter Chelsea joined the chain. The line also passed through the wards of Arkansas Children's Hospital.

=== Texas ===
The longest segment of the route was in Texas, stretching over 600 miles from Texarkana to Glenrio. East of Dallas, disabled members of Paraplegics on Independent Nature Trips formed a line of kayaks across Lake Ray Hubbard, although they were unable to create an unbroken chain across the lake. The event was undeterred by a storm the previous day which left parts of North Texas flooded. Participants in Dallas included Mickey Leland, Tony Bennett, and Tony Dorsett. Along US Highway 287, which the route followed for a remote stretch of hundreds of miles that passed through Wichita Falls and Amarillo, the roadway was dotted with clusters of people at every mile marker connected by ropes. The Forester Sisters performed on the line in Amarillo.

Kenny Rogers and Lee Greenwood stood on the back of a flatbed truck straddling the border between Texas and New Mexico in the ghost town of Glenrio. Rogers had been featured in television commercials for Hands Across America, telling viewers "Don't leave me alone out there." Thousands of people gathered in and around Glenrio, and the band Renegade performed for the crowd there.

=== New Mexico ===
Lance Guest and Michael Ironside stood in Santa Rosa, New Mexico. Governor Toney Anaya returned to his hometown of Moriarty to participate, along with former governor Bruce King and his family, who lived nearby in Stanley, Robert Prosky, Michael Madsen, Billy Zane, and Tom O'Brien. At Albuquerque's train station, where a transcontinental Amtrak train happened to stop at the appointed time, conductors and passengers joined hands at the depot. West of Albuquerque, a "bikers' mile" featured Mickey Jones. Alex English and Holly Palance participated in Grants. At Red Rock State Park in Gallup, the event coincided with a weekend powwow, and a crowd of over 2,000, predominantly Native Americans, took part. Don Johnson and Rev. Jesse Jackson were expected to attend in Gallup, but neither did. A traditional dance contest at the powwow offered $80,000 in prizes, but only came up with $10,000; the national Hands Across America organization denied that it had promised to fund the contest. New Mexico saw a larger proportion of its population turn out than any other state along the route, although this still represented less than half of the people needed to complete the chain through the state.

=== Arizona ===
In Navajo, Arizona, a segment designated as one of the event's "toughest miles" to fill was sponsored by American Express, and over 1,000 American Express employees and family members joined hands with local members of the Navajo Nation, Ray Parker, Jr., Hervé Villechaize, and Arizona governor Bruce Babbitt to ensure the mile was unbroken. Along Interstate 40 between Winslow and Flagstaff, B.J. Thomas appeared with Hopis, Navajos, and a group of indigenous Bolivians who had traveled to the United States for the event. Ed Begley, Jr. and Thelma Houston stood at Sunset Point near Black Canyon City, north of Phoenix.

The largest gaps appeared in Arizona, where the line crossed through hundreds of miles of desert. Two months before the event, a widely quoted Arizona Republic editorial by Holly Remy questioned the idea of the event: "Ken Kragen has got to be kidding. [...] Now, it doesn't take a heap of gray matter to know what Phoenix is like at the end of May. It is like the inside of a pizza oven. It is so hot that snakes stick to the ground. It is certainly too hot to hold hands." As is typical for Memorial Day weekend in Arizona, temperatures were over 90 degrees on the day of the event. Organizers canceled the portion of the route from Tonopah to Ehrenberg, on the border with California, due to concerns about extreme heat. To symbolically complete the connection, helicopters took off from both towns at the appointed time and met in Vicksburg, where a time capsule was buried in a ceremony headlined by Robert Goulet.

=== California ===
In Blythe, California, an estimated 10,000 people gathered from the Arizona state border to downtown, including Senator Alan Cranston, Bo Derek, Shelley Duvall, and Anson Williams. The segment of the route through the Colorado Desert from Blythe to Indio was canceled due to concerns about extreme heat, and a "human energy ribbon" stretched across this 100-mile gap. However, hundreds of people still turned out in 100-degree heat in Desert Center, near the middle of the canceled stretch, joined by the band REO Speedwagon. Scattered chains of people participated throughout the Coachella Valley in Indio, Palm Desert, and Palm Springs, where temperatures reached as high as 104 degrees on the day of the event. Gerald Ford and Frank Sinatra were among them in Rancho Mirage.

Bob Seger and Charlene Tilton joined the chain in Riverside. Inside the Crystal Cathedral in Garden Grove, televangelist Rev. Robert Schuller led 3,000 parishioners in joining hands, including Pat Boone and state attorney general John Van de Kamp. In Anaheim, Disneyland allowed the line to enter its gates, where park employees and their family members joined hands with costumed characters and Walt Disney Company president Frank Wells.

Cesar Chavez stood in East Los Angeles. A chain made up largely of homeless people ran past the shelters and soup kitchens of Skid Row. At City Hall, mayor Tom Bradley was joined by Drew Barrymore and Leslie Uggams. A loop traversed the Santa Monica Mountains into the San Fernando Valley; a mile there near the Sportsmen's Lodge was sponsored by Steven Spielberg, who was joined by Stacy Keach, Tracy Nelson, LeVar Burton, Richard Dreyfuss, and costumed Warner Bros. cartoon characters. Gregory Peck and Sidney Poitier were in Beverly Hills, while Dyan Cannon, Tom Hayden, and Jeff Bridges stood in Santa Monica.

The western end of the route was in Long Beach, at the mooring site of the Queen Mary. Celebrities in Long Beach included Lyle Alzado, Shari Belafonte, Whoopi Goldberg, Dudley Moore, Donny Osmond, Daniel J. Travanti, Cicely Tyson, Ben Vereen, Raquel Welch, Donna Mills, and Kenny Loggins. Beach Boys tribute band Papa Doo Run Run performed at the Long Beach celebration, joined by Alzado, Loggins, and emerging actor John Stamos. At the end of the line were Bill Jones, Mary Hally, and their five children, residents of a local homeless shelter.

=== Number of participants ===
The following table compares the estimates made by Hands Across America organizers of the number of people needed ahead of the event and of the number of people who actually participated. The total number of participants came close to the estimated total that would have been needed for a single unbroken chain across the country, with estimates of both ranging from 5.4 to 5.7 million. However, many of these participants were in crowds in major cities, where there were often multiple parallel chains, while more remote areas had few or no people present.

State	Miles on route	People needed	Participants	Turnout percentage
New York	25	33,000	150,000	454.5%
New Jersey	88	116,160	200,000	172.2%
Pennsylvania	298	393,360	571,000	145.2%
Delaware	32	42,240	68,000	161.0%
Maryland	164	216,480	180,000	83.1%
D.C.	20	26,400	250,000	947.0%
Ohio	599	790,680	901,960	114.1%
Indiana	274	361,680	350,000	96.8%
Illinois	333	439,560	500,000	113.8%
Missouri	150	198,000	220,000	111.1%
Kentucky	52	68,640	64,000	93.2%
Tennessee	125	165,000	180,000	109.1%
Arkansas	322	425,040	350,000	82.3%
Texas	621	819,720	620,000	75.6%
New Mexico	373	492,360	238,000	48.3%
Arizona	492	649,440	200,000	30.8%
California	346	462,640	400,000	86.5%
Total	4,314	5,700,600	5,442,960	95.0%

== Related events ==
Numerous other human chains were staged across the country at the same time as Hands Across America, most of them raising money for local charities or for the official Hands Across America fund. Organizers estimated that approximately 1.5 million people joined one of these chains. A prominent example was "Hands Across Massachusetts", a four-mile loop through Boston and Cambridge, which was reportedly the only such event to receive the official endorsement of the national Hands Across America organization. Senator Ted Kennedy spoke at the event, where he criticized President Reagan's approach toward the issue of hunger. Kennedy also expressed his wish that more Northern states could have been included as New England is one of the most densely populated places in America. A counterevent had also been staged in Honolulu, where Senator Daniel Inouye and actor Tom Selleck participated in a "Hands Across Oahu" event, where participants remarked "Hawaiians are Americans, too".

The day before the official event, a chain stretching the length of the Golden Gate Bridge in San Francisco, California was staged, featuring mayoral candidate John Molinari and future mayor Willie Brown. Another unofficial but widely reported event took place at Rahway State Prison in New Jersey, where approximately 500 inmates staged "Hands Across the Big Yard" and raised money for Hands Across America amongst themselves. After a Hands Across America organizer presented a video about the event to the prisoners, a group of inmates offered to fill gaps in the Southwest. When that idea was rejected, the inmates staged their own chain inside the prison.

== Legacy ==
Organizers had hoped that Hands Across America would raise between $50 million and $100 million, making it one of the largest charity fundraisers in history. Ahead of the event, Ken Kragen downplayed these expectations, saying "Ten million is a success. Twenty million is an extreme success. Fifty million would basically parallel or outdo 'We Are the World'." The total amount of donations was estimated at $36.4 million, with $27.8 million coming from individuals and another $8.6 million donated by corporations. After covering operating costs, this left approximately $15 million to be distributed to charities. The process of paying the organization's bills and choosing recipient charities took months, and by the end of 1986, no funds had been distributed, drawing criticism from charity groups. The first batch of grants was given out in January 1987, and the last of the remaining money was distributed in November of that year. In selecting charities to receive the money, USA for Africa generally preferred those seeking to produce long-term changes rather than those aiming to provide immediate relief.

Hands Across America was among the last of a series of widely publicized, celebrity-sponsored charity events in the mid-1980s, following Band Aid's "Do They Know It's Christmas?", USA for Africa's "We Are the World", Live Aid, Farm Aid, and Comic Relief USA. By the time Hands Across America was staged, many Americans were growing skeptical of the effectiveness and purpose of these events, and organizers of such events grew concerned that their appeals could have diminishing returns. Live Aid organizer Bob Geldof announced in October 1985 that he would step back from charity work, saying that "compassion fatigue has very much set in". Geldof's comment and the term "compassion fatigue" were frequently used by media outlets in questioning whether Hands Across America's efforts to raise awareness would have any long-term impact. Peter Hansen of UNICEF warned that "we're quickly going to reach the saturation point". A scathing article about Hands Across America and similar events in The New Republic went further, arguing that this wave of celebrity charity events reflected a loss of faith in the ability of politicians and government institutions to solve problems, and was doomed to fail because it could not command the amount of money or long-term focus needed for significant change.

After the runaway success of "We Are the World" and the more modest fundraising of Hands Across America, the USA for Africa Foundation adopted a lower profile, moving out of its offices in Century City and cutting operating costs. Its next fundraising effort, "Brands Across America", encouraged shoppers to send in proof-of-purchase of food products, in exchange for which the manufacturer would donate a portion of the proceeds to USA for Africa.

Hands Across America has occasionally been featured in popular culture, often as a symbol of nostalgia for the 1980s. It was spoofed in a 1989 Super Dave episode as the "Hands Across the Land Charity Drive" (also the episode's title). In a 1992 episode of The Simpsons, "Brother, Can You Spare Two Dimes?", Homer Simpson remembers sitting on the couch while his wife and children, along with the Flanders and Lovejoy families, participate in the event, watching a television which reports that "except for large gaps in the western states, Hands Across America was a complete success". A human chain reminiscent of Hands Across America features in the music video for Michael Jackson's 2001 song "Cry". A 2016 episode of The Goldbergs, set in suburban Philadelphia in the 1980s, centers around characters joining the event. In Season 1, Episode 7 of New Amsterdam, Dr. Iggy Frome, played by Tyler Labine, likens a chain of liver transplants to "Hands Across America, but with livers."

Hands Across America has also been used as a satirical symbol, most notably in the 2019 American horror film Us, directed by Jordan Peele. Peele was inspired by the "eerie imagery" of Hands Across America commercials, as the initiative struck him to be more "for the people who are holding hands to cure hunger than for the people who are hungry themselves." In the movie, Hands Across America inspires the Tethered to overthrow their unwitting oppressors and form a human chain of their own.

== See also ==
- Baltic Way
- Hands Across Britain
- Hands Across Hawthorne
