= Molly Meacher, Baroness Meacher =

British politician (born 1940)

The Right Honourable The Baroness Meacher
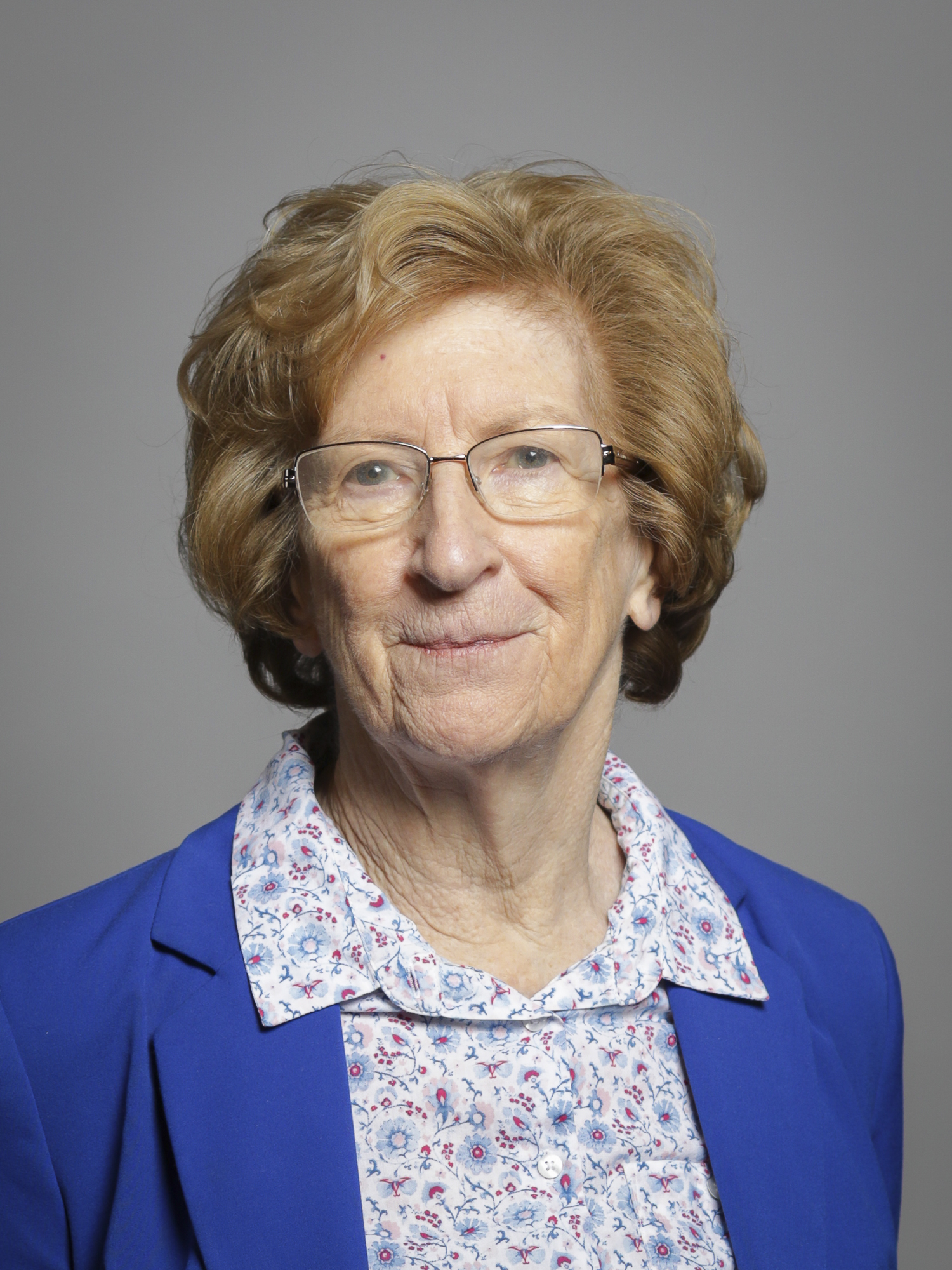
- Meacher in 2019

Member of the House of Lords
- Lord Temporal
- Life peerage 16 June 2006 – 28 October 2025

Personal details
- Born: Molly Christine Reid; 15 May 1940 (age 86)
- Party: None (Crossbencher)
- Spouses: Michael Meacher (m. 1962; div. 1987) Richard Layard (m. 1991)

Molly Christine Meacher, Baroness Meacher (née Reid; born 15 May 1940), is a British life peer and former social worker.

== Education ==
Meacher was educated at the Berkhamsted School for Girls, the University of York, where she received a Bachelor of Arts in economics in 1970, and the University of London, where she received a Certificate of Qualification in Social Work in 1980.

== Career ==
She worked for the Social Services in North London and for the Mental Health Foundation in the 1980s. In 1987 she organised the Hands Across Britain protest against unemployment.

From 1991 to 1994 Meacher was chief adviser to the Russian Government on employment. Following that she became a board member, deputy chair and acting chair of the Police Complaints Authority, posts she held until 2002.

Between 2002 and 2004, she was chair of Security Industry Authority, and in 2004, she was appointed chair of the East London and City Mental Health Trust.

She was chair of the Clinical Ethics Committee for The Central and North West London NHS Trust from 2004 to 2008.

She was chair from 2007 to 2012 of the East London NHS Foundation Trust.

She is president of The Haemophilia Society.

She is a Co-Chair of the All-Party Parliamentary Group for Choice at the End of Life. and since 2016, also the Chair of Dignity in Dying. In October 2021, she read out a statement from Lord Field of Birkenhead in the House of Lords during a debate on the Assisted Dying Bill.

== Parliamentary career ==
On 16 June 2006, she was made a life peer as Baroness Meacher of Spitalfields, in the London Borough of Tower Hamlets, and sat as a crossbencher.

She has been involved in a number of bills including:

- Housing and Regeneration Bill (2008–2009)
- Health & Social Care Bill (2008–2009)
- Children & Young Persons Bill (2008–2009)
- Human Fertilisation & Embryology Bill (2008–2009)
- Health Bill (2009–2010)
- Welfare Reform Bill (2009–2010)
- Crime & Security Bill (2010–2011)
- Equality Bill (2010–2011)
- Child Poverty Bill (2010–2011)
- Police Reform & Social Responsibility Bill (2011–2012)
- Public Bodies Bill (2011–2012)
- Crime & Courts Bill (2012–2013)
- Welfare Benefits Up-Rating Bill (2012–2013)
- Local Government Finance Bill (2012–2013)
- Care Bill (2013–2014)
- Marriage (Same Sex Couples) Bill (2013–2014) including Government Amendment of Baroness Stowell - Legal Status for Humanist Marriages

She retired from the House of Lords on 28 October 2025.

== APPG for Drug Policy Reform ==
Since 2011 she has chaired the UK All-Party Parliamentary Group for Drug Policy Reform, which recommends decriminalisation of drugs. In 2012 she chaired the inquiry panel of the APPG into new psychoactive substances. The panel produced a report, Towards a Safer Drug Policy.

As chair of the APPG for Drug Policy Reform, Meacher is leading a European Initiative on drug policy reform at the request of the President of Guatemala. An interview between Meacher and Italian station Radio Radicale about the trip and forthcoming events was conducted on 26 June 2013.

On 17 October 2013, she led a debate in the House of Lords on UK drugs policy.

== Personal life ==
In 1962 she married Michael Meacher, with whom she had two sons and two daughters. They divorced in 1987, and in 1991 she married Richard Layard, Lord Layard. She and her second husband are one of the few couples both to hold titles in their own right.

== Works ==
- Scrounging on the Welfare (1972) Arrow Books ISBN 0099098806
- To Him Who Hath: A Study of Poverty And Taxation with Frank Field and Chris Pond (1977) ISBN 0140219765
- New Methods of Mental Health Care Pergamon Press (1979) ISBN 0080237150
