= Ken Kragen =

American television producer (1936–2021)

- Born: Kenneth Allan Kragen; November 24, 1936; Alameda County, California, U.S.
- Died: December 14, 2021 (aged 85); Los Angeles, California, U.S.
- Education: University of California, Berkeley; Harvard Business School
- Occupations: Music manager; producer
- Known for: "We Are the World"; Hands Across America
- Spouse: Cathy Worthington (m. 1978)
- Children: 1

Kenneth Allan Kragen (November 24, 1936 – December 14, 2021) was an American music manager, television producer, author, speaker and non-profit consultant, best known for his role in organizing the 1985 benefit record "We Are the World" and the 1986 charity event Hands Across America.

== Life and career ==
Kenneth Allan Kragen was born on November 24, 1936, as the son of Billie Bercovich, a professional violinist, and Adrian Kragen, a noted tax lawyer. His birthplace has been variously cited as Alameda or Berkeley, California. He attended the University of California, Berkeley and Harvard Business School.

Kragen was personal manager to numerous musicians, including country music stars Trisha Yearwood, Travis Tritt, Dottie West and Kenny Rogers for many years. When Kragen was the executive producer of The Smothers Brothers Comedy Hour, he met Kenny Rogers and The First Edition and became their manager. Kragen was the executive producer of their show Rollin on the River.

Kragen married Cathy Worthington in 1978; they had a daughter.

=== Charity events ===
In 1985, Kragen helped secure the singers who appeared on the fund-raising single and album We Are the World. Harry Belafonte contacted Kragen, who was managing Lionel Richie and Kenny Rogers, about putting together a concert to raise money for African causes. Kragen doubted that a concert would make enough of a difference and suggested a charity single instead. He originally envisioned a project with about a dozen artists, but musicians clamored to join, and Kragen ultimately included some four dozen and turned down several dozen more.

The group, known as USA for Africa, included Michael Jackson, Richie, Bruce Springsteen, Cyndi Lauper, Rogers, and many other pop music stars of the day. According to Kragen, who brought on Quincy Jones to produce the song, a record company president suggested that he also organize an album of unreleased songs by the same group of artists. The project ultimately raised $64 million for poverty relief both in Africa and the US. A year later, Kragen organized another charity event, Hands Across America, a human chain across the contiguous United States that involved 6.5 million people. Kragen had been the manager for musician Harry Chapin, who, before his death in 1981, was a leading anti-hunger activist. Kragen, explaining his work on these benefit events, said, "I felt like Harry had crawled into my body and was directing everything." In 2010, Kragen founded HomeAid.net, an annual campaign and event to benefit America's homeless, with David Mathison.

=== Later life ===
Kragen continued to work as a consultant for several companies and non-profits including the Southern California Jet Propulsion Laboratory; the Juvenile Diabetes Research Foundation; and Rallysong100. He recently sold a reality show to Fremantle and was in development on four other shows. He was writing with Tony Robbins the 2015 book entitled Doing well by doing good and was producing an awards show in 2015 for the magazine Live Happy. In 1997 Kragen was a featured speaker at, and consultant to, the Interface Corporation's annual meeting, held in Maui, which won the Global Paragon Award for strategic excellence from Meeting Professionals International. He portrayed himself in the 1996 TV movie The Late Shift about the battle between Jay Leno and David Letterman for The Tonight Show. A dispute between Kragen and Leno's longtime manager and executive producer at The Tonight Show, Helen Kushnick, contributed to Kushnick's departure.

Kragen received multiple awards, including the United Nations' Peace Medal, the Man of The Year from the Boys and Girls Clubs of Southern California, two MTV Video Awards, and one Grammy nomination for the Best Music Video Long-Form. In 2013 he started the course "Stardom Strategies for Musicians" at the Los Angeles' UCLA Herb Alpert School of Music.

Kragen died from natural causes at his home in the Brentwood neighborhood of Los Angeles, on December 14, 2021, at the age of 85.
