= Hands Across the Bridge =

Annual event in the United States

- Status: Active
- Frequency: Annually
- Venue: Interstate Bridge
- Locations: Portland, Oregon; Vancouver, Washington
- Country: United States
- Founded: 2001
- Founders: Patty Katz; Louise Wedge
- Website: handsacrossthebridge.org

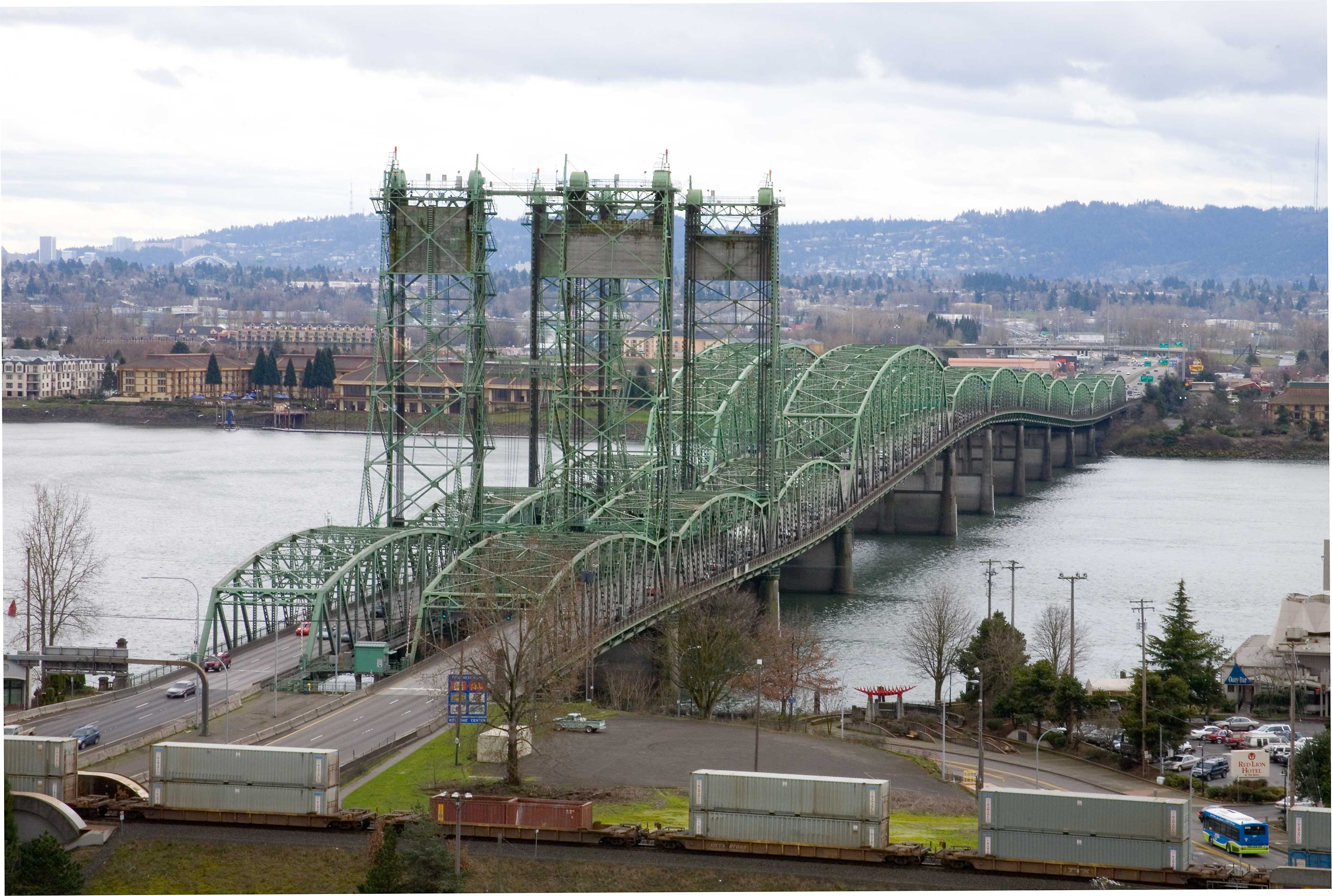
The event has participants hold hands on the Interstate Bridge (pictured in 2007), which spans the Columbia River and connects Portland, Oregon and Vancouver, Washington.

Hands Across the Bridge is an annual event held on the Interstate Bridge connecting Portland, Oregon and Vancouver, Washington, in the United States. Held on Labor Day weekend, the event is part of National Recovery Month and has been held for 25 years.

== History ==
Patty Katz and Louise Wedge established the event in 2001. According to KATU, the event started "with two women in long-term recovery who went from under the bridge of addiction to above it". Approximately 200 people attended the 2002 event, followed by 500 people in 2003.

An estimated 2,000 people participate in 2009. Hundreds participated in 2023 and more than a thousand people participated in 2024. Hundreds of people also participated in 2025 and 2026.

Since the deaths of both founders, organizers have included Alizz Quarles and Tabby Stokes.

== Activities ==
Participants gather in both Oregon and Washington, then meet on the bridge. The Jantzen Beach Holiday Inn in Portland and Esther Short Park in Vancouver have served as starting points. Hundreds of people gathered at Esther Short Park in 2016. In 2023, the park hosted a music festival, Narcon training, and speakers.

Speakers in 2026 included U.S. representative Maxine Dexter and Oregon state representatives Rob Nosse, Tawna Sanchez, and Lamar Wise. The event also featured hand drummers from St. Helens-based Medicine Wheel Recovery Services.

Tugboat blasts have been used to prompt groups joining, the collective raising of participants' hands, and a serenity prayer (a twelve-step program component). Organizers have also shared mental health resources.

== See also ==
- Alcohol abuse
- Alcohol dependence
- Alcoholism
- Drug rehabilitation
- Hands Across Hawthorne, a 2011 rally on Portland's Hawthorne Bridge
