= Hands Across Britain =

1987 protest in England

- Date: 3 May 1987
- Time: 3:00pm
- Location: London to Liverpool

Hands Across Britain was a mass protest campaign against unemployment held on 3 May 1987 in which an estimated 250,000 people held hands in a human chain along a path across London and Liverpool that stretched 350 miles. The idea of a woman named Molly Meacher and organised by the Roman Catholic, Anglican and Methodist churches, the event was based on and named after Hands Across America which held a similar event across the continental United States.

Reaction to the protest was mixed; with campaign organisers marking the event as a "success" despite large gaps in areas in England with others including political leaders labeling the event as a "publicity stunt".

== Background ==
The event was the idea of a woman named Molly Meacher. It was organised as part of a four-month campaign by the Roman Catholic, Anglican and Methodist churches to focus attention towards the social, emotional, spiritual and economical effects of unemployment. Other factors included the encouragement of discussion of realistic policies for the reduction in the number of unemployed and an attempt to change the mood from hopelessness and despair to hope and determination within the United Kingdom. The campaign was also aimed to assist with the attention of employers to find talents among the unemployed. Media personality and charity fundraiser Jimmy Savile was named the president of the campaign and it was announced that it would take place on 3 May to coincide with Jobs Day.

At the time of the start of official campaigning in January 1987, 11 per cent of people were unemployed in the United Kingdom, and it was expected to be a major issue at the 1987 United Kingdom general election. Support was garnered from Cardinal Basil Hume, along with more than 60 celebrities which included Glenda Jackson and Sting. Support also came from the political spectrum with the General Secretary of the Union of Communication Workers Alan Tuffin and the General Secretary of the Trades Union Congress Norman Willis.

== Event ==
Hands Across Britain began after an inaugural service concelebrated by the Archbishop of Liverpool Derek Worlock, bishop David Sheppard and Free Church of England moderator John Williamson at the Liverpool Metropolitan Cathedral. Archbishop Worlock said that the protest was not political in nature.

The chain began at 3:00pm on 3 May 1987 GMT at Hope Street in Liverpool and ended in Downing Street in London. An estimated 250,000 people are believed to have taken part in Hands Across Britain in a human chain that stretched for 350 miles (560 km). This was despite initial figures which suggested around 350,000 people would participate and was mainly down to large gaps in areas such as Staffordshire, Burton-on-Trent, Milton Keynes and Derby where figures stated around 6 to 500 people had joined the human chain in those areas. It was also attributed to inclement weather conditions. The largest cluster of people were observed in city centres and the longest unbroken chain was approximately 5 mi (8.0 km) according to organisers.

Savile broadcast his BBC Radio 1 show from Stoke Mandeville Hospital in Buckinghamshire where he highlighted the additional problems that were faced by unemployed disabled people.

== Reaction ==
Despite the large gaps in areas of England, campaign organiser Molly Meacher said that the demonstration had been a "success" and was at 10 Downing Street to protest against the levels of unemployment. Unemployed Workers' Charter spokesman Marc Fisher said that Hands Across Britain would be regarded as a "publicity stunt". Sheppard asserted the issue of unemployment should be a primary concern in that year's general election. David Young, Baron Young of Graffham, the Secretary of State for Employment, described the campaign as "cynical manipulation" of unemployed persons. He later said he had been misquoted and criticised the organisers for not inviting government ministers to partake in the campaign when other politicians were allowed to.
