= Hands Across Hawthorne =

2011 rally in Portland, Oregon, U.S.

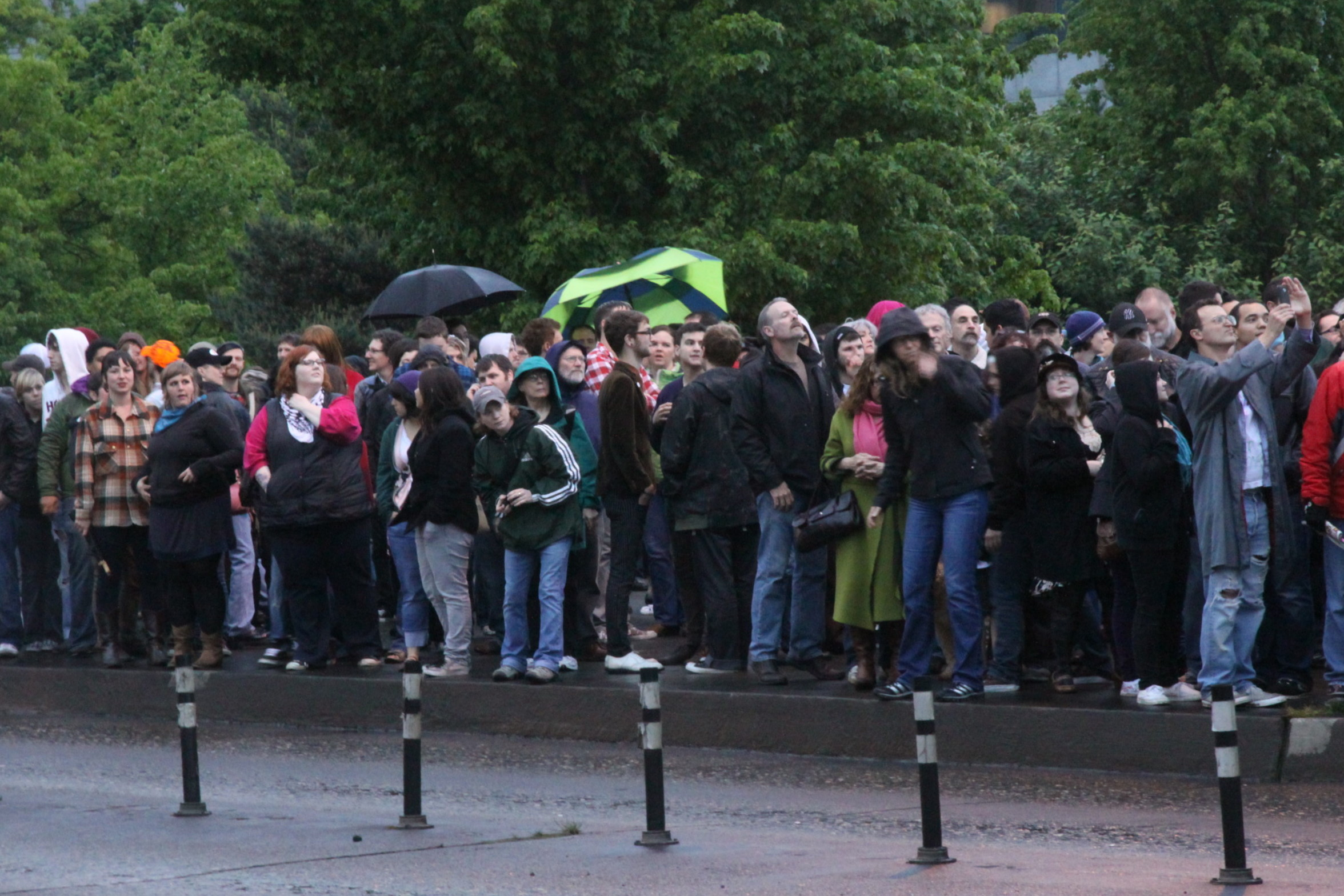
- Rally participants gathered on the Hawthorne Bridge
- Date: May 29, 2011
- Location: Hawthorne Bridge, Portland, Oregon, United States; 45°30′48″N 122°40′16″W

Hands Across Hawthorne was a rally held at the Hawthorne Bridge in the American city of Portland, Oregon, on May 29, 2011. The demonstration was in response to an attack, one week earlier, on Brad Forkner and Christopher Rosevear, a gay male couple who had been holding hands while walking across the bridge. According to the couple and the Portland Police Bureau, a group of five men followed Forkner and Rosevear along the bridge before physically assaulting them. The assault was condemned by Portland's mayor, Sam Adams, and its police chief, Mike Reese, and news of the attack spread throughout the Pacific Northwest and the United States. The attack prompted volunteers from the Q Center, a nonprofit organization that supports the LGBTQ community, to form street patrols as a means of monitoring Portland's downtown area.

Several LGBTQ and human rights organizations sponsored Hands Across Hawthorne in response to the attack, with the purpose of linking hands across the entire span of the Hawthorne Bridge to show solidarity. More than 4,000 people attended the rally, which had been publicized on a single Facebook page 72 hours previously. Forkner, Rosevear, Mayor Adams, and other community leaders spoke at the rally. The event received attention throughout the United States. On June 5, residents of Spokane, Washington, held a similar hand-holding rally called "Hands Across Monroe", crossing the Monroe Street Bridge in Riverfront Park.

== Background ==
=== Hate crimes in Portland ===
Portland Police Bureau statistics showed a decrease in the number of "bias crime assaults", or "hate crimes", from 26 incidents in 2007 to 15 in 2009. In 2010, of just over 50 hate crime incidents reported in Portland, 20 involved gender or sexual orientation, far outnumbering racial hate crimes. In May 2010, a group of men in drag were harassed and assaulted by a group of five men. The filing of a police report resulted in a community forum at Portland's Q Center (a nonprofit organization supporting the LGBTQ community), which was attended by Portland Police Chief Mike Reese, Mayor Sam Adams, and Deputy District Attorney Rod Underhill, together with more than 100 city residents. The attacks led to the formation of the Queer Patrol (or Q Patrols) in July 2010, which consisted of foot patrols specifically designed to protect the LGBTQ community in downtown Portland.

Sarah Mirk of The Portland Mercury attributed the rise in the recorded number of crimes related to gender or sexual identity in 2010 to the increased number of filed police reports, this due in part to the work of the Q Patrols. Hate crimes continued in the city; in November 2010, a man perceived to be gay was severely beaten and left unconscious while walking home in southeast Portland. According to Portland Police, eight bias crimes were reported between January 1 and April 30, 2011, half the number reported during the same period in 2010.

=== Assault ===
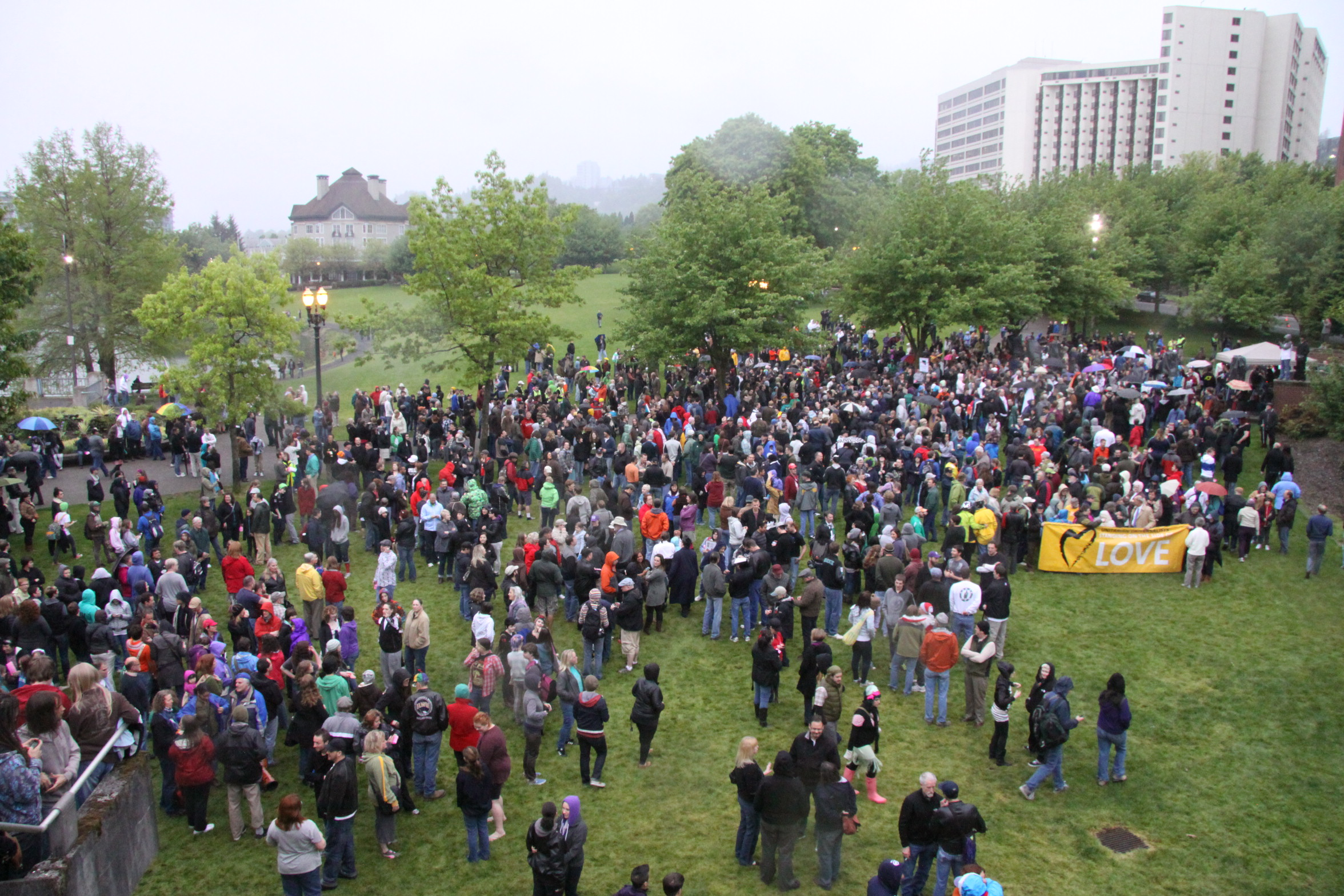
Rally participants crowd at the intersection of Tom McCall Waterfront Park, where the events leading to the attack began, and the Hawthorne Bridge

Brad Forkner and Christopher Rosevear (aged 23 and 24, respectively) were attacked on the Eastbank Esplanade on May 22, 2011, after holding hands while walking across the Hawthorne Bridge in Portland, Oregon. Details of the attack were released by Portland Police on May 24. Forkner and Rosevear said a group of five men followed them from Tom McCall Waterfront Park across the bridge, then beat them as they came down a ramp along the Esplanade.

According to the description released by Portland Police, "as [the couple] walked they knew several men were behind them talking, laughing and pointing but they were not sure it was directed at them." Three of the five men attacked the couple from behind. Forkner was pushed into a railing and punched multiple times before breaking away to call 9-1-1. The attackers reportedly continued hitting Rosevear on the head, face, back and ribs until Forkner was able to call for police help. Forkner later recalled that he did not hear specific homophobic remarks, but believed the attackers may have been yelling in a foreign language. Forkner had swelling on his face, and Rosevear required stitches in his lip. The victims said that several witnesses were nearby, but did not offer help in any form. Police investigated the case as a "bias crime", noting the lack of provocation. As of December 2012, the five men who attacked Forkner and Rosevear remained unidentified.

The attack was reported by newspapers in the Pacific Northwest and by gay-oriented media outlets nationwide. Sam Adams, Portland's gay mayor, and Police Chief Mike Reese both spoke out against the attack. Adams said, "We seek to be the city of the most equal opportunity, and we can only be that city if all people are safe and have a sense of safety on our streets and in our parks." CAP Northwest (formerly Cascade AIDS Project), where Forkner was the Pivot Center Coordinator at the time, launched a Facebook campaign following the attack called "Holding Hands, In Solidarity", encouraging people to post pictures of hand-holding. The Q Center also condemned the attack. The assault once again prompted Q Center volunteers to form Q Patrols as a means of monitoring the streets and reporting hate crimes to police. Plans were made to have Q Patrols available between 11 pm and 3 am until the weekend of Halloween.

== Rally ==
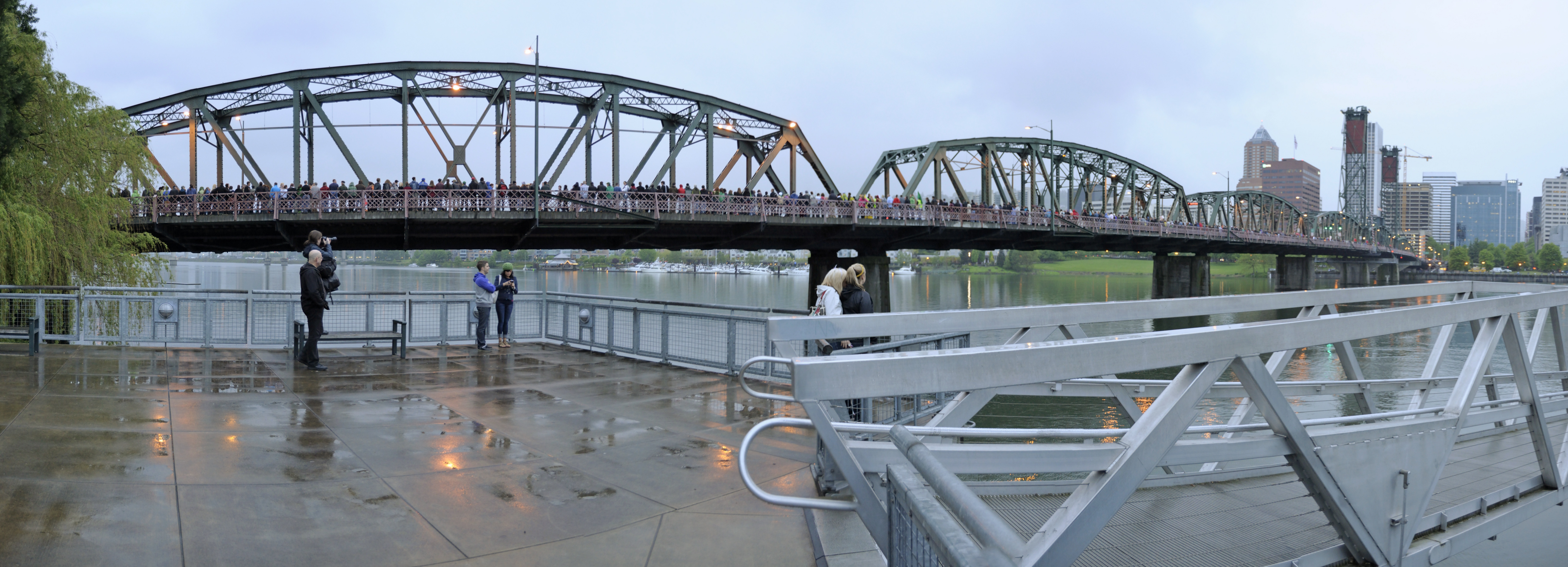
Hands Across Hawthorne participants spanning the Hawthorne Bridge in Portland, Oregon, on May 29, 2011

Following the attack, Basic Rights Oregon (BRO), Cascade AIDS Project, Pride Northwest, the Q Center, and local churches organized a rally to link hands spanning the length of the Hawthorne Bridge to show solidarity. The event was publicized by a single Facebook page, created only 72 hours previously from CAP Northwest's hand-holding photo gallery. Stephen Cassell, event organizer and Q Center board member, reportedly "thought of the action plan in the middle of the night and quickly posted the idea on Facebook." The organization Progressive Oregon, which advocates for progressivism within that state, also advertised the event.

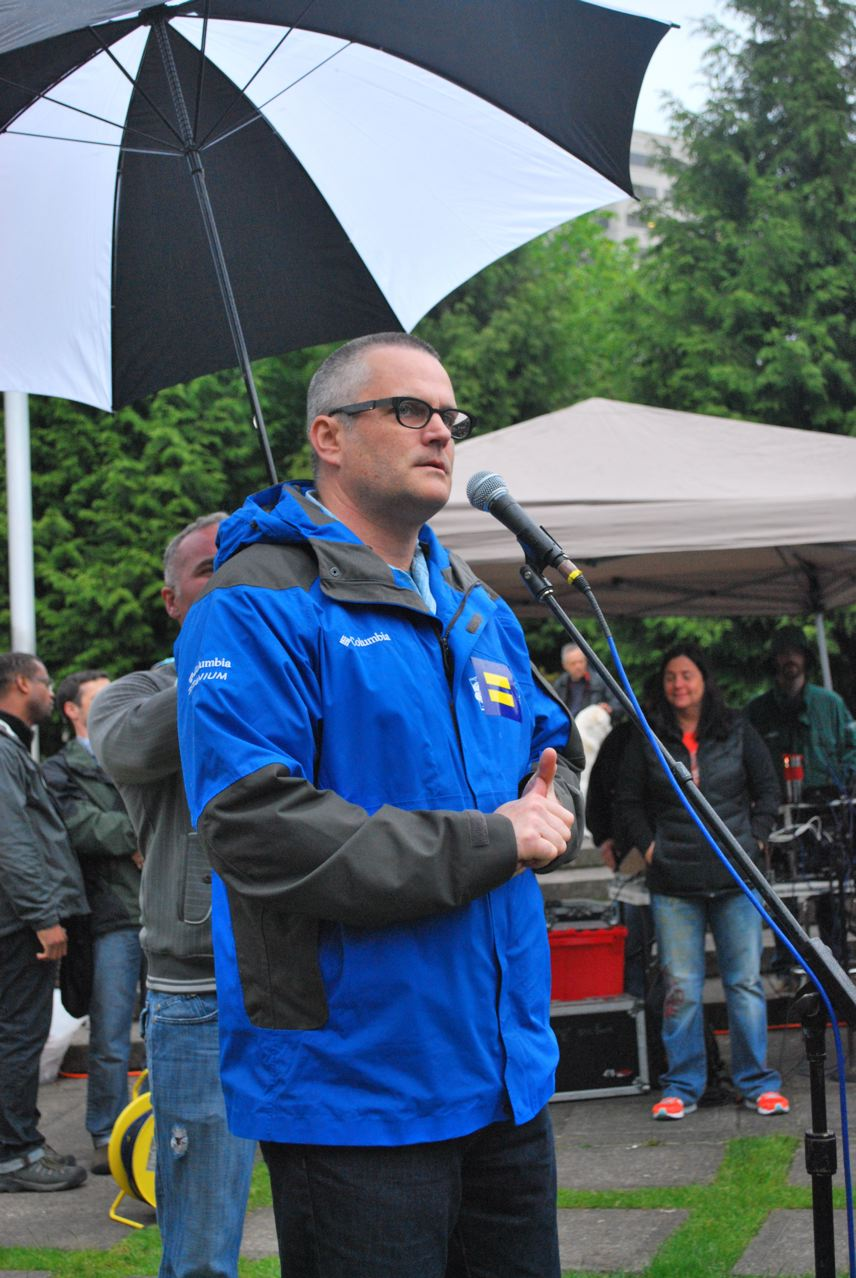
Mayor Sam Adams speaking at the rally

More than 4,000 people attended the event, which began at 7:30 pm. Members of the Community of Welcoming Congregations, a coalition of more than 100 congregations in Oregon that welcome members of the gay community, and the Portland chapter of the Human Rights Campaign, also attended the rally. As demonstrators gathered at the west side of the bridge, the rally began with speeches by Forkner and Rosevear. Forkner said that this was not the first time he had feared for his safety, nor did he expect it to be the last:

Thousands of people walk the streets of America and yes, even Portland, feeling like they are less than human, that their life is not as valued by society as their other, supposedly more "normal", peers. The effects of this internalized hatred are endless. They contribute to gang violence, to depression, to self-medicating via alcohol and drug abuse, to sexuality that people feel must be kept secret, explored in dark alleys and bathhouses rather than openly and safely. How can we talk about keeping ourselves safe, about being healthy, about being loved, if we are doing so in secret, if we are hurting in silence?

Following Forkner's speech, Basic Rights Oregon executive director Jeana Frazzini thanked the couple, spoke of the symbolism of the hand-holding rally, and encouraged supporters to volunteer for the Q Patrol. During the rally, the crowd sang the Beatles' "I Want to Hold Your Hand".

According to Cassell, Hands Across Hawthorne marked one of the first instances where Portland's major LGBTQ rights organizations worked together on an event other than the Portland Pride Festival. Details of the rally were reported by various publications. The Huffington Post contributor Chuck Currie, a United Church of Christ minister from Portland, used the attack and rally to question the impact of conservative evangelical religion and other anti-gay-rights organizations. Progressive Oregon and Just Out (an LGBTQ newspaper in Portland) noted the failure of the city's largest newspaper, The Oregonian, to cover the rally; the former sent a letter and petition to the paper's publisher N. Christian Anderson III, requesting "fair and balanced" coverage. Peter Bhatia, editor for The Oregonian, responded to the criticism and petition signed by more than 1,400 people by saying the paper's lack of coverage was a "mistake" caused by "human error".

One week after the rally, Mayor Sam Adams and his staff linked hands at Portland City Hall in solidarity. On June 5, residents of Spokane, Washington, held a similar hand-holding rally in solidarity with the Portland community called "Hands Across Monroe", crossing the Monroe Street Bridge in Riverfront Park. That event was sponsored by The LGBT Center.

== See also ==
- Culture of Portland, Oregon
- Hands Across America
- Hands Across the Bridge, annual event
- Hate crime laws in the United States
- History of violence against LGBTQ people in the United States
