= Portland NORML =

Cannabis organization

- Logo

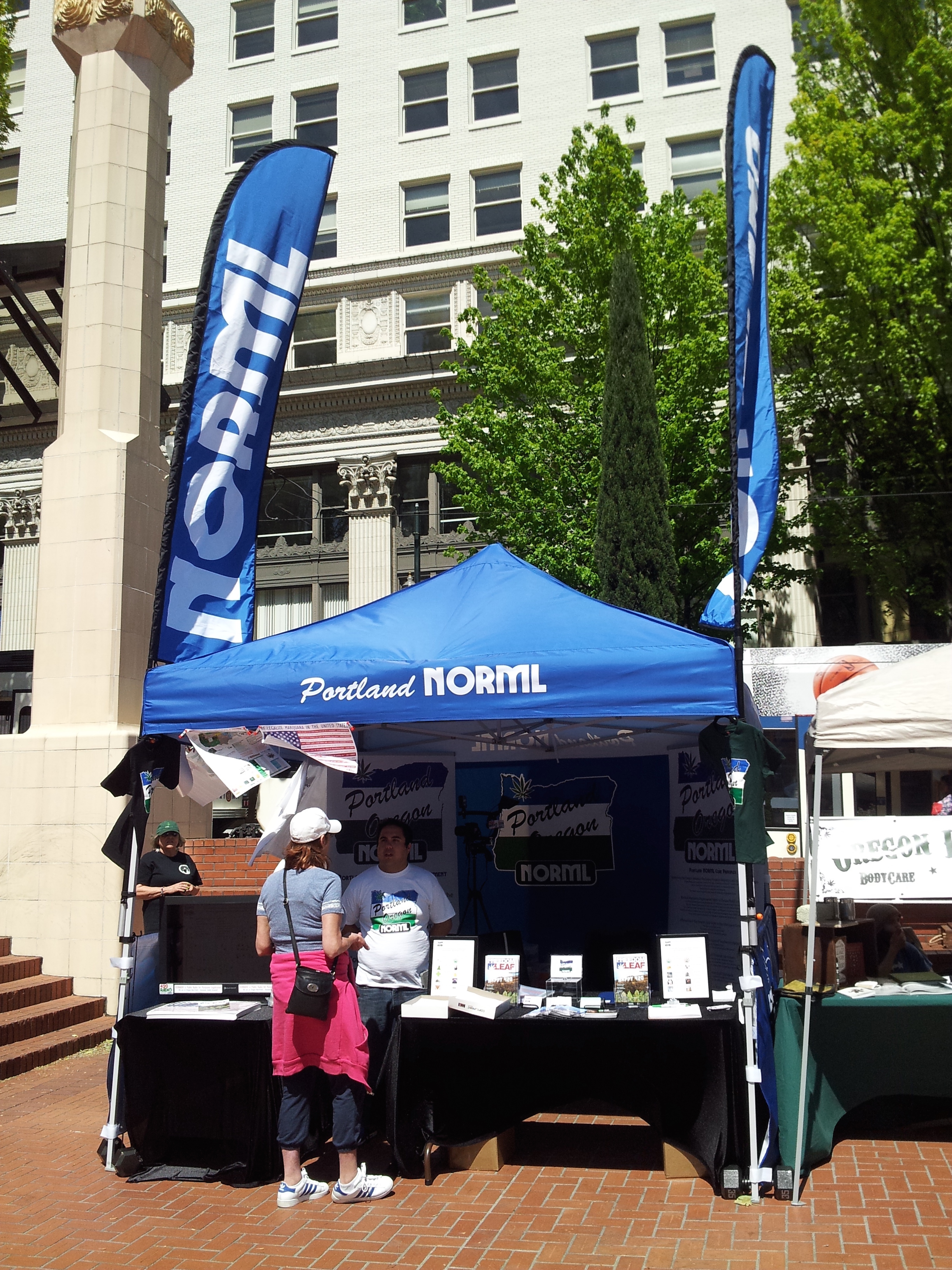
- Portland NORML representation at the Global Cannabis March in Portland, Oregon in 2015
- Location: Portland, Oregon, United States
- Executive Director: Scott Gordon
- Parent organization: National Organization for the Reform of Marijuana Laws (NORML)
- Website: portlandnorml.org

Portland NORML is the National Organization for the Reform of Marijuana Laws (NORML) affiliate for Portland, Oregon, in the United States. The chapter was established in January 2015 by Portland-based radio host and cannabis activist Russ Belville. Scott Gordon serves as its executive director.

In 2015, Portland NORML organized the Burnside Burn in celebration of the legalization of recreational marijuana use in Oregon.

In 2016, Portland NORML treasurer, Randy Quast was appointed interim director of national NORML, replacing outgoing director Allen St. Pierre.

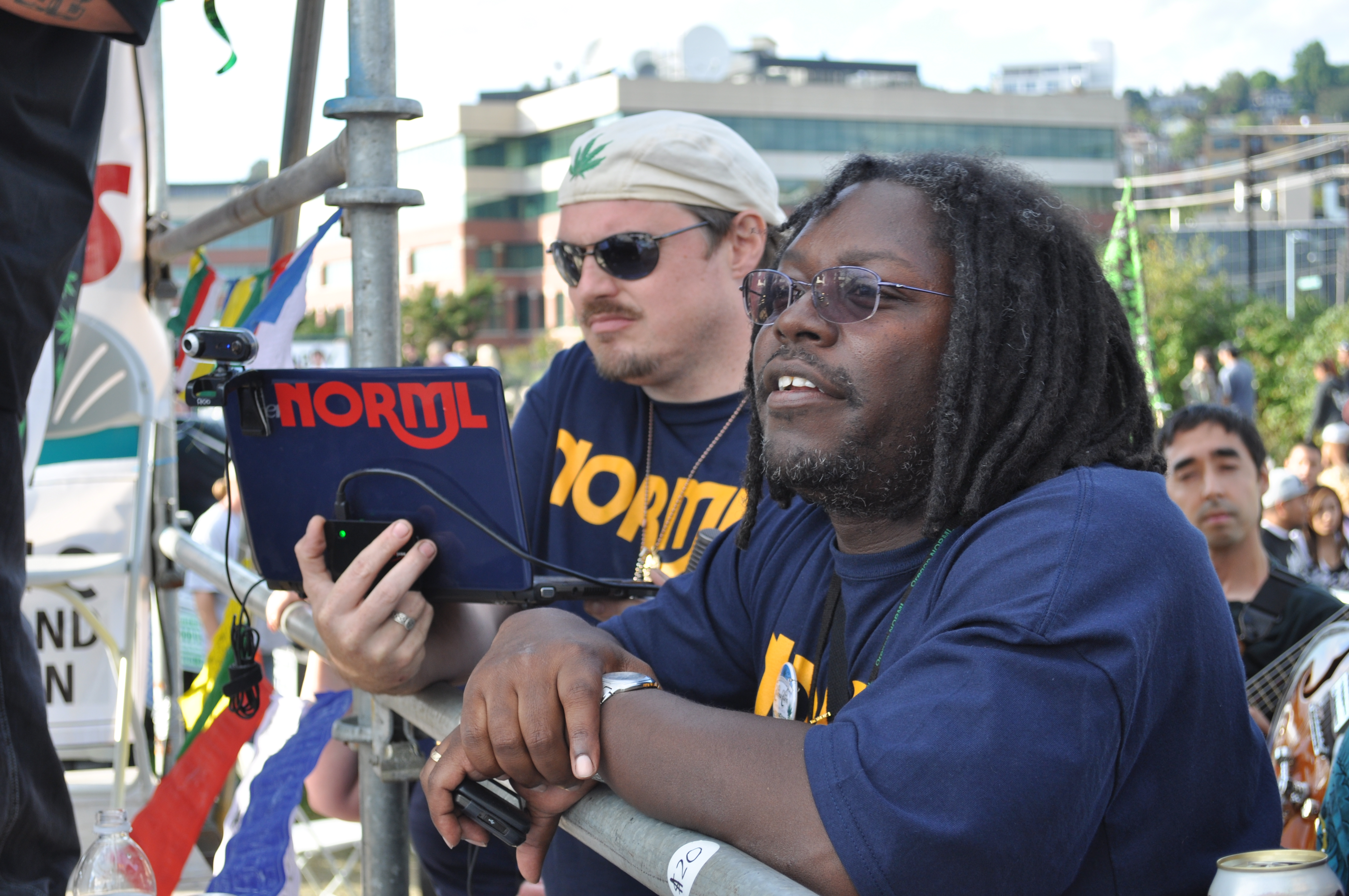
Russ Belville (left) of Portland NORML at Seattle Hempfest in 2010
