= Coffee in Portland, Oregon =

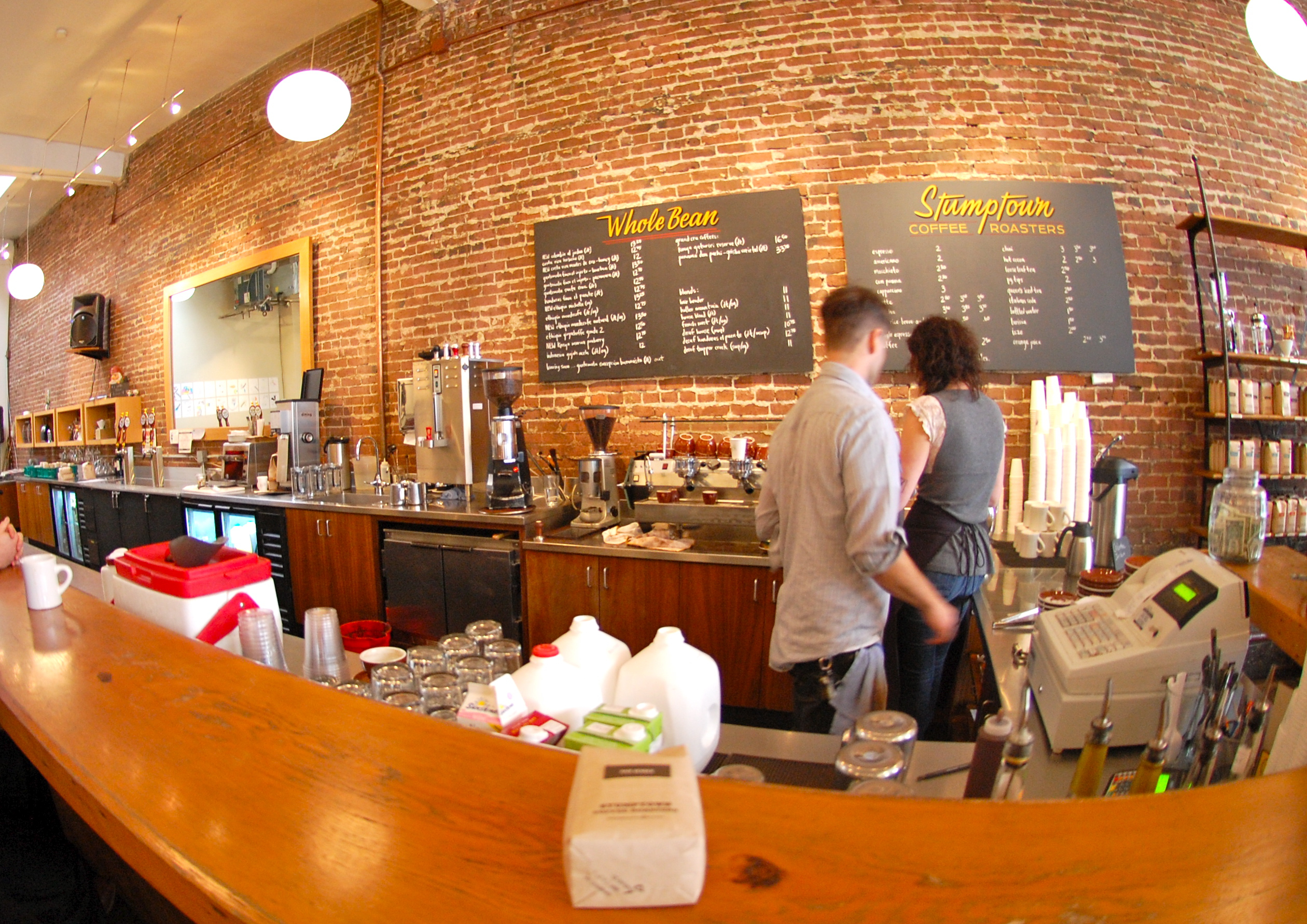
Stumptown Coffee Roasters cafe in downtown Portland, Oregon, 2009

Portland, Oregon, in the United States, is known for having an established coffee culture. In February 2012, The New York Times reported that Portland had more than 30 coffee roasters. Comparing Portland's coffee culture to other major cities along the West Coast, Oliver Strand wrote: "Seattle coffee might have more muscle, and San Francisco coffee might have more mystique, but Portland's coffee scene is arguably the country's most intimate. It's also one of the most relaxed."

Portland is noted as a place in which people use coffeehouses as a third place. There is more coffee available in gentrified areas of Portland.

== Coffeehouses and roasters ==
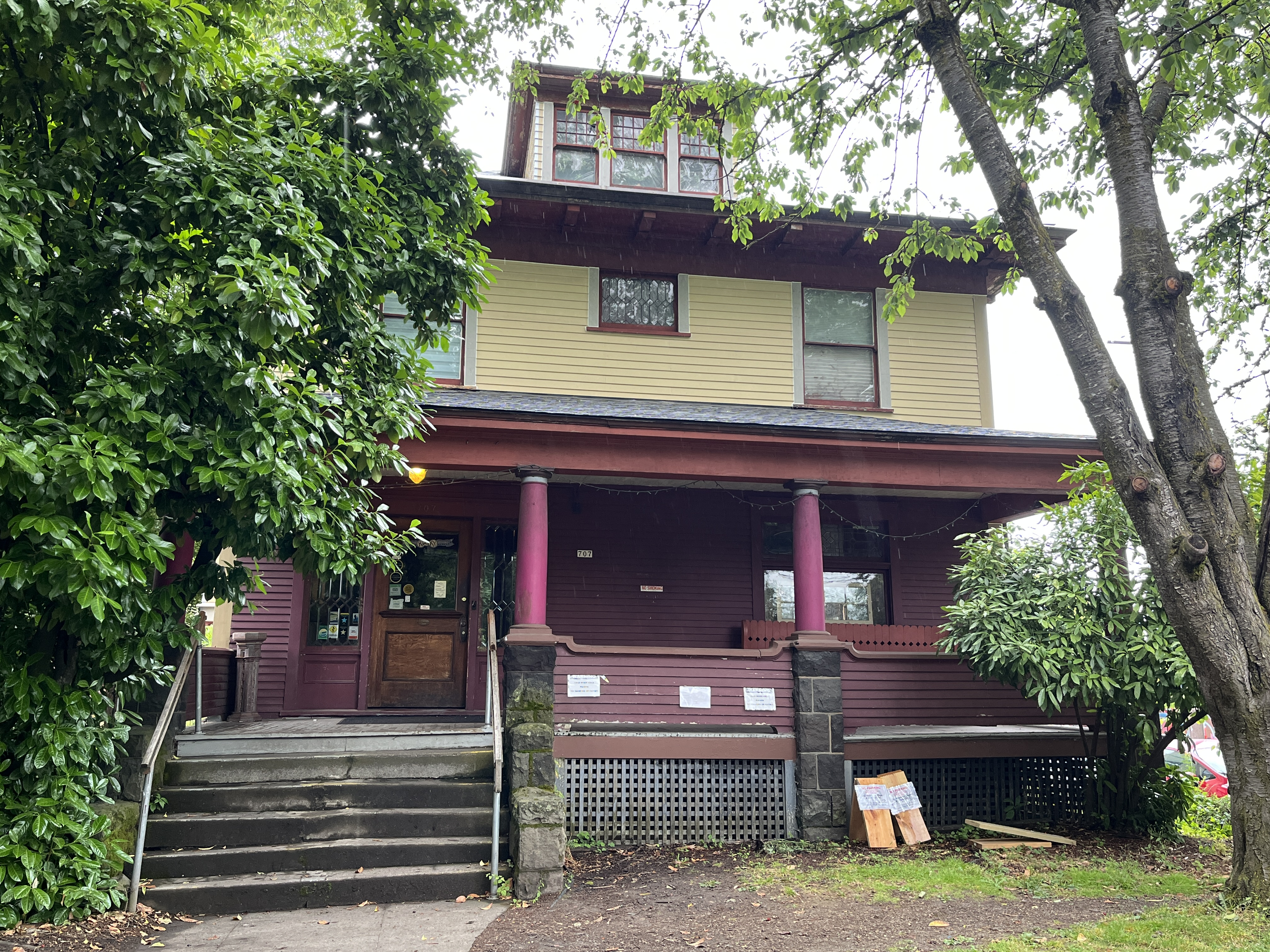
Rimsky-Korsakoffee House

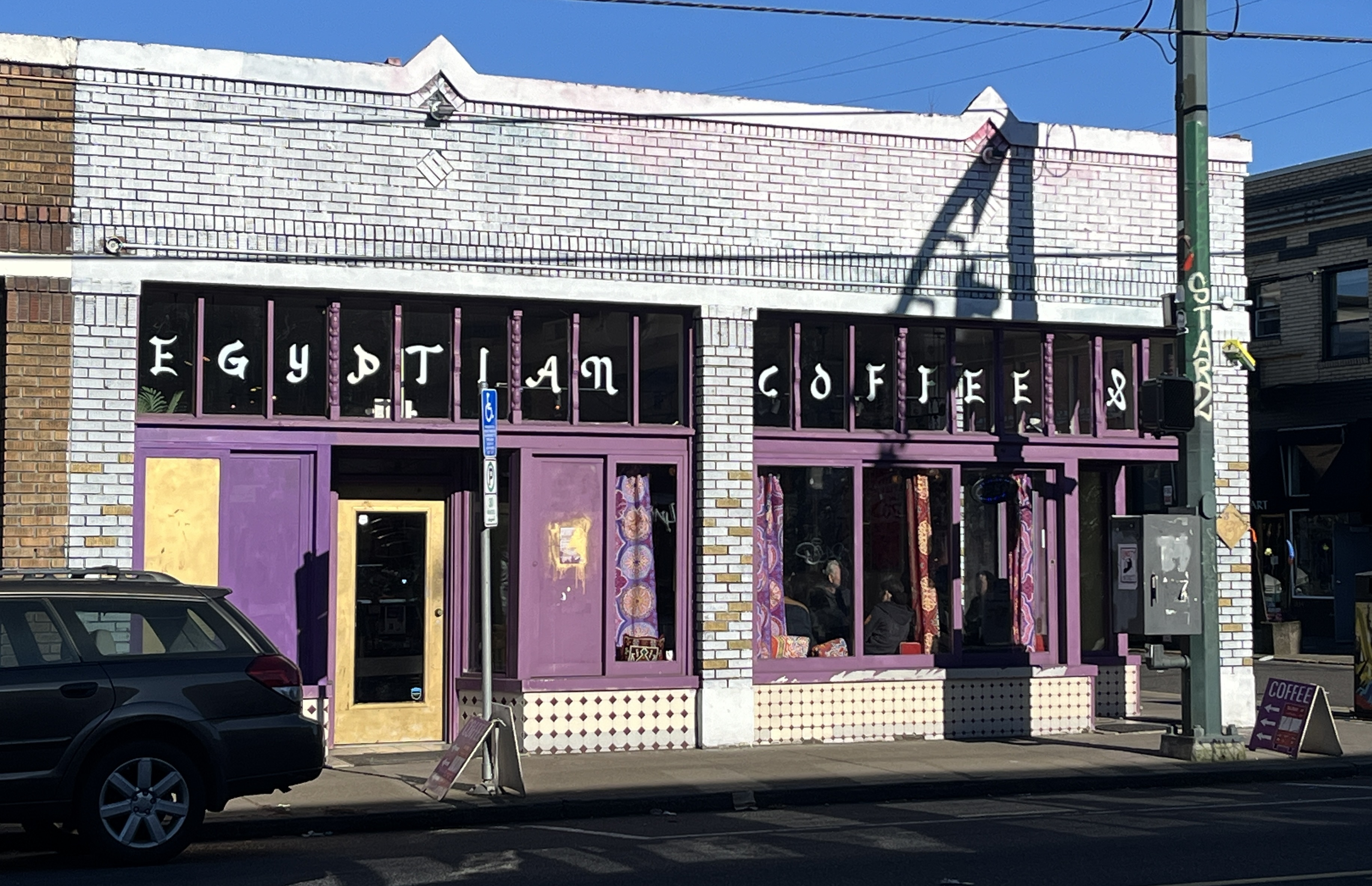
Tōv Coffee

Coffeehouses include Albina Press, Barista, Bipartisan Cafe, Botanical Bakeshop, Coffee Beer, Coffee Time, Either/Or, The Fresh Pot, Heretic Coffee Co., Jet Black, Keeper Coffee, Memento Mori Cafe, Portland Coffee Roasters, Prince Coffee, Push x Pull, Rimsky-Korsakoffee House, Rose City Coffee Co., Spella Caffè, Tōv Coffee, and Wonderwood. Defunct establishments include Jim & Patty's Coffee, Oui Presse, Public Domain Coffee, and Southeast Grind (2009–2019).

Some of Portland's roasters include Case Study, Coava, Deadstock, Heart, Never, Nossa Familia, Roseline, Stumptown, and Water Avenue. Cathedral Coffee was established in north Portland's Cathedral Park neighborhood. Good Coffee has multiple locations in the metropolitan area, including at Portland International Airport.

In 2020, former Boston Red Sox player Kevin Youkilis opened his Loma Coffee Company roastery. Their Ethiopian coffee has been awarded the Good Food Award.

== Events ==
In 2012, the Specialty Coffee Association of America hosted its annual convention, billed as "the largest coffee industry gathering in the world", at the Oregon Convention Center (OCC). Coffee Fest has also been held at the OCC.

== See also ==
- Caffè Umbria
- Coffee in Seattle
- Culture of Portland, Oregon
