= Shoofly Vegan Bakery =

Cafe in Portland, Oregon, U.S.

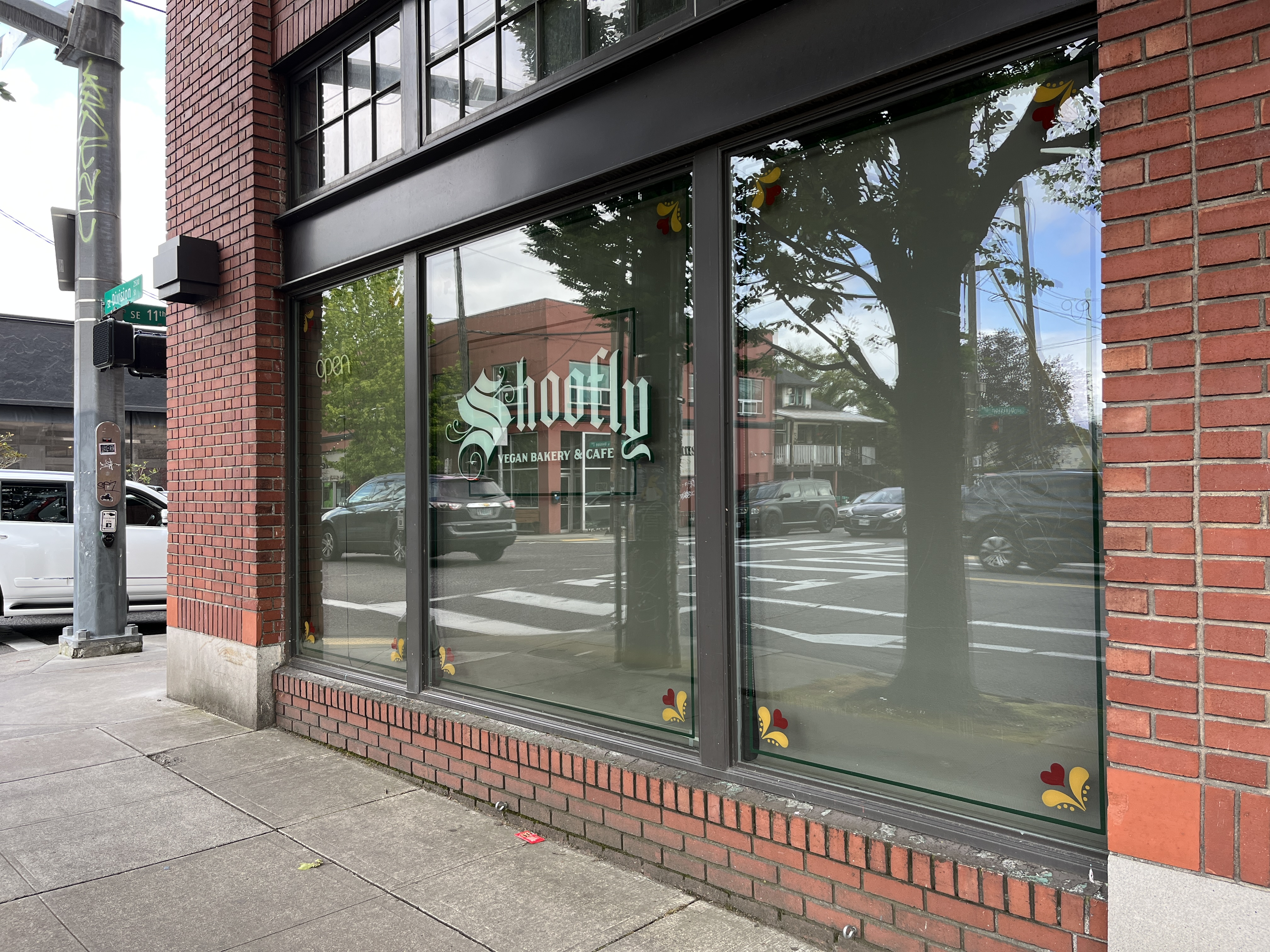
- The bakery's exterior in 2025
- Interactive map of Shoofly Vegan Bakery

Restaurant information
- Owner: Shannon Levens
- Location: 2505 Southeast 11th Avenue #101, Portland, Multnomah, Oregon, 97202, United States
- Coordinates: 45.5048°N 122.6549°W

Shoofly Vegan Bakery was a cafe in Portland, Oregon, United States. Established in 2016, it was among the city's most popular wholesale bakers and supplied vegan baked goods to Caffe Umbria, Case Study Coffee Roasters, and Stumptown Coffee Roasters, among other businesses. The 11th Avenue location in southeast Portland's Hosford-Abernethy neighborhood opened in 2021.

== Description ==
The vegan bakery and cafe operated in the Ford Building at the intersection of 11th Avenue and Division Street in southeast Portland's Hosford-Abernethy neighborhood, near Ladd's Addition. Shoofly Vegan Bakery served cinnamon rolls, cookies, cupcakes, muffins, pecan sticky buns, and savory and sweet hand pies, including a cheesecake variety. Cupcake varieties included chocolate peanut butter, s'mores, and vanilla raspberry. The brunch menu included biscuits and gravy and egg sandwiches on cornmeal biscuits.

== History ==
The bakery shared a space with the pizzeria Secret Pizza Society.

Shannon Levens was the owner, as of late 2022.

In 2025, under new ownership, employees walked out and expressed a desire to convert the business into a worker cooperative.

== Reception ==
Shoofly was included in a Yelp list of Portland's ten best vegan eateries in 2025.

== See also ==
- List of bakeries
- List of defunct restaurants of the United States
- List of vegetarian and vegan restaurants
