= Spielman Bagels & Coffee =

Restaurant chain in Portland, Oregon, U.S.

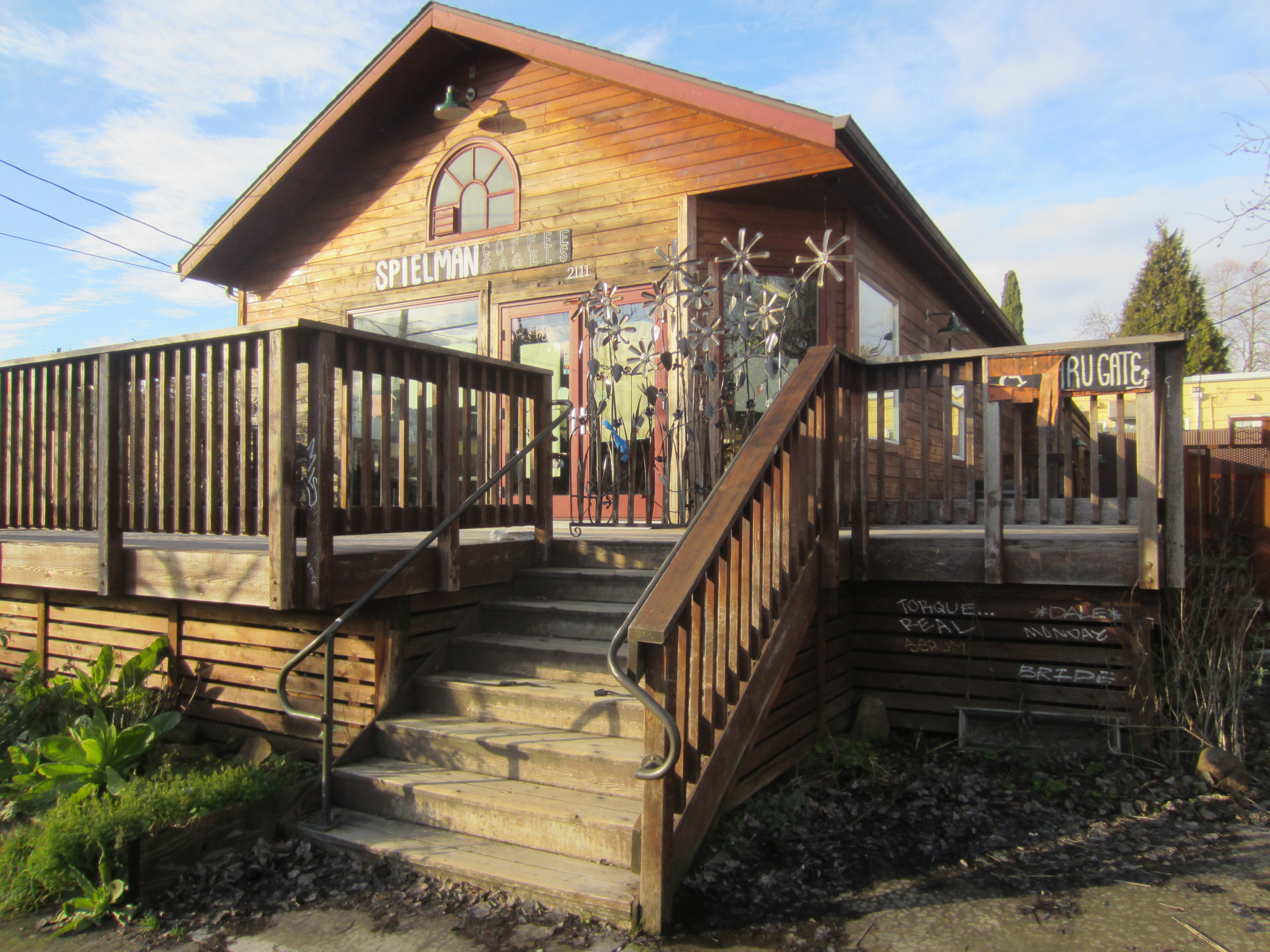
- Exterior of the Southeast Portland location, 2021

Restaurant information
- Established: 2011
- Owners: Rick Spielman; Raf Spielman
- Location: Portland, Multnomah, Oregon, United States
- Website: spielmanbagels.com

Spielman Bagels & Coffee, originally known as Spielman Coffee Roasters, is a small chain of bagel and coffee shops in Portland, Oregon. Established by the father and son duo of Rick and Raf Spielman in 2011, the business operates four locations.

Spielman wholesales to approximately 50 vendors in Portland and Salem, as of 2022, and has garnered a positive reception.

== Description ==
Spielman Bagels & Coffee is a small chain of bagel and coffee shops in Portland, Oregon. Among bagel varieties are jalapeño cheddar, multigrain, pumpernickel, salt and herb, sweet golden raisin and fennel, as well as the Seedy, which has flax, pumpkin, and watermelon seeds. Bagel toppings include avocado, bacon, Mama Lil's Peppers, schmears, sprouts, Tofutti, vegan egg, and whitefish.

According to Eater Portland, Spielman uses a sourdough starter in the dough "to achieve a distinctive West Coast tang, giving the bagels a traditional crisp exterior with a tart-fluffy interior that's complemented by a swipe of cream cheese." The menu also includes babkas, lox, and breakfast sandwiches with ham, egg, and cheese, as well as arugula, bacon, cream cheese, and jam.

The shop on Division Street in Southeast Portland's Hosford-Abernethy neighborhood has a garden and a seating capacity of 44 people (with a patio and porch seating). The business has also sold bagel chips in three varieties: herb and salt, plain, and spicy barbecue.

== History ==
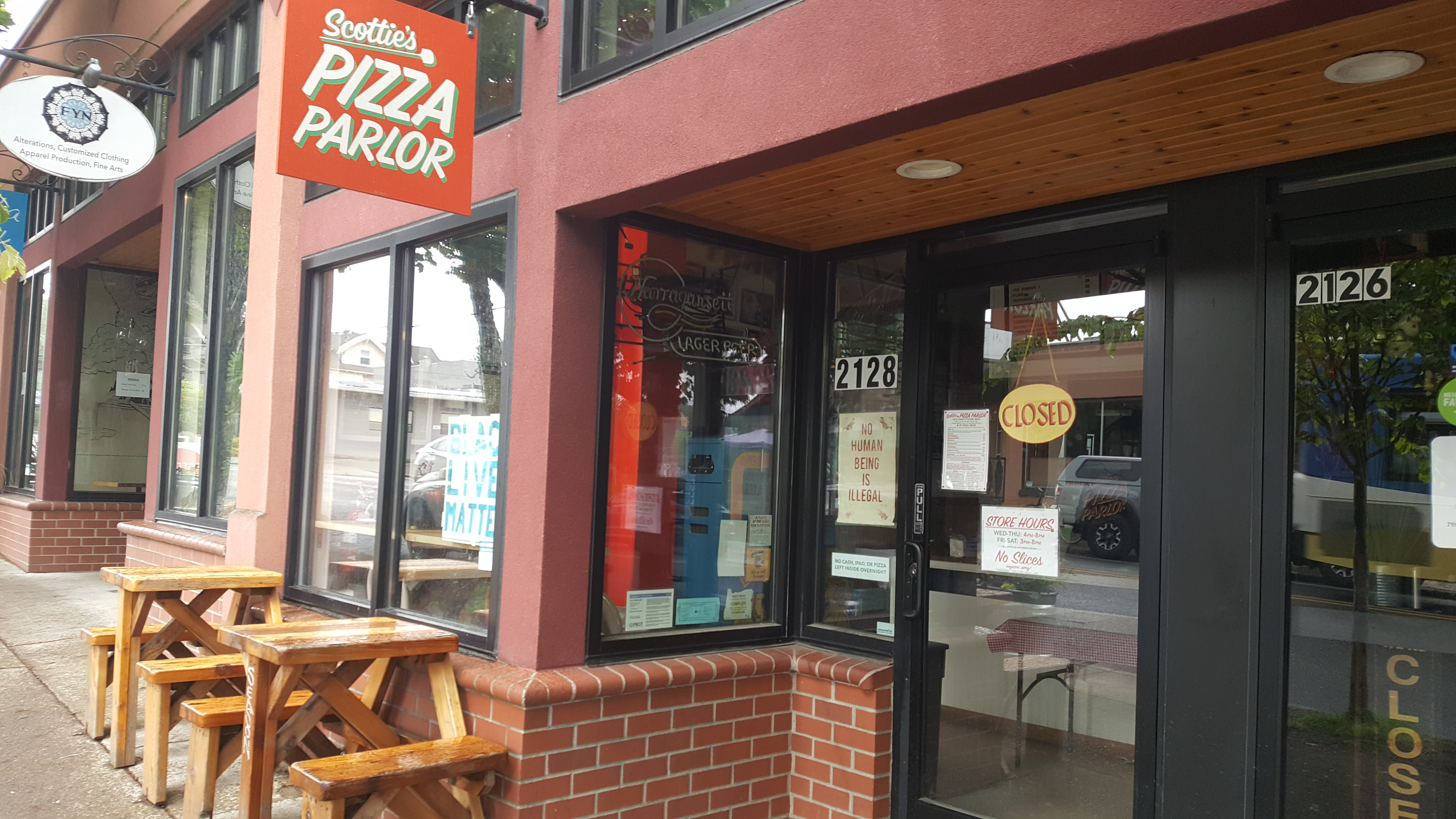
The original shop operated in Southeast Portland's Hosford-Abernethy neighborhood, in the space that later housed Scottie's Pizza Parlor (pictured in 2022).

Co-founders Rick Spielman and his son Raf Spielman opened the first shop (originally known as Spielman Coffee Roasters) on Division Street, in the space later occupied by Scottie's Pizza Parlor, in 2011. In 2013, the business operated a 1,700-square-foot facility that made approximately 2,500 bagels per day. In 2015, Spielman announced plans to open a second shop at the intersection of Broadway and 22nd Avenue in Northeast Portland's Sullivan's Gulch neighborhood. The company also confirmed plans to relocate the Southeast Portland location to a larger space across the street.

In December 2015, Spielman announced plans to open a third shop on Lovejoy Street, near the intersection of 23rd Avenue in Northwest Portland's Northwest District, in early 2016. Owners hoped to open the Southeast Portland shop in conjunction with the third location, and closed the food cart that operated at 10th Avenue and Alder Street in downtown Portland. The Southeast Portland shop opened in mid 2016. Rick Spielman died in 2022.

Among vendors the business has supplied is Stumptown Coffee Roasters. Spielman has participated in Too Good To Go, an app that connects customers to restaurants and stores with surplus unsold food.

== Reception ==
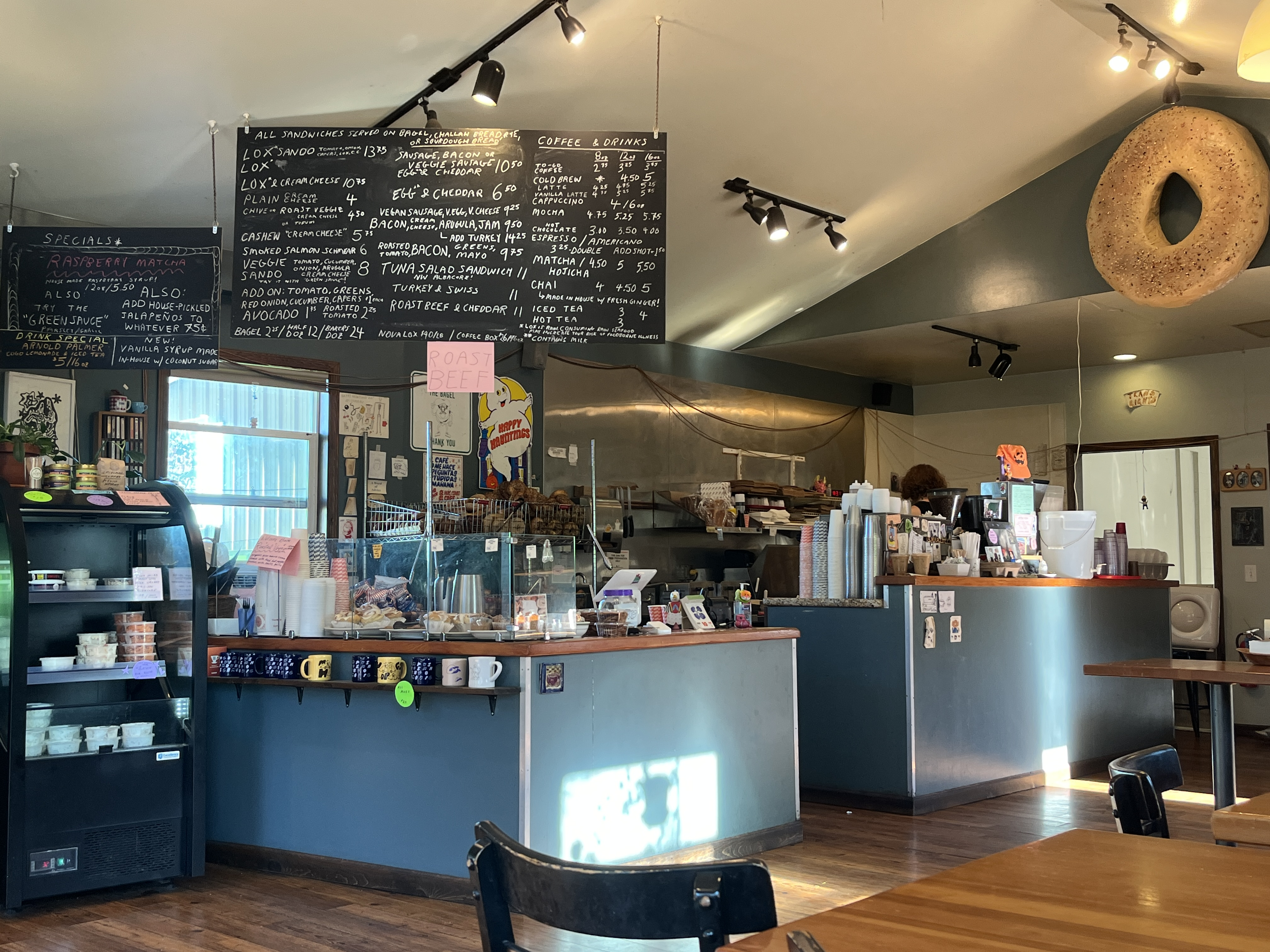
Interior of the Southeast Portland shop, 2025

Portland Monthly has called Spielman "an indispensable breakfast player". The magazine's Benjamin Tepler included the business in a 2012 overview of the city's best bagels. Drew Tyson included the bagel chips in Thrillist's 2015 overview of Portland's fifteen "most important" snacks.

In 2015, Sunset magazine said:

Crackly-crusted sourdough bagels are sweetened with a little honey. Does that make them New York style? Montreal style? Nope. These bagels are all Portland style. The Seedy lives up to its name.

Spielman won in the Best Bagel category of Willamette Week's annual readers' poll in 2017, 2018, and 2020. The business ranked second in the same category in 2015 and 2022. Janey Wong included Spielman in Eater Portland's 2023 overview of recommended restaurants in Southwest Portland's Multnomah neighborhood. In the website's 2024 list of ten "real-deal" bagel shops in the city, Daniel Barnett, Brooke Jackson-Glidden, and Nathan Williams said the salt and herb variety "has proven to be a customer favorite."

== See also ==
- Coffee in Portland, Oregon
- List of bakeries
- List of restaurant chains in the United States
