= Jim & Patty's Coffee =

Restaurant chain in the U.S. state of Oregon

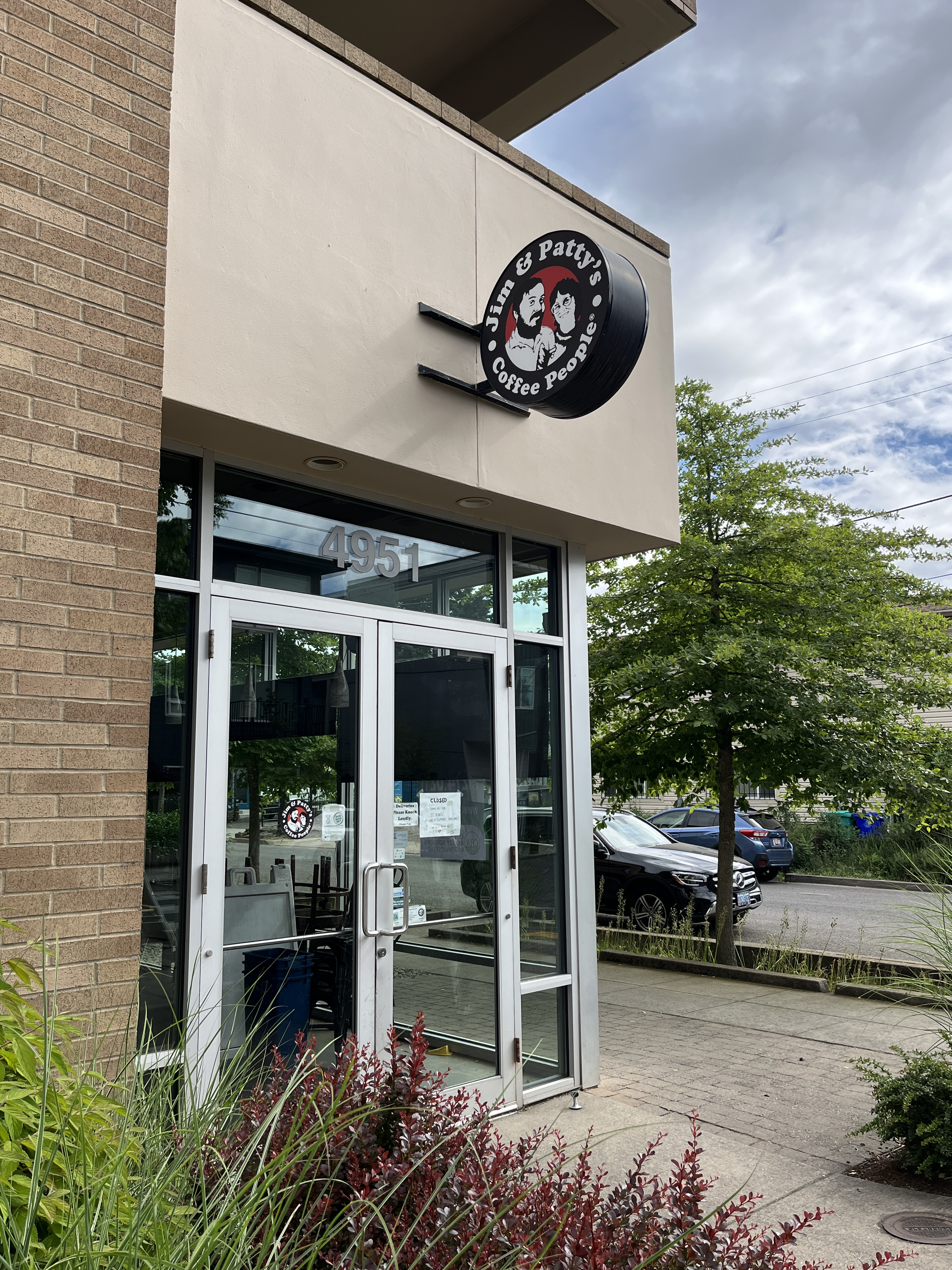
- Exterior of the location in northeast Portland, 2025
- Interactive map of Jim & Patty's Coffee

Restaurant information
- Owners: Jim and Patty Roberts
- Location: Oregon, United States
- Coordinates: 45.5484°N 122.6114°W

Jim & Patty's Coffee is a regional coffee business that has operated multiple shops in the United States. Established in Portland, Oregon, the business has also operated in Beaverton and Happy Valley. The chain closed in November 2024, operating for 22 years, but later re-opened in August 2025 under new ownership.

The business has used the tagline "Good coffee. No backtalk."

== History ==
Jim and Patty Roberts opened the first restaurant on Fremont Street in northeast Portland's Cully neighborhood on November 11, 2002. A second location opened in Beaverton in June 2013.

Jim Roberts died in 2023. The business launched a fundraising campaign to continue operating in 2024. The Happy Valley location closed in May 2024. The Fremont location closed in November 2024, before re-opening under new ownership in August 2025.

The coffee shop closed again in July 2026, though Jim & Patty's will still be available at Spielman Bagels & Coffee.

== See also ==
- List of restaurant chains in the United States
