= Jet Black Coffee Company =

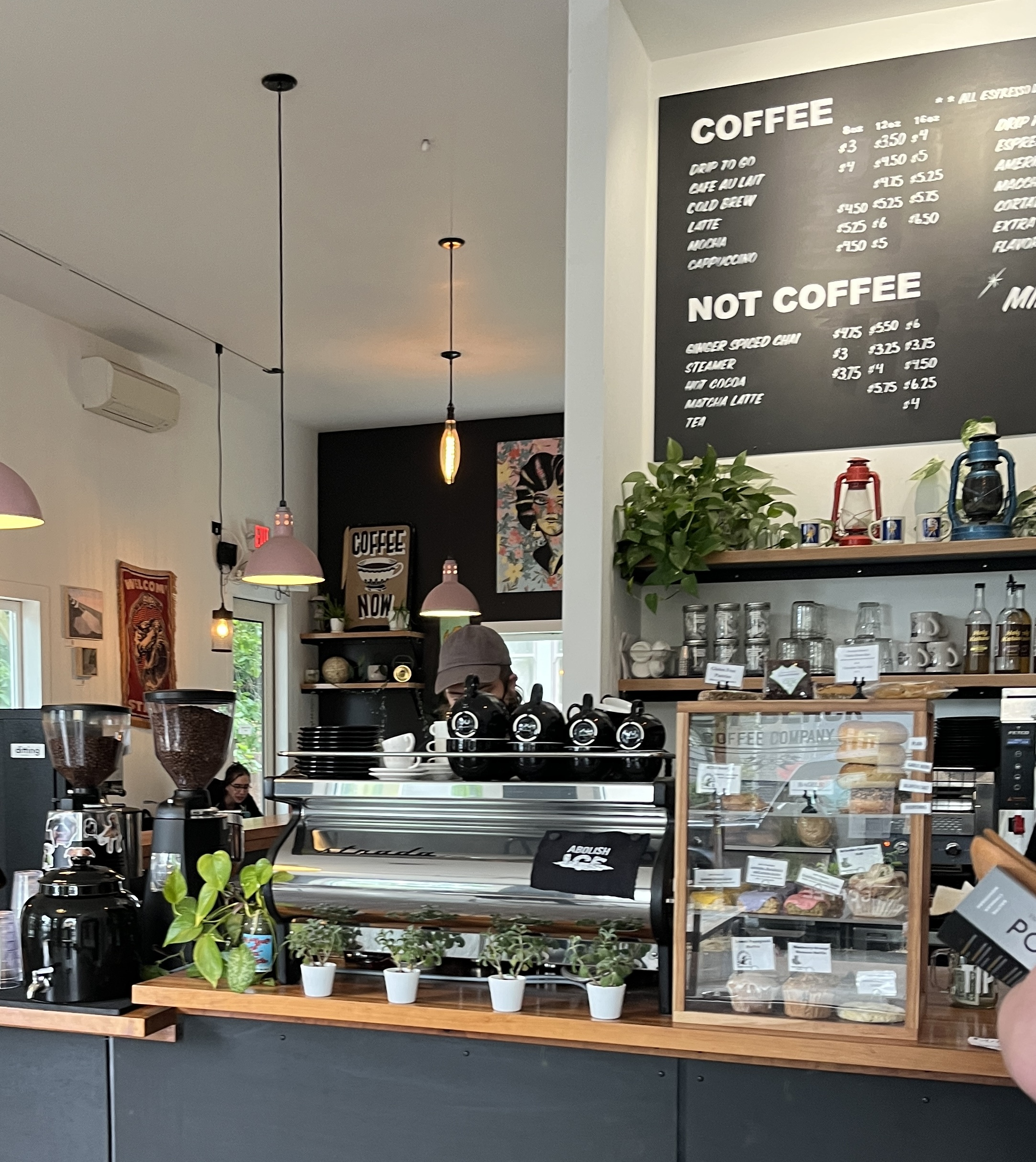
- Interior of a shop in Concordia, Portland, Oregon, 2026

Restaurant information
- Owners: Travis Coe; Karla Nolt
- Location: Portland, Multnomah, Oregon, United States
- Website: jetblackcoffeecompany.com

Jet Black Coffee Company operates vegan cafes in Portland, Oregon, United States.

== Description ==
Jet Black Coffee Company operates vegan cafes in Portland, Oregon. The business is named after the song "Jet Black" by the owners' favorite punk rock band Jawbreaker. Willamette Week has described the Gateway location as "overflowing with unfinished wood, vibrant light and enough potted plants to make Portland Nursery blush."

The restaurant Mis Tacones has operated a food cart outside of Jet Black's Gateway location. The vegan grilled cheese food cart Ditto! has also operated in Jet Black's parking lot.

=== Menu ===
Jet Black serves coffee and espresso drinks such as cappuccinos and lattes with almond-, coconut-, hemp-, and soy milk. According to Thrillist, "Jet Black commissions Water Avenue Coffee to create a custom blend that pairs wonderfully with Oatly or almond milk, and a variety of bubbly beverages". The Dear You Blend is named after Jawbreaker's studio album Dear You (1995), which includes "Jet Black". The Gateway location has stocked pastries by Shoofly Vegan Bakery and bagels by Bowery Bagels. Jet Black shops have also served vegan egg and cheese sandwiches and tea.

== History ==
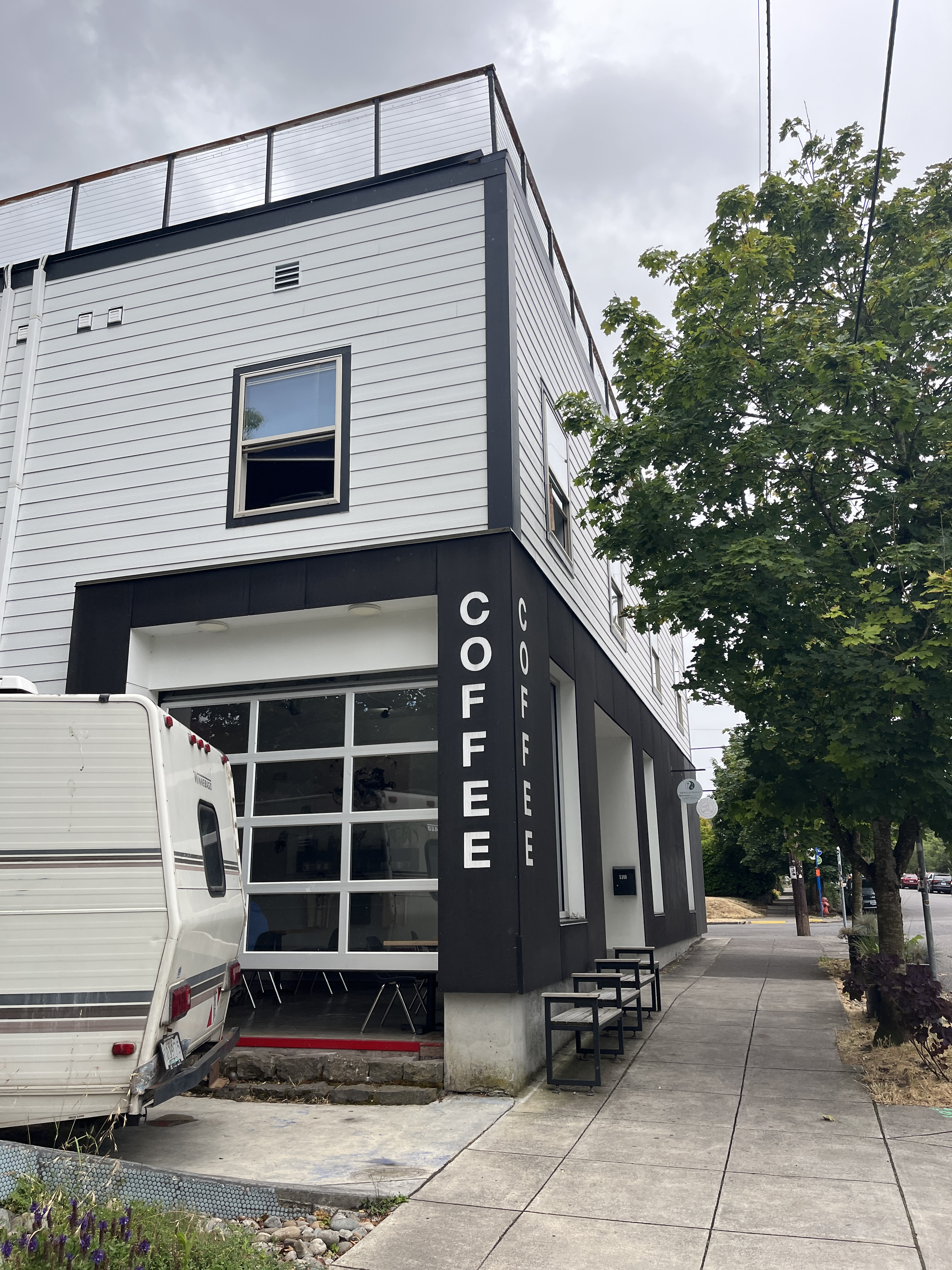
Exterior of the Concordia location, 2026

According to the magazine VegNews, the business was founded by two "music-loving" friends, Travis Coe and Karla Nolt. In 2018, Jet Black and the pop-up restaurant Folklore hosted a fundraiser for ActBlue. Jet Black also hosted a fundraiser for the Veganville Animal Sanctuary. In conjunction with Juneteenth in 2020, Jet Black was among local businesses that donated money to the Black Resilience Fund, which was founded by Cameron Whitten and described by The Oregonian as "an emergency fund that provides immediate resources to Black Portlanders".

== Reception ==
Willamette Week has said, "Jet Black oozes a casual cool you're more likely to find in Austin, Texas, than Gateway." Pete Cottell included Jet Black in Thrillist's 2020 overview of Portland's best coffee shops with Wi-Fi. He said the business was the "best for snacking on vegan food and rocking out to old-school emo music" and described the Gateway location as an "environmentally conscious alternative to the many rinky-dink coffee kiosks that live in the dimly-lit corners of Portland’s final frontier of affordable housing ".

Jet Black ranked third in the Best Vegan Coffee Shop category of VegNews' annual restaurant awards in 2024. The magazine's Tanya Flink included the business in a 2025 list of the seventeen best vegan coffee shops in the nation. She wrote, "Walk into Jet Black Coffee Company, and you're guaranteed to enjoy good food, good coffee, and good music."

== See also ==
- List of vegetarian and vegan restaurants
