= Scottie's Pizza Parlor =

Pizzeria in Portland, Oregon, U.S.

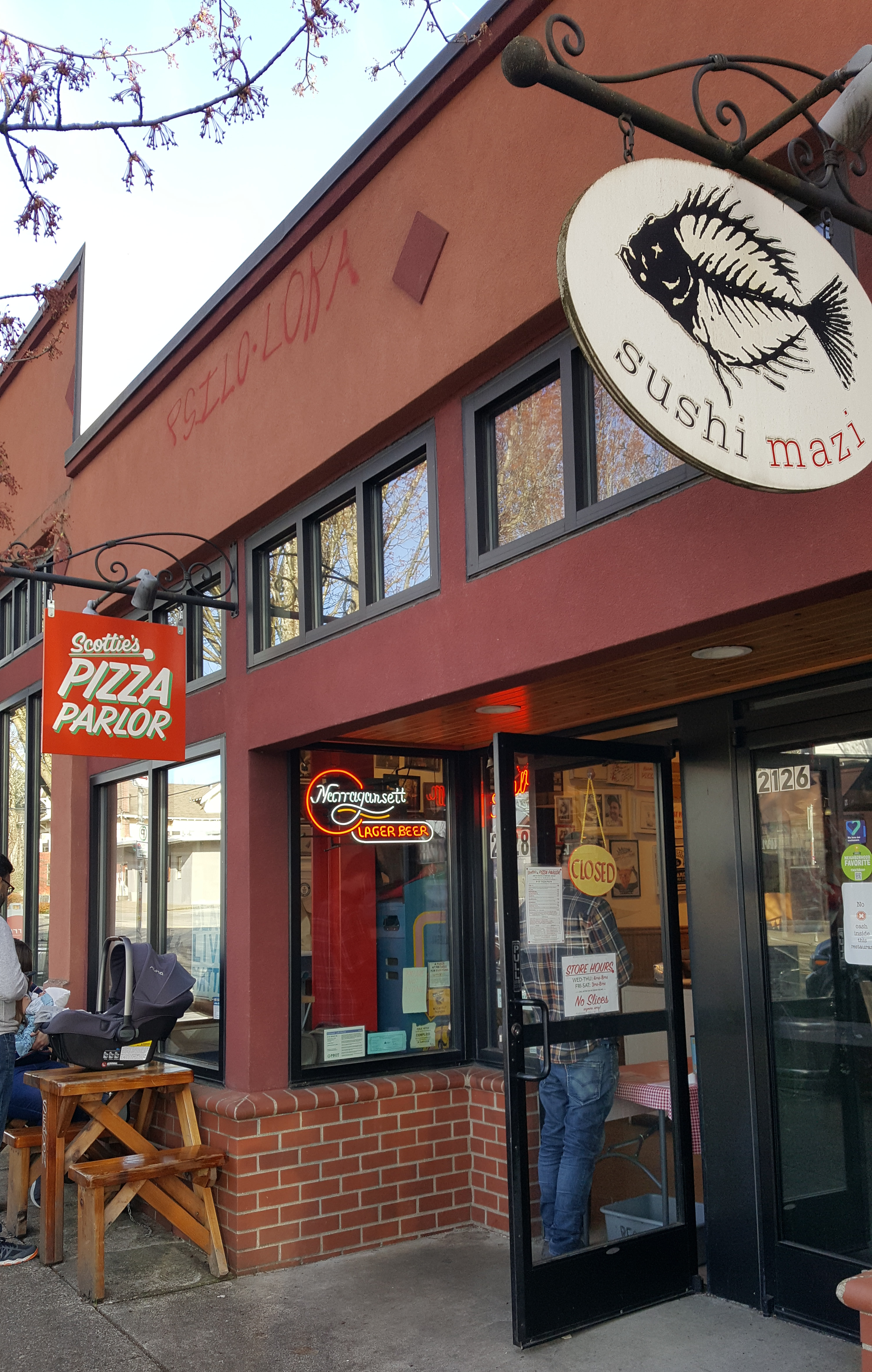
- The original restaurant's exterior in southeast Portland, Oregon, in March 2022
- Interactive map of Scottie's Pizza Parlor

Restaurant information
- Owners: Scott Rivera; Amy Coplen
- Food type: Italian (pizza)
- Location: 2128 Southeast Division Street, Portland, Multnomah, Oregon, 97202, United States
- Coordinates: 45.5047°N 122.6439°W
- Website: scottiespizzaparlor.com

Scottie's Pizza Parlor is a pizzeria with two locations in Portland, Oregon, United States. Scott Rivera and Amy Coplen opened the original location in southeast Portland's Hosford-Abernethy neighborhood in 2015. The second location opened in northwest Portland's Northwest District in late 2022.

== Description ==
Scottie's Pizza Parlor is a pizzeria with two locations; the original restaurant is located on Division Street in southeast Portland's Hosford-Abernethy neighborhood, and a second operates on 21st Avenue in northwest Portland's Northwest District. The business makes 16-inch square and 18-inch round pizzas; varieties include margherita, pepperoni, and bianca (sauceless). Scottie's uses sourdough and has made mozzarella and ricotta in-house. The menu also includes Caesar salads, garlic knots, and cannoli.

In 2015, Portland Monthly's Benjamin Tepler wrote, "You'll find poofy-rimmed, leopard-spotted Neapolitan pies cooked in a 900-degree Swedish electric deck oven but served New York–style, in cheap 18-inch rounds or big, foldable slices." Ben Waterhouse of The Oregonian described Scottie's as a "tiny, Indiegogo-funded spot" serving pizza by the slice or pie. Customers can pick up pizzas to bake at home.

== History ==
Scott Rivera opened the restaurant on July 29, 2015, with his business partner and then-girlfriend Amy Coplen. Previously, he had worked at Bread and Ink Cafe, Ava Gene's, Baby Doll Pizza, and Handsome Pizza. In 2017, Rivera attempted a world record by creating the Centouno Formaggio, a 101-cheese pizza.

In September 2019, 15 employees at Scottie's decided to unionize with the Industrial Workers of the World; Rivera recognized the union. The restaurant's hours were reduced during the COVID-19 pandemic, allowing Rivera to experiment with baking breads and bombolones. He launched the pop-up Bomba PDX in November 2020, selling donuts with cinnamon sugar or various fillings.

The second location opened on December 16, 2022. In December 2023, the outpost hosted Bhuna Tuesdays weekly, offering pork vindaloo pizza with mint chutney drizzle and raita on the side. In July 2026, the business announced plans to relocate the original location.

== Reception ==
Benjamin Tepler of Portland Monthly said in 2015, "The best slice at Scottie's happens to be the simplest: pizza bianca, with melting heaps of creamy, fresh-made ricotta, fried basil leaves, and a dusting of crushed New Mexico chiles, all drizzled with olive oil." In 2018, Anthony Falco named Portland the "greatest pizza city" in the U.S., based on Scottie's, Apizza Scholls, and Lovely's Fifty Fifty. Scottie's ranked number 43 in a 2022 "Top 50 Pizza in USA" list curated by Italian experts. Lindsay D. Mattison ranked the business fourth in Tasting Table's 2023 list of the city's best pizza.

Eater Portland included Scottie's in several lists in 2021, including: Waz Wu's overview of Portland's "knockout" vegan pizzas, Nick Townsend's guide of fifteen restaurants "worth visiting" on Division, Rachel Pinsky's overview of "thick, cheesy square" pizzas in the city, Zoe Baillargeon's list of the metropolitan area's "cheesiest" pizzas, and Brooke Jackson-Glidden's summary of Portland's "exceptional" pizzas. In 2024, Jackson-Glidden and Rebecca Roland included Scottie's in the website's overview of the best pizza in the metropolitan area. Scottie's was included in the website's 2025 lists of the best affordable restaurants and mid-week lunches in Portland. Paolo Bicchieri included the Northwest District location in Eater Portland's 2025 overview of the city's best restaurants for lunch.

Scottie's was a finalist in the Best Pizza category of Willamette Week's annual 'Best of Portland' readers' poll in 2025.

== See also ==
- Pizza in Portland, Oregon
