= Rose City Coffee Co. =

Coffee company based in Portland, Oregon, U.S.

- The shop's exterior, 2026
- Interactive map of Rose City Coffee Co.

Restaurant information
- Owner: Christie Gryphon
- Location: 3370 Southeast Milwaukie Avenue, Portland, Multnomah, Oregon, 97202, United States
- Coordinates: 45.4986°N 122.6538°W
- Website: rosecitycoffeecompany.com

Rose City Coffee Co. (RCC) is a coffee company based in Portland, Oregon, United States. The woman-owned business operates a coffee shop in Southeast Portland's Brooklyn neighborhood. RCC has offered 24-hour service since 2025.

== Description ==
The coffee company Rose City Coffee Co. is based in Portland, Oregon. The woman-owned business operates a coffee shop on Milwaukie Avenue in Southeast Portland's Brooklyn neighborhood. The interior has seating booths with overhead lighting and outlets for electronics. There are many tables, including one large enough to accommodate a group of 12 people. There is also a gift shop with merchandise, paper products, stickers, and other art, as well as areas with books and toys.

Rita A. Leonard of The Bee has said the space as an "easy ambiance". Bennett Campbell Ferguson and Rachel Saslow of Willamette Week have called the shop "sprawling" and "cavernous", respectively. The shop has collaborated with a local plant shop to display plants and other products such as crystals, planters and pots, and terrariums.

=== Menu ===
In addition to serving coffee drinks and selling whole beans, the cafe offers sandwiches for breakfast and lunch, as well as flatbreads and non-alcoholic drinks during evenings. The apple latte has caramel. The amber latte has Whimsy Chocolates-brand caramel and the purple haze latte has blackberry, lavender, and white chocolate. RCC also serves tea.

== History ==
The shop's interior in 2026

RCC moved into the space that previously housed Schondecken Coffee Rosters, which was owned by Nancy Duncan. In 2013, Willamette Week said of RCC's origins, "Earlier this year, owners Steven Morrison and Joe Provencher became the adopted sons of Schondecken, one of Portland's oldest micro-roasters, taking over both the 90-year-old Westmoreland home that's housed the business since the late '80s and its Corvallis-built air roaster." RCC relocated one year later.

Christie Gryphon has been the owner since March 2016. According to The Bee, RCC was among Oregon's few women-owned coffee roasters and cafes.

Like many restaurants, the business's operations were disrupted by the COVID-19 pandemic. In January 2021, the shop was vandalized for a fourth time in less than two years. The coffee shop extended its hours of operation in 2024. In October 2025, RCC announced plans to begin 24-hour service, effective November 11.

=== Activities ===
RCC was a vendor at Brooklyn Park Pub's annual art and crafts bazaar in 2017. In 2018, RCC sponsored the neighborhood's fifth annual Easter egg hunt at Brooklyn Park. RCC also hosted a concert to benefit Friends of Brooklyn Park, which offers a summer youth program at the park. In 2020, RCC supported the group's gala to help fund the program. The shop also hosted an "art showcase" highlighting works by local artists.

In 2022, an LED display was installed at RCC in conjunction with the Portland Winter Light Festival. RCC hosted speed dating events regularly, as of 2023. The shop has also hosted live music and blood donation events. In 2025, RCC sponsored the 'Best of Brooklyn BBQ', a fair of Brooklyn's businesses with food and live music. RCC sponsored the event again in 2026.
