= The Fresh Pot =

Coffee shop in Portland, Oregon, U.S.

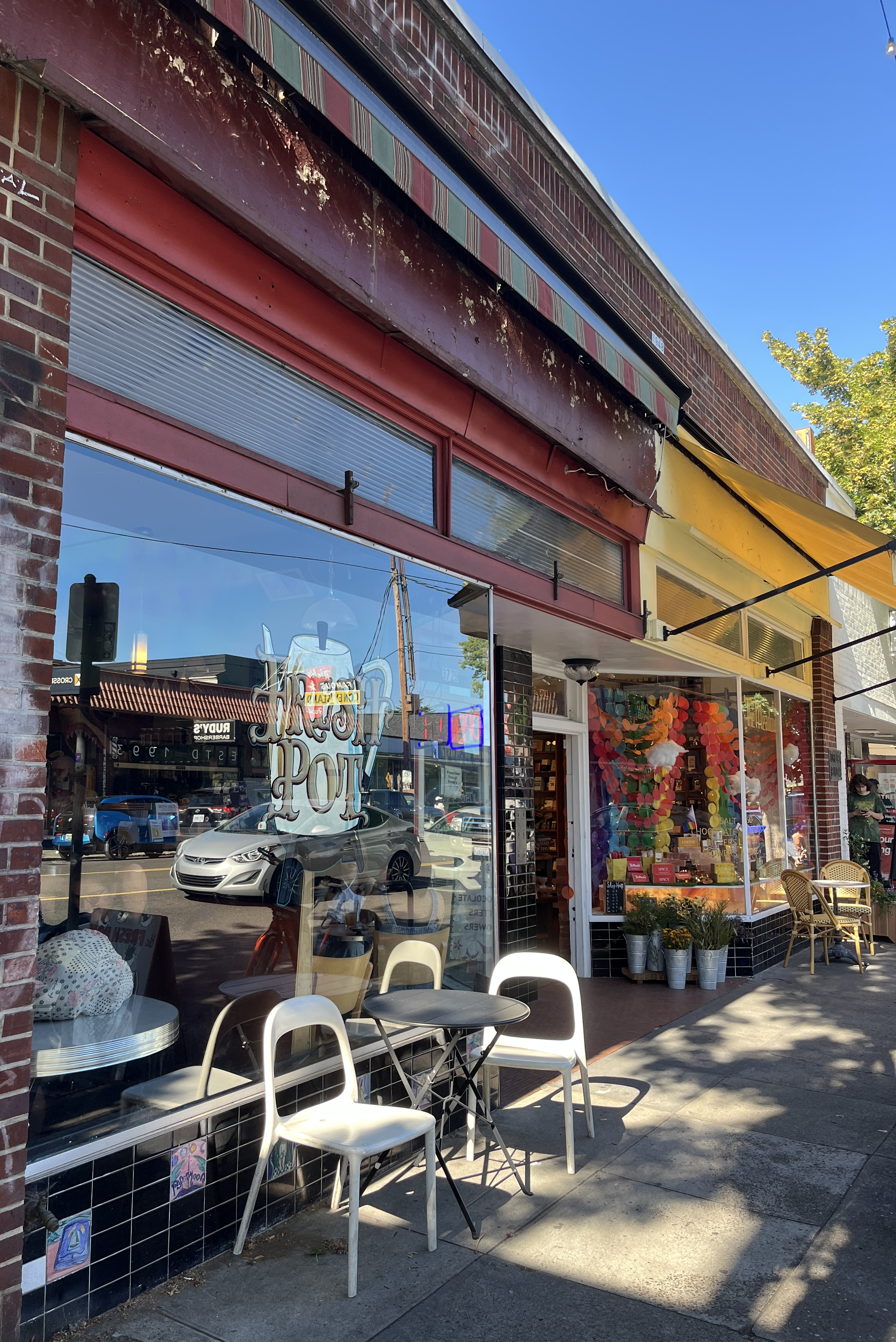
- Exterior of a shop in southeast Portland, Oregon, in 2025
- Interactive map of The Fresh Pot

Restaurant information
- Coordinates: 45.5522°N 122.6757°W
- Website: thefreshpot.com

The Fresh Pot is a chain of coffee shops with two locations in Portland, Oregon, United States.

== Description ==
The Fresh Pot operates two coffee shops in Portland, Oregon. The original location is on Hawthorne Boulevard in southeast Portland's Sunnyside neighborhood and another operates on Mississippi Avenue in the north Portland part of the Boise neighborhood. The Hawthorne location is attached to a Powell's Books shop. In addition to coffee drinks, The Fresh Pot serves matcha drinks.

== History ==
The Fresh Pot was established in 1997 and was among the first wholesalers of Stumptown Coffee Roasters. Matthew Vinci is a co-owner.

The Mississippi Avenue location, which operates in remolded former drug store and soda fountain at the intersection with North Shaver Street, opened in 2002. The interior has original bar stools.

The location in southeast Portland has operated in the Hawthorne location of Powell's Books.

In late 2010, Vinci announced plans to open a third location in the Morgan Building in downtown Portland.

In 2009, The Fresh Pot's Alex Pond won the Northwest Regional Barista Competition. Bethany Hargrove represented The Fresh Pot at the 2014 U.S. Coffee Championships.

The Mississippi Avenue location appeared in the 2007 film Feast of Love. Vinci was featured on the YouTube series about coffee called Coffee Breath in 2023.

== Reception ==
The Fresh Pot was included in Eater Portland's 2013 list of the city's 20 best coffee shops and roasters.

== See also ==
- List of coffeehouse chains
