= Heretic Coffee Co. =

Coffee shop in Portland, Oregon, U.S.

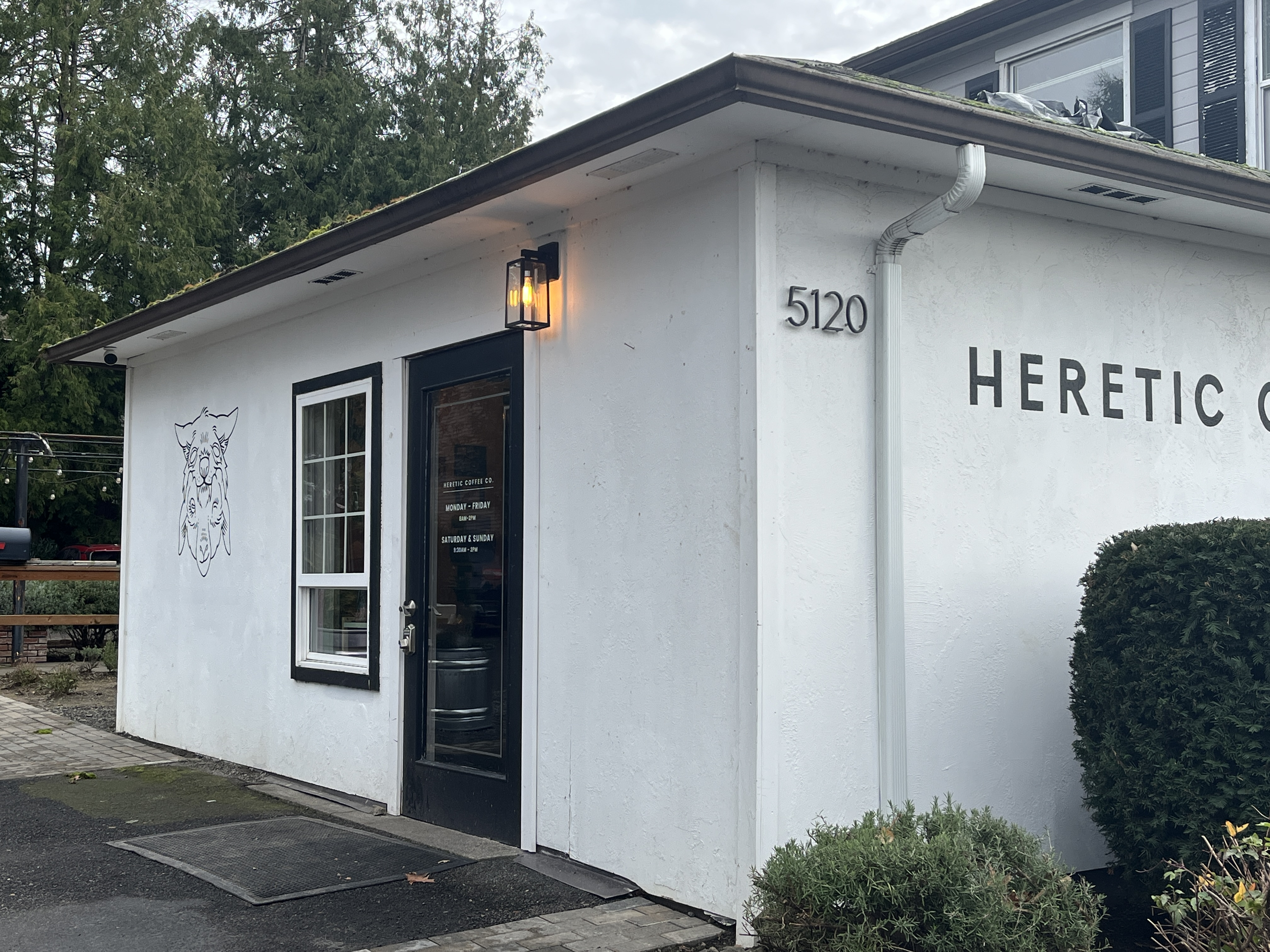
- The coffee shop's exterior in 2026
- Interactive map of Heretic Coffee Co.

Restaurant information
- Established: 2024
- Owner: Josh White
- Location: 5120 Southeast 28th Avenue, Portland, Multnomah, Oregon, 97202, United States
- Coordinates: 45.4857°N 122.6372°W
- Website: hereticcoffee.com

Heretic Coffee Co. is a coffee shop in Portland, Oregon, United States. It is a nonprofit organization run by volunteers.

== Description ==
The coffee shop Heretic Coffee Co. operates on 28th Avenue in southeast Portland's Reed neighborhood. Run by volunteers, Heretic is a nonprofit organization that trains baristas and coffee roasters.

== History ==
Heretic Coffee opened in 2024. Josh White owns the business. He wanted Heretic to be community-oriented.

In 2025, Heretic raised approximately $300,000 to serve breakfast to people who lost Supplemental Nutrition Assistance Program (SNAP) benefits during the U.S. federal government shutdown, effective November 1. The "SNAP breakfasts" include a breakfast burrito and a cup of coffee. More than 2,000 people donated to the fundraiser, some as far away as Norway. White has said the offer will last until benefits are restored or until the business "go[es] broke". By mid November, Heretic had raised $360,000 and provided 1,200 SNAP breakfasts. The business announced plans to continue providing SNAP breakfasts indefinitely, despite the end of the government shutdown.

Someone kicked and shattered the glass door in 2026. The business launched a fundraiser, which generated more than $10,000. In September 2026, Heretic announced plans to build a café in Gaza called The Department of Peace. Heretic planned to fundraise $100,000 and partner with Humanite Peace Collective on the project. After raising approximately $40,000, the effort was cancelled following community pushback.

== Reception ==
Emily Hunt ranked Heretic's Valle del Cauca Decaf blend third in Tasting Table's 2024 review of thirteen decaffeinated whole bean coffees. In 2026, Reader's Digest included Heretic in its annual list of the "nicest places in America".
