= Albina Press =

Chain of coffee shops based in Portland, Oregon, U.S.

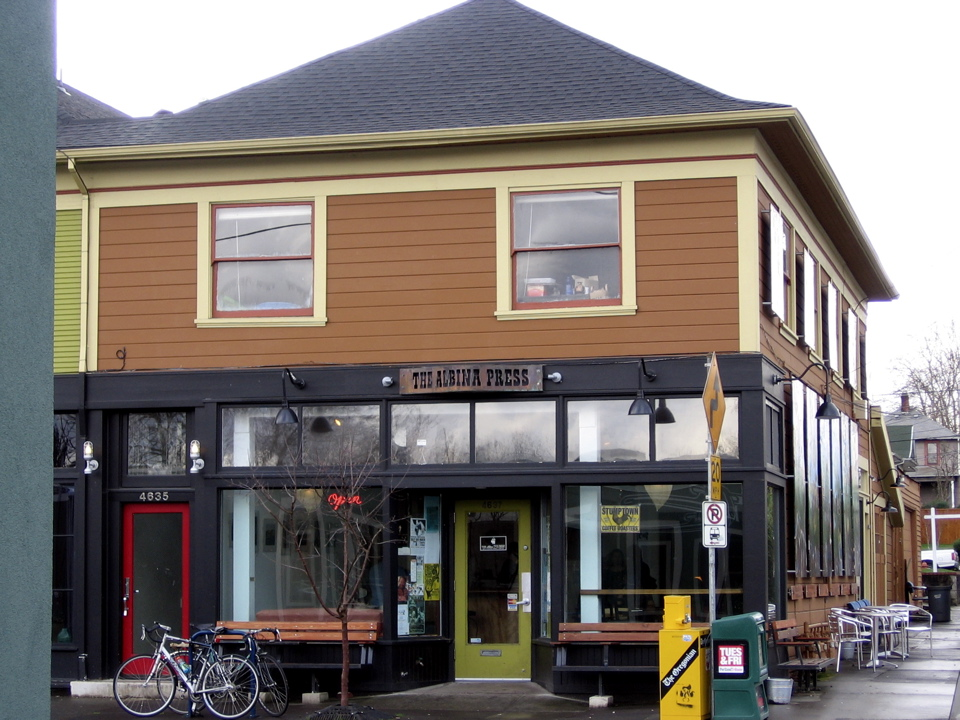
- Exterior of an Albina Press coffee shop in 2010

Restaurant information
- Location: United States

Albina Press is a small chain of coffee shops in the Portland metropolitan area, in the United States. The business has operated in north Portland, southeast Portland, and Vancouver, Washington.

== Description ==
The coffee shop chain Albina Press operates in the Portland metropolitan area; there have been locations on Albina Street in north Portland, on Hawthorne Boulevard in southeast Portland, and in Vancouver, Washington. The interior of the north Portland location has couches. Albina Press uses coffee beans from Stumptown Coffee Roasters.

== History ==
The business was owned by Kevin Fuller, who opened the original location in north Portland in 2004, followed by subsequent locations in southeast Portland and Vancouver in 2008 and 2018, respectively. Billy Wilson has also been a co-owner.

== Reception ==
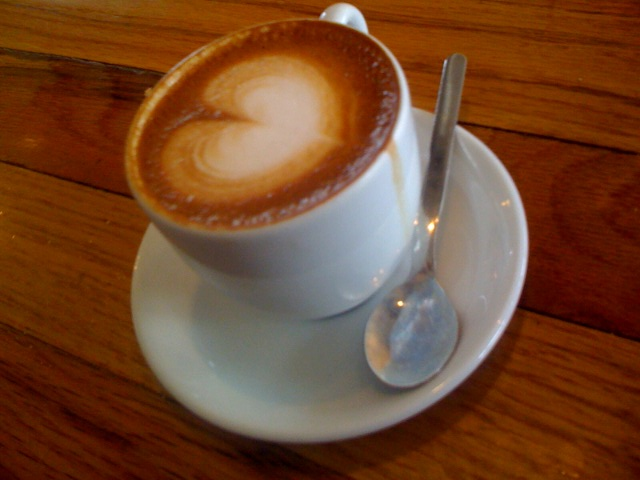
Macchiato at Albina Press

Rachel Dresbeck's Insiders' Guide to Portland Oregon says Albina Press is "an irresistible cafe for writing, reading, or just chatting for an hour or two or six". Peter Meehan of The New York Times called Albina Press "celebrated" in 2006. Willamette Week included the business in a list of Portland's best coffee establishments in 2008. Hannah Wallace included the business in Condé Nast Traveler's 2018 ilst of Portland's best coffee shops.

Kelly Clarke included Albina Press in Portland Monthly's 2017 list of recommended eateries in the North Mississippi/Williams area. Clarke and other writers also included the business in a 2017 list of nine "neighborhood coffee shops we love". Karen Brooks and other writers included Albina Press in the magazine's 2023 "definitive guide" of the city's independent coffee shops and called the business "a leader in Portland's third-wave coffee scene". Meira Gebel included the business in Axios Portland's 2023 list of the city's best coffee shops on "work-from-home" days. Gebel wrote, "If Friends had been filmed in Portland, this is surely where the gang would hang out. With comfy couches, it's much more homey than hip — and that's the appeal." Paolo Bicchieri included Albina Press in Eater Portland's 2025 overview of the city's best coffee shops. Bicchieri also included the business in a list of the best cafes with Wi-Fi for remote working. The Portland Mercury has said Albina Press has a "gorgeous atmosphere and they always have some hot local artist showing off their work on the walls".

Albina Press ranked second in the U.S. Barista Championship in 2005 and the Northwest Regional Barista Competition in 2009.
