= Push x Pull =

Coffee company in the United States

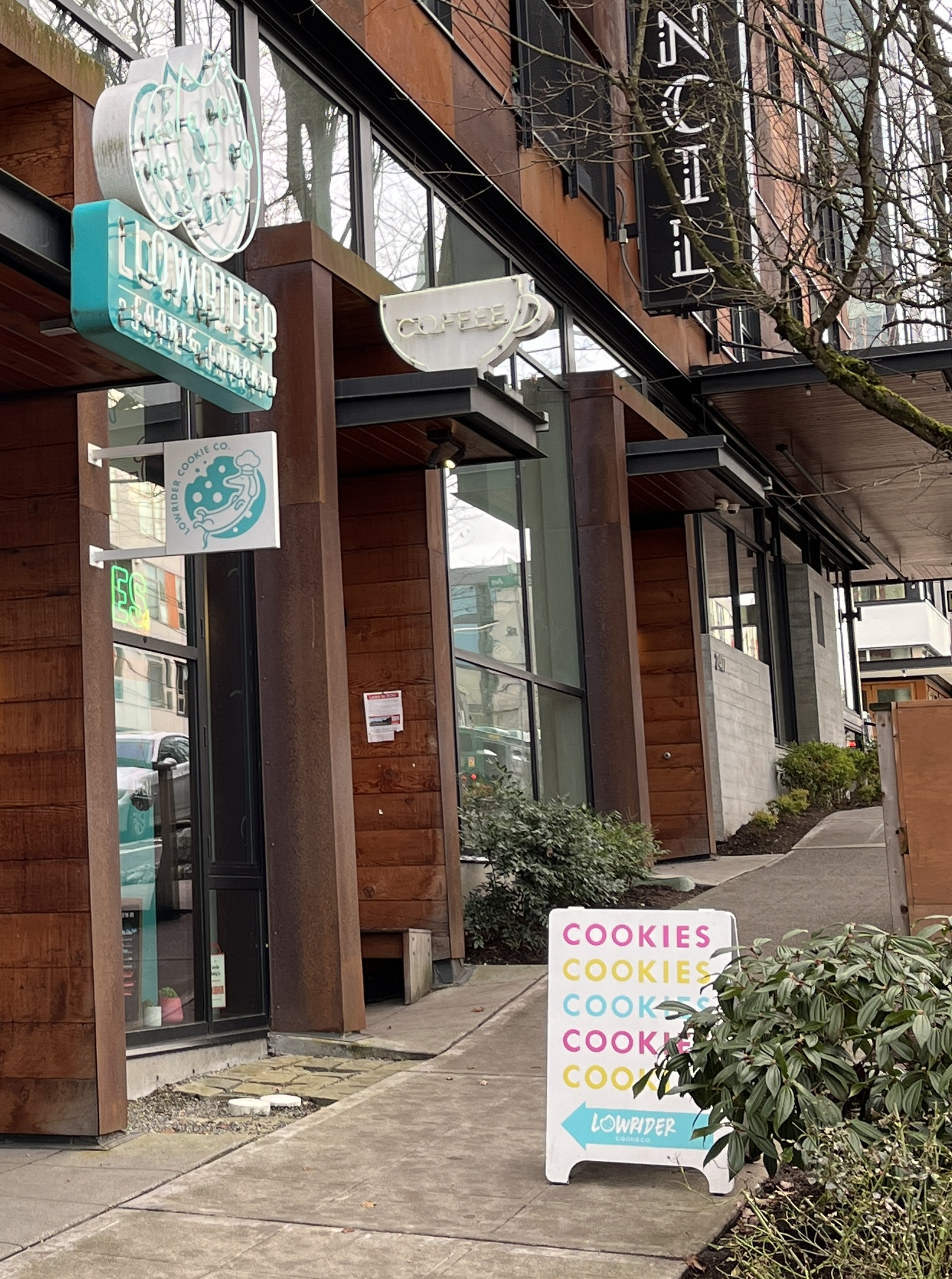
- Exterior of the shop in Seattle's Central District in 2023

Restaurant information
- Location: United States
- Website: pushxpullcoffee.com

Push x Pull is a coffee company based in Portland, Oregon, United States. The business has also operated in Seattle's Central District.

== Description ==
The coffee company Push x Pull is based in Portland, Oregon, and has operated in Seattle's Central District. The business specializes in natural-process coffees and serves many different varieties, including some from Guatemala, Indonesia, and Uganda. Drink includes espresso shots and cortados. Food options include an egg and cheese sandwich, as well as baked goods.

Aimee Rizzo of The Infatuation has said of the Seattle location: "The design is minimal, the entire menu fits on a little black felt board, and the inside looks like your Amazonian friend's open one-bedroom: white walls, giant windows, and a ton of succulents. There's wifi, and the upstairs balcony bar is the perfect spot to post up with a mug of chai and a slice of creme fraiche coffee cake distraction-free (unless you like staring at blank walls). Bonus points for music that's not too loud and actually-nice baristas."

== History ==
The business was established in 2018. Christopher Hall and Emma Mansanti are the owners.

== Reception ==
In the Daily Hive's 2021 list of eight coffee shops in Portland "that'll have you ditching big chains immediately", Lakshmi Sadhu said Push x Pull has "one of the best" espressos in the city. Lindsay D. Mattison ranked Push x Pull eleventh in Tasting Table's 2023 list of Portland's fifteen best coffee shops. Eater Portland included Push x Pull in a 2024 list of the city's best coffee shops.

== See also ==
- List of coffeehouse chains
- List of restaurant chains in the United States
