= Rimsky-Korsakoffee House =

Coffeehouse in Portland, Oregon, U.S.

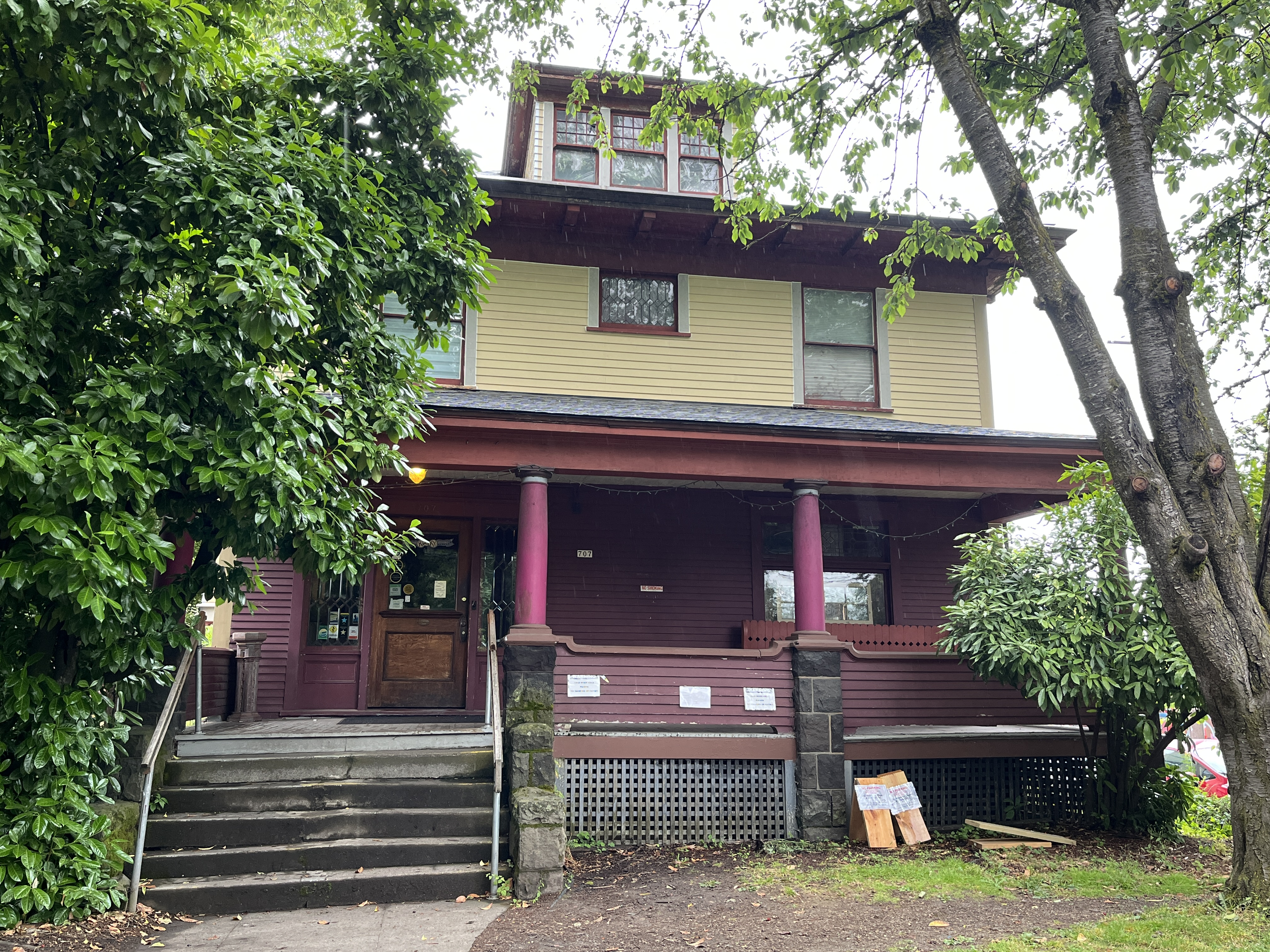
- The coffeehouse's exterior in 2025
- Interactive map of Rimsky-Korsakoffee House

Restaurant information
- Established: 1980
- Owner: Goody Cable
- Food type: Coffee; desserts
- Dress code: Casual
- Location: 707 Southeast 12th Avenue, Portland, Oregon, Multnomah, Oregon, 97214, United States
- Coordinates: 45.51784°N 122.654°W
- Reservations: No

Rimsky-Korsakoffee House, located in the Buckman neighborhood of southeast Portland, Oregon, in the United States, is one of the city's oldest coffeehouses. Named after Russian composer Nikolai Rimsky-Korsakov, the classical music-themed coffeehouse serves coffee and desserts, operating from the former living room of a reportedly haunted 1902 Craftsman-style house. Goody Cable started the business in 1980, having hosted classical music events in her home for years prior.

Rimsky-Korsakoffee has a casual, communal atmosphere and sometimes features live classical music. The house is decorated with knickknacks, art and hanging objects. Tables are named for various composers; some of them are "haunted" (animated), at times elevating, rotating or vibrating. The coffeehouse has received a generally positive reception and is known mostly for its desserts and for offering a unique experience to guests. Rimsky-Korsakoffee has been called "eclectic", "quirky" and "spooky", and has been recognized by several publications for its coffee and desserts.

== Description ==
Named after Russian composer Nikolai Rimsky-Korsakov, Rimsky-Korsakoffee was one of Portland's first coffeehouses. The classical music-themed business, located in Portland's Buckman neighborhood, serves coffee and desserts. It operates from the former living room of a reportedly haunted Craftsman-style house, built in 1902 and "nearly hidden from view" by the surrounding foliage.

Rimsky-Korsakoffee has a casual, communal atmosphere and has been described by The Oregonian as a "cozy little place with an easygoing feel". The Jewish Week's travel writer called the house a "mecca for grungy young artist-types seeking caffeine, chocolate and liberal-minded conversation". Yahoo! Travel described the environment as dimly lit, with sounds of stringed instruments. The house's interior has "bizarre 70's style" wallpaper and features knickknacks, "oddball" art, and "odd things" hanging from the ceiling. Weekends feature live classical music. Guests are encouraged to write in blank journals placed throughout the house. Historically, Rimsky-Korsakoffee has accepted payments in cash only.

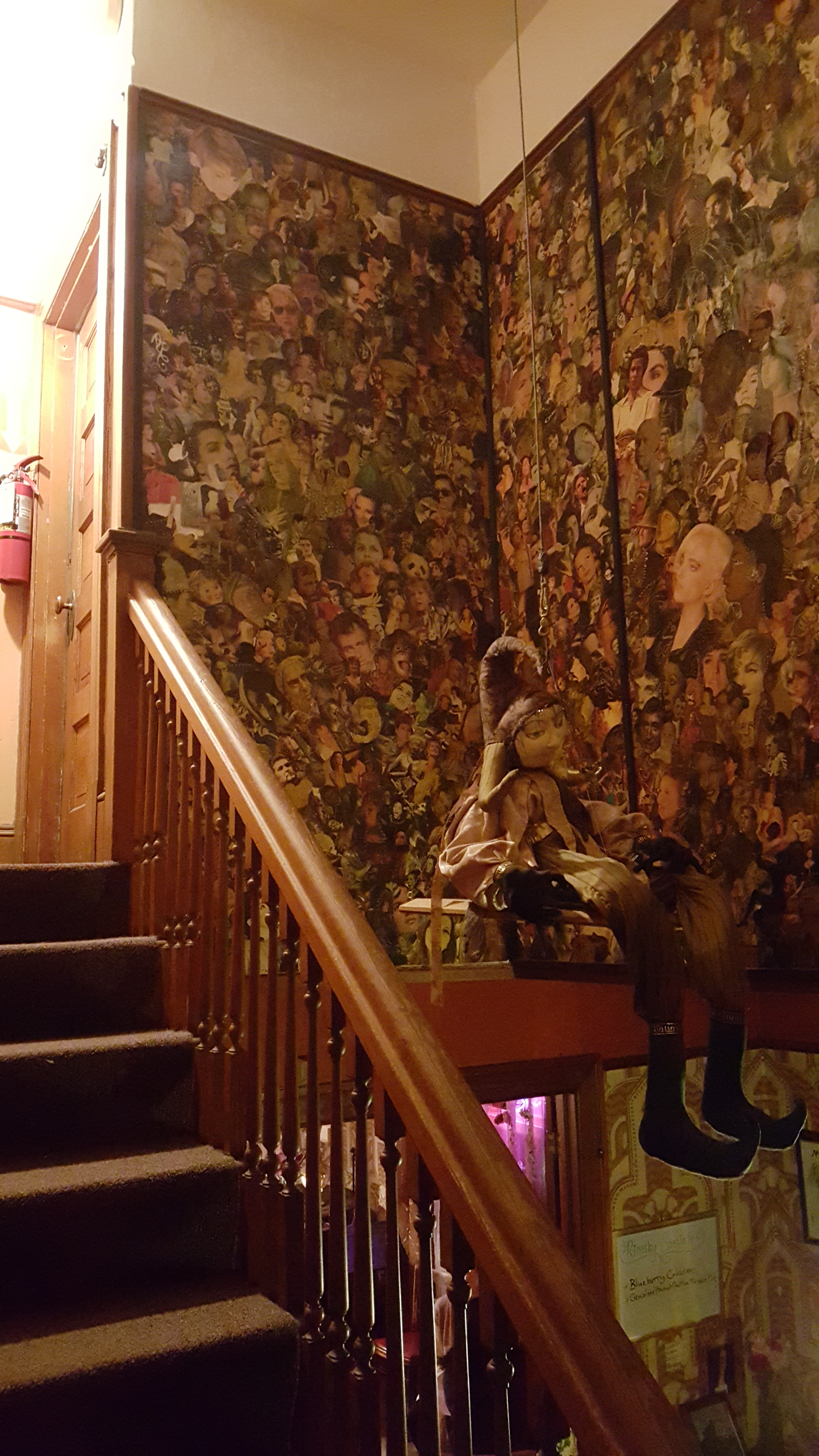
Interior staircase and wall art, 2016

According to the owner, each table is named after a different composer and has a "pseudo elegant" decor. Some of the tables are "haunted" (animated), at times rotating or vibrating; one rises 18 inches (46 cm) every 45 minutes, returning to its original position after moving through a succession of different heights. The table named for Sergei Rachmaninoff shakes when a button in the kitchen is pressed, and the Stephen Sondheim table disappears completely through a slit in the wall. Couches are also available for lounging. The upstairs unisex bathroom has an "under-the-sea" theme and reportedly "regularly induces screams".

== History ==
The coffeehouse is owned by Goody Cable, who opened it for business in 1980. According to Cable, she opened Rimsky-Korsakoffee "to stop cleaning [her] house for music parties," having hosted classical music events in her home for years prior. Her vision was an unconventional and "homelike" restaurant, attractive to conversationalists who enjoy coffee, desserts and music. Cable has established business hours that work for her and prioritizes "conversation, creation, education, game playing and enjoying nature". She insists on recycling whenever possible and is adamant that the coffeehouse will "never" have a sign to advertise the business. In 2008, Cable said she thought that locating in Portland was what made the business successful: "I don't think Rimsky's would have worked anyplace else... Certainly not for 28 years."

In 2006, The Oregonian's Vivian McInerny suggested that writer Louise Bryant once lived in the house. Bryant and her second husband, John Reed, documented parts of the Russian Revolution in works such as her Six Months in Red Russia. However, evidence analyzed by Michael Munk for publication in Oregon Historical Quarterly and elsewhere lends no support to the idea that Bryant ever lived at 707 Southeast 12th Avenue (Rimsky-Korsakoffee House's street address) and casts strong doubt on the idea that she met Reed there.

In 2020, during the COVID-19 pandemic, staff and customers hosted a GoFundMe campaign to raise $20,000.

== Reception ==
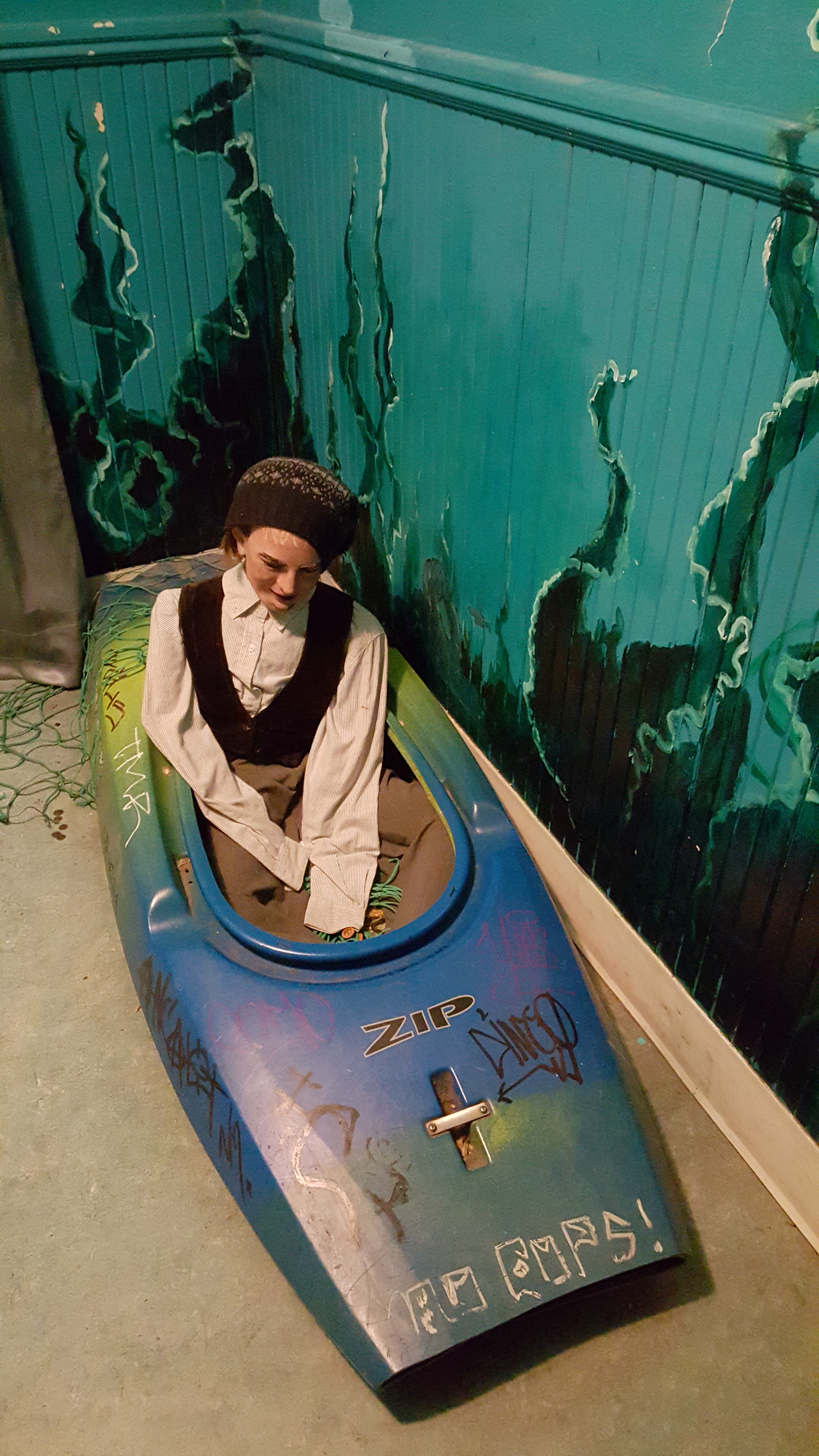
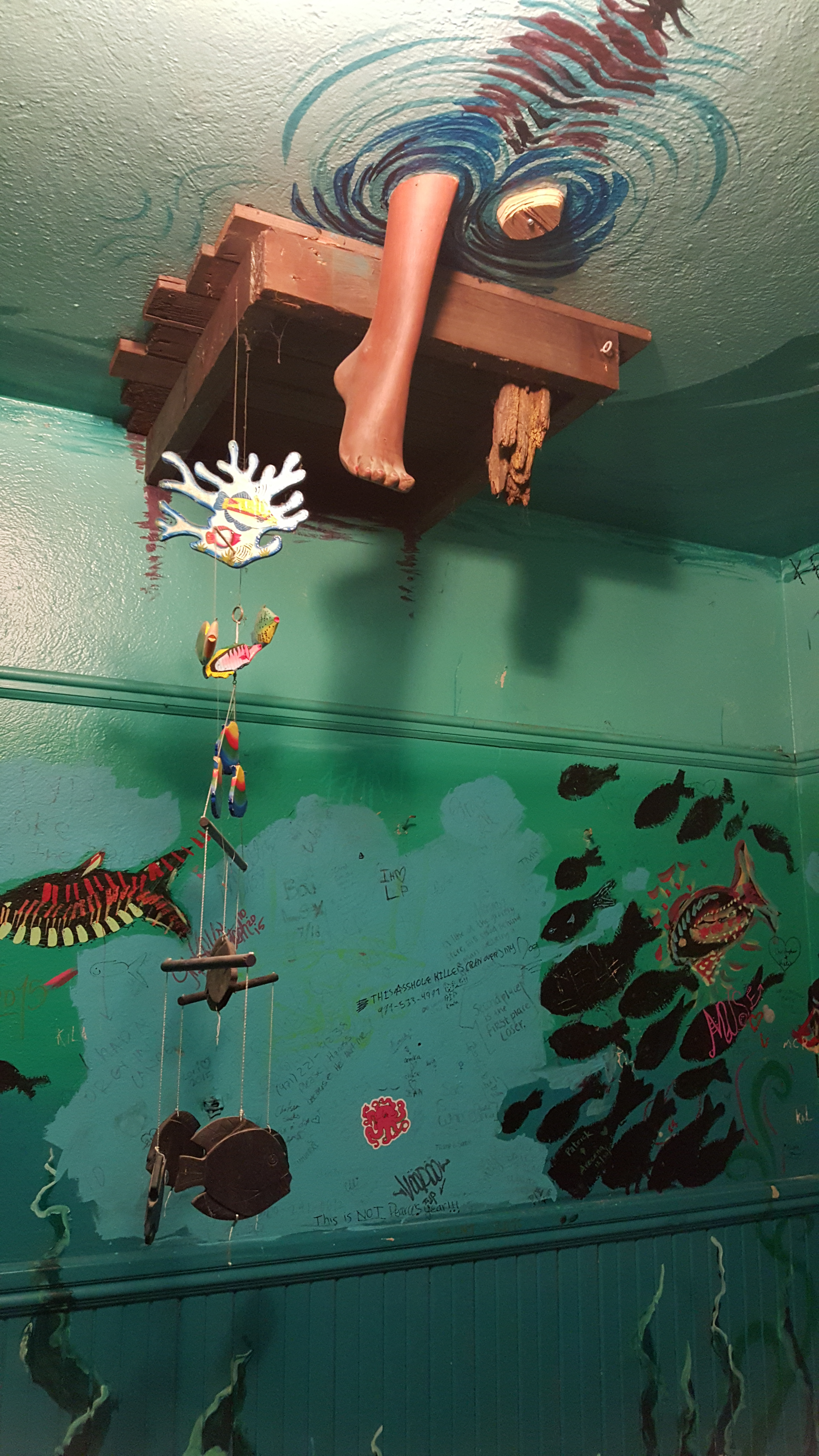
The restroom has an "under-the-sea" theme.

Rimsky-Korsakoffee has received a generally positive reception and is known mostly for its desserts and for offering a unique experience to guests. After noting its status as one of the oldest coffeehouses in Portland, Fodor's said in a Pacific Northwest guide that it remains "one of the best", specifically complimenting the desserts. In her travelogues of Portland, Rachel Dresbeck noted the coffeehouse's uniqueness and recommended the mocha fudge cake and the ice cream desserts known as "Rasputin's Vice" and "Tsar Sulton Suite". Similarly, Portland Examiner contributor Dominique Dobson called the coffeehouse "whimsical" and wrote, "this is a great evening stopoff for caffeine and dessert. It can sometimes be a bit crowded, but the mocha fudge cake is phenomenal with coffee, and the quirky clientele and (sometimes live) music can keep you lingering over that amazing cheesecake!" In his 2010 Frommer's guide titled Portable Portland, Karl Samson noted the coffeehouse's loyal patrons, calling it "Portland's favorite dessert hangout for more than 25 years." Julian Smith wrote in a 2012 Frommer's guide, Portland Day by Day, that Rimsky-Korsakoffee is the "most atmospheric" of the city's coffee establishments, with "fun and sassy" waiters, desserts "to die for" and bathrooms "you have to see to believe". Ari Shapiro, a journalist and White House correspondent for NPR who has performed with the band Pink Martini, was raised in Portland and worked at Rimsky-Korsakoffee.

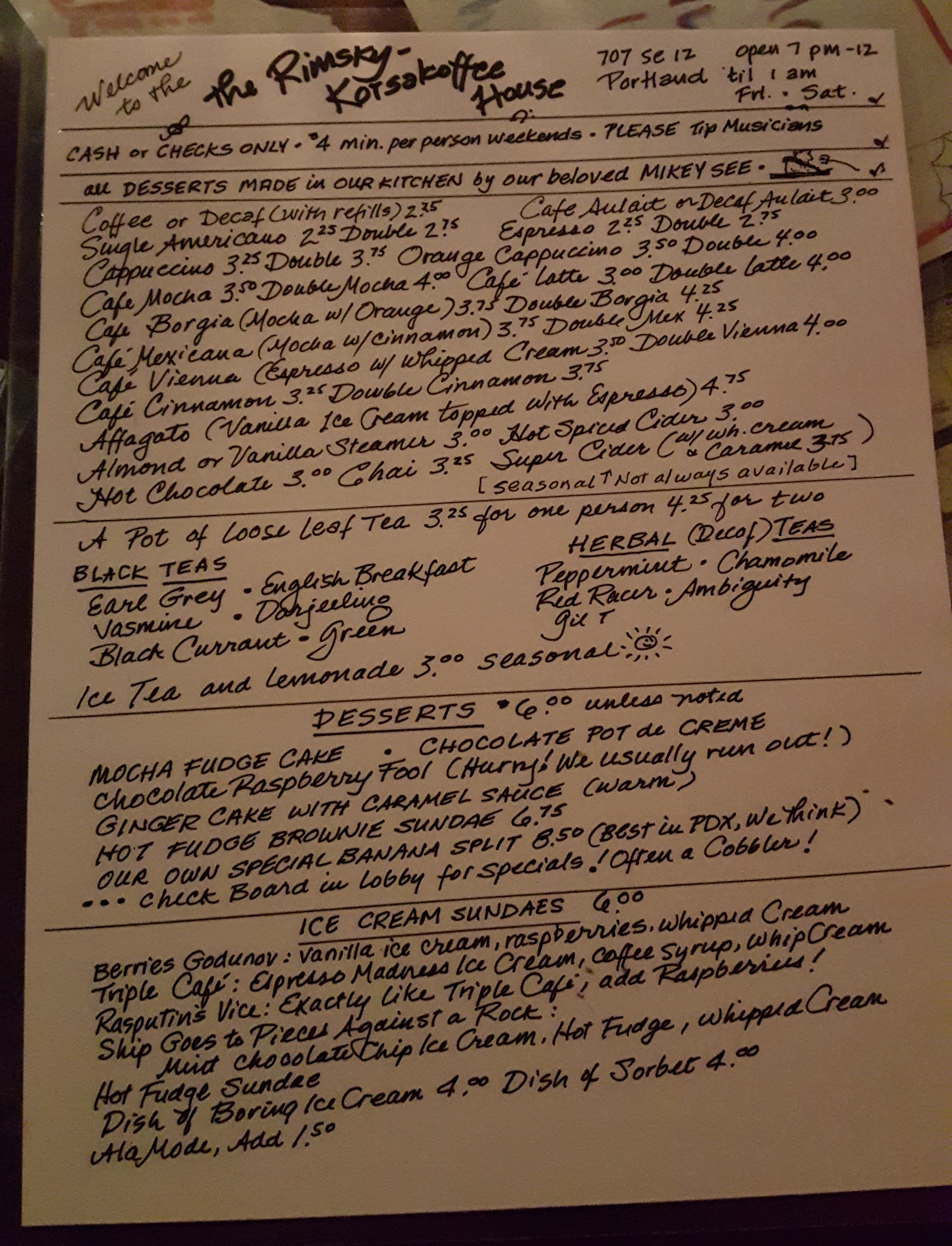
Menu, 2016

The Portland Mercury described the coffeehouse as an "eclectic spot". According to the paper, the reported haunting and surrounding trees and shrubs "make you feel like you've slipped into a dimension similar but not quite the same as our own". In her book, Oregon Oddities, Harriet Baskas wrote that the tables and decorations are "surprising, alarming, and quite curious". One contributor to the Daily Vanguard, Portland State University's (PSU) student newspaper, included the house in her overview of Portland's "odd and peculiar eateries". She described it as a "novelty", suitable for late-night adventures. A student blogger for the PSU Chronicles recommended Rimsky-Korsakoffee as a destination for people under the age of 21.

Willamette Week called the coffeehouse a unique, "nights-only" establishment that "screams 'only in Portland' ". The publication found the service staff to be friendly, and sometimes slow. In 2005, Willamette Week readers ranked Rimsky-Korsakoffee third in the categories "Best Coffee Shop" and "Best Dessert". The coffeehouse ranked first in a similar poll conducted in 2007. Yahoo! Travel called the coffee "rich" and the ice cream desserts "attractive". The guide considered the "eclectic haunt" a "spooky alternative" to an evening at a bar, club or movie. Zagat described the coffeehouse as "quirky" and "unlike any other place in Portland". The restaurant guide also called the decor of the upstairs bathroom "famous". David Stabler, music critic for The Oregonian, recommended the coffeehouse for post-concert visits and awarded it the title "Best concert-in-a-coffeehouse".

Rimsky-Korsakoffee was a finalist in the "Best Dessert" category of The Village Voice's "Best of Portland" list for 2011 but lost to Pix Pâtisserie. In 2013, the San Jose Mercury News named Rimsky-Korsakofee the "Coffee Shop That Should Get You Amped" in a piece about the more peculiar aspects of Portland ("Keep Portland Weird"); the publication called the house's bathroom the "funkiest" in town. In 2020, Eater Portland's Brooke Jackson-Glidden wrote, "There are very few places left in Portland with the same energy as Rimsky's. Earnestly and delightfully bizarre, the craftsman-turned-cafe with the moving tables and servers delivering deadpan puns somehow avoids coming across as gimmicky, a favorite hangout for local high schoolers and lifelong Portlanders who come for coffee and desserts."

== See also ==
- Reportedly haunted locations in Oregon
- Theme restaurant
