= Coffee Time (Portland, Oregon) =

Coffeehouse in Portland, Oregon, U.S.

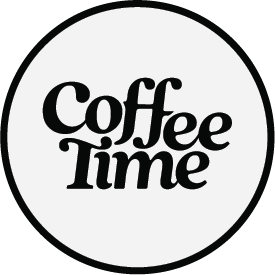

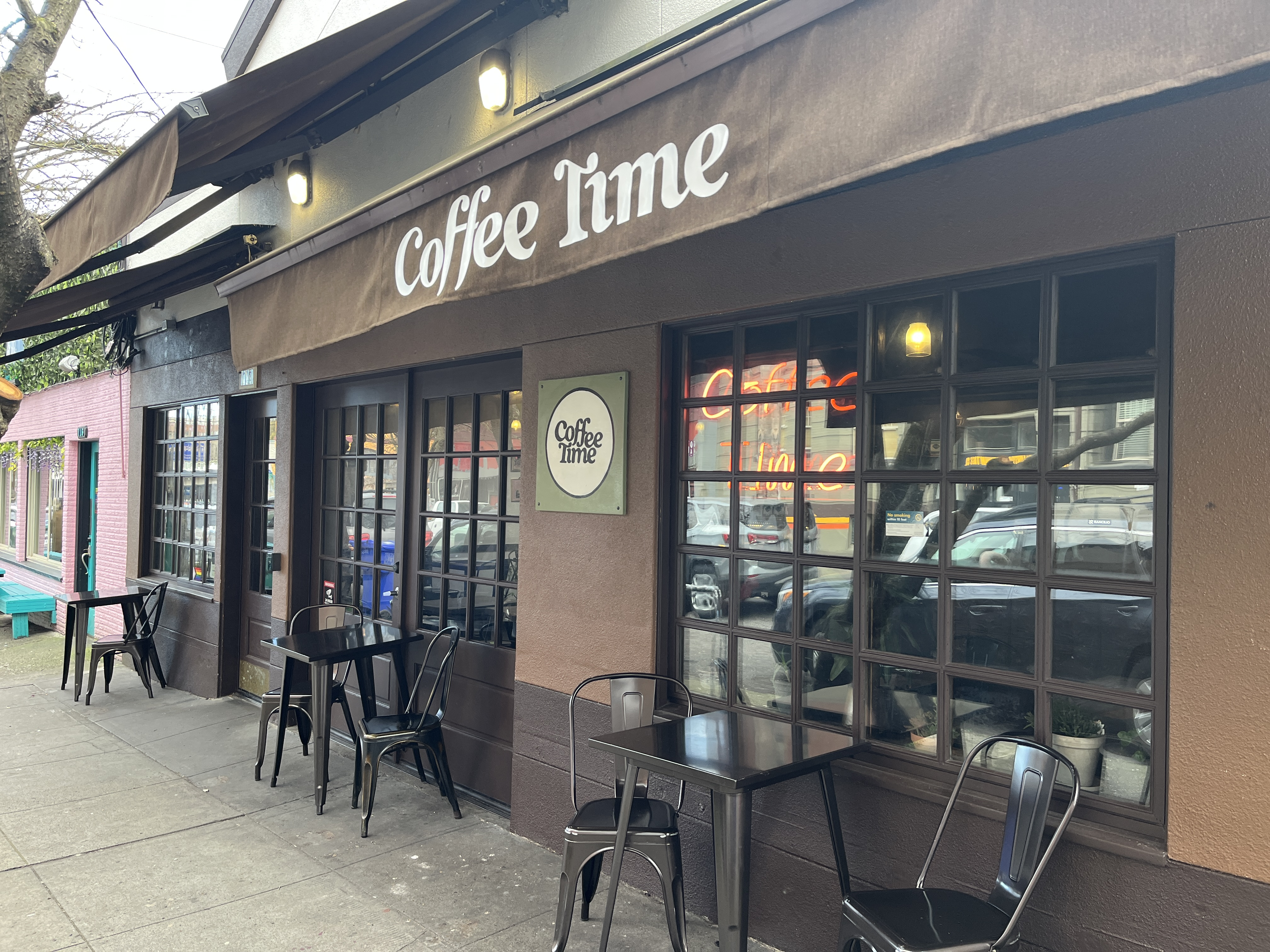
- The coffeehouse's exterior in 2026
- Interactive map of Coffee Time

Restaurant information
- Established: 1994
- Owner: Susan Thomas
- Location: 712 NW 21st Avenue, Portland, Oregon, United States
- Coordinates: 45.5280°N 122.6942°W
- Website: coffeetimepdx.com

Coffee Time is a coffeehouse in Portland, Oregon's Northwest District, in the United States. The business was established in 1994.

== Description ==
Coffee Time is a coffeehouse along Northwest 21st Avenue. Willamette Week has described Coffee Time as "the place for westside night owls to get a 10 pm latte and settle into a studious nook" and an establishment with "increasingly cozy, lamp-lit corners as you walk farther into the well-worn space". Coffee Time features coffee roasted in-house and displays local artwork.

In the eighth edition of Best Places: Portland (2010), authors John Gottberg and Elizabeth Lopeman said Coffee Time hosted "semiregular" performance nights and wrote, "Any time of day or night, you'll find buzzing yuppies, mellow hippies, and newly existentialist teenagers all bonding over their love of java". In 2020, Pete Cottell of Thrillist said of the clientele and space: "Chess players usually dominate the sidewalk seating in the summer, but the cavernous back rooms are perfect for feeling like you've sulked off to some far away plane inhabited by drifters and dilettantes who are hell-bent on finally finishing that manuscript that's been knocking around in their head for a decade."

== History ==
Coffee Time opened in 1994. Susan Thomas was a co-owner, as of 2019.

Jarrod Schwegler served as manager, as of 2020. During the COVID-19 pandemic, Coffee Times' staff was reduced from seven employees to three, and the business continued to sell products online.

== Reception ==
Writing for Willamette Week in 2015, Pete Cottell included Coffee Time and two other coffeehouses in the "dive" category in his overview of Portland's best coffee shops for working on a laptop. In his 2020 overview of "Portland's Best Coffee Shops With WiFi" for Thrillist, Cottell called Coffee Time the "best for hiding in a dimly-lit corner".

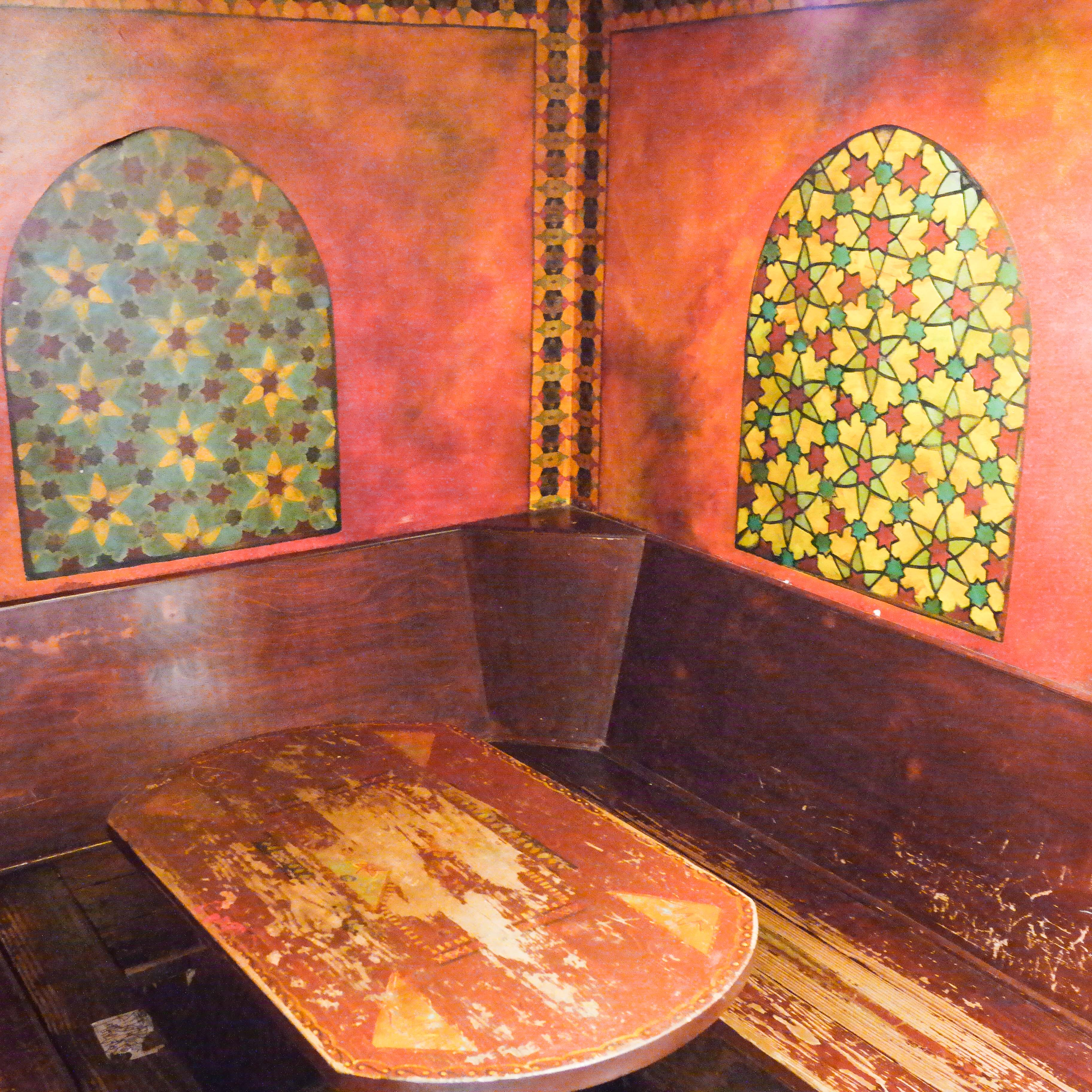
A booth at Coffee Time, 2014

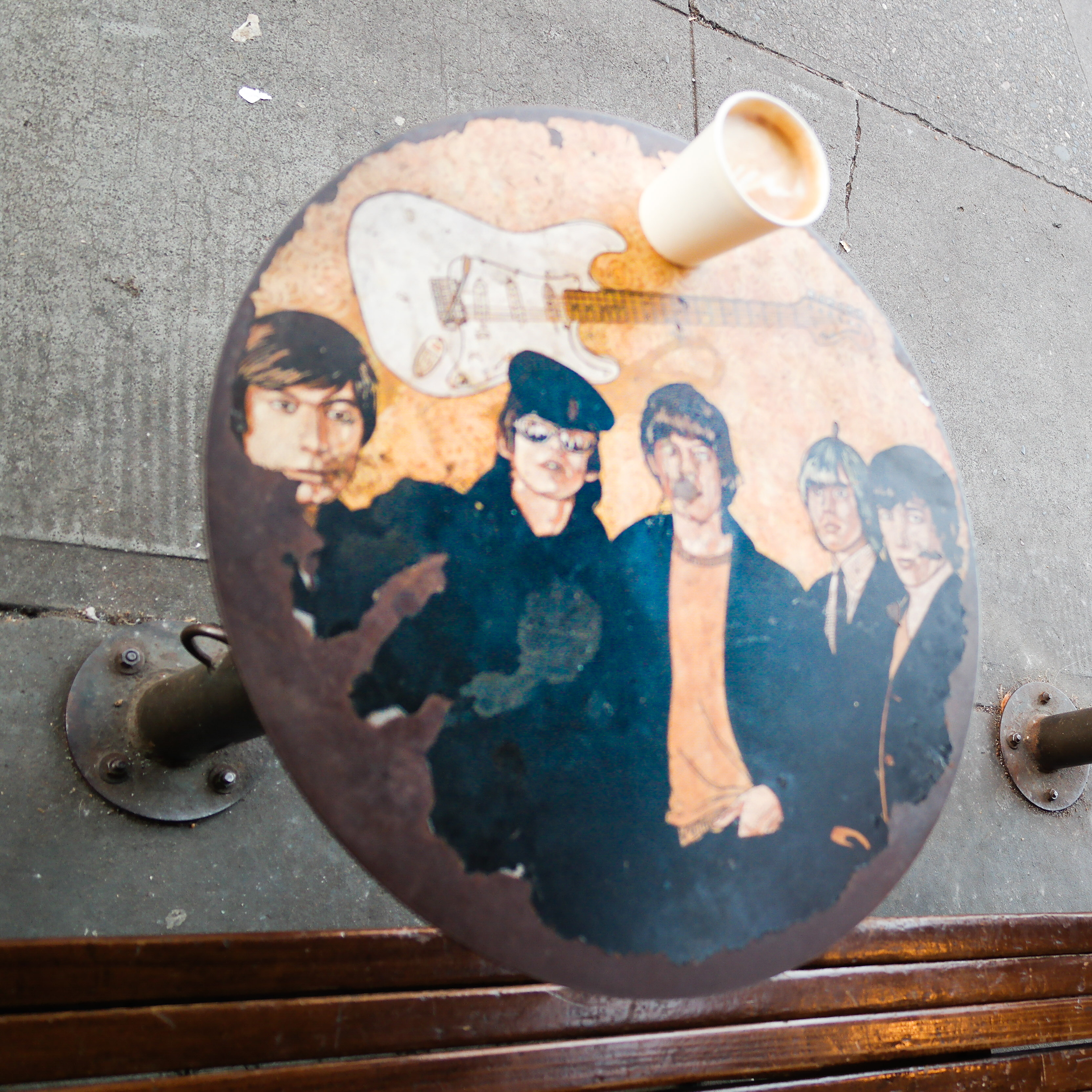
Table and paper-cup cappuccino outside the coffeehouse, 2014
