= Tōv Coffee =

Coffee shop in Portland, Oregon, U.S.

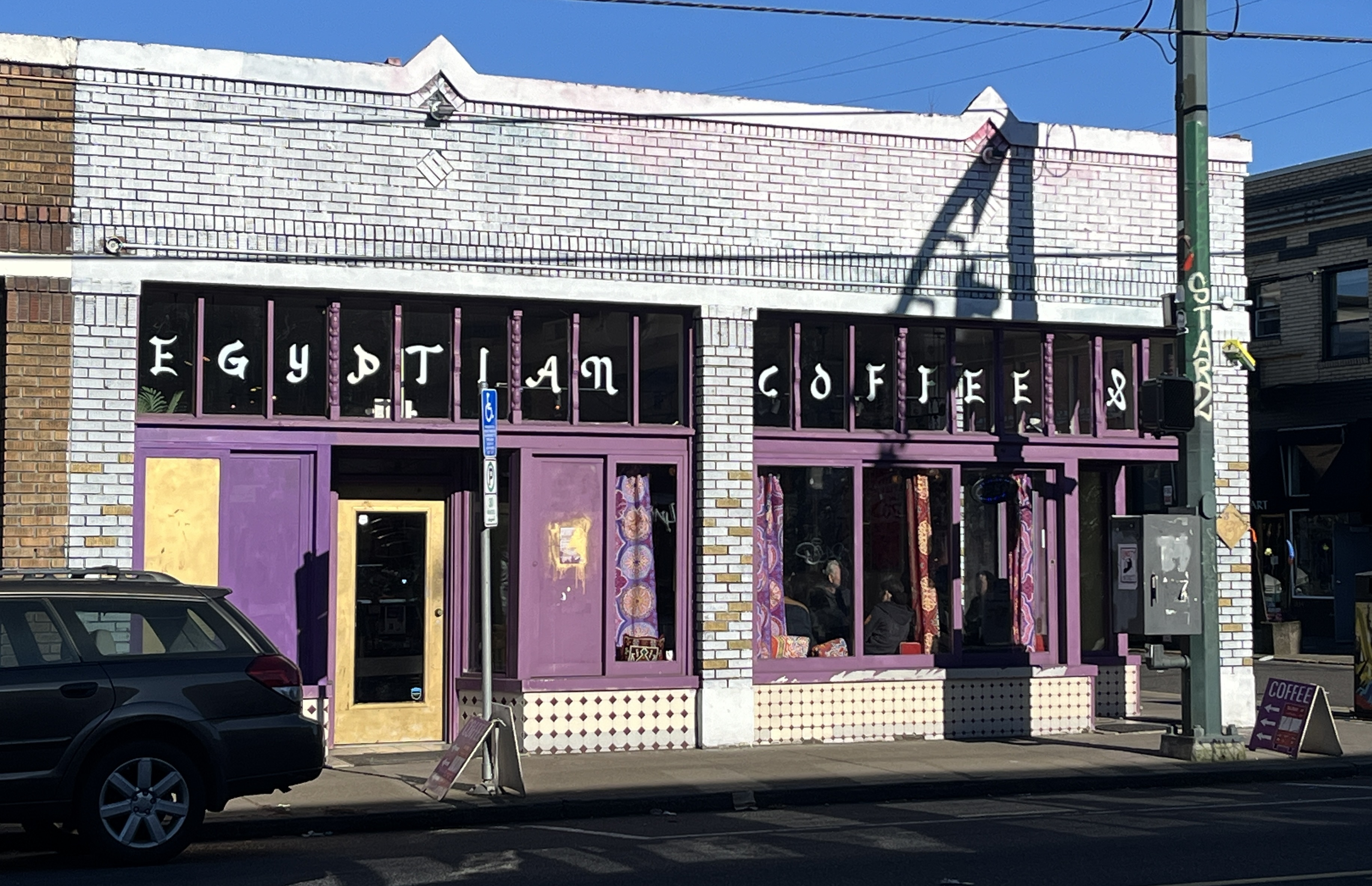
- The coffee shop's exterior, 2025
- Interactive map of Tōv Coffee

Restaurant information
- Established: August 2015
- Owner: Joseph Nazir
- Location: 3639 Southeast Hawthorne Boulevard, Portland, Multnomah, Oregon, 97214, United States
- Coordinates: 45.5122°N 122.6260°W
- Website: tovcoffee.com

Tōv Coffee is a coffee shop in Portland, Oregon, United States. Established in 2015, the business operated from a double-decker bus before moving into a brick and mortar shop on Hawthorne Boulevard in southeast Portland's Sunnyside neighborhood in 2023. Tōv serves Egyptian-, Turkish-, and American-style coffee and tea drinks. The business has garnered a positive reception and has been featured on the Netflix series Somebody Feed Phil.

== Description ==
Tōv Coffee is a coffee company in Portland, Oregon. The business operated from a red double-decker bus with Middle Eastern and Turkish decor, before moving into a brick and mortar shop on Hawthorne Boulevard in southeast Portland's Sunnyside neighborhood. Tōv's interior has couches and cushions with ornate embroidery. The business serves Egyptian-, Turkish-, and American-style coffee (including espresso) and tea drinks, and makes its own syrups. Food options include pastries such as ba'alawa and cheese knafeh.

Drinks include a cardamom Americano, a cardamom-caramel latte, and a rose mocha. The Chocolate Jesus is a cappuccino with chocolate milk. The Cozy Yum Yum has chai, rose, caramel and apple cider, and the Sounds Like Trouble with the Cops is a latte with a vanilla rum syrup. The Mint Thing is a cold brew coffee with mint syrup.

== History ==
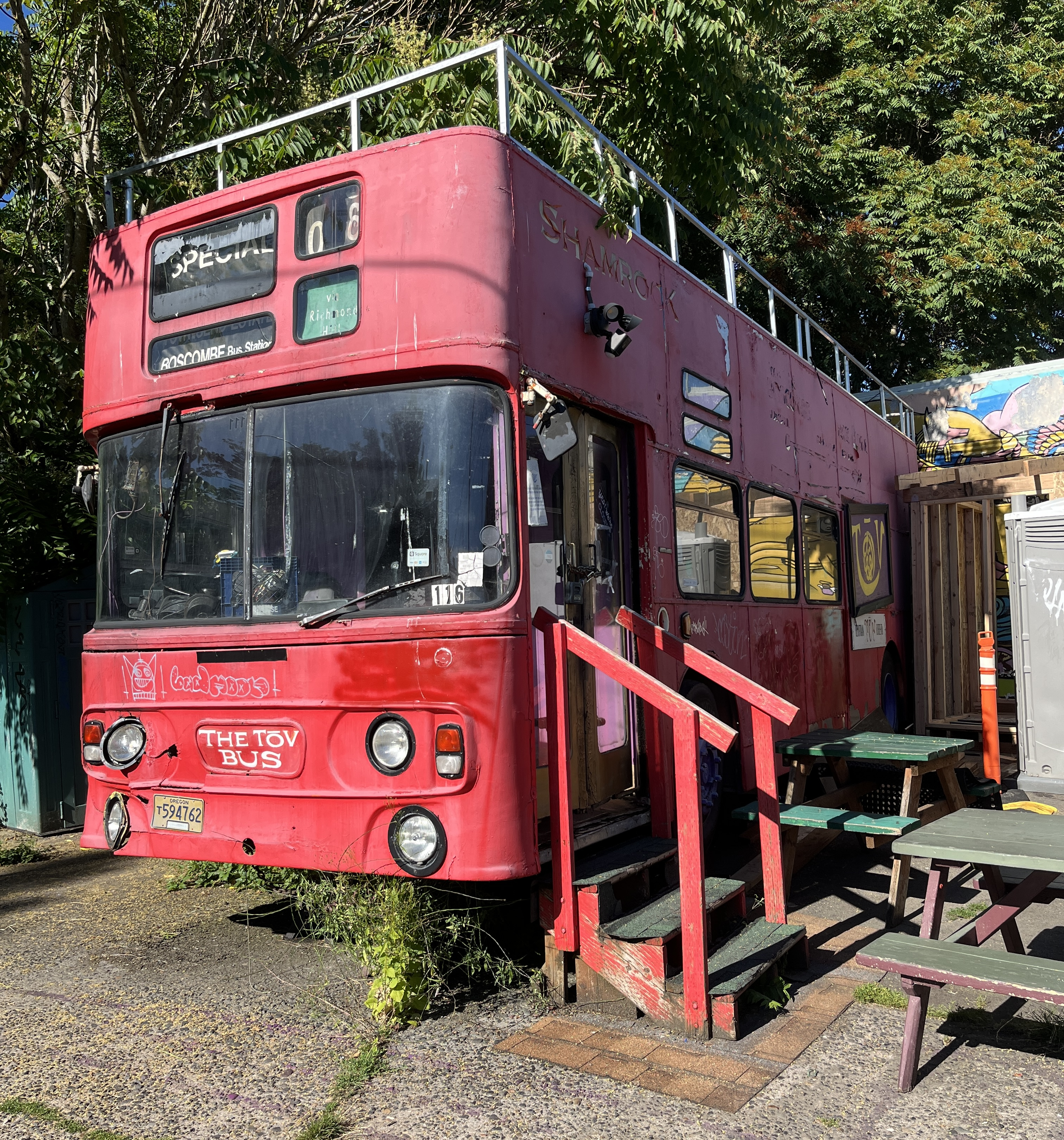
The bus in 2025

Owner Joseph Nazir began operating Tōv from the bus on Hawthorne Boulevard in August 2015. He later asked artists Travis Czekalski and Jon Stommel of Rather Severe to create a mural and other art for the double-decker bus. According to Willamette Week, "They decided to honor Nazir's [Egyptian] culture, with anthropomorphic characters like a sphinx holding a coffee cup and a pyramid smiling bashfully. In the process, Rather Severe managed to cover up some racist graffiti that had been previously been[sic] written there."

Nazir has canned the Mint Thing with coffee, mint, oat milk, and raw cane sugar. The business moved from the bus to the brick and mortar shop in late 2023. Nazir put the bus up for sale in January 2025.

Tōv has been featured on the Netflix travel documentary series Somebody Feed Phil.

== Reception ==
Tōv was included in Willamette Week's 2015 list of Portland's ten best new coffee shops. Ben Waterhouse included the business in The Oregonian's 2017 list of Portland's five "most innovative" coffee shops. Lindsay D. Mattison ranked Tōv number eight in Tasting Table's 2023 list of Portland's fifteen best coffee shops. She called the business "one of the most unique coffee shops on this list" and wrote, "The combination of the space's eclectic decor and the drink presentation on gold-plated, brightly decorated platters will transport you to another country."

In 2023, Thom Hilton and Michelle DeVona included Tōv in Eater Portland's overview of recommended restaurants in the Hawthorne District, and the website's Katrina Yentch and Nathan Williams included the business in a list of 21 "distinctive" cafes in the city that roast their own coffee. In 2024, Tōv was included in Eater Portland's list of the city's best coffee shops, as well as Noms Magazine's overview of Portland's twelve best coffee shops. Portland Monthly has described Tōv as the city's "most exotic" coffee shop.
