= Cathedral Coffee =

Coffee company in the U.S. state of Oregon

- Interactive map of Cathedral Coffee

Restaurant information
- Location: Oregon, United States
- Coordinates: 45.5840°N 122.7463°W
- Website: cathedralcoffee.com

Cathedral Coffee is a coffee company based in Portland, Oregon, United States. The business operates in north Portland's Cathedral Park neighborhood, near St. Johns, and in Lake Oswego, Scappoose, and St. Helens.

== Description ==
Cathedral Coffee operates in the U.S. state of Oregon. In the Portland metropolitan area, the business operates in Portland and Lake Oswego. There is also a roastery in St. Helens and a shop in St. Helens.

The location in Cathedral Park (near St. Johns) neighborhood of north Portland has "graffiti-art walls, long live-edge wooden tables, and a little library nook with velvet armchairs and '90s coffee shop vibes", according to Portland Monthly. Willamette Week described the location as "basically a two-seat reading nook built into a corner of the wide-open main room, distinguished by ceiling-high wooden shelves stocked with random books and old issues of National Geographic". The interior has bookshelves and wing chairs.

=== Menu ===
In addition to coffee drinks, the menu includes pastries such as a honey ham and pepper jack cheese turnover, banana bread with chocolate chips, and cinnamon rolls, fritters, quiches, and scones.

== History ==
Cathedral Coffee was founded in Cathedral Park in 2013.

Matthieu Galizia is a co-owner. In addition to Portland, the business operates in Lake Oswego.

Cathedral operates three locations. In 2025, the business received backlash for removing Pride flags.

== Reception ==
Pete Cottell included Cathedral in Thrillist's 2020 overview of the best coffee shops in Portland with Wi-Fi. He described the business as a "mainstay" for University of Portland students and said Cathedral was "best for aspiring influencers seeking good vibes". Portland Monthly included Cathedral in a 2023 "definitive guide" to the city's best independent coffee shops. Rebecca Roland and Brooke Jackson-Glidden included Cathedral in Eater Portland's 2024 overview of the best restaurants and food carts in St. Johns. The duo said the business caters to University of Portland students and "is an essential part of the St. Johns community".
