= Caffè Umbria =

Coffee shop in Seattle

Logo

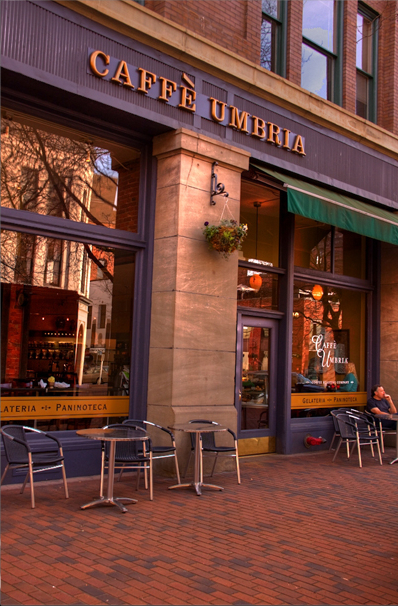
Exterior of a Seattle location

Caffè Umbria is a coffee roaster based in Seattle, Washington, United States. The chain has been described as "an Italian family business". Caffè Umbria was established by third-generation roaster Emanuele Bizzarri, the son of Umberto.

As of 2025, Caffè Umbria operates four cafes in the Seattle metropolitan area, three in Portland, Oregon, two in Chicago, and one in Miami.

== Description ==
Caffè Umbria is a coffee roaster based in Seattle, with additional locations in Portland, Oregon, as well as Chicago. In addition to coffee, the menu has included paninis, pastries, and gelato.

The company's flagship is located on Occidental Avenue in Seattle's Pioneer Square neighborhood. Seattle Magazine has described the flagship as "one part Pioneer Square (exposed brick) and one part Perugia (Italian tile and ceramic)", with standing tables and an espresso machine imported from Italy.

Willamette Week said the location in Portland's Pearl District has a "sleek, modern, steel-and-glass enclosure" with a "brick-lined corner ... set aside for soccer viewing".

== History ==
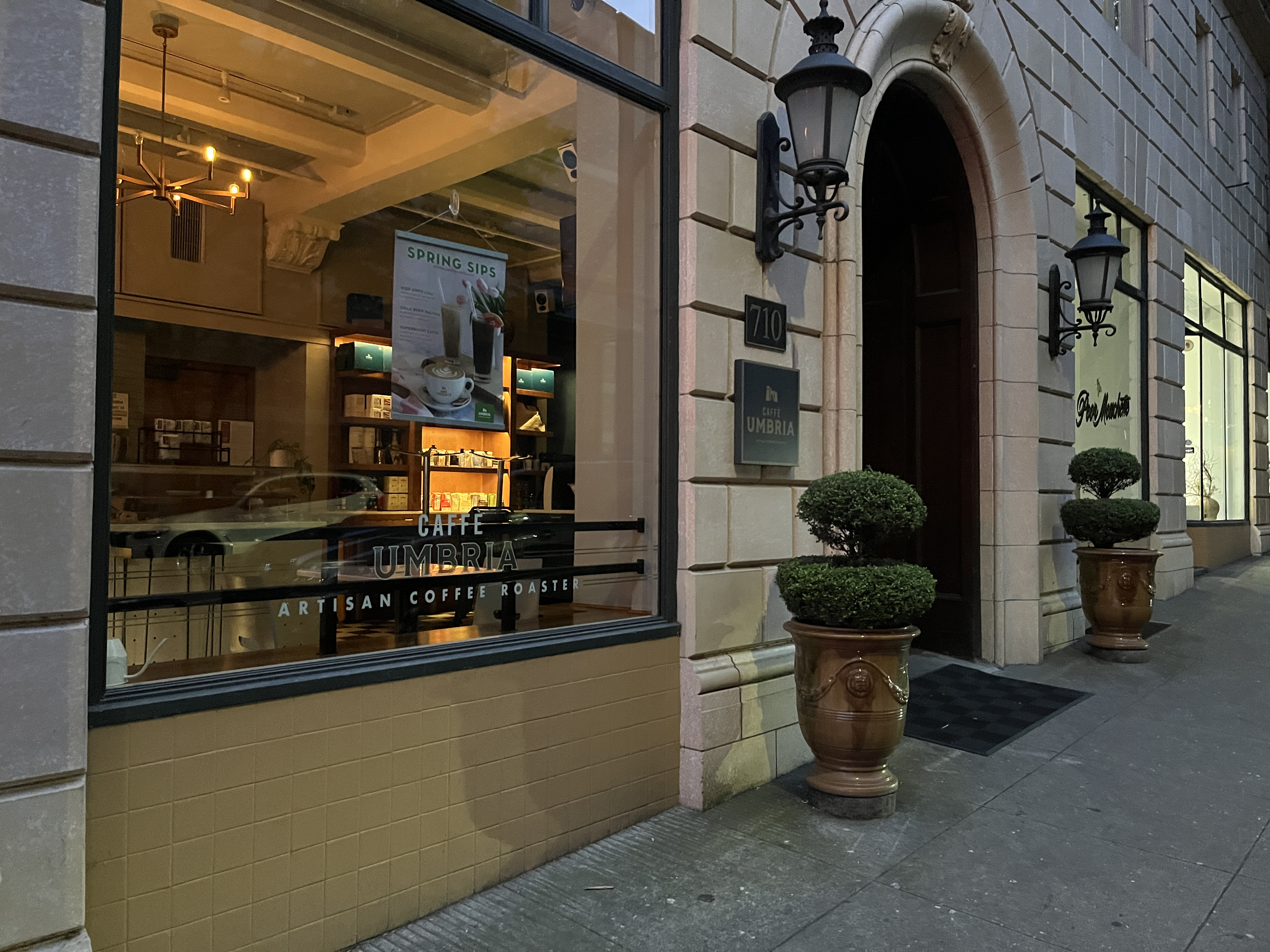
A location in Portland, Oregon, in 2025

Umbria was established by the Bizzarri family as a wholesale coffee roaster in Seattle's Georgetown neighborhood in 2002. The business opened its flagship location in Pioneer Square in 2005. Since then, Caffè Umbria has expanded to three locations in Seattle, including one in Ballard.

In Portland, the business operates in the Pearl District, on Southwest Madison, and on Southwest Market.

The company's first location in Chicago opened in River North in 2015. The Logan Square location opened in 2017.

== Reception ==
In an overview of "favorite experiences" of Portland, Frommer's said Caffè Umbria offered the city's best latte and "the most attractive and congenial cafe in the upscale Pearl District". The guide also said, "Caffe Umbria is a good rest stop while you're exploring the rest of the Pearl." Hannah Wallace of Inc. wrote about the Pearl District location: "Portland is known for its coffee, but Caffè Umbria feels more like a detour to Perugia. Owned by a third-generation Italian roaster, this busy Pearl District café functions like a branch office for entrepreneurs and VCs who meet over macchiatos and panini."

== See also ==
- List of coffeehouse chains
- List of restaurant chains in the United States
