= Case Study Coffee Roasters =

American coffee company

- Headquarters: Portland, Oregon, U.S.
- Products: Coffee

Case Study Coffee Roasters is a coffee company with multiple locations in Portland, Oregon, United States.

== Description ==
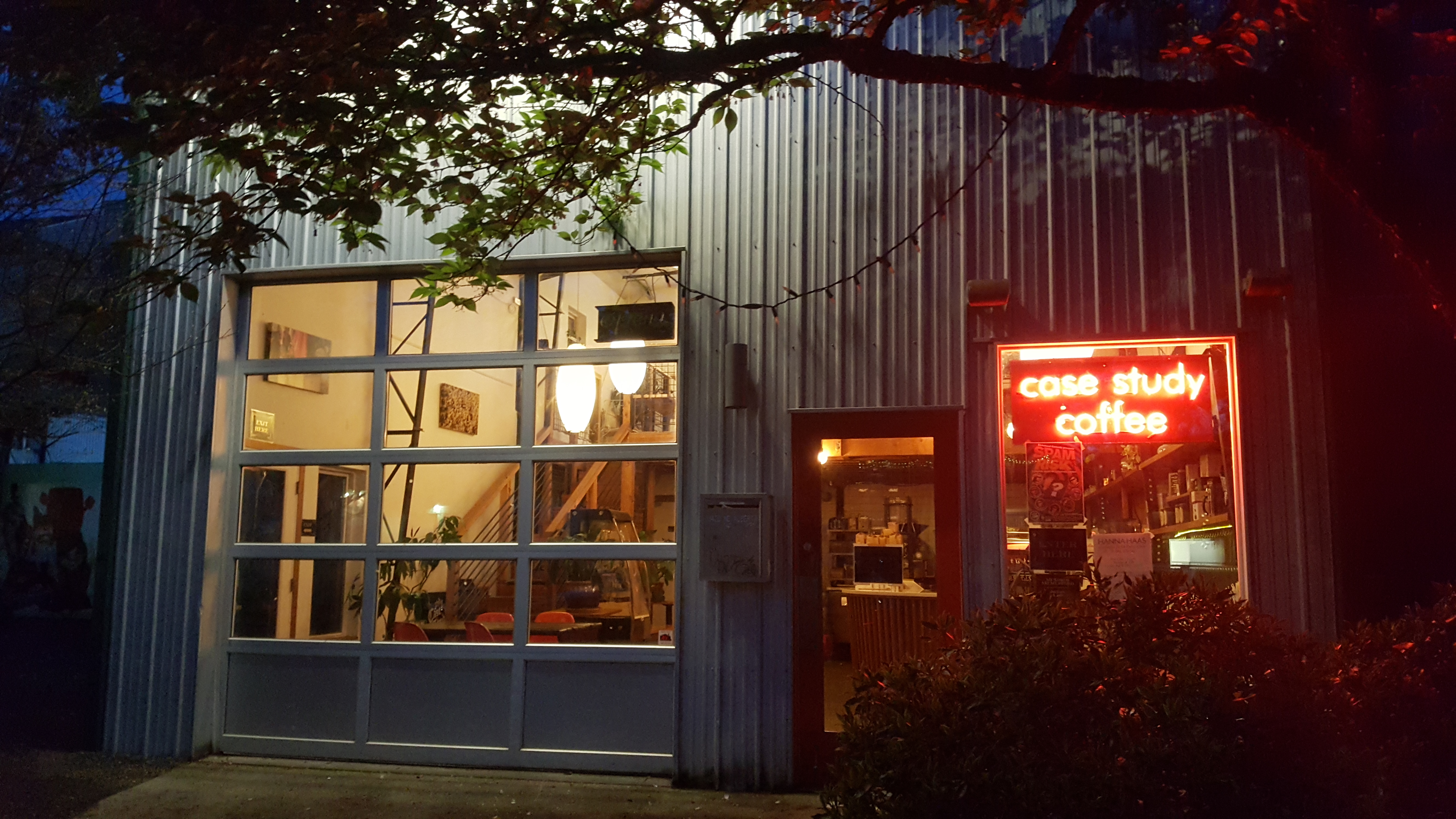
Exterior of the Alberta Street location in northeast Portland, Oregon, 2022

Walker MacMurdo of Willamette Week wrote in 2016, "With dignified, third-wave takes on Starbucks-style candy drinks—all flavored with housemade syrups and potions—alongside traditional drip and espresso coffee, Case Study is among Portland's most chill fancy coffee spots, an ideal place to get an hour or two of work done in between people watching."

Fodor's says the business "serves small-batch, house-roasted coffee in a variety of formats, from Chemex to Aeropress to crowds of regulars". In her Moon-published guide book for the Pacific Northwest, Allison Williams wrote, "Unlike the very hip Stumptown, Case Study Coffee is more about the café vibe." She said the business sold bagels, granola, and pastries, in addition to coffee.

== History ==
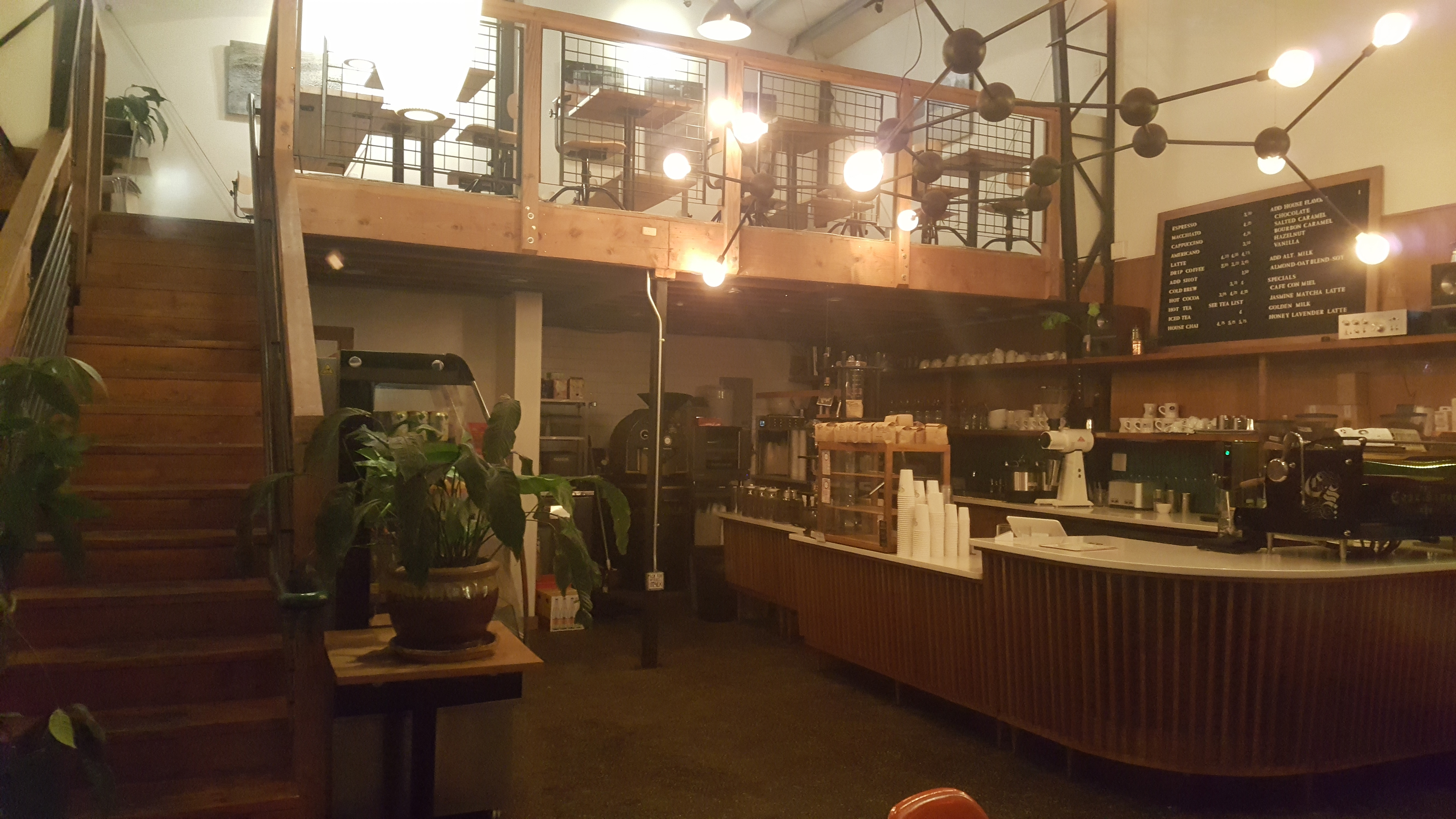
Interior of the Alberta Street location

The business is owned by spouses Wes Russell and Christine Herman. The first store opened on Sandy Boulevard in northeast Portland's Rose City Park neighborhood. A second opened in downtown Portland in 2012, and a third opened on Alberta Street in northeast Portland's King neighborhood 2014.

== Reception ==
Teresa K. Traverse included Case Study in The Daily Meal's 2014 list of "7 Artisanal Coffee Roasters to Visit in Portland". Samantha Bakall included the business in The Oregonian's 2017 list of the 10 best coffee shops in downtown Portland. Cast Study was named Best Coffee Shop in Willamette Week's "Best of Portland" readers' poll in 2016 and 2017.

== See also ==
- List of coffeehouse chains
- List of restaurant chains in the United States
