= Hosford-Abernethy, Portland, Oregon =

Hosford-Abernethy
- Neighborhood
- Interactive map of Hosford-Abernethy
- Coordinates: 45°30′17″N 122°38′42″W
- Country: United States
- State: Oregon
- City: Portland

Government
  - Association: Hosford-Abernethy Neighborhood; Development Association (HAND)
  - Coalition: Southeast Uplift

Area
  - Total: 1.30 sq mi (3.36 km^{2})

Population (2000)
  - Total: 6,932
  - Density: 5,340/sq mi (2,060/km^{2})

Housing
  - No. of households: 3243
  - Occupancy rate: 96% occupied
  - Owner-occupied: 1660 households (51%)
  - Renting: 1583 households (49%)
  - Avg. household size: 2.14 persons

Hosford-Abernethy is a neighborhood in the inner Southeast section of Portland, Oregon. It borders Buckman and Sunnyside on the north, Richmond on the east, Brooklyn and Creston-Kenilworth on the south, and (across the Willamette River) Downtown Portland and South Portland on the west.

Hosford-Abernethy was named in the 1970s for two schools in the neighborhood, Hosford Middle School (commemorating early Portland resident and Methodist minister Chauncey Hosford) and Abernethy Elementary School (commemorating fellow Methodist minister and Provisional Governor of the Oregon Territory, George Abernethy).

The north central area of the neighborhood, with its distinctive X-shaped street pattern, is known as Ladd's Addition.

The Oregon Museum of Science and Industry is located on the riverfront of Hosford-Abernethy, at the southern end of the Vera Katz Eastbank Esplanade.
