= Bipartisan Cafe =

Coffee shop in Portland, Oregon, U.S.

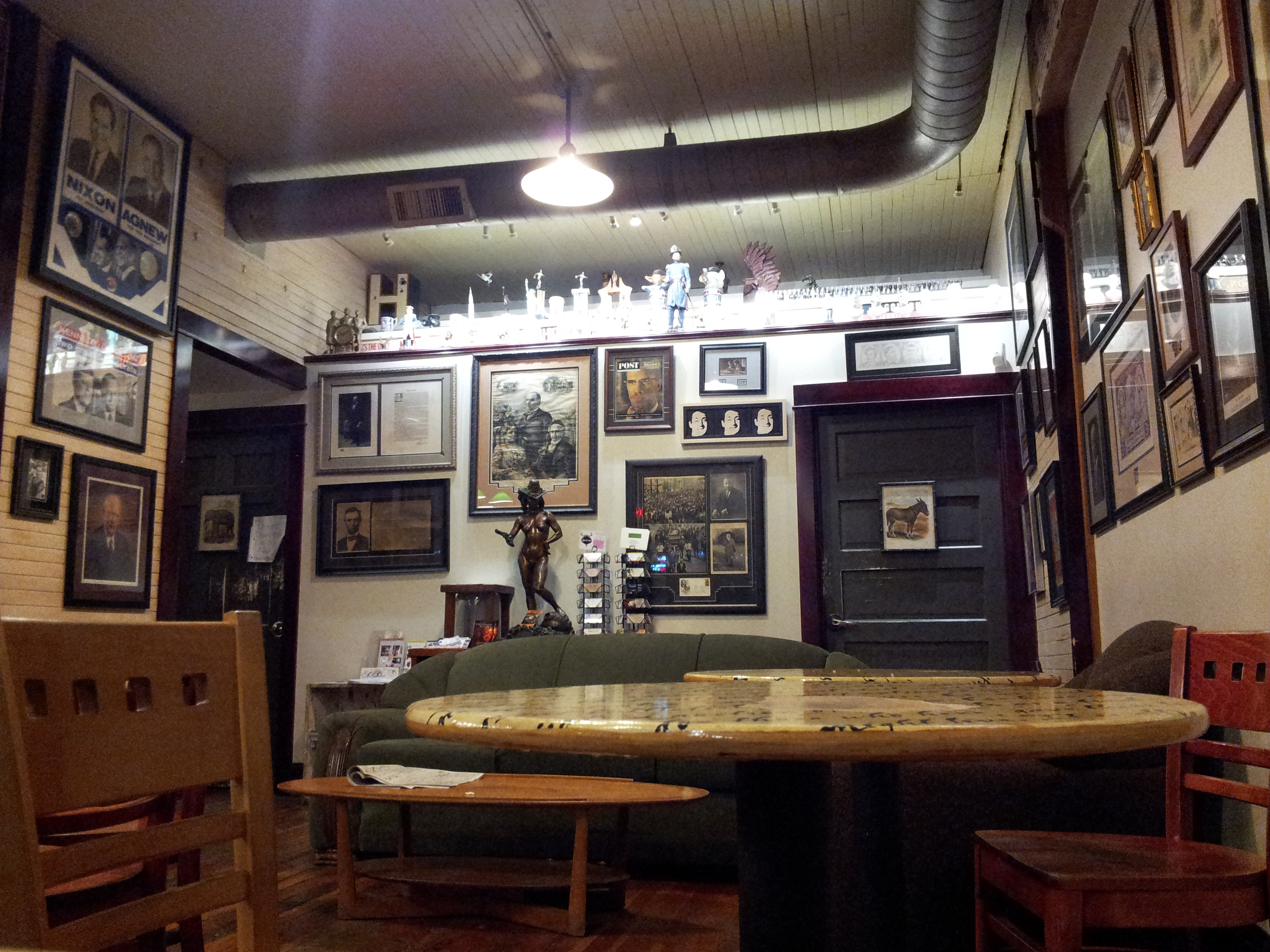
- The cafe's interior in 2013
- Interactive map of Bipartisan Cafe

Restaurant information
- Established: 2005
- Owner: Josh Pangelinan
- Previous owners: Hobie Bender; Peter Emerson
- Location: 7901 Southeast Stark Street, Portland, Multnomah, Oregon, 97215, United States
- Coordinates: 45.5193°N 122.5823°W

Bipartisan Cafe is a coffee shop and bakery in the Montavilla neighborhood of Portland, Oregon, United States. Since Hobie Bender and Peter Emerson started the business in 2005, the venue has hosted events that include meetings of civic groups and politicians, and viewing parties for political events. Bipartisan Cafe has garnered a positive reception, and has been named as one of Portland's best coffee and pie eateries. The venue's marionberry pie was included in the American Automobile Association's 2022 list of the ten best regional Western dishes.

== Description ==
Bipartisan Cafe is a coffee shop and bakery in the Montavilla neighborhood of Portland, Oregon. The cafe is a community gathering space as its owners intended. The venue has hosted political events, book readings and signings, and concerts. In 2008, The Oregonian's Benjamin Brink wrote: "The cafe quickly became a community gathering place, full of young families, longtime residents and students from the nearby colleges bent over laptops." According to Oregon Wine Press, "From day one, the café has been based on building community and 'working with people to try to create a place where they can get along on a real level'." Lonely Planet has said the cafe is "where big ideas are hatched at small tables and the walls are plastered with episodes from US history".

=== Interior ===
Eater Portland's Brooke Jackson-Glidden described Bipartisan Cafe as "an eclectic space decorated with American historical memorabilia". The interior includes framed posters of James Buchanan, John F. Kennedy, Richard Nixon, and Martin Van Buren, as well as portraits of Geronimo, Martin Luther King Jr., and Harriet Tubman. There are also posters of Norman Rockwell's 1943 painting series Four Freedoms and other political memorabilia such as ballots, bumper stickers, campaign buttons and pins, and a voting machine from Palm Beach, Florida, that was used in the 2000 United States presidential election. Many of the items are from Emerson's personal collection, which he started in 1980.

In 2010, S.J. Sebellin-Ross of The Oregonian wrote, "Bipartisan Cafe has a maroon sofa and soft chairs permanently contoured by a parade of bodies, and a fat hole in the middle of the floor looking into the basement." There is also a play area for children. The same newspaper's Su-jin Yim called Bipartisan "kid-friendly" in 2006.

=== Menu ===
Bipartisan serves pie, including vegan and gluten-free options, as well as salads, sandwiches, and soups. The menu has also included bagels with lox, and quiches.

Pie flavors have included banana cream, blueberry, cherry, chocolate cream, chocolate orange cream, chocolate silk, espresso cream, key lime, and marionberry, and marionberry mixed with lemon curd or peach. The owner's family recipe is used for the marionberry pie. The triple-berry pie has blackberries, blueberries, and raspberries. Bipartisan has also carried pumpkin pie at Thanksgiving.

Bipartisan Cafe serves Water Avenue Coffee. The seasonal eggnog latte has been described as Bipartisan's "most anticipated holiday item".

== History ==
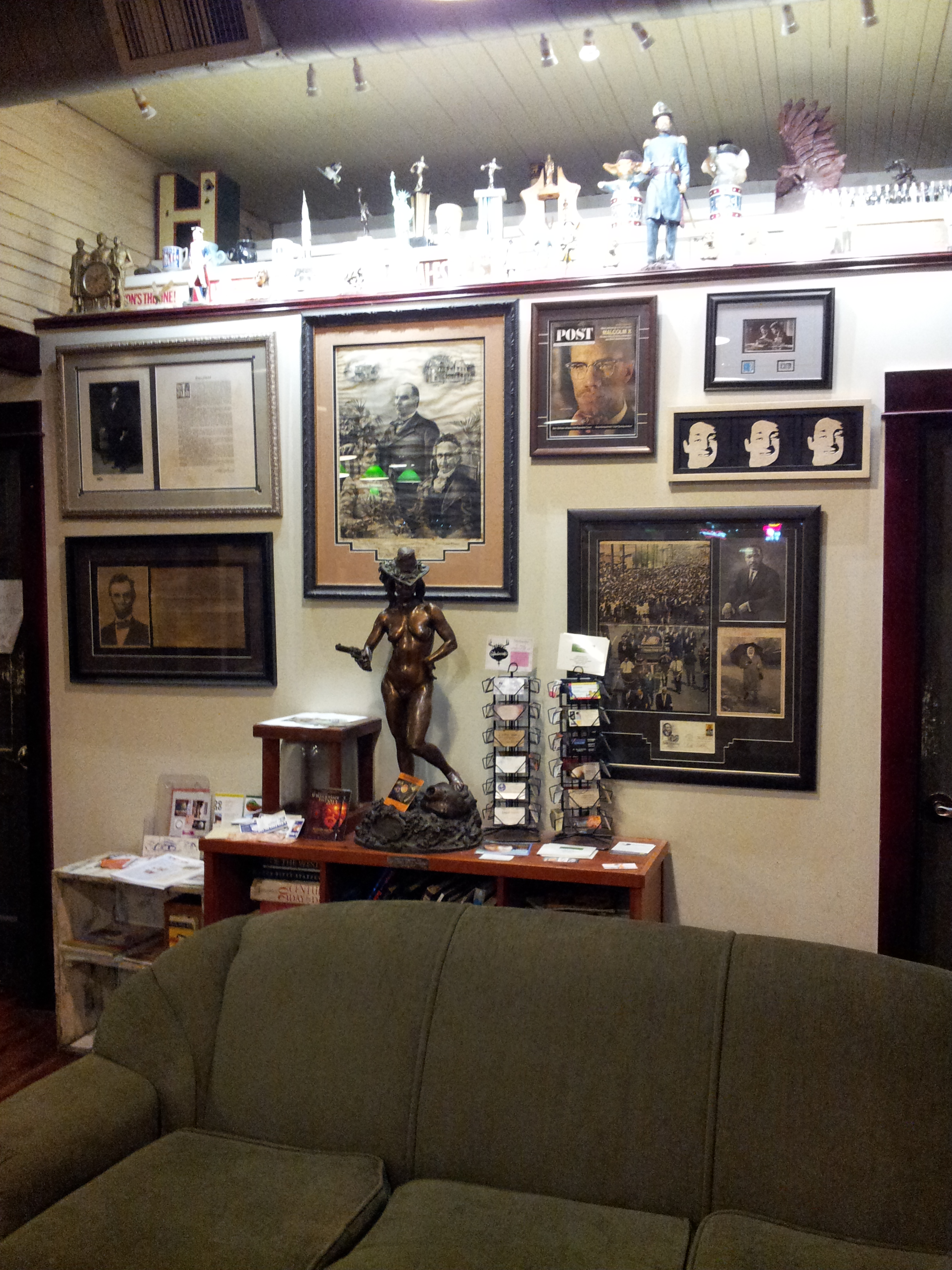
The cafe's interior, 2013

Hobie Bender and Peter Emerson opened Bipartisan Cafe in 2005. The business is housed in a space that previously accommodated a hardware store. Emerson has said he "wanted a place where there was political discourse and ... where you could have opposing views and have a civil conversation". Bipartisan has hosted political candidates for public office, including Ben Cannon in 2006, Jefferson Smith in 2012, Ted Wheeler in 2016, and Jo Ann Hardesty in 2018. The venue has also hosted viewing parties for political events, including acceptance speeches by John McCain and Barack Obama in 2008, President Obama's 2011 State of the Union Address, and the 2016 U.S. presidential election. For the 2008 viewing parties, Emerson displayed life-sized cutouts of Hillary Clinton, McCain, and Obama. Bipartisan Cafe has also hosted meetings for civic groups. In 2009, a group from City Club of Portland held a meeting about the 1980 Portland Comprehensive Plan that featured urban historian Carl Abbott and city planners as speakers.

In 2014, Emerson opposed Portland City Council member Steve Novick's proposal to set a street fee based on trip generation data; Emerson stated the proposal would place Bipartisan Cafe "in the same category as a global powerhouse". In 2015, Emerson supported a statewide paid sick leave bill, after initial skepticism. Emerson has expressed support for minimum wage increases. In 2016, Portland Tribune reported Bipartisan Cafe had 25 employees, the longest-tenured of whom were paid $10.50 an hour. The newspaper noted Emerson's desire to pay $15 per hour, which he said he was unable to offer because the restaurant operated "on a narrow 5 percent profit margin". To compensate, Emerson said he had hired more workers to reduce stress, provided free food to employees, and worked to accommodate staff members' schedule conflicts.

During the COVID-19 pandemic, Bipartisan Cafe operated a take-out window and raised funds via GoFundMe to stay solvent. As of February 2022, unvaccinated patrons could enter the restaurant for take-out orders but proof of vaccination was required for indoor dining for people aged 12 and older. In 2023, the business was sold to former employee Josh Pangelinan.

== Reception ==
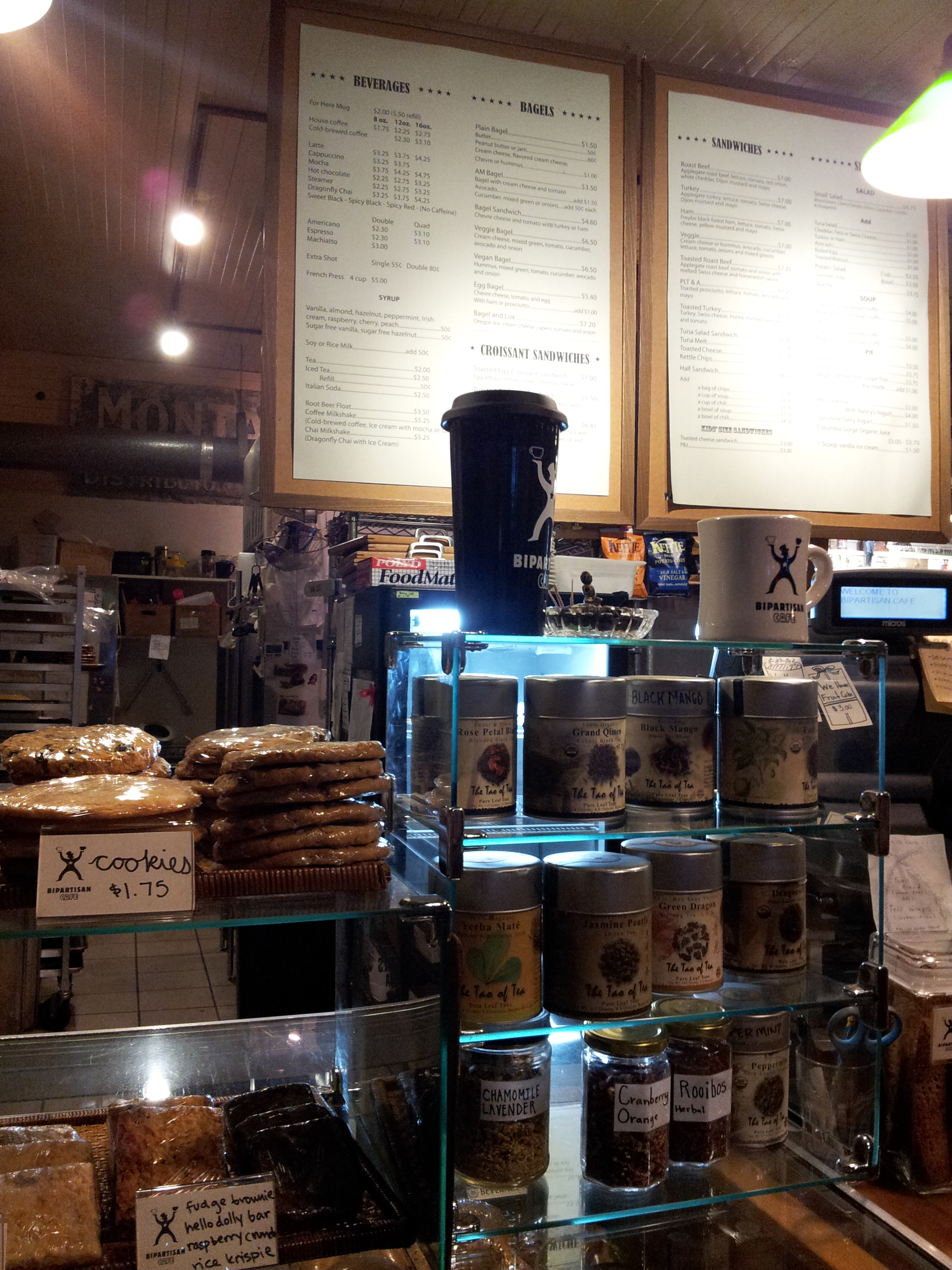
The cafe's interior, 2013

The book series Walking Portland (2012–2013) describes Bipartisan Cafe as a "stellar" family-friendly coffee shop with "fantastic" pies and pastries. Portland Monthly included Bipartisan Cafe in a 2013 overview of Portland's best pie shops. The magazine called the business the "unofficial community center" that "practically demands that you slow down and share a slice of pie and a steaming mug of Water Avenue Coffee with a friend". Portland Monthly also recommended the venue's espresso cream pie.

Nathan Skidmore included Bipartisan Cafe's cream pies in The Oregonian's 2008 overview of the best desserts in Portland. The same year, The Oregonian's Seth Lorinczi said "the pies are benchmark; the crust thin, flaky and unadorned, the fillings fresh and abundant". In 2010, S.J. Sebellin-Ross called the triple berry pie's filling "dull", and the crust "pale" and "overworked". Sebellin-Ross also called the curd in the marionberry lemon pie "cloyingly sweet", and the Chantilly cream "perfectly whipped and rich". Lizzy Acker ranked Bipartisan Cafe third in The Oregonian's 2018 list of the city's best chocolate cream pies and said the cafe's "chocolate cream had generally good texture, good flavor, but too much cream for many of the pie eaters, and a somewhat problematic crust". In 2023, the newspaper's Michael Russell said, "Before the rise of Lauretta Jean's, Random Order and Bipartisan Cafe were the go-to cafes for Portlanders seeking good pie." In 2010, Patrick Alan Coleman of Portland Mercury wrote: "The huge selection of pies is what makes this Montavilla hangout so popular for politicos of all stripes."

In 2008, Willamette Week included Bipartisan Cafe in an overview of the best places to drink coffee in Portland and said "the standout collection of political ephemera and housemade pies ... almost overshadow the perfect neighborliness" of the venue. In 2015, the newspaper's Jay Horton said the cafe "kickstarted Montavilla's rebirth with nationally acclaimed pies". In 2016, Penelope Bass called Bipartisan Cafe "a neighborhood pillar built of delicate, flaky crust ... where it's easy to while away a day among the neighborhood regulars". In 2020, Nina Silberstein of Southeast Examiner said the cafe "boasts the best homemade pies in Portland". In 2023, Jacob Loeb of Montavilla News said the business "helped launch the century-old downtown main street's resurrection, defining Montavilla, and has served as the community's living room for nearly two decades".

Cheryl Strayed recommend the "lovely" cafe's coffee and pie in her 2019 guide to Portland. Thrillist's Pete Cottell included Bipartisan Cafe in his 2020 list of Portland's best coffee shops with Wi-Fi. Eater Portland included Bipartisan Cafe in a 2017 list of 18 "hidden gem" restaurants in Portland. The same website's Michelle Lopez included the business in a 2022 overview of venues in which "legit" pies in Portland could be found, and writers included Bipartisan Cafe in Eater Portland's 2023 overview of recommended eateries in Montavilla. The cafe's marionberry pie was included in the American Automobile Association's 2022 list of the ten best regional Western dishes.

== See also ==
- List of bakeries
