= 35th People's Choice Awards =

Pop culture award show held in 2009

- Date: January 7, 2009
- Location: Shrine Auditorium, Los Angeles, California
- Hosted by: Queen Latifah

Television/radio coverage
- Network: CBS

The 35th People's Choice Awards, honoring the best in popular culture for 2008, was held on January 7, 2009 at the Shrine Auditorium in Los Angeles, California. They were hosted by Queen Latifah in her third straight year as host, and was broadcast on CBS. Performers for the show included Carrie Underwood and Rascal Flatts.

Due to the 35th anniversary of the People's Choice Awards and People Magazine, the two combined forces to create an award entitled "Favorite Star Under 35". The award was made for that one show and that show only. Multi-platinum singer, American Idol winner, and 5-time Grammy Award winner Carrie Underwood received the award based on the public's choice from an online poll.

== Nominations and winners ==
The nominees for the awards were selected with the help of E-Poll Market Research using what it describes as the People's Choice Online Community to achieve a nationally representative sample of respondents aged 13 or older. For each category, the respondents were provided with a set of candidates determined by national ratings averages, box-office grosses and music sales. The respondents then chose their favorites in Television, Movies and Music. They also had the option to write in their favorites where not included among the provided candidates. The top three selections in each category became the final nominees. Winners were chosen online by those who registered with the awards shows official website.

=== Awards ===
Winners are listed first in bold. Other nominees are in alphabetical order.

Favorite New TV Comedy	Favorite Song From A Soundtrack
**Gary Unmarried**; Kath & Kim; Worst Week	**"Mamma Mia" by Meryl Streep, Mamma Mia!**; "Another Way to Die" by Jack White & Alicia Keys, Quantum of Solace; "Labels or Love" by Fergie, Sex and the City
Favorite Movie Drama	Favorite Funny Male Star
**The Secret Life of Bees**; 21; Eagle Eye	**Adam Sandler**; Jim Carrey; Steve Carell
Favorite Male Action Star	Favorite Movie
**Will Smith**; Christian Bale; Robert Downey Jr.	**The Dark Knight**; Indiana Jones and the Kingdom of the Crystal Skull; Iron Man
Favorite Male TV Star	Favorite Pop Song
**Hugh Laurie**; Charlie Sheen; Patrick Dempsey	**"I Kissed a Girl" by Katy Perry**; "Disturbia" by Rihanna; "No Air" by Jordin Sparks ft. Chris Brown
Favorite Rock Song	Favorite Female Singer
**"All Summer Long" by Kid Rock**; "Apologize" by OneRepublic & Timbaland; "Viva la Vida" by Coldplay	**Carrie Underwood**; Alicia Keys; Rihanna
Favorite Male Movie Star	Favorite Male Singer
**Will Smith**; Harrison Ford; Robert Downey Jr.	**Chris Brown**; Brad Paisley; Kenny Chesney
Favorite TV Comedy	Favorite Funny Female Star
**Two and a Half Men**; Samantha Who?; Ugly Betty	**Tina Fey**; Ellen DeGeneres; Whoopi Goldberg
Favorite Family Movie	Favorite Female Movie Star
**WALL-E**; The Chronicles of Narnia: Prince Caspian; Kung Fu Panda	**Reese Witherspoon**; Angelina Jolie; Keira Knightley
Favorite Comedy Movie	Favorite TV Drama
**27 Dresses**; Get Smart; Mamma Mia!	**House**; CSI: Crime Scene Investigation; Grey's Anatomy
Favorite Group	Favorite Leading lady
**Rascal Flatts**; Coldplay; Maroon 5	**Kate Hudson**; Anne Hathaway; Queen Latifah
Favorite Female TV Star	Favorite Hip-Hop Song
**Christina Applegate**; Mariska Hargitay; Sally Field	**"Low" by Flo Rida f/T-Pain**; "Good Life" by Kanye West; "Lollipop" by Lil Wayne f/Static Major
Favorite Animated Comedy	Favorite Leading man
**The Simpsons**; Family Guy; South Park	**Brad Pitt**; Christian Bale; Mark Wahlberg
Favorite Country Song	Favorite Talk show Host
**"Last Name" by Carrie Underwood**; "Love Story" by Taylor Swift; "Take Me There" by Rascal Flatts	**Ellen DeGeneres**; David Letterman; Regis Philbin & Kelly Ripa
Favorite On Screen Match-Up	Favorite R&B Song
**Christian Bale & Heath Ledger, The Dark Knight**; Shia LaBeouf & Harrison Ford, Indiana Jones and the Kingdom of the Crystal Skull; Tina Fey & Amy Poehler, Baby Mama	**"No One" by Alicia Keys**; "Take a Bow" by Rihanna; "With You" by Chris Brown
Favorite Competition/Reality Show	Favorite Female Action Star
**Dancing with the Stars**; American Idol; Extreme Makeover: Home Edition	**Angelina Jolie**; Anne Hathaway; Cate Blanchett
Favorite New TV Drama	Favorite Cast
**The Mentalist**; 90210; Fringe	**The Dark Knight**; Mamma Mia!; Sex and the City
Favorite Scene Stealing Guest Star	Favorite Online Sensation
**Robin Williams on Law & Order: Special Victims Unit**; Britney Spears on How I Met Your Mother; Luke Perry on Law & Order: Special Victims Unit	**Dr. Horrible's Sing-Along Blog**; Dance Battle 2; Kobe Bryant Attempts Massive Stunt; Paris Hilton Responds to McCain Ad; Pork and Beans
Favorite User-Generated Video	Favorite TV Drama Diva
**Barack Roll**; Fred Goes Swimming; "Star Wars" A Cappella Tribute; Wassup 2008; Where the Hell is Matt (2008)	**Kyra Sedgwick (The Closer)**; Holly Hunter (Saving Grace); Mary-Louise Parker (Weeds)
Favorite Game Show	Favorite Independent Movie
**Deal or No Deal**; Are You Smarter than a 5th Grader?; Jeopardy!	**The Secret Life of Bees**; The Duchess; Miss Pettigrew Lives for a Day
Favorite Sci Fi/Fantasy Show	Favorite Superhero
**Heroes**; Supernatural; Terminator: The Sarah Connor Chronicles	**Christian Bale as Bruce Wayne/Batman**; Robert Downey Jr. as Tony Stark/Iron Man; Will Smith as John Hancock
Favorite Combined Forces
**"No Air" by Jordin Sparks f/Chris Brown**; "4 Minutes" by Madonna f/Justin Timberlake; "Love Like This" by Natasha Bedingfield f/Sean Kingston

== Favorite Star Under 35 ==
This special category was added into the 35th Annual Award show only, because both the People's Choice and People Magazine were both celebrating their 35th anniversary. This was a one-time award, so the current title-holder (Carrie Underwood) will be the only title-holder.

- Amy Adams
- Drew Barrymore
- Beyoncé
- Orlando Bloom
- Chris Brown
- Chace Crawford
- Miley Cyrus
- Leonardo DiCaprio
- Zac Efron
- America Ferrera
- Ryan Gosling
- Jake Gyllenhaal
- Anne Hathaway
- Scarlett Johansson
- Angelina Jolie
- Alicia Keys
- Keira Knightley
- John Krasinski
- Shia LaBeouf
- Blake Lively
- John Mayer
- Eva Mendes
- Daniel Radcliffe
- Rihanna
- Jordin Sparks
- Taylor Swift
- Justin Timberlake
- Carrie Underwood
- Usher
- Milo Ventimiglia
- Pete Wentz
- Kanye West
- Reese Witherspoon
