= Eileen Brady =

American businesswoman (born 1961)

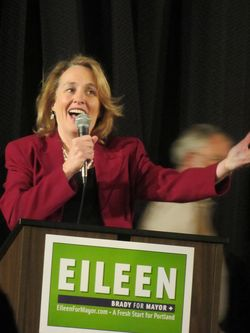
- Born: 1961 (age 64–65); Chicago, Illinois
- Education: Evergreen State College
- Occupation: Businesswoman
- Spouse: Brian Rohter
- Website: eileenformayor.com

Eileen Brady (born 1961) is an American businesswoman who ran unsuccessfully for mayor of Portland, Oregon, in 2012.

== Early life and career ==
Born in Chicago, Brady was the eldest of five children born to Charles, an attorney and businessman, and Susanne Brady, a Democratic community activist who served on the Evanston city council. Brady graduated from Evanston Township High School and then attended one year at Hampshire College. Along with several other students, she staged an anti-nuclear demonstration at The Pentagon, where she was arrested for damaging federal property and served 14 days in jail. Following her release, she enrolled at Evergreen State College in Olympia, Washington, from which she would eventually graduate. In 1983, Brady married Tim O'Connor with whom she had two children.

== Move to Portland ==
In 1986, Brady and her family moved to Portland, Oregon, where she and O'Connor both got jobs at Nature's Fresh Northwest, an organic grocery store, where she worked in several different jobs within the company. She and O'Connor divorced in the mid-1990s. She married Brian Rohter, another Nature's employee, in 1997.

In 1995, Brady left Nature's and worked for several technology companies, eventually becoming a vice president at @Once, an email marketing company, in 1999. Brady is generally regarded as a co-founder of the Portland-based grocery chain New Seasons Market, although one other co-founder disputes this claim. Brady did not serve as an employee of the chain, which now has 18 stores, but claims to have helped develop its model: blending organic foods with conventional brands on the shelves. In 2001, she joined Ecotrust as vice president of marketing and information services. She left the company in 2005.

== Political career ==
In 2007, Governor Ted Kulongoski appointed her to the Oregon Health Fund Board, a panel created by the Oregon state legislature to develop reforms to Oregon's health care system. One panel proposal resulted in legislation that added health care for 85,000 children in the state in 2009.

She considered a run for U.S. Senate in 2008, but decided against it. She competed in the 2012 election for mayor of Portland and finished second runner-up.
