= KUIK =

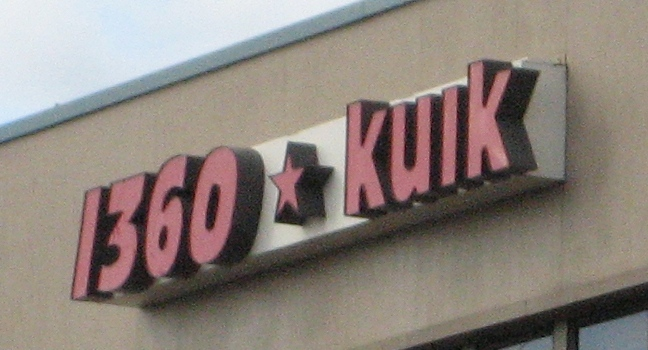
- Hillsboro, Oregon; United States
- Broadcast area: Portland, Oregon
- Frequency: 1360 kHz

Programming
- Format: Defunct

Ownership
- Owner: Jefferson Smith; (Flying Ant, LLC)

History
- First air date: October 29, 1954 (as KRTV)
- Last air date: April 7, 2022
- Former call signs: KRTV (1954–1957)

Technical information
- Licensing authority: FCC
- Facility ID: 17063
- Class: B
- Power: 5,000 watts
- Transmitter coordinates: 45°29′12.4″N 122°54′35.4″W

Links
- Public license information: Public file; LMS

KUIK (1360 AM) was a radio station licensed to Hillsboro, Oregon. Its license was owned by Jefferson Smith's Flying Ant, LLC. The station operated from 1954 to 2022.

== History ==
KUIK first went on the air in 1954 from a transmitter site on Oregon Route 219 just south of downtown Hillsboro, Oregon, and offices and studios on the second floor of a building on SE 2nd St., just south of the Washington County Courthouse. It changed ownership percentages several times until purchased by Don McCoun, who moved the studios and offices to the same location as the original transmitter site. Later, the station moved to a facility in the Hillsboro Airport terminal, with the transmitter located east of the city when it added nighttime operation. Don McCoun purchased the station in 1978, and operated it until selling it in 2005 to Spencer Rubin. McCoun stayed on as a show host, and resumed ownership of KUIK in 2012.

On March 22, 2018, KUIK announced that it would leave the air on March 31, with new ownership taking over the station the following day. The new owners intended to relaunch the station with a new format in May 2018. However, for unknown reasons the station was not relaunched in May 2018. The transfer of license from Dolphin Radio LLC to Flying Ant, LLC was consummated on December 14, 2018. Flying Ant was owned by politician Jefferson Smith.

On April 7, 2022, KUIK turned off the transmitter, and took down their towers. The Federal Communications Commission cancelled the station's license on September 3, 2026, as it had been off the air for over a year.

== Programming ==
The station carried nationally syndicated talk-show hosts Laura Ingraham and Dennis Prager, in addition to locally originated news and talk programming. KUIK also aired local high-school sports, San Francisco 49ers football, San Francisco Giants baseball and NASCAR racing events. KUIK served Washington County, which includes the cities and communities of Hillsboro, Beaverton, Aloha, Tigard, Tualatin, Sherwood, Wilsonville, Forest Grove and Banks.

KUIK carried Oregon Ducks baseball and women's basketball as a member of the Oregon Sports Network.
