= Joe Smith (Oregon politician) =

American politician

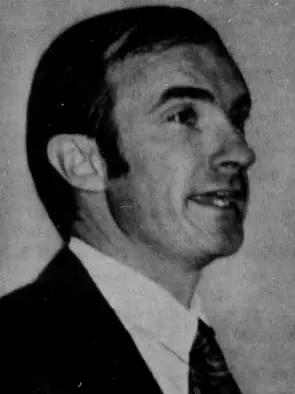
- Smith in 1972

Chairman of the Democratic Party of Oregon
- In office 1980–1982

Member of the Oregon House of Representatives
- In office 2004–2004
- Preceded by: Deborah Kafoury

Personal details
- Born: Raoul Pingree Smith; May 17, 1935 Salt Lake City, Utah, U.S.
- Died: June 30, 2026 (aged 91)
- Party: Democratic
- Spouse: Marjorie Burns
- Children: 4; including Jefferson
- Parent: Joseph Fielding Smith (father)
- Education: University of Utah; George Washington University Law School

Raoul Pingree Smith (May 17, 1935 – June 30, 2026) was an American politician. A member of the Democratic Party, he served as chairman of the Democratic Party of Oregon from 1980 to 1982 and in the Oregon House of Representatives in 2004.

== Early life and career ==
Smith was born in Salt Lake City, Utah, the son of Joseph, a speech professor, and Ruth, an English teacher. He attended the University of Utah and graduated from the George Washington University Law School. After graduating, he worked as a district attorney in Umatilla County, Oregon. In 1972, he ran as a Democratic candidate for attorney general of Oregon. He received 440,648 votes, but lost to Republican incumbent Lee Johnson, who won with 456,949 votes.

Smith served as chairman of the Democratic Party of Oregon from 1980 to 1982. After his service as chairman, he served in the Oregon House of Representatives in 2004, succeeding Deborah Kafoury.

== Personal life and death ==
Smith was married to Marjorie Burns. Their marriage lasted until Smith's death in 2026. He had four children, including Jefferson, an Oregon representative.

Smith died on June 30, 2026, at the age of 91.
