= Rickrolling =

Internet meme and prank

The first seconds of the "Never Gonna Give You Up" music video

"Never Gonna Give You Up"
Opening of "Never Gonna Give You Up"

Rickrolling (Note: Also written as rick-roll or Rick Roll, used as a noun or verb) is an Internet meme and prank involving the unexpected appearance of the music video for the 1987 hit song "Never Gonna Give You Up", performed by the English singer Rick Astley. The meme is a type of bait and switch and commonly uses a disguised hyperlink that leads to the music video instead of what was expected. The meme has also extended to using the song's lyrics in unexpected contexts or singing it during public events. After the origin of the meme in 2007 and the height of its popularity in 2008, rickrolling has become a very long-lived meme. Astley has seen his performance career revitalised by the meme's popularity.

The meme grew out of a similar bait-and-switch trick called "duckrolling" that was popular on the website 4chan in 2006. Rickrolling originated on 15 May 2007, when 4chan user Shawn Cotter uploaded the "Never Gonna Give You Up" music video to YouTube and linked to it in place of the trailer for the video game Grand Theft Auto IV. It quickly became popular and spread to other Internet sites later that year.

The meme gained mainstream attention in 2008 through several events, beginning with a campaign by the hacker group Anonymous to protest the Church of Scientology through rickrolling. Awareness of rickrolling increased after two events in April 2008: YouTube used the meme for its April Fools' Day event, and users of several websites voted for "Never Gonna Give You Up" in a poll for the New York Mets' rally song. The meme inspired videos remixing "Never Gonna Give You Up", including "BarackRoll", which combined the song with footage of United States presidential candidate Barack Obama. Astley was initially hesitant about using the meme to further his career; he declined to appear at the 2008 MTV Europe Music Awards, in which an online vote had named him "Best Act Ever". He accepted the publicity by rickrolling the 2008 Macy's Thanksgiving Day Parade—seen by millions of television viewers—with a surprise performance of the song on the Foster's Home for Imaginary Friends float.

Use of rickrolling peaked in 2008, but it remained popular. Later perpetrators of the prank included United States Representative Nancy Pelosi in 2009, members of the Oregon Legislative Assembly in 2010, and the Twitter account of the White House in 2011. Anonymous again used rickrolling as a tactic against the Islamic State of Iraq and Syria in 2015. The rock band Foo Fighters featured surprise appearances by Astley to rickroll audiences in 2017, having previously used the meme to protest the Westboro Baptist Church. The prank was also conducted by sports stadiums, including that of the San Diego Padres in 2019. Rickrolling resurged in popularity during the COVID-19 pandemic. By 2021, the official YouTube video of "Never Gonna Give You Up"—one of several uploads used for rickrolling—had been viewed over one billion times.

== History ==
=== Background ===
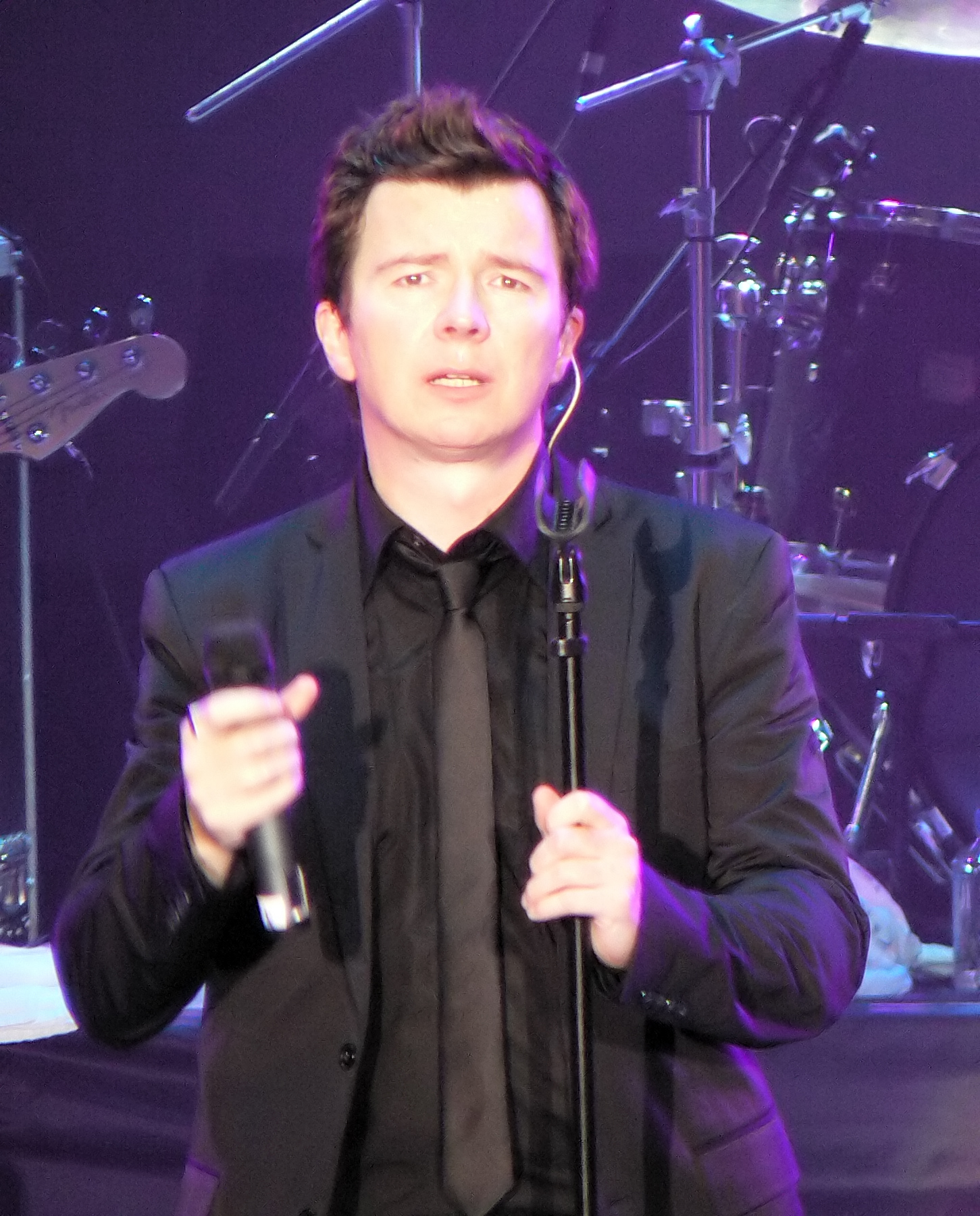
Rick Astley performing in 2008

"Never Gonna Give You Up" is a song written by songwriting trio Stock Aitken Waterman and recorded by English singer Rick Astley. It appeared on his 1987 debut album Whenever You Need Somebody and was released as a single on 27 July of that year. It was a number-one hit on several charts, including the Billboard Hot 100 in the US, the ARIA Charts in Australia, and the UK Singles Chart, becoming the most popular single of the year in the UK. It is a dance-pop song with heavy use of synthesizers, catchy music, and repetitive lyrics sung in a baritone voice. It begins with a distinctive drum riff and a synthesizer melody, followed by the lines, "We're no strangers to love / You know the rules and so do I". The accompanying music video, Astley's first, was made in a single week, and Astley brought his own outfits. It features 21-year-old Astley performing the song while awkwardly dancing, wearing a trenchcoat and a coiffed hairstyle, alongside backup dancers wearing spandex and a bartender doing backflips.

The song faded from popularity, being a common song on the radio for only about a year. It also received disapproval—with the television network VH1 listing it as one of the "50 Most Awesomely Bad Songs"—and its style fell out of fashion. The song's reputation was influenced by its 1980s-style composition, its unpolished music video, and a perceived incongruity between Astley's youthful appearance and his low-pitched vocals. "Never Gonna Give You Up" was Astley's most successful song; it was one of two, alongside "Together Forever", to reach number one on the Billboard chart. Astley initially retired in 1994, at the age of 28, as he wanted more time with his family. He returned to touring in 2004 to mild success.

Internet memes originated in the 1990s, when they mostly involved humorous images. Video-based memes, such as viral videos, became popular in the 2000s as technology improved. Many memes originated on the imageboard website 4chan, which was also the origin of the hacker group Anonymous. On several websites, beginning in the late 1990s, users frequently posted bait-and-switch links that trolled readers by redirecting them to unexpected targets. These links often led to shock sites, which contained disturbing or graphic imagery. Trolling and bait-and-switch humour were popular on 4chan. Internet scholar Lee Knuttila wrote that bait-and-switch humour was a simple, fundamental element of the subculture of 4chan. According to Know Your Meme editor-in-chief Don Caldwell, rickrolling was the first bait-and-switch meme to gain mainstream popularity.

Pre-dating the first rickroll, in August 2005, the sitcom It's Always Sunny In Philadelphia featured "Never Gonna Give You Up". In the episode "Charlie Has Cancer", the character Dennis sings along to the song in his car. Another precursor of rickrolling occurred in 2006, when rural Michigan resident Erik Helwig called in to a local radio sports talk show and, instead of conversing with the DJs, played "Never Gonna Give You Up". Caldwell said there was no confirmation of whether it had inspired the 4chan use of the song, and Helwig said he did not claim to be the "founder" of the meme. YouTuber Harrison Renshaw listed both Helwig and It's Always Sunny in Philadelphia as contributors to the popularity of the rickroll.

=== Origin ===
The "duckroll" image was used in bait-and-switch pranks among 4chan users in 2006, making it the predecessor to rickrolling.

The use of "Never Gonna Give You Up" for rickrolling originated on 4chan. It was based on an earlier meme on the website known as "duckrolling", which originated in 2006. That year, the site's moderator, Christopher "moot" Poole, implemented a word filter replacing the word egg with duck as a gag. On one thread, where eggroll had become duckroll, an anonymous user posted an edited image of a duck with wheels. (Note: The American Dialect Society cites duckroll as the origin of the word rickroll, but gives a different etymology from the use of the verb roll to mean 'misdirect';) According to video game historian Kate Willært, this image had been created in April 2005 by Gaming-Age Forums user Christian "ferricide" Nutt, inspired by a fellow user of the forums known as Duckroll. The image caught on across 4chan, becoming the target of a hyperlink with an otherwise interesting title, with a user clicking through being said to be "duckrolled".

In March 2007, Rockstar Games released the first trailer for the highly anticipated Grand Theft Auto IV. Viewership was so high that it crashed Rockstar's site. Several Internet users helped to post mirrors of the video on different sites, but one 4chan user linked to the "Never Gonna Give You Up" video on YouTube claiming to be the trailer, tricking numerous readers. Under the YouTube username cotter548, he uploaded the video, titled "Rickroll'D", on 15 May. The uploader was nineteen-year-old Shawn Cotter, a United States Air Force airman in South Korea; he publicly revealed his identity in an "ask me anything" post on Reddit in 2011, describing himself as "the one who inadvertently became the biggest troll on the internet". In a 2022 interview with Vice Media, he said the reason of using "Never Gonna Give You Up" was because he had found an online list about songs that were popular in 1987, the year of his birth; he found the video funny and wanted it to be a meme. Cotter is generally agreed to be the originator of the rickroll.

The practice of rickrolling became popular within a few days and replaced duckrolling with links pointing to Astley's video. The term began showing up in Google search data the same month. Rickrolling became popular on YouTube, with videos featuring people lip-syncing to the song or rickrolling public events, as well as mashup videos. Many videos used the phrase, "You've been RickRolled." The trend contributed to sales of "Never Gonna Give You Up"—beginning in late December 2007, it received over 1,000 downloads per week, reaching a peak of 2,500 in the week of 9 March 2008. Participants in the meme were too young to remember the original song.

Astley first became aware of rickrolling when he fell for the prank through a series of emails from a US-based friend during the early days of the phenomenon. Astley was on vacation and was confused until he called the friend, who explained the meme.

=== Growth in 2008 ===
==== Rickroll against Scientology and early mainstream coverage ====
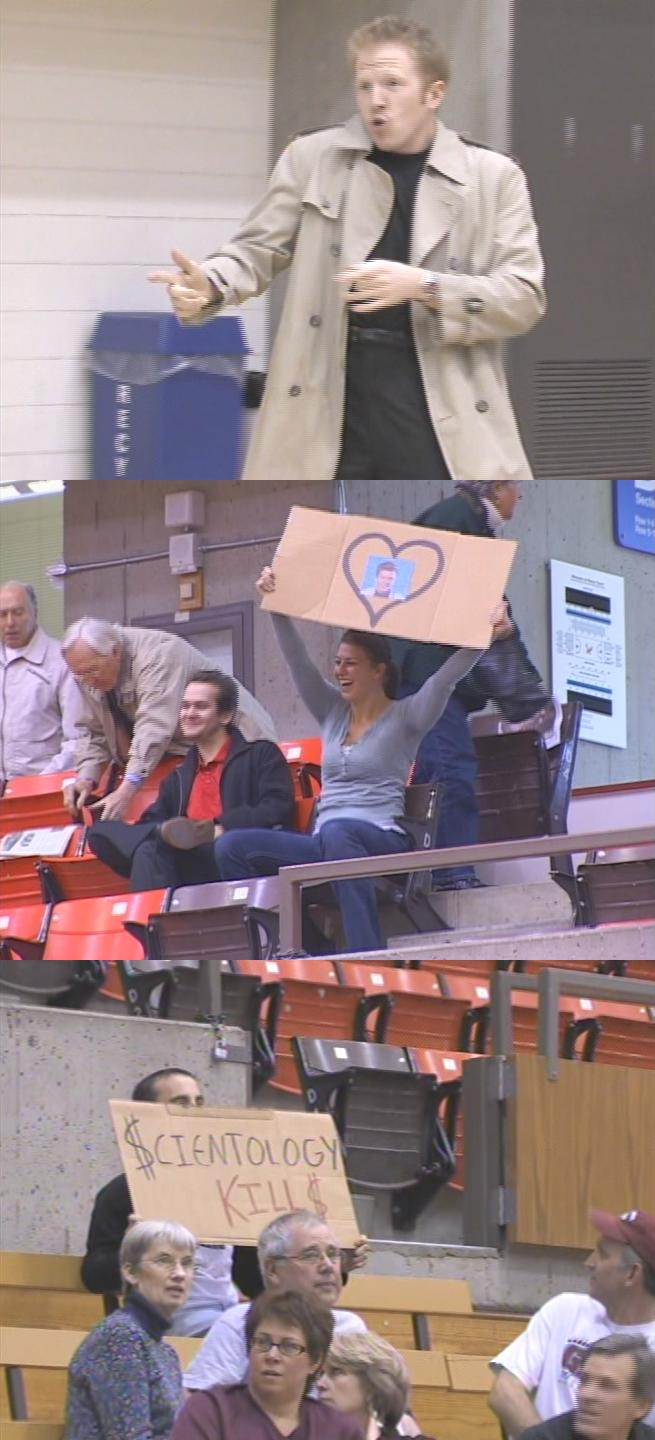
Scenes from the March 2008 video of rickrolling at Eastern Washington University basketball games

The first rickroll to gain mainstream attention, in February 2008, targeted the Church of Scientology, which had been aggressively trying to remove videos critical of the church. The group Anonymous, as part of their Project Chanology to challenge these actions, protested at the Church's various headquarters by chanting "Never Gonna Give You Up" and playing it on boomboxes. Several YouTube videos documented these events, including one in which the rickroller falsely described Astley as "some dead guy". Members of Anonymous also created a website that mimicked the URL of a Scientologist website denouncing Anonymous, instead playing a rickroll.

In March 2008, two employees of the athletics department of Eastern Washington University, Pawl Fisher and Davin Perry, rickrolled a number of games by the collegiate basketball team. These performances had Perry dressing up as Astley from the video and lip-syncing to the music as a prank before the start of the game. Fisher filmed and edited these into a YouTube video that made it appear as a single rickroll interrupting a game. After the video received millions of views, it was covered by local television station KHQ-TV as well as The New York Times. Fisher pranked New York Times reporter Evelyn Nussenbaum by claiming the video was a single, unedited rickroll; the newspaper published a retraction after KHQ reported that this was false.

Popular blogs such as Gizmodo, Slashdot, and Boing Boing introduced the meme to larger audiences. Various Youtube uploads of the music video collectively reached 25 million views by April 2008, one of which, linked from the webpage yougotrickrolled.com, had 7 million views. Internet users also created lists of rickroll URLs, browser plugins that claimed to block rickrolls but actually caused them, and a Wikipedia article about the phenomenon. As potential victims of rickrolling began to suspect links, pranksters began to hide rickrolls within more complex videos, such as edited versions of scenes from popular media. The band Radiohead posted a rickroll claiming to be a download of their new album, In Rainbows, in March 2008.

Astley first publicly spoke about rickrolling in a March 2008 interview with the Los Angeles Times, titled "Never Gonna Give You Up, Rick Astley", in which he said:

I think it's just one of those odd things where something gets picked up and people run with it. But that is what's brilliant about the Internet.
...
If this had happened around some kind of rock song, with a lyric that really meant something—a Bruce Springsteen [song], "God Bless America", or an anti-something kind of song, I could kind of understand that. But for something as—and I don't mean to belittle it, because I still think it's a great pop song—but it's a pop song, do you know what I mean? It doesn't have any kind of weight behind it, as such. But maybe that's the irony of it.

— Rick Astley, Los Angeles Times, "Never Gonna Give You Up, Rick Astley"

Astley also said in the interview that he was not troubled by the phenomenon, stating that he found it "bizarre" and "weird", since he had not performed much lately, but he found the interest funny. The following month, a spokesperson for Astley's record label released a comment that stated, "I'm sorry, but he's done talking about Rickrolling". Despite this, the meme revived his career, and he continued to be asked about it years later. Astley overcame his initial annoyance about rickrolling after speaking with his daughter, who thought it was cool and told him that the joke was not about him.

==== April 2008 peak ====
In a 2008 April Fools' joke, YouTube made all links to videos on the site's home page end up on the "Never Gonna Give You Up" music video. The coordinators of the prank had contacted Astley's record label, Sony BMG, (Note: "Never Gonna Give You Up" had been published by RCA Records, which later merged with Sony.) which had made its music available on the website two years earlier; according to label executive Sam Gomez, Astley had liked the idea. YouTube was one of several websites to independently pull such a prank that day, along with Sports Illustrated and LiveJournal. On that day, the YouTube video received 6.6 million views and 43,000 comments, while the song became the 77th most popular listing on Amazon Music. April Fools' Day strongly contributed to the meme's popularity.

The following week, the New York Mets baseball team asked fans on the Internet to choose their seventh-inning rally song for the upcoming season. "Never Gonna Give You Up" received five million write-in votes, driven by websites like YouTube and news aggregators Fark and Digg. The team considered the online vote hijacked and replaced it with an audience vote of the six most-voted songs during the first game of the season; the audience booed in response to "Never Gonna Give You Up".

Rickrolling gained further mainstream awareness after the Mets event, with a SurveyUSA poll the same month estimating that at least 18 million US adults had been rickrolled, based on a sample of 959. Google Trends showed that the highest volume of searches about rickrolling occurred that month. By this time, "Never Gonna Give You Up" became one of the biggest viral videos or memes, with many online creators attempting to outdo other rickrolls. As the meme received mainstream media coverage, some people within the online subculture considered it to be the end of rickrolling. For example, moot was quoted by FOX News as saying that he was "very surprised" at the prank's use by mainstream websites and that he expected the meme to fade soon.

A flash mob performed a rickroll at Liverpool Street Station, London, in April 2008. Another flash mob performed a rickroll in Baltimore the following month, organised by Facebook user Ryan Goff, which received coverage in The Baltimore Sun.

==== Further recognition, "BarackRoll" videos, and Astley parade appearance ====
External videos
- "BarackRoll" videos by Hugh Atkin (2008)
- BarackRoll
- John McCain Gets BarackRoll'd

Videos adapting the rickroll meme were popular during the 2008 United States presidential election between Barack Obama and John McCain. An August 2008 YouTube video by Hugh Atkin, titled "BarackRoll", was a mashup consisting of footage of Obama dancing on The Ellen DeGeneres Show, paired with words spoken by Obama spliced to match the lyrics of "Never Gonna Give You Up". The video was acknowledged by The Ellen DeGeneres Show and by Astley, who called it his favourite use of the meme. Atkin also made a sequel titled, "John McCain Gets BarackRoll'd", using footage of a speech by McCain, with "BarackRoll" edited onto a screen behind him while he stays silent. According to media scholar Carol Vernallis, the two "BarackRoll" videos reflect the popular conceptions of the two candidates: Obama is portrayed as a skilled singer who will "never give up", and a parallel is drawn between him and Astley as both appealed to both Black and White people, while McCain appears dull in contrast. "BarackRoll" followed a format of "Never Gonna Give You Up" mashup videos that used the word "roll" in the title to transparently indicate the connection to rickrolling. A similar video spliced clips from the series Mad Men to match the song.

At the 2008 MTV Europe Music Awards in November 2008, Astley was nominated for "Best Act Ever" after the online nomination form was flooded with votes. Despite not being on the original shortlist of nominees, Astley won with one hundred million votes—more than all other votes combined—effectively rickrolling the awards. Astley chose not to attend the ceremony, instead making a statement saying, "This is the first time I have been nominated for the EMAs and I would like to thank everyone who voted for me". Astley stated in an interview that he felt the award was "daft", but noted that "MTV were thoroughly rickrolled". An MTV executive also said, "We've been well and truly Rickrolled".

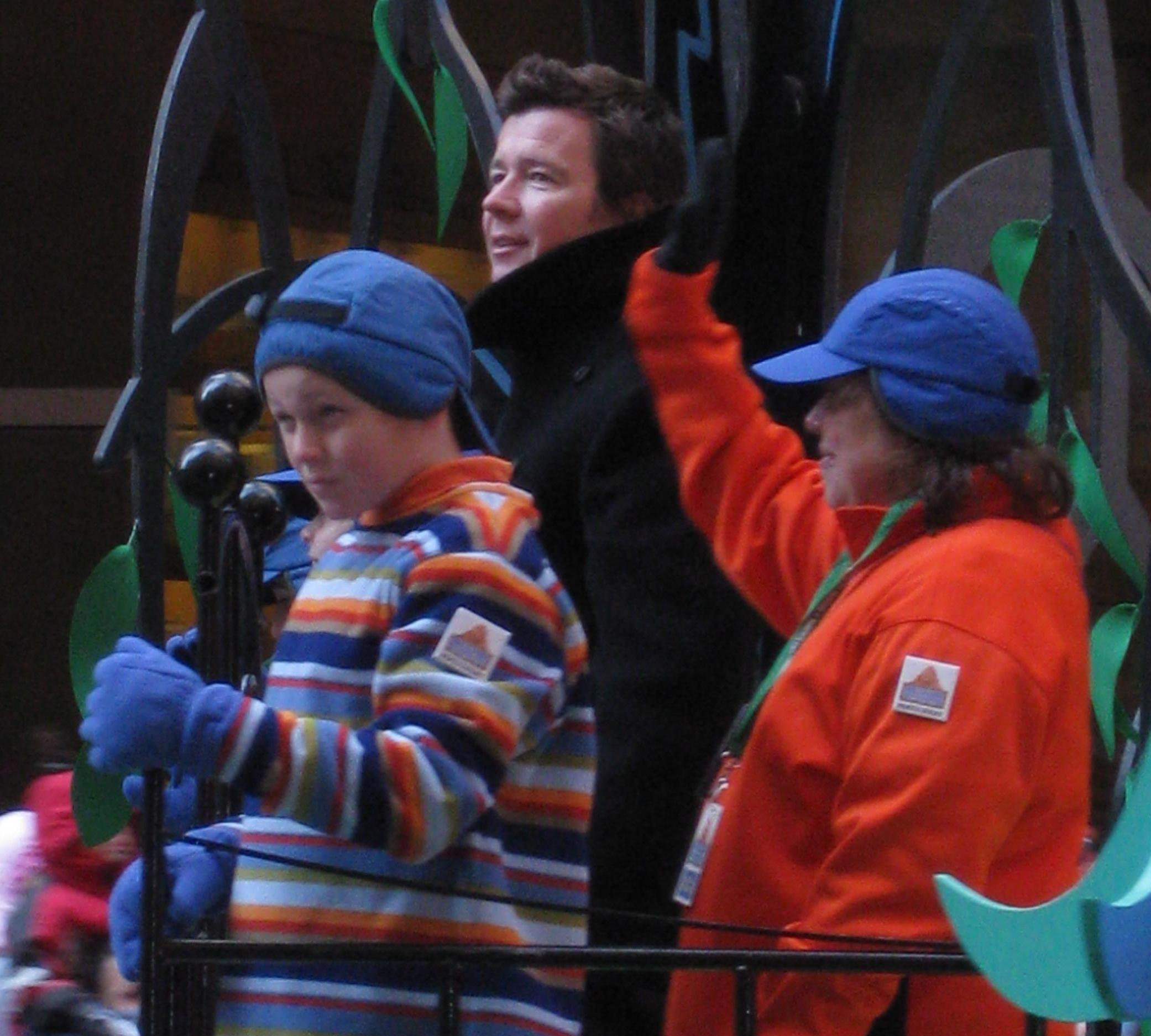
Astley performing the song during the 2008 Macy's Thanksgiving Day Parade

By November 2008, the "Never Gonna Give You Up" video on YouTube had more than 20 million views. Astley initially appeared indifferent to the newfound fame and was wary of trying to promote himself using the popularity of the meme. However, he agreed to make an appearance at the 2008 Macy's Thanksgiving Day Parade because Cartoon Network offered him a considerable payment for his performance and because his friends in America urged him to accept. Astley made a surprise appearance on a float of the Cartoon Network show Foster's Home for Imaginary Friends. After the puppets singing on the float were cut off by a record scratch, Astley joined to lip-sync the song to the crowd and millions of television viewers, with a puppet saying, "I love rickrolling!" According to design scholar Ursula Murray Husted, viewers unfamiliar with rickrolling would have considered it an ordinary parade appearance before the term "rickroll" was spoken. That performance was the largest rickroll yet. It went viral on social media within minutes. The Daily Telegraph wrote that this appearance was "the pinnacle of Rickrolling" and "may have been the most widely-seen Rickroll ever".

The Macy's parade made rickrolling more of a mainstream phenomenon and led many 4chan users to lose interest in it, feeling the joke had been exhausted. It led to a wave of rickrolls outside of the Internet, including on radio and television. Two weeks after the parade, a user of the message board I Love Music, Grady Gillian, rickrolled other users with a file that appeared to be a leak of the upcoming Animal Collective album Merriweather Post Pavilion until played; viewers responded with both praise and harassment. When the United States Congress launched its YouTube account in January 2009, it posted a video of cats in the office of Representative Nancy Pelosi, which turned into a rickroll. The video was intended to promote the channel and was part of Pelosi's targeting of Internet users. Also in 2009, students at the Massachusetts Institute of Technology conducted a rickroll by painting sheet music on a university building.

=== Enduring popularity ===
==== Post-peak usage ====
Rickrolling continued to be popular after its peak in 2008, lasting much longer than other memes. In 2009, Astley wrote about 4chan founder moot for Time magazine's annual Time 100 issue, thanking him for the rickrolling phenomenon. Moot also acknowledged rickrolling in a 2010 TED Talk, saying it had revived interest in Astley. Although "Never Gonna Give You Up" had received hundreds of millions of views on YouTube as a result of the meme, one of the song's writers, Pete Waterman, said in April 2009 that he had received only £11 (equivalent to £16 in 2025). According to The Register, as of 2010, Astley had directly received only US$12 ($17 in 2025) in performance royalties from YouTube; Astley did not compose the song and received only a performer's share of the sound recording copyright.

Avatar of The White House

The White House
Twitter
@whitehouse

Sorry to hear that. Fiscal policy is important, but can be dry sometimes. here's something more fun:

https://tinyurl.com/y8ufsnp #WHChat

27 July 2011

David Wiggs	Twitter
@wiggsd

This WH correspondence briefing isn't nearly as entertaining as yesterday's. #TCOT #WHchat

27 July 2011

After the cultural saturation of rickrolling, it continued to be recognised positively. University of Oregon-based a cappella group On The Rocks posted a video of themselves singing "Never Gonna Give You Up" on the New York City Subway in March 2010; the video went viral and brought fame to the group. The same month, members of the Oregon state legislature, spearheaded by Jefferson Smith of the legislature's lower house, slipped snippets of the song's lyrics into speeches they gave in 2011. Smith stitched together a video compilation of these snippets into the full song, posted on April Fools' Day. On 27 July 2011, the Twitter account of the White House, during a chat session run by staffer Brian Deese, posted a rickroll link in response to a user who had criticised the dull tone of the session's posts. The White House's rickroll contributed to the popularity of the meme.

In 2015, members of Anonymous began rickrolling the Islamic State of Iraq and Syria (ISIS) by hacking into websites used to promote the group and spamming related hashtags. Reporter James Geddes wrote, "Until now, Rickrolling has generally been used as a harmless internet prank, but now it's being used in a war that has much bigger stakes," while reporter Corey Charlton wrote that the prank was "giving ISIS a taste of its own medicine", as the group used social media tactics to unexpectedly spread its propaganda.

Rickrolls continued to occur years after the meme's popularity had declined. Apple rickrolled consumers in 2015 by showing them the song's lyrics when they viewed the Apple Watch help page. At the 2016 Republican National Convention, Melania Trump, campaigning for her husband Donald Trump, said, "He will never, ever give up and ... never, ever let you down," which many viewers considered a rickroll. Speaking with The New Yorker, Astley said he found it plausible that the rickroll was intentional. Australia's ABC News later called this "the biggest political rickroll".

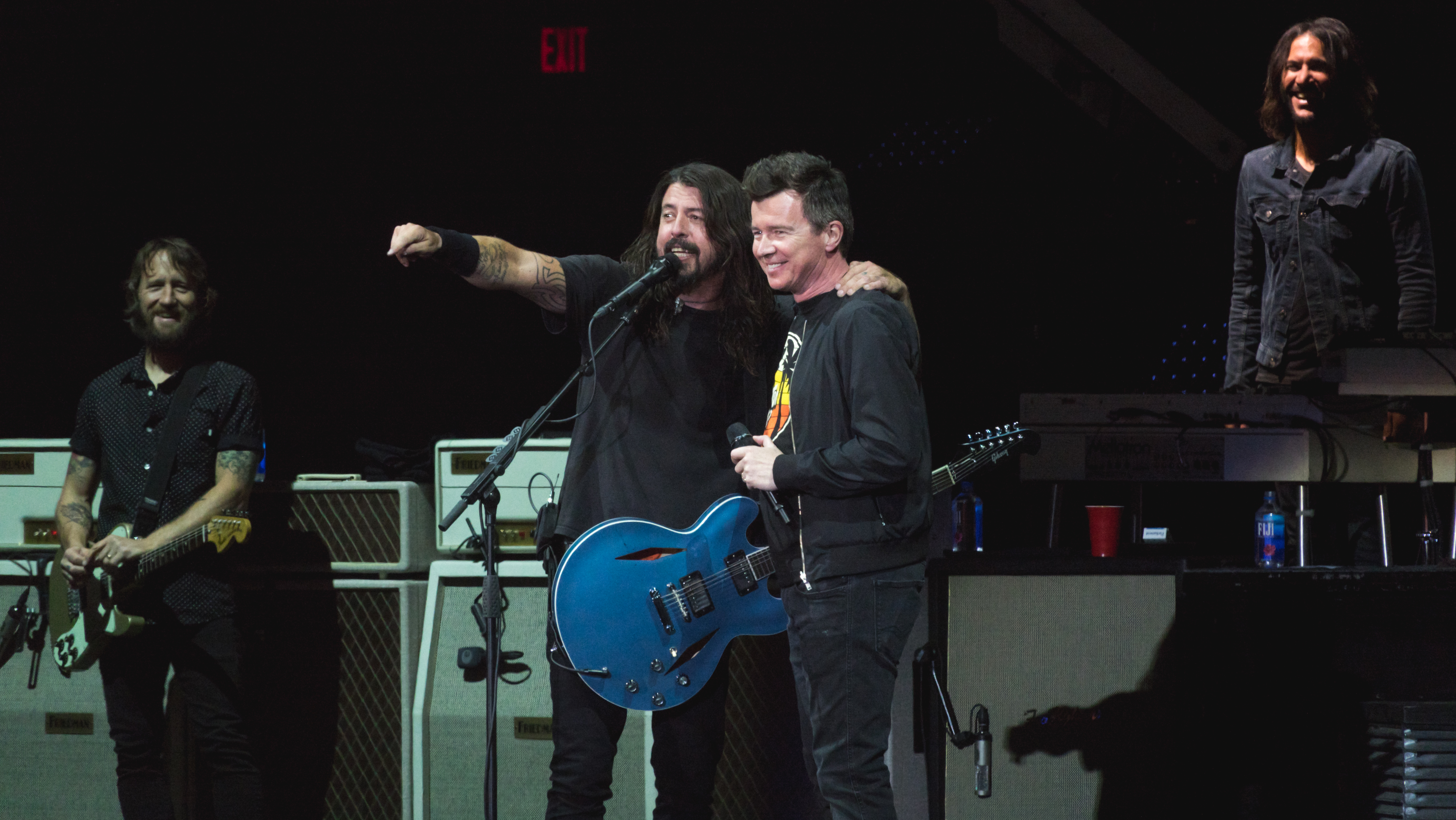
Astley with the Foo Fighters in 2017

The rock band Foo Fighters first performed a rickroll at an August 2015 concert in Kansas City, Missouri, using a truck to counterprotest a demonstration by the homophobic group Westboro Baptist Church. This mirrored the tactic used by Anonymous against Scientology. In 2017, the Foo Fighters brought Astley on stage to rickroll the audience of a concert at the Summer Sonic Festival in Tokyo, mashing up "Never Gonna Give You Up" with "Smells Like Teen Spirit". As Astley recounted in his memoir, this performance had been unplanned as Astley, also performing at the festival, had been watching the Foo Fighters from backstage before being invited to join them. The Foo Fighters brought Astley to rickroll a concert in London the same year.

In April 2018, the creators of the television drama Westworld, participating in a Reddit discussion, released a video that purported to be a spoiler guide for the second season in advance, but instead featured lead actress Evan Rachel Wood singing "Never Gonna Give You Up". While responses from Reddit users were mostly positive, the website Polygon wrote, "Westworld has finally killed the Rickroll". In the post-credits scene of Walt Disney Animation Studios' 2018 film Ralph Breaks the Internet, a fake sneak peek of Frozen II suddenly switches to Ralph singing "Never Gonna Give You Up" and replicating Astley's music video.

Rickrolls also became popular at sports games. On 25 August 2019, the Boston Red Sox and the San Diego Padres played a Major League Baseball game at the Padres' stadium. During a mid-inning break, the Padres' scoreboard began to play "Sweet Caroline"—a tradition at Red Sox home games—but as the song approached the chorus, the videoboard switched to "Never Gonna Give You Up". On 13 October 2019, during a Sunday Night NFL game between the Pittsburgh Steelers and Los Angeles Chargers at the Chargers' stadium, the announcers played the beginning of the Styx song "Renegade", a standard at the Steelers' stadium, then switched to "Never Gonna Give You Up".

==== 2020s resurgence ====
Rickrolling saw a significant resurgence online in the 2020s, during the COVID-19 pandemic. Replying to a Reddit post by Astley in June 2020, a user, u/theMalleableDuck, claimed to have met Astley backstage when they were 12 years old, but instead posted a link to the song. Astley replied with a clapping emoji, implying that he had been tricked into clicking the link. The thread became Reddit's most upvoted post of 2020. In July 2021, the YouTube video for "Never Gonna Give You Up" reached 1 billion views, becoming the fourth 1980s song to do so; this had included 2.3 million views on the preceding April Fools' Day. Astley responded in a Twitter video, "That is mind-blowing. The world is a wonderful and beautiful place, and I am very lucky." He also celebrated the event by selling signed copies of the song on vinyl, which quickly sold out.

In a 2021 episode of the sitcom Ted Lasso, "No Weddings and a Funeral", the character Rebecca prepares to give a eulogy but instead leads the attendees in singing "Never Gonna Give You Up", rickrolling them. Activist Greta Thunberg performed a rickroll during an October 2021 climate-action speech at the Climate Live concert in Stockholm, in which she said, "We're no strangers to love", before being joined by another activist in singing and dancing to the song; Astley tweeted that the video was "fantastic". Astley recreated the original video clip in a 2022 advertisement for the California State Automobile Association. Physical advertisements for the agency included QR codes to this video to rickroll the viewers.

In February 2025, in response to demands for the release of files related to the criminal investigation of Jeffrey Epstein, the Twitter account of Republicans on the House Judiciary Committee posted "#BREAKING: EPSTEIN FILES RELEASED" with a rickroll link. This post received a negative response from users, many of whom considered it inappropriate to joke about the subject, including Republican politician Anna Paulina Luna and right-wing activist Laura Loomer. The post was then deleted.

In the final Class 12 mathematics exam of India's Central Board of Secondary Education held in March 2026, the QR code on the front of some students' question papers linked to a rickroll, while others simply got the letter A, leading to claims that the paper was tampered or leaked. The examination board clarified that the papers were not compromised and that it would ensure that this would not happen again.

== Mechanism ==
=== Forms of humour ===
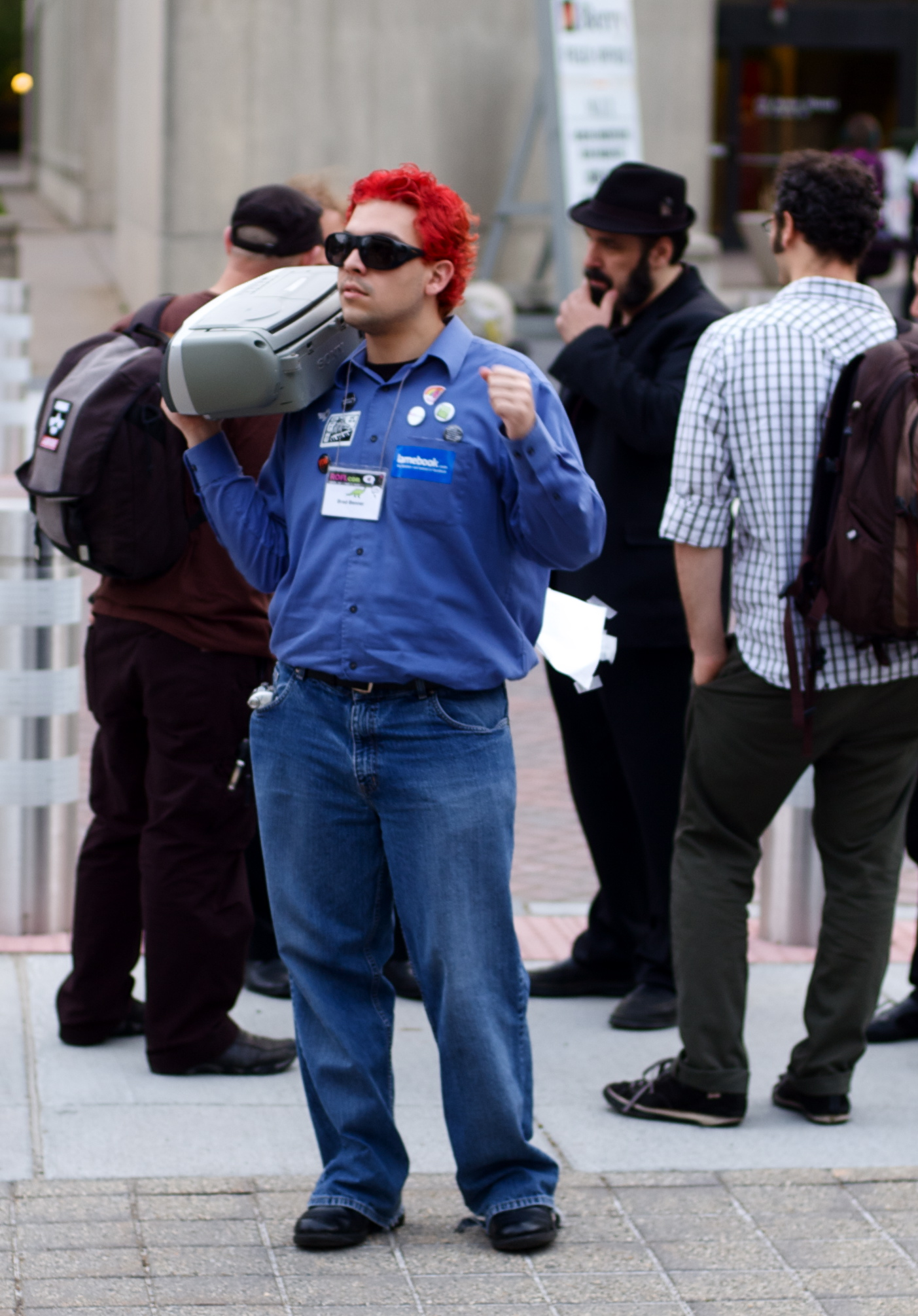
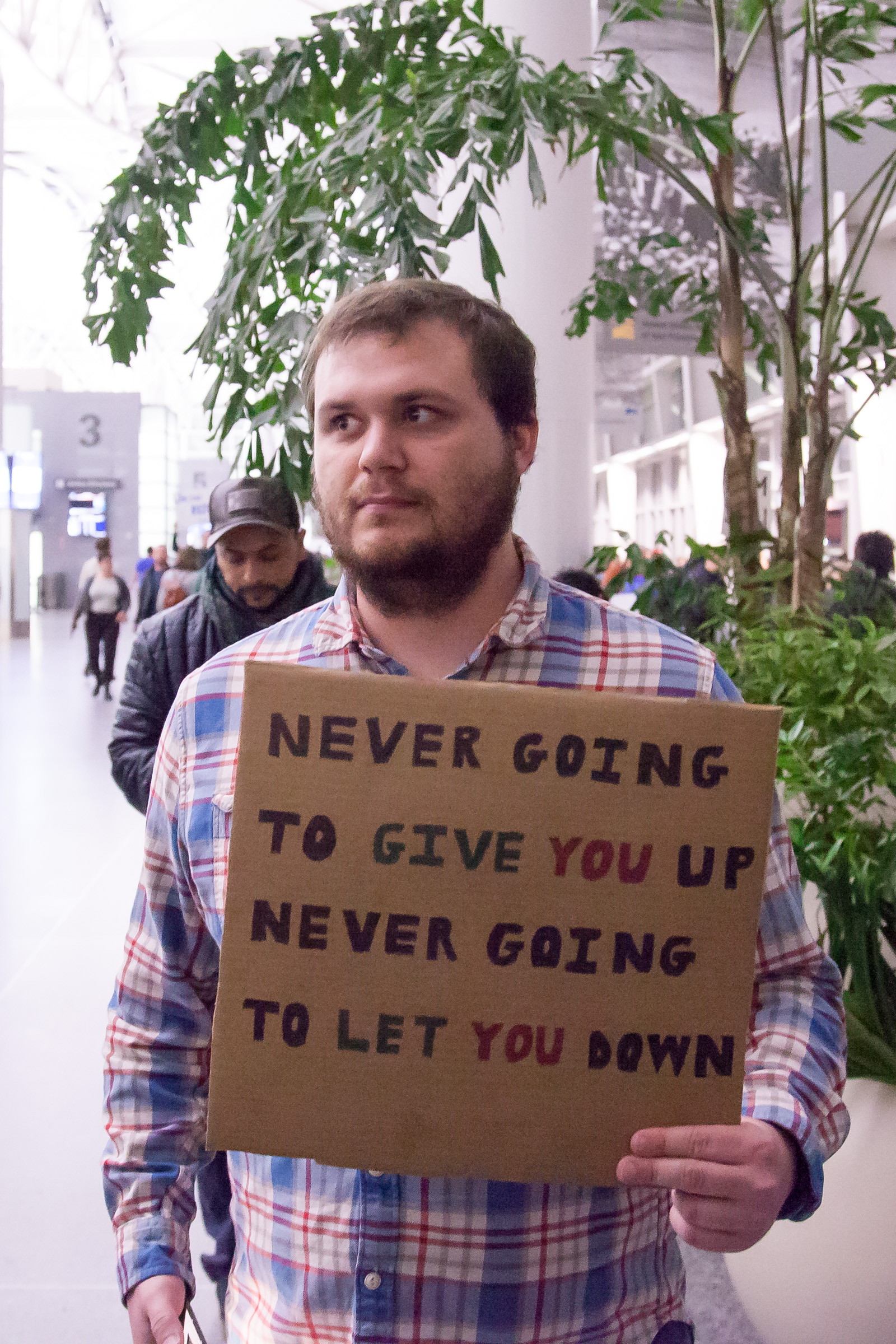
Rickrolling has evolved into various uses of "Never Gonna Give You Up", including playing it at events or incorporating its lyrics into unexpected contexts.

Rickrolling is a bait-and-switch joke in which the viewer clicks a link, expecting it to be something interesting—often involving sex, video games, or cats—but is instead brought to the song "Never Gonna Give You Up" or its video. This creates a humorous non-sequitur. Like many memes, rickrolling is multimodal as it incorporates multiple elements—hypertext and a music video. The music video is the part of the meme that is reproduced, while the fake target of the link is the part that varies. In its original form, rickrolling simply involves the unaltered music video. According to an analysis by informaticists Alexander O. Smith, Jasmina Tacheva, and Jeff Hemsley, images associated with the meme show little variation as the intention is to be recognised an obvious rickroll.

Unlike forms of humour used in most memes, rickrolling is a prank as it creates a situation that has a victim without serious harm. However, according to cultural scholars Joanna Nowotny and Julian Reidy, a rickroll is unlike a typical prank or hoax as it is not directed toward a specific victim, while also being less physical than most pranks and less serious than most hoaxes. Nowotny and Reid further state that an online prank like rickrolling may occur spontaneously, as a physical prank cannot, and the nature of online spaces allows victims to respond, a typical feature of hoaxes but not pranks.

Rickrolling, like the Trollface, is a meme primarily used for trolling; in contrast with other forms of trolling, it is fun rather than offensive. According to information scholars Madelyn Sanfilippo, Pnina Fichman, and Shannon Yang, forms of trolling such as rickrolling can create humour out of a reference recognised by an ingroup, distinguishing it from non-trolling humour. According to design scholar Ursula Murray Husted, members of the ingroup who recognise the meme respond positively to it and introduce it to newcomers by pranking them.

As a meme that has had multiple waves of popularity for over a decade, rickrolling has evolved into various forms of humour that incorporate the same song. The term has been extended to the act of playing the song to interrupt a public event—as was the case with the Scientology rickrolling —which gives the meme a spatial component. Other videos inspired by rickrolling include mashups, cover versions, and remixes of "Never Gonna Give You Up". Rickrolling also entails a phrase-based meme with the use of the song's lyrics in creative contexts, such as in a conversation.

=== Hyperlinking ===
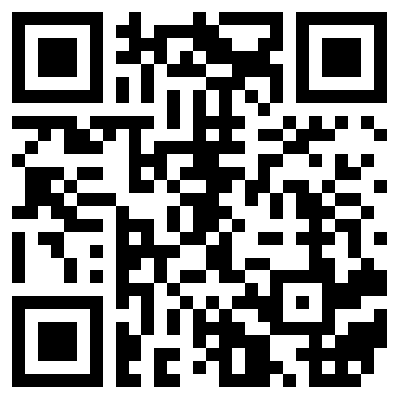
Rickrolls may use a QR code that sends viewers to "Never Gonna Give You Up".

Several YouTube uploads of "Never Gonna Give You Up" are used for rickrolling. Astley's official channel uploaded the music video on 24 October 2009, its URL ending with the identifier "dQw4w9WgXcQ". Computer scientists Benoit Baudry and Martin Monperrus called this "the canonical rickroll URL", being the first result for the YouTube search string rick astley never gonna give you up. The oldest version of the video on YouTube was uploaded by Cotter when the meme began. The website briefly removed this several times, including in February 2010 (which YouTube said was from the video being mistakenly reported), May 2012 (caused by an antivirus software), and July 2014 (which the company did not explain); in each case, it was restored within hours, but its removal received widespread online attention. By 2014, the original, unofficial upload had 70 million views, while the official upload had 84 million.

Many cases of rickrolling have occurred on forums and on social media platforms such as Twitter and Vine. Another common way to rickroll is to use a QR code, as this hides the target until it is scanned. According to a study by Ada Lerner et al, users of the Scan app scanned codes leading to the "dQw4w9WgXcQ" URL over 1,600 times between May 2013 and March 2014. Authors of academic literature also include rickrolls, such as by placing them in footnotes. Baudry and Monperrus documented such cases by searching Google Scholar for "dQw4w9WgXcQ" in 2022, finding 24 instances in which an author appeared to include the URL with the intent to rickroll.

== Analysis and impact ==
The meme had a positive impact on Astley's career, introducing a new group of fans to his music. He said it caused him to like "Never Gonna Give You Up" after "15 years of not singing it". He also said it played a role in the reestablishment of his music career—his 2016 album 50, his first in over a decade, reached number one on the UK Album Chart. In a 2016 interview with Rolling Stone, Astley said of the meme, "It's done me a lot of good, probably. The thing is it's not personal to me, even though I know it is me and it's my name in the title of Rickrolling. It's that video that I'm in, it's that song that's mine, but it could have been anybody." Quoted in the Associated Press in 2022, he said, "The video and the song have drifted off into the ether and become something else, and I'm ever so grateful for it." After performing at Glastonbury Festival 2023, Astley said this would not have been possible "without my old songs and without the Rickrolling thing with its own little universe". That year, The Observer writer Barbara Ellen stated that the meme gave Astley an image of being cool, unlike most late-career musicians.

Writing for MEL magazine, Brian VanHooker attributed the use of the song to its "randomness" and its status as a decades-old hit. Writing for The New Yorker, Michael Schulman said these factors and the catchiness of the song contribute to the meme's "Dadaist humor". Rickrolling is less negative than other pranks; unlike other media used in bait-and-switch humour, the song is inoffensive, allowing it to be used by many types of people in many situations as a friendly prank. Tumblr user deluxetrashqueen wrote, "Honestly, Rick Rolling is the best practical joke ever. Like, there's nothing offensive or mean spirited about it. It's just like 'Oops you thought there would be something else here but it's "Never Gonna Give You Up".' which isn't even a bad song." According to communication scholars Ryan M. Milner and Whitney Phillips, rickrolling is a form of Internet folklore based on a copyrighted work; as such, participants are an example of "poachers", as defined by Michel de Certeau, whose cultures rely on the property of others.

According to Milner, rickrolling is a meme that appeals to those within Internet culture but also uses elements that resonate with the general public, comparing it to Doge, a meme incorporating a picture of a dog. Writing for Mashable, Chloe Bryan called rickrolling "universal" as it can easily be adapted to different contexts. According to sociolinguist Danielle H. Heinrichs, some rickrolls blend humour with another genre, which she compares to the folkloric motif of the multifaceted trickster. Communication scholar Eric Harvey interprets rickrolling as making fun of the act of clicking a link for instant gratification. Cultural scholar Tracey Potts wrote, "it is easy to see pop culture as one giant rickroll, a cultural bait-and-switch where, regardless of what we select or click on, we end up back with more of the same".

Blogger David Griner of Adfreak.com said in 2008 that rickrolling was the "perfect example of a viral video because the definition of one is something that gets out and is uncontrollable". Mashable's Bryan wrote in 2017 that, although the rickroll is no longer popular, this works in favour of the prank as victims are less likely to expect it. Caldwell of Know Your Meme said in 2020, "It seems like the volume of memes these days means that none of them have any longevity, but for Rickrolling, it's such an old meme that it's like an 'old-school' Internet reference. It's nostalgic." Cotter expressed this sentiment in the description of his YouTube upload: "as long as trolls are still trolling, the Rick will never stop rolling".

== See also ==
- List of Internet phenomena
- List of practical joke topics
- "Sandstorm", an instrumental piece by Finnish DJ Darude that has become the subject of a similar Internet meme.
- "Trololo", another song used as a meme, known as the "Russian Rickroll"
