= Jefferson Smith (politician) =

American politician and radio personality (born 1973)

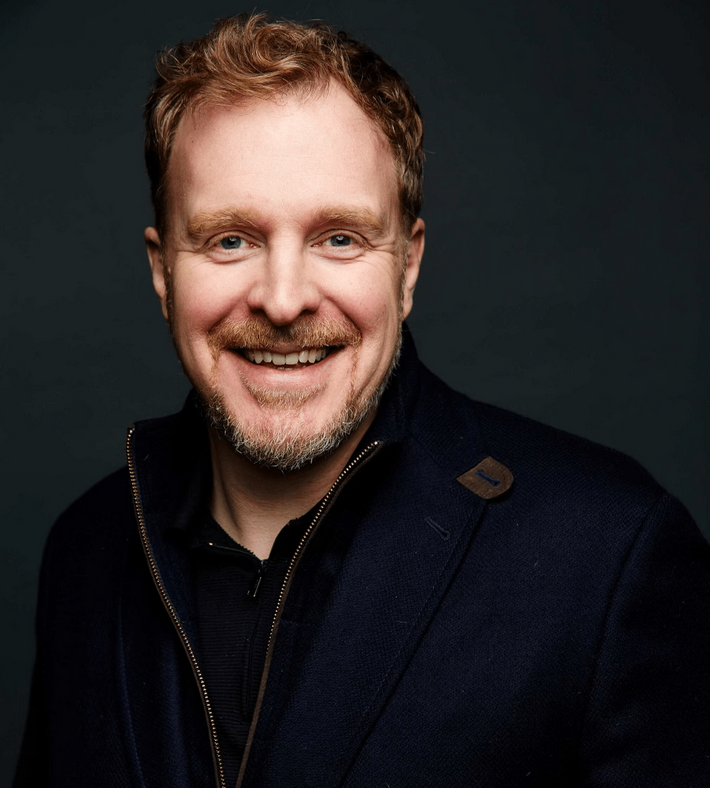

Member of the Oregon House of Representatives from the 47th district
- In office 2009–2012
- Preceded by: Jeff Merkley
- Succeeded by: Jessica Vega Pederson

Personal details
- Born: June 29, 1973 (age 53) Portland, Oregon, U.S.
- Party: Democratic
- Parent: Joe Smith (father)
- Education: University of Oregon; Harvard Law School
- Profession: Attorney
- Jefferson Smith's voice Smith being interviewed by Bruce Broussard; Recorded October 9, 2011

Jefferson Smith (born June 29, 1973) is an American former radio personality and politician who served in the Oregon House of Representatives, representing District 47 in east Portland, from 2009 to 2012. He was one of two candidates for Mayor of Portland in 2012 to advance beyond the primary election, but lost to Charlie Hales in the November general election. He also founded Bus Project.

He served in the 2010 and 2012 legislative sessions, but to facilitate his run for mayor, he did not run for reelection to the House and he vacated his seat after serving four years.

== Early life and education ==
Smith was born in Portland in 1973 to former Umatilla County district attorney and Oregon representative Joe Smith and family therapist Suzanne Peck. He was named for U.S. President Thomas Jefferson. His grandfather was Joseph Fielding Smith, a patriarch to the church and a general authority of the Church of Jesus Christ of Latter-day Saints. He is a great-great-great grandnephew of Joseph Smith, founder of Mormonism.

His parents split before his second birthday, and he moved with his mother to South Pasadena, California. He returned to Portland during his seventh-grade year, and later became class president at Grant High School. His mother died of breast cancer when Smith was a teenager.

Smith earned a bachelor's degree in political science from the University of Oregon, where he was a member of the Beta Theta Pi fraternity. At his father's insistence, he took a year off during college, serving as a youth counselor in Lane County and then running youth sports programs in Washington, D.C. In 1993, while attending the University of Oregon, Smith was cited for a misdemeanor assault at a fraternity party but the charge was later dropped following a diversion agreement that included covering the victim's medical expenses and community service. The incident involved a dispute where Smith admitted to reacting physically after his advances were rebuffed. Despite initial discrepancies in accounts between Smith, the victim, and police reports, Smith acknowledged the altercation's seriousness and its implications on his public image, particularly when attempting to reconcile with the victim prior to media involvement.

Smith went on to earn a J.D. degree from Harvard Law School, where he finished in the top five percent in his class.

== Career ==
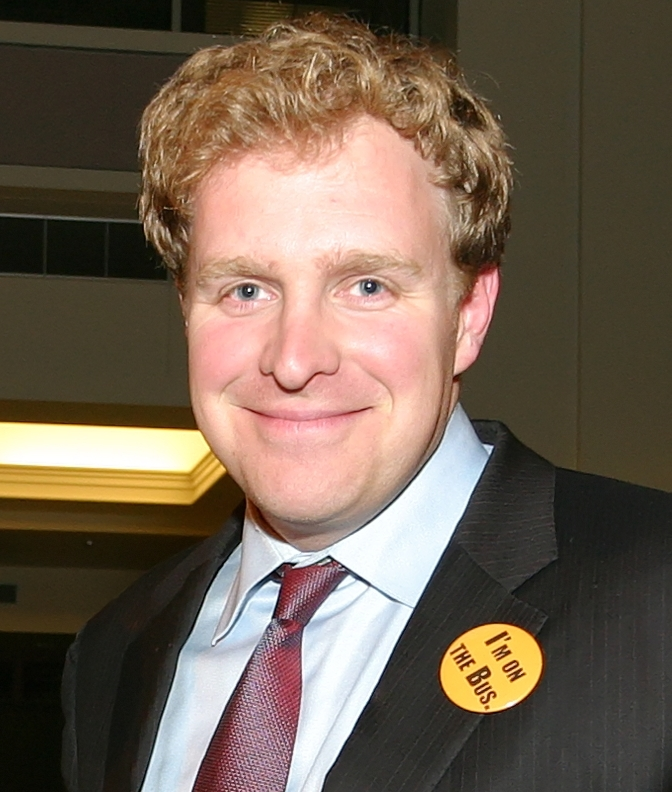

=== Early career ===
Smith began his professional career as a member of the Oregon Club during his time at Harvard University. Following law school, Smith took a job at the New York City law firm Wachtell, Lipton, Rosen & Katz. His second day on the job, he was asked to take a case defending tobacco companies. He declined, and returned to Oregon. He briefly worked for Stoel Rives, but became motivated to establish an organization dedicated to engaging young people with progressive politics. He soon left the law firm, founding the Bus Project in 2001, an organization focuses on empowering young people to participate in the democratic process. Bus Project is now known as NextUp.

In 2003, Smith formed a brief partnership with Jason Skelton, forming the law firm of Smith & Skelton LLP.

=== Political career ===
In 2008, Smith was elected with no opposition to the Oregon House of Representatives representing House District 47. The seat had been vacated by Jeff Merkley, who was running for the United States Senate.

In the Legislature, Smith collaborated with representatives from rural Eastern Oregon to develop a statewide water strategy. He co-led the initiative called "Cool Schools" to create jobs by helping Oregon public schools begin retrofitting for energy savings. Smith co-led the legislature's budget transparency initiative to put Oregon government spending information online, and carried a bill to reduce the ratio of middle managers to line employees in state government. Smith also co-led the initiative to create online voter registration in Oregon, and carried a bill in the Legislature to allow trafficked minors to expunge their prostitution convictions upon reaching age 21 if they have had no other trouble with the law.

In April 2011, Smith released the results of a video he compiled of Oregon state representatives reciting the lyrics of Rick Astley's 1980s pop hit "Never Gonna Give You Up".

In September 2011, he announced he would run for Mayor of Portland in 2012. In the May 2012 primary election, Smith defeated most other candidates to become one of the two candidates advancing to the November general election. He received 32.9% of the vote in the primary, while Charlie Hales received 37.2%. In the general election, closing on November 6, 2012, Smith received approximately 31.3% of the vote and was defeated by Hales, who received 61.2%.

Smith served in the 2012 Legislative session, but to facilitate his run for mayor he did not run for reelection to the House and vacated his seat in the Legislature after serving four years.

=== 2012 Portland Mayoral Campaign controversies ===
A series of incidents from Smith's past uncovered by The Oregonian and Willamette Week derailed his 2012 mayoral campaign. In July 2012, The Willamette Week revealed that Smith had been banned from an intramural soccer league in early 2011 after pushing another player, and subsequently ejected from a pickup basketball game at the Harriet Tubman School gym in North Portland after punching another player. Smith conceded to reporter Nigel Jaquiss that he had thrown a punch, but argued that the blow was not aimed at the player's genitals, as alleged by witness accounts. In August 2012, The Oregonian—following up on earlier reporting—revealed that Smith's driver's license had been suspended seven times from 2002 to 2010. Smith had previously declined to provide complete information about his driving record to the press. In October 2012, The Willamette Week revealed that Smith was cited for a misdemeanor assault in 1993 involving a woman. Smith's account of the incident to the press following the revelation was challenged by the victim and contradicted by the police report. As further details from the case emerged, Smith lost the endorsement of the Portland Police Association and the Portland Firefighters Association. Although Smith had been the mayoral frontrunner early on in the campaign, he would go on to lose to Charlie Hales by more than 30 percentage points. Smith would later concede that the revelations—especially the assault charge—had cost him the election.

=== 1993 fraternity party incident ===
In 1993, Eugene police cited Smith for a misdemeanor assault charge stemming from an incident with an 18-year-old woman at fraternity party. According to the police report, the woman touched Smith's chest, after which he grabbed her arms. He then drew back and struck her with a fist to the eye, causing a one-inch cut that required several stitches. "He really popped me," the victim told police. Smith was attending the University of Oregon at the time.

Police and the Lane County District Attorney's office dropped the charge after Smith reached a diversion agreement with the city of Eugene and the victim. Smith agreed to cover the woman's medical expenses, pay a $250 court fee, and complete 20 hours of community service, among other conditions. The incident came to light during Smith's 2012 campaign for Portland mayor. Smith tried to speak with the victim at her home before reporters contacted her, but she told him to leave. Smith's eventual account of the incident to the press was challenged by the victim and contradicted by the police report.

A year after the election, Smith admitted that the woman had rebuffed his advances before the altercation. Although Smith denied knocking the woman off of a couch later in the evening, he conceded to grabbing her and then hitting her above the eye when she confronted him.

== Radio entrepreneur and personality ==
In 2013, Smith led an effort to bring progressive talk radio to Portland's low-power non-profit radio station XRAY.FM. He brokered agreements with radio personalities including Thom Hartmann and Carl Wolfson. He also launched his own program, Thank You Democracy. Smith occasionally fills in as guest host of the Thom Hartmann Program. In 2018, his company Flying Ant, LLC purchased radio station KUIK (1360 AM) in Hillsboro.

In November 2020, staff of XRAY.FM alleged that Smith engaged in unprofessional behavior and financial mismanagement of the station. A report in Willamette Week quoted an outside audit of the station, which had found its payroll was in disarray and that the station was in significant legal risk of minimum wage and overtime violations for its contract workers. Six former employees who spoke to the paper described Smith as bullying and intimidating, especially towards women. Following this article, XRAY's staff released a statement acknowledging the concerns raised and detailing their desire to move forward.

In light of these allegations, he stepped down from his role as executive director of the station in December 2020 and became a 'senior advisor' to the station.

== Personal ==
Smith is married to Katy Lesowski, also a Portland native, and a co-founder of the Bus Project. His late stepmother, Meredith Wood Smith, was chair of the Oregon Democratic Party from 2006 to 2012.

== Electoral history ==
2008 Oregon State Representative, 47th district
Party	Candidate	Votes	%
Democratic	Jefferson Smith	14,858	96.6
Write-in		528	3.4
Total votes		15,386	100%

2010 Oregon State Representative, 47th district
Party	Candidate	Votes	%
Democratic	Jefferson Smith	10,395	62.2
Republican	Dee Flowers	6,256	37.5
Write-in		50	0.3
Total votes		16,701	100%

== See also ==
- Portland, Oregon mayoral election, 2012
- Joseph Fielding Smith, Smith's grandfather
- KXRY
