= 2012 Portland, Oregon, mayoral election =

- November 6, 2012
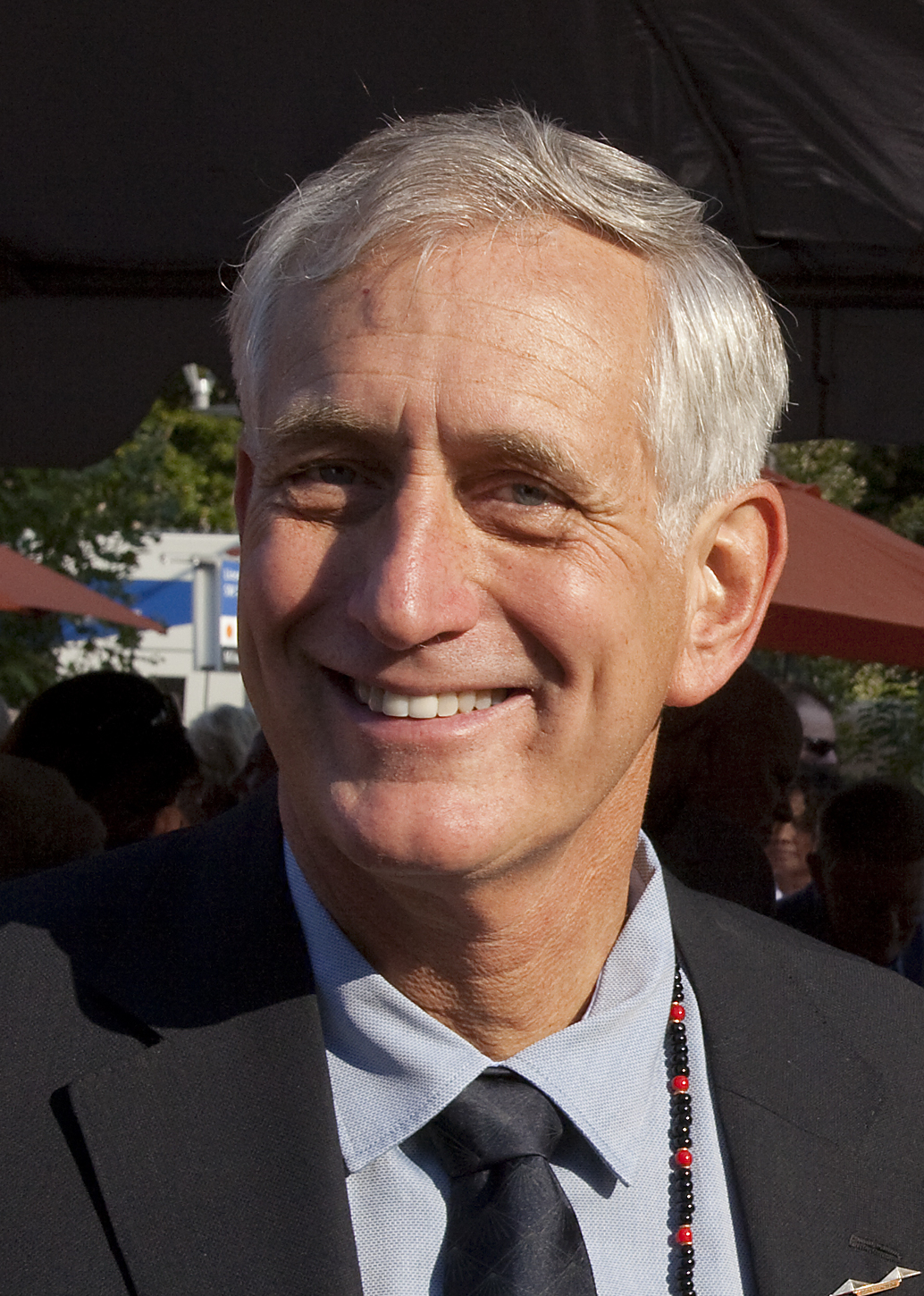

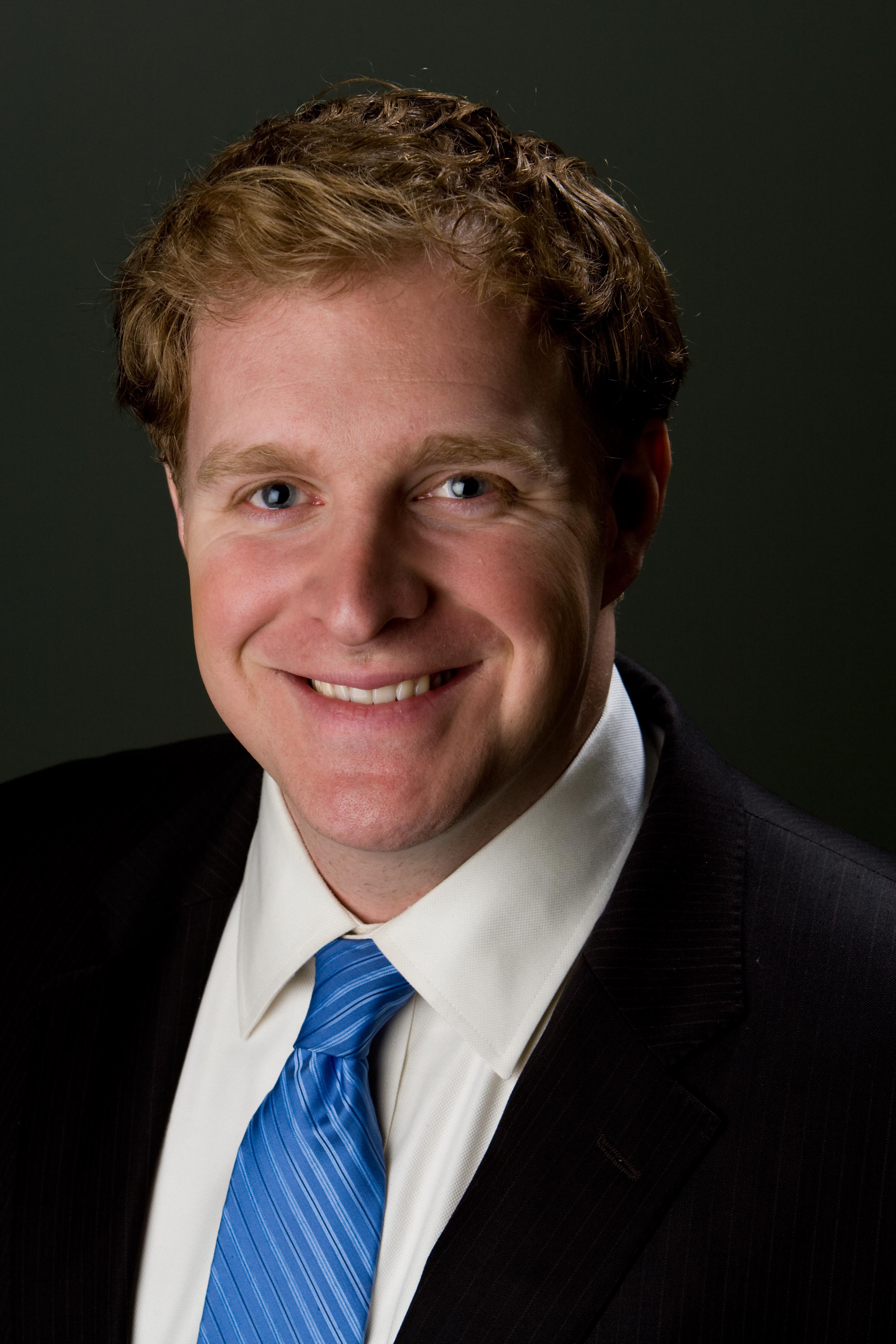

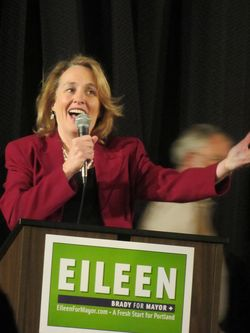
Nominee	Charlie Hales	Jefferson Smith	Eileen Brady
First-round vote	50,403	44,484	29,427
First-round percentage	37.22%	32.85%	21.73%
Second-round vote	163,522	83,741
Second-round percentage	61.2%	31.3%
Mayor before election
Sam Adams
Elected mayor
Charlie Hales

On Tuesday, November 6, 2012, an election was held in Portland, Oregon, to elect the mayor. Charlie Hales was elected, defeating Jefferson Smith. Incumbent mayor Sam Adams did not seek a second term.

Portland uses a nonpartisan system for local elections, in which all voters are eligible to participate. All candidates are listed on the ballot without any political party affiliation.

All candidates meeting the qualifications competed in a blanket primary election on Tuesday, May 15, 2012. As no candidate received an absolute majority, the top two finishers advanced to a runoff in the November 6 general election. In the general election, former city commissioner Charlie Hales defeated state representative Jefferson Smith with approximately 61% of the vote.

== Primary ==
=== Candidates on the ballot ===
- David Ackerman, mailroom operator for The Oregonian
- Tre Arrow, environmental activist
- Max Bauske, student at Portland Community College
- Sam Belisle, manager at Red Robin
- Eileen Brady, businesswoman and co-founder of New Seasons Market
- Loren Brown, screenwriter
- Max Brumm, college student
- Dave Campbell, unemployed
- Robert Carron, artist and writer
- Bill Dant, real estate broker
- Scott Fernandez
- Charlie Hales, former Portland City Commissioner
- Lew Humble, retired mechanic
- Shonda Kelley, homemaker
- Michael Langley, businessman
- Blake Nieman-Davis, businessman
- Josh Nuttall, cashier
- Christopher Rich, media producer
- Scott Rose, architect for DLR Group
- Howie Rubin, insurance agent
- Jefferson Smith, state Representative
- Steve Sung, civil engineer
- Cameron Whitten, Occupy Portland protester

=== Declined to run ===
- Sam Adams, incumbent mayor
- Earl Blumenauer, U.S. Representative
- Jeff Cogen, Chairman of the Multnomah County Board of Commissioners
- Jim Francesconi, former Portland City Commissioner
- Steve Novick, political strategist and Democratic candidate for the United States Senate in 2008
- Mike Reese, Chief of the Portland Police Bureau
- Dan Saltzman, Portland City Commissioner

=== Polling ===
Poll source	Date(s) administered	Sample size	Margin of error	Sam Adams	Tre Arrow	Eileen Brady	Max Brumm	Bill Dant	Charlie Hales	Mike Reese	Jefferson Smith	Other	Undecided
DMH Research	May 10–12, 2012	500	± 4.4%	—	—	16%	—	—	32%	—	24%	8%	21%
SurveyUSA/KATU	May 4–7, 2012	563	± 4.2%	—	—	28%	—	—	25%	—	27%	5%	15%
Elway/KGW/The Oregonian	May 2–6, 2012	400	± 5.0%	—	—	16%	—	—	29%	—	28%	6%	18%
DHM Research/KPTV/OPB	April 28–30, 2012	400	± 4.9%	—	—	23%	—	—	25%	—	20%	6%	28%
DHM Research/KPTV/OPB	April 28–30, 2012	400	± 4.9%	18%	—	21%	—	—	22%	—	17%	—	23%
SurveyUSA/KATU	April 10–12, 2012	548	± 4.3%	—	—	34%	—	—	22%	—	15%	9%	21%
SurveyUSA/KATU	February 23–26, 2012	555	± 4.2%	—	7%	25%	2%	3%	16%	—	10%	8%	28%
SurveyUSA/KATU	November 2–7, 2011	537	± 4.3%	—	—	23%	—	—	19%	–	14%	—	44%
SurveyUSA/KATU	November 2–7, 2011	537	± 4.3%	—	—	19%	—	—	13%	20%	11%	—	38%

=== Debate ===
2012 Portland mayoral election debate
No.	Date	Host	Moderator	Link	Nonpartisan	Nonpartisan	Nonpartisan
Key: P Participant A Absent N Not invited I Invited W Withdrawn							
Key: P Participant A Absent N Not invited I Invited W Withdrawn					Eileen Brady	Charlie Hales	Jefferson Smith
1	Apr. 27, 2012	AM 860; University of Portland	Tim Hohl	YouTube	P	P	P

=== Results ===
Portland mayoral primary election, 2012
Party	Candidate	Votes	%
Nonpartisan	Charlie Hales	50,403	37.22
Nonpartisan	Jefferson Smith	44,484	32.85
Nonpartisan	Eileen Brady	29,427	21.73
Nonpartisan	Scott Rose	1,740	1.29
Nonpartisan	Cameron Whitten	1,730	1.28
Nonpartisan	Scott Fernandez	1,372	1.01
Nonpartisan	Steve Sung	1,204	0.89
Nonpartisan	Tre Arrow	916	0.68
Nonpartisan	Max Brumm	793	0.59
Nonpartisan	Michael Langley	511	0.38
Nonpartisan	Bill Dant	378	0.28
Nonpartisan	David "The Ack" Ackerman	360	0.27
Nonpartisan	Dave Campbell	320	0.24
Nonpartisan	Shonda Kelley	279	0.21
Nonpartisan	Loren Brown	211	0.16
Nonpartisan	Howie Rubin	184	0.14
Nonpartisan	Max Bauske	137	0.10
Nonpartisan	Christopher Rich	115	0.08
Nonpartisan	Lew Humble	91	0.07
Nonpartisan	Robert Carron	87	0.06
Nonpartisan	Josh Nuttall	69	0.05
Nonpartisan	Sam Belisle	59	0.04
Nonpartisan	Blake Neiman-Davis	55	0.04
Write-in		479	0.35
Total votes		135,404	100

== General election ==
The November 6 general election was a race between top-two primary finishers Charlie Hales and Jefferson Smith.

=== Polling ===
Poll source	Date(s) administered	Sample size	Margin of error	Charlie Hales	Jefferson Smith	Other	Undecided
SurveyUSA	October 7–9, 2012	513	± 4.4%	37%	30%	—	33%
SurveyUSA	September 14–18, 2012	506	± 4.4%	34%	29%	—	37%

=== Results ===
Portland mayoral general election, 2012
Party	Candidate	Votes	%
Nonpartisan	Charlie Hales	163,522	61.2
Nonpartisan	Jefferson Smith	83,741	31.3
Write-in		20,039	7.5
Total votes		267,302	100
