= Charlie Hales =

American politician

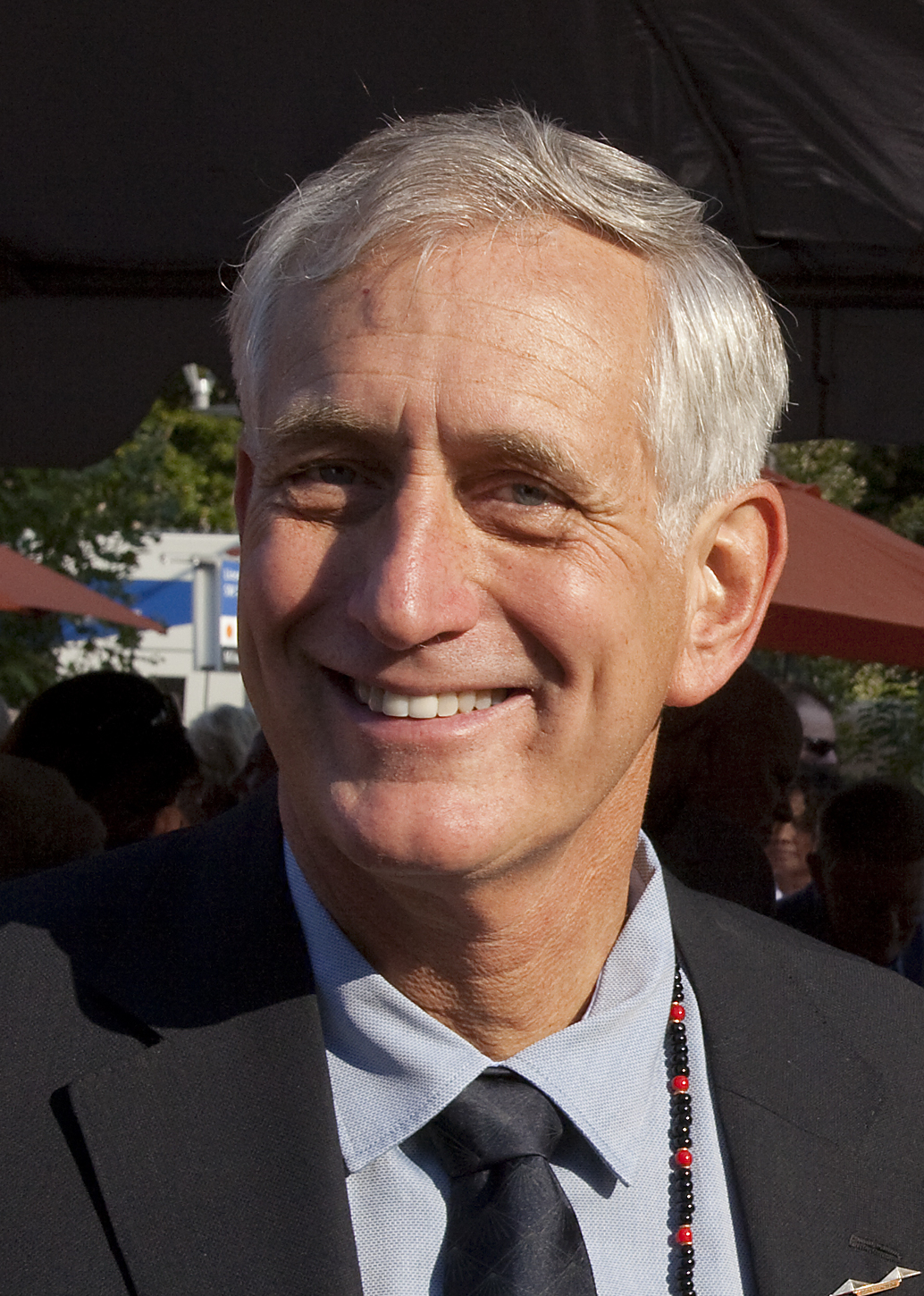
- Hales in 2015

52nd Mayor of Portland
- In office January 1, 2013 – January 1, 2017
- Preceded by: Sam Adams
- Succeeded by: Ted Wheeler

Portland City Commissioner
- In office January 1993 – May 2002
- Preceded by: Dick Bogle
- Succeeded by: Randy Leonard

Personal details
- Born: Charles Andrew Hales; January 22, 1956 (age 70) Washington, D.C., U.S.
- Party: Democratic
- Spouse: Nancy Hales
- Children: 5
- Education: University of Virginia

Charles Andrew Hales (born January 22, 1956) is a former American politician who served as the 52nd mayor of Portland, Oregon, from 2013 to 2017. He previously served on the Portland City Council from 1993 to 2002.

== Early life and education ==
Charles Andrew Hales was born in Washington, D.C., in January 1956. His father, Alfred Ross Hales, Jr., was a structural engineer for the United States Navy and his mother, Carol Hales, was a homemaker. He had two older siblings but, at nine years younger than his brother, grew up "virtually as an only child."

Hales attended public schools in Alexandria, Virginia, and graduated from Thomas Edison High School in Fairfax County, where he participated in band and drama club. He graduated from the University of Virginia in 1979 with a bachelor's degree in political theory. He took graduate studies in public administration at Lewis & Clark College in Portland.

== Political career ==
Prior to being elected, Hales worked as a lobbyist, working for the Oregon Mobile Home Park Association and for the Home Builders Association of Metropolitan Portland, where he was the vice president.

=== City Council ===
Hales was elected to Portland City Council in 1992. He was sworn in as a City Commissioner in January 1993.

During his tenure on the city council, Hales conceived of and won voter approval for the first parks bond measure in over 50 years, funding construction of two new community centers and over 100 park improvement projects across the city. Hales completed the first phase of the Portland Streetcar system, the first urban streetcar in the US in almost 50 years. He also completed the planning of the Pearl District and South Waterfront redevelopment areas, which were designed as dense, transit-oriented "new urban" neighborhoods. Hales' advocacy for transportation — summed up in his stated goal to make Portland "the best European city in America" for non-auto transportation — earned him the nickname, "Choo-Choo Charlie".

One of Hales' more controversial initiatives as a city commissioner was diversifying Portland Fire Bureau workforce. He hired the first chief from outside the Bureau ranks, and created an apprenticeship program that added over 80 women and people of color to what had previously been a 99-percent white, male organization. He also became the only Portland politician to vote against Joint Terrorism Task Force involvement.

Hales' attendance declined in 2001 during his campaign for the executive director position of the Port of Portland. At the end of May 2002, part way through his third term, Hales left to take a position with HDR, Inc., an engineering firm, where he managed planning and design of new streetcar lines in cities across the country. Following his departure from City Council, Hales told Willamette Week that he considered the 1994 parks bond measure and the streetcar to be his greatest achievements while in office.

=== Mayoral tenure ===
In 2011, Hales announced that he would be a candidate for mayor in 2012. On November 6, 2012, he defeated challenger Jefferson Smith, receiving 61% of the vote. He assumed office on January 1, 2013.

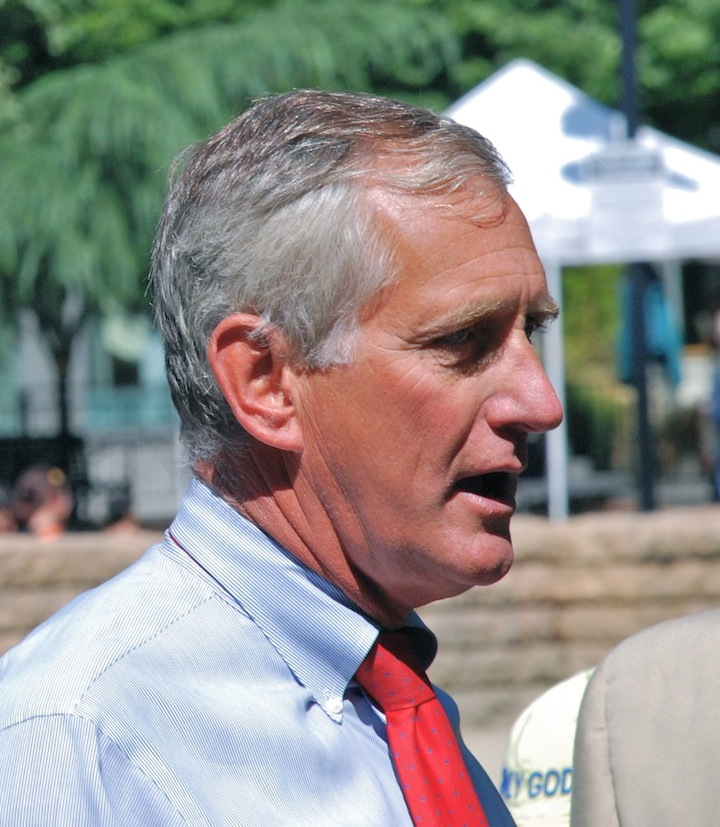
Hales in 2011

During the first two years of his tenure as mayor, Hales confronted the city's largest-ever budget shortfall — $21 million — and emerged with a balanced budget, as well as conservative budgeting practices that allowed in enough revenue for supplemental budgets. Hales also reformed police practices, prioritizing community policing through walking beats and his choice in police chief, the community-minded Larry O'Dea. Along with Commissioner Steve Novick, Hales in 2014 proposed $46 million in new fees to pay for street maintenance and safety improvements, such as filling pot holes and building sidewalks. On March 6, 2015, Hales announced he would seek reelection for the 2016 mayoral election. In September, State Treasurer and former county commissioner Ted Wheeler announced his intention to run a well-funded campaign against Hales. A month later Hales abandoned his reelection bid, stating, "So when confronted with a choice between giving my full effort to the job of being mayor and spending that energy on a long and consuming re-election campaign, it's an easy choice. Therefore, I have decided not to file for re-election." Wheeler won election in May 2016 with token opposition.

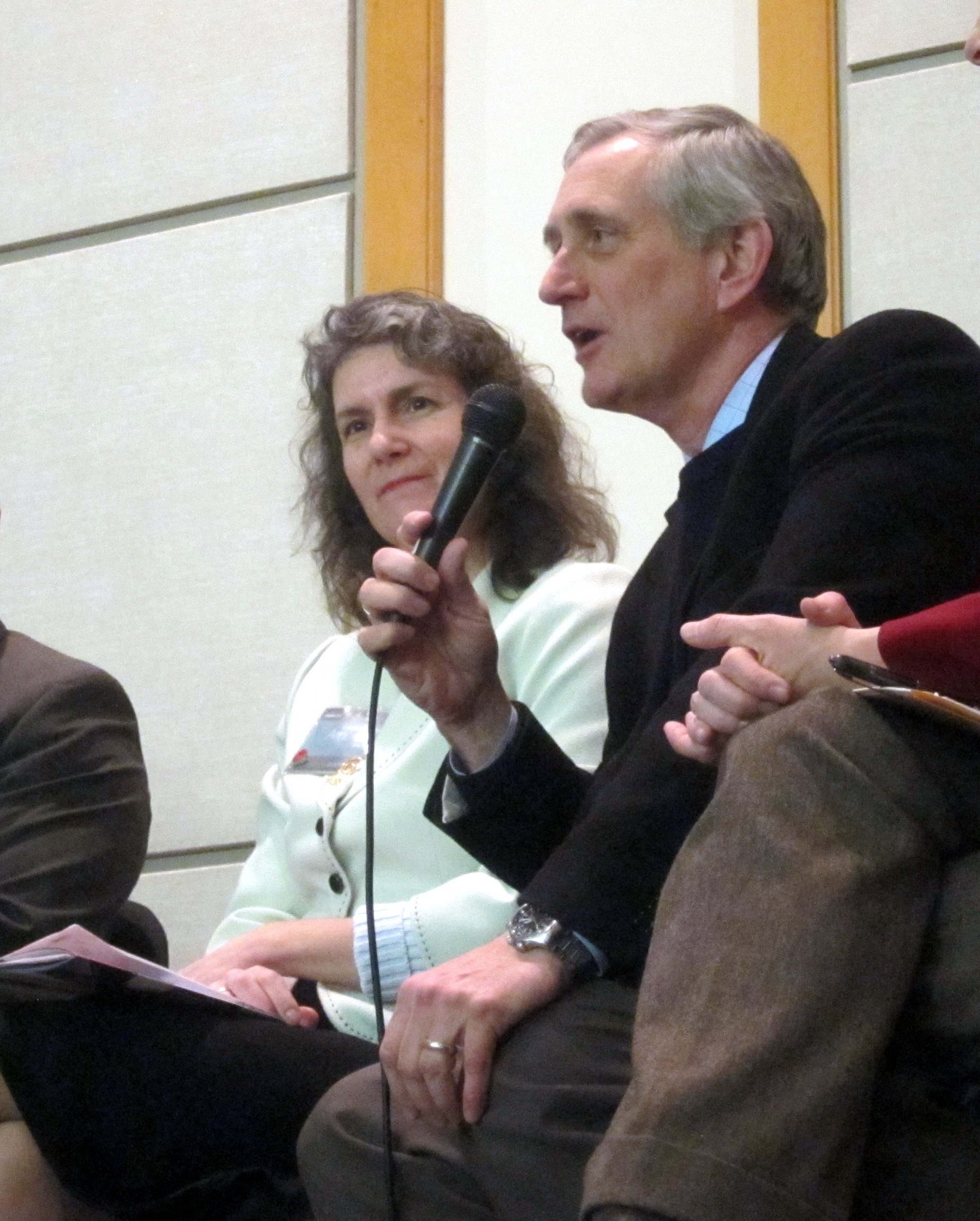
Hales campaigning for mayor in February 2012

On November 3, 2015, Hales and the city government passed a resolution opposing the local expansion of fossil fuel infrastructure. Hales faced controversy over his decisions regarding Portland's homeless issue. He initially declared a housing emergency in 2015 before experimenting with a "Safe Sleep Policy" which promoted non-enforcement of anti-camping laws on sidewalks and rights of way, which was promptly met with lawsuits from local businesses and neighborhood groups. He was protested by residents adjacent to the Springwater Corridor Trail.

Hales was criticized as failing in oversight of the Portland Police and effort to gain accountability. In an editorial summarizing his single term, The Oregonian called Hales "imperious and clueless" and wrote Hales squandered opportunities to support public oversight, picked an unwinnable fight with a Federal judge, failed to streamline the city's "byzantine" police-accountability system, and failed to discipline police chief Larry O'Dea, who while drinking and playing with a gun, shot an acquaintance. Hales received public criticism during his 2012 campaign for voting eight times in Oregon while a Washington resident. From 2004 to 2009, he claimed tax residency at his wife's Stevenson, Washington home. Oregon taxes income in Hales' bracket at 10.8 percent, while Washington has no income tax.

== Personal life ==
Hales married his second wife Nancy in 2004. An avid backpacker and sailor, he spent a month sailing around the San Juan Islands after his term as a city commissioner, and then went to work for HDR, Inc.

== See also ==
- 2012 Portland, Oregon mayoral election

Political offices
Preceded by Sam Adams	Mayor of Portland, Oregon; 2013–2017	Succeeded by Ted Wheeler
