= Water Avenue Coffee =

Coffee roaster in Portland, Oregon, U.S.

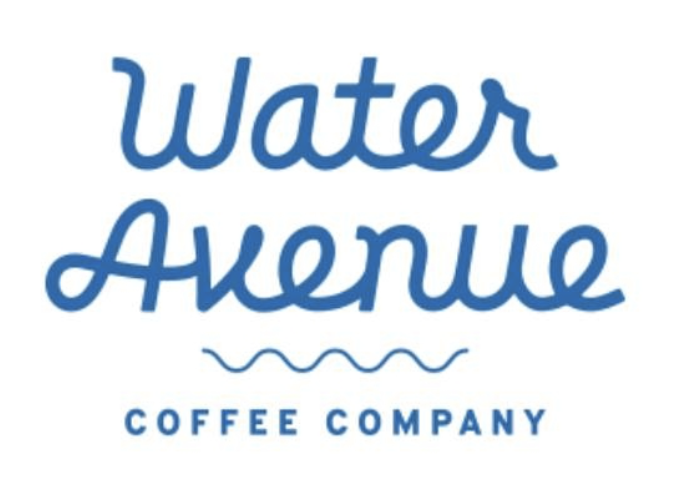

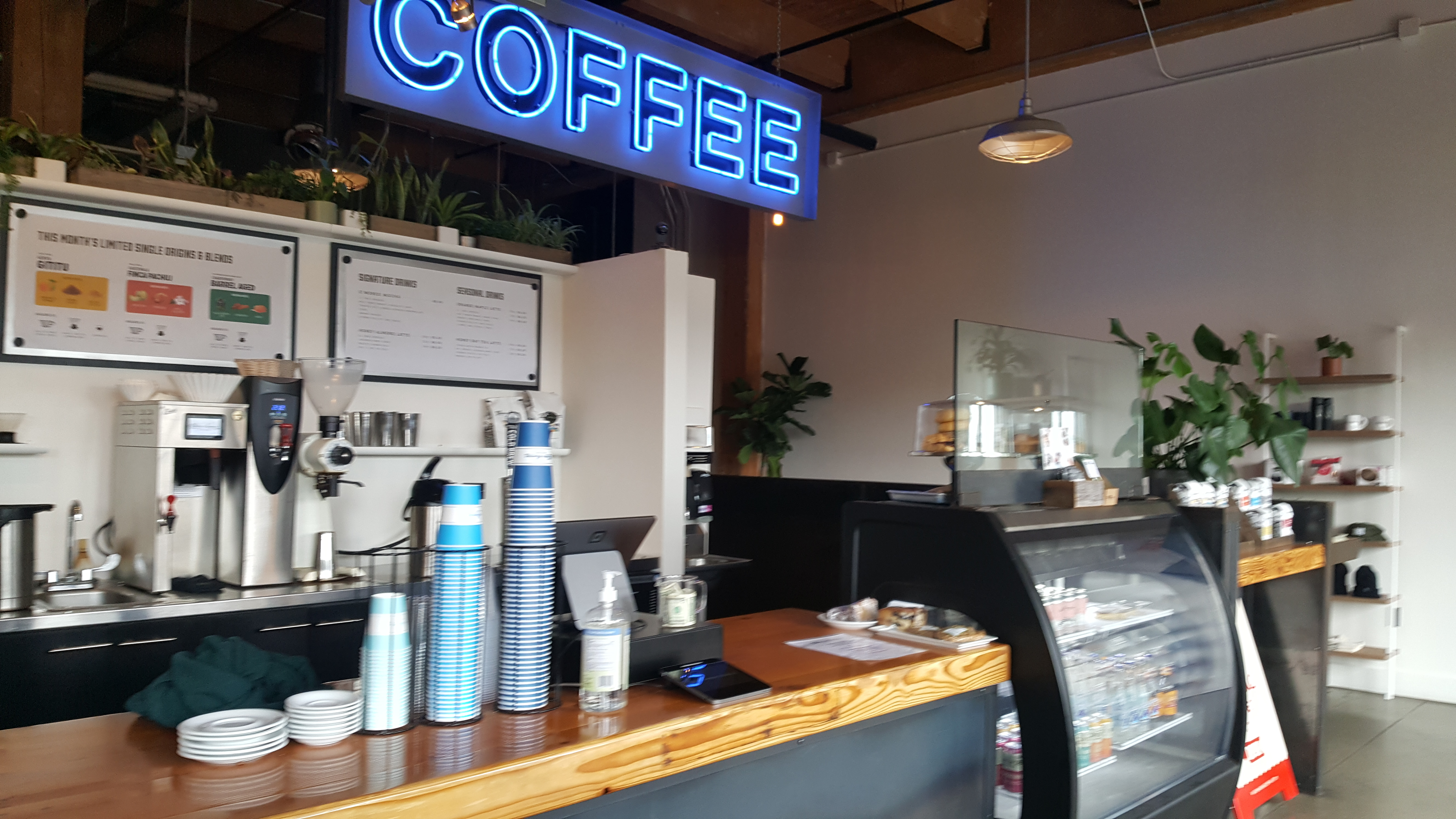
- Interior of the restaurant at SE Water Avenue and SE Taylor Street, 2022
- Industry: Coffee shop
- Founded: 2009
- Area served: Portland, Oregon

Water Avenue Coffee is a coffee "micro-roaster" with multiple locations in Portland, Oregon. Matt Milletto is a co-founder.

== History ==
Water Avenue Coffee was established in 2009. The business launched a mobile coffee truck in 2013. Water Avenue signed a lease on a new roasting facility at Southeast 8th and Main in 2015, joining the flagship cafe Water Avenue and Southeast Taylor. The business also began selling barrel-aged coffee in 2015. An expanded food menu was launched at their flagship cafe in 2016.

In 2016, Water Avenue Coffee opened a second coffee bar at Sixth at Yamhill in downtown Portland.

The company was sold to Harder Day Coffee in August 2024.

== Reception ==
Brittany Fowler selected Water Avenue Coffee to represent Portland in Business Insider's 2015 list of the best coffee shops in 13 major cities in the U.S. Willamette Week included the downtown location in a 2016 list of "our favorite 11 new cafes and roasters in Portland". Samantha Bakall included the business in The Oregonian's 2017 list of the ten best coffee shops in downtown Portland.

== See also ==
- List of coffeehouse chains
