= Hugh Atkin =

Australian lawyer and content creator

Hugh Atkin is an Australian lawyer and notable producer of Internet viral videos. Atkin began producing videos for YouTube in 2007, and his videos have appeared on the Australian Broadcasting Corporation's Unleashed website.

== Early life and education ==
Atkin studied law and arts at the University of Sydney. While he was a student, he began to create and post videos on Australian and American politics, as well as current events. One popular video posted during the 2007 Australian federal election depicted Kevin Rudd in a mock propaganda film based on material produced by the Chinese Communist Party during the rule of Mao Zedong. He appeared on ABC television political program Insiders on 16 March 2008 as part of the "Talking Pictures" segment.

== Career ==
Atkin has created several popular YouTube videos related to the 2008 US President election. His video entitled "BarackRoll", including Barack Obama in a parody of the Rickrolling internet meme, has been watched over seven million times since it was uploaded on 9 August 2008, and was also highlighted on blogs for The New York Times, Politico, Comedy Central, Andrew Sullivan and Sports Illustrated.

He previously worked as a lawyer for Mallesons Stephen Jaques, an Australian commercial law firm, and was subsequently employed as a Tipstaff at the Supreme Court of New South Wales.
