= Next Up (organization) =

Progressive political organization in Oregon, US

- Formation: 2001
- Type: Non-profit Organization
- Headquarters: Portland, Oregon, United States
- Website: https://nextuporegon.org/
- Formerly called: The Bus Project

Next Up, formerly known as The Bus Project, is a non-profit organization that aims to amplify the voices and leadership of diverse young people in Oregon, helping them improve the state. For over two decades, Next Up has collaborated with youth activists to work towards their stated goal of achieving a more just and equitable state through civic engagement.

== History and influence ==
Next Up was founded in 2001 as The Bus Project. Next Up volunteers canvassed voters around the state in both the 2004 and 2006 Oregon elections. After the 2004 election, the Oregon State Senate flipped from Republican to Democratic control, and similarly, after the 2006 election, the Oregon House of Representatives also flipped to Democratic control.

== Voter engagement ==
=== Building Votes ===
Building Votes is the non-profit, non-partisan voter registration arm of Next Up. It aims to assist citizens under the age of 30 in registering to vote and to educate them about major issues and politics. In the 2006 election cycle, Building Votes registered 20,000 new voters in Oregon, in an election that saw an overall 6% increase in the size of the under-30 electorate in Oregon.

=== Trick-Or-Vote ===
Trick or Vote, Next Up's Halloween canvass, witnessed a turnout of over 800 people to volunteer for half a day in 2004 and over 500 people for the mid-term election in 2006. Trick-Or-Vote is a mass costumed canvass event to get out the vote, followed by an evening of entertainment and music. It has been employed by other civic-focused organizations from Montana to Florida.

=== PolitiCorps ===
During the summer of 2005, the Next Up Fellowship Program, PolitiCorps was launched, providing opportunities for 13 college students and recent graduates, and featuring a curriculum of over 50 speakers from across the political spectrum. The following summer, the program expanded to 22 fellows, and in 2007, it was expanded to its current size of 24 fellows.

PolitiCorps is a political immersion program that provides young people, 'fellows', interested in politics with skills training, policy courses, and intensive fieldwork. These courses include campaign management training, public speaking and debate, political messaging and media courses, and more. Fellows spend a significant amount of their time conducting fieldwork with partner programs, directly involved in state and local races, working to increase urban youth voter registration and participation, and organizing Bus trips to swing districts to canvass for progressive candidates. The program seeks to educate fellows on the intricacies of state politics using Oregon as a model. In addition, it is designed to help them take these lessons and connect them to national politics.

=== "Vote, F*cker" ===
Next Up's "Vote, F*cker" T-shirt merchandize has received national media attention in numerous newspapers and magazines. The shirts were first created as a response to an Urban Outfitters' shirt with the slogan "Voting is for Old People".

== Debates ==
The Candidates Gone Wild local debates in Portland, Oregon drew over 2000 people, the largest local debates in the state. Co-hosted with the Willamette Week newspaper, the event pushes local and statewide candidates outside the box for a lively and irreverent night of film, music, animation, performance, and debate. The BrewHaHa is the regular public forum on local issues co-hosted with the Portland Mercury in Portland and with Eugene Weekly in Lane County.

== BusPAC ==
The BusPAC has canvassed swing legislative districts on behalf of select progressive candidates running for state legislative races. Nine out of the ten State Senate candidates they have supported have won. One won by a margin of forty votes; each BusPAC volunteer knocked on more doors than that in a single day.

== More information ==
=== Bus Project Slogans ===
- Not left, not right, but forward.
- Volunteer.
- Engage. Educate. Elect.
- Exact Change
- Vote, F*cker!
- Trick or Vote!
- Making politics fun again
- Get on the Bus!
- We're not just asking people to vote, we're asking them to change the world
- Smart and Funny is better than stupid and boring. But if you have to pick, stupid is better than boring.

=== Legal status ===
Next Up comprises three organizations, each of which operates under a different section of U.S. and state tax and election laws:

1. The New Progressive Network, a 501(c)(4) organization, primarily focuses on education and advocacy on important statewide issues. Under U.S. tax laws, a 501(c)(4) organization can engage in lobbying for legislative change but is not allowed to intervene in political campaigns in support of or opposition to any candidate for public office.
2. BusPAC, an Oregon state PAC, primarily helps members elect candidates who reflect the organization's progressive values. Unlike 501(c)(4) organizations, PACs are allowed to directly support individual candidates.
3. The Oregon Progress Forum, a 501(c)(3) organization, registers young voters.
