= Holler (restaurant) =

Defunct restaurant in Portland, Oregon, U.S.

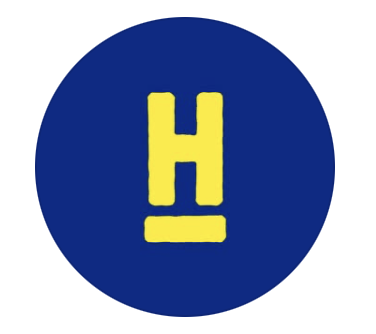
- Interactive map of Holler

Restaurant information
- Established: 2020
- Closed: February 26, 2023
- Owner: Holler Hospitality
- Location: 7119 Southeast Milwaukie Avenue, Portland, Multnomah, Oregon, 97202, United States
- Coordinates: 45.4728°N 122.6488°W

Holler was a bar and restaurant in Portland, Oregon, United States. Holler was owned by the restaurant group Holler Hospitality, which has also owned local establishments Abigail Hall and Bullard Tavern.

Holler's planned June 2020 launch was impacted by the COVID-19 pandemic; the restaurant initially operated from a food cart before accepting take-out orders in July 2020 and offering dine-in service in April 2021. Holler closed permanently in February 2023.

== Description ==
The family-friendly sports bar and restaurant Holler operated on Milwaukie Avenue in southeast Portland's Sellwood-Moreland neighborhood. Interior features included an arcade, felt accents, scoreboards with bright lights, trophies and other sports memorabilia on shelves, varsity lettering on bar stools, and roller skates and a storage container as a nod to the nearby Oaks Park Roller Skating Rink.

The menu included fried chicken, smash burgers, a meatloaf sandwich, cornbread, salads (including cabbage and Caesar varieties), ice cream and cocktails. Holler also served mini corn dogs, jalapeño poppers, pork cigars with carrots, mushrooms, and jalapeño jelly, as well as bruschetta with feta, herbs, olives, and tomatoes. The chicken fried trout sandwich had butter lettuce, dill mayonnaise, jalapeño jelly, and pickles on Texas toast. Other burger options included a veggie burger and a cheeseburger with chili and jalapeños. Holler served beer in "old-school, stadium-style" hard plastic cups, according to KGW.

== History ==
In November 2019, Eater Portland described plans for business partners Doug Adams and Jen Quist of Bullard Tavern to open Holler in 2020, serving buttermilk-brined fried chicken in the ground floor of the Meetinghouse apartment building. Holler's planned June 2020 launch was impacted by the arrival of the COVID-19 pandemic. The restaurant initially operated from a food cart and participated in a series of pop-ups. Holler began accepting take-out orders in July 2020 and started offering indoor dining service in April 2021.

Later in 2021, Adams stepped away from Holler and other restaurants operated by Holler Hospitality. In February 2023, Holler announced plans to close permanently on February 26. A social media post read in part, "Sadly our industry has become all too familiar with this story, but opening during Covid and managing all that comes along with it as a brand new business, we did all we could, for as long as we could."

=== Holler Treats ===
Quist launched Holler Treats in August 2021, serving cakes, cookies, pies, and other desserts in a space next to Holler. In June 2022, Holler Treats relaunched as an ice cream parlor with an expanded menu including milkshakes and sundaes. Sundae options include a banana split and a cereal bowl version with vanilla ice cream, Fruity Pebbles, marshmallows, strawberry sauce, and homemade whipped cream. Ice cream flavors include banana caramel streusel, maple pecan, malted milk chocolate, peanut butter and raspberry, raspberry matcha, and vanilla bean. Pie varieties included apple streusel, banana pudding, bourbon pecan, lemon meringue, and pumpkin made with squash. Holler Treats also offered a strawberry rhubarb sorbet and packaged candies such as gummy bears and other gummies as well as jelly beans by Jelly Belly. Janey Wong at Eater Portland said Holler Treats had a "whimsical, candy-colored" interior and remained connected to Holler by an open door. Danielle Bailey was the executive pastry chef.

Continuing to operate after Holler closed in 2023, Holler Treats closed permanently on January 21, 2024. A closing announcement read, "All sweet things must sadly come to an end. In the midst of the challenges the pandemic brought to the restaurant industry, opening and sustaining a new business during these times was no small feat. After two and a half years, we are grateful for the memories we've shared on our little corner in Sellwood."

== Reception ==
Michael Russell ranked Holler number eleven in The Oregonian's 2021 list of Portland's thirteen best smash burgers.
