= Roseline Coffee =

Coffee company based in Portland, Oregon, U.S.

Logo

Exterior of the location in northeast Portland, Oregon, 2025

Roseline Coffee is a coffee company based in Portland, Oregon, United States. Established in 2012, the business operates seven locations in the Portland metropolitan area, as of 2026.

== Description ==
Roseline Coffee operates multiple locations in the Portland metropolitan area. The business's name is a nod to Portland's nickname as the "City of Roses". Roseline's headquarters in northeast Portland has a showroom and training space called Session Room. Eater Portland has said the flagship location has "laid-back attitude and light-filled room".

=== Menu ===
Honduras Las Flores is among Roseline's varieties. Roseline has offered seasonal options. In 2024, the business served a black sesame caramel latte, a boo berry latte (with dried blueberry-infused cream and Boo Berry marshmallow cereal), a fall thyme matcha soda and a pumpkin pie latte.

== History and locations ==
Sign outside the Woodlark Hotel location in downtown Portland, Oregon, 2025

Roseline launched in October 2012. The business started with a 1.5-kilo Proaster and upgraded to a 10-kilo Proaster in 2013. In 2014, Sprudge described the business as "a tiny, cutting-edge coffee roasting operation ". Marty Lopes was the owner-operator at the time. Early on, Roseline roasted coffee at Yale Union. Either/Or served Roseline, as of 2013.

Roseline expanded in 2015 with more operational space, a training center, a quality control lab, and a brewing education center. The business was supplying local restaurants and coffee shops including Good Coffee, Luce, Never Coffee, Prince Coffee, and St. Jack. Roseline opened its first brick-and-mortar cafe in Portland in 2018.

Roseline opened its fifth location on Boones Ferry Road in April 2024. The business opened its seventh location in Montgomery Park in 2025. An eighth location is slated to open on East Burnside Street, in the northeast Portland part of the Kerns neighborhood, in 2026. The space previously operated as a Starbucks location. Roseline also operates in the KOIN Tower and the Woodlark Hotel in downtown Portland.

Keith Schuman is a co-owner of Roseline. Before the arrival of the COVID-19 pandemic, Roseline hosted prix fixe pop-ups by Suckerpunch, which served non-alcoholic cocktails. In 2025, Roseline partnered with Salt & Straw on a flavor for a cookbook by the ice cream company's co-founder Tyler Malek.

== Reception ==
In 2017, Jordan Michelman of Willamette Week described the Honduras Las Flores variety as "a washed coffee that tastes like the boysenberry syrup at IHOP". Paolo Bicchieri included Roseline in Eater Portland's 2025 list of the city's best cafes for free Wi-Fi and remote work. The business was a finalist in the 'Outstanding Design Achievement: Café / Roasting Facility' and 'Outstanding Packaging: Whole Bean Coffee' categories of Sprudge's second annual design awards in 2025.

== See also ==
- List of restaurant chains in the United States
