= Breasted =

Breasted may refer to:

- James Henry Breasted, American archaeologist and historian
- Single-breasted, garment such as coat or jacket with one column of buttons
- Double-breasted, garment such as coat or jacket with two columns of buttons
