= Wallie Herzer =

American songwriter

- Born: Walter Henry Herzer; April 15, 1885; San Francisco
- Died: October 15, 1961 (aged 76); Redwood City, California
- Occupations: Ragtime composer; songwriter; pianist
- Years active: 1908–1942
- Spouse: Sylvia née Scalmanini (m. 1885–1955)

Wallie Herzer (né Walter Henry Herzer; 15 April 1885 San Francisco – 15 October 1961 Redwood City, California) was an American composer of popular music, music publisher, and pianist. Herzer flourished in music prior to and during World War I.

The Columbia recording of his 1912 composition, "Everybody Two-Step" — performed by ragtime pianist Mike Bernard on December 2, 1912, in New York City — is the first recording of ragtime music. It became a hit and coincided with the start of a renewed craze for ragtime and dance — fifteen years after William Krell's "Mississippi Rag" had been published, the first known published piece of music with "rag" in the title.

Herzer composed three other hits — a 1913 piano rag, "Tickle the Ivories" – which also became a hit as a vocal arrangement; a 1914 foxtrot song, "Get Over, Sal"; and a 1916 Hawaiian waltz song, "Aloha Land". Other compositions — including his 1908 piano ragtime two-step and barn dance, "The Rah-Rah Boy", and his 1913 rag turkey trot, "Let's Dance" — were internationally distributed.

== Career ==
Of the 13 compositions by Herzer in the United States copyright records, there are 8 extant musical scores in national, academic, civic, and private libraries. The number of piano rolls and recordings of 4 of those works far exceeds the number of compositions. As of 2014, at least 2 of Herzer's works are included in the repertoire of ragtime artists today.

Herzer published his music while working for insurance agencies in San Francisco. Beginning 1901, when he was 16, until about 1904, Herzer was a clerk for insurance agents Gutte & Frank (Isidor Gutte; 1833–1908; Julius Gutte; 1828–1900; and William Frank; 1839–19??). From 1904 to 1920, Herzer was an insurance adjustor and broker for Christensen & Goodwin (Charles H. Christensen; 1839–1921; & Benjamin Frank Goodwin; 1859–1945) at 241 Sansome Street — the same address as his publishing company. From 1920 to 1924, he was the manager of the city department (in San Francisco) for Bentley & Waterman (Leroy Vernon Bentley; 1883–1932; & Clyde Waterman; 1868–1950). In 1924, Herzer became the manager of the city department (in San Francisco) for Glens Falls Insurance Company, headquartered in Glens Falls, New York.

Music critic Winthrop Sargeant, in 1975, stated that the best ragtime came from outside New York and he cited Herzer & Brown, Wallie's first publishing company, as being among publishers of some of the best and most imaginative rags. The title of Herzer's 1914 composition, "Get Over, Sal", was a turn-of-the-19th-century African-American expression for a slow-drag dance step that was incorporated in a variation of the fox trot. The expression had been published in an earlier song, "Music Hall Song", copyrighted 1879 — popularized by Jenny Hill, the 'Vital Spark':

You may get over water-butts,
You may get over fountains,
But I'll take particular notice
That you don't get over Sal.

A song rendition of "Everybody Two-Step", published in 1913, became a popular hit in vaudeville. The solo piano and song versions of "Everybody Two-Step", his 1913 composition, "Tickle The Ivories", and his 1916 composition, "Aloha Land", were hits as well.

== Selected compositions ==
- "The Rah-Rah Boy"; ragtime two-step and barn dance, for solo piano

Jerome H. Remick & Co. (Remick), publisher (1908 & 1911); OCLC 81894686, 843076603

Music Herzer, arranged by Eugene Brown
Cover: caricature of a male college student smoking a pipe with bulldog; illustrated by L.S. Morgan (né Leland Stanford Morgan; 1886–1981) (view)

© November 18, 1908, Class C 194109, Herzer & Brown, San Francisco (Note: Vol. 3, Part 2, July–December 1908, Nos. 27–52 (1908), pg. 1114)
© Transferred to Jerome H. Remick & Co. ("Remick"), Detroit & New York, 1911

"Rah-rah boy", in that era, was a reference to a college male. The class of '09 is illustrated on his pipe and sweater. One of the colors, blue, the bulldog, and the scull and bones insignia — taken as a composite — fits a profile of a Yale student.

- "My Portola Maid"; song

Herzer, publisher (1909); OCLC 60555517
© August 2, 1909, 2nd copy August 7, 1909, Class E 213111, Wallie Herzer (Note: Vol. 4, Part 1, July 1909, Nos. 26–30 (1909), pg. 809)

- "Everybody Two-Step"

Remick, New York, Detroit, publisher (1911); OCLC 793326485, 9968568

Cover: caricature of a jolly minstrel or busker banjoist with one or two missing teeth, seated in morning dress: single-breasted black frock coat with notched red-trimmed lapels, red, white, and black-striped top collar, red-trimmed sleeves, lined with single white French-cuffs; white vest; black-and-white checkered bow-tie with matching black-and-white checkered trousers trimmed with white gaiters; gemstone centered on upper shirt- or vest-front below the bow tie; black cap-toe dress shoes with white-stitched welts, topped with red, white, and black striped spats that match the top collar; black top hat with red patterned hat band on ground, brim up, casting a shadow; red background, black lettering, white base — illustrated by L.S. Morgan, 1910 (view) (2nd view)

Remick, New York, Detroit, publisher

Cover: full-page, center, ornamental stemmed cocktail glass (pseudo early-art deco), illustration by Starmer?? (#5 view)

Remick, publisher (1911); OCLC 10722614

For dance orchestra
Arranged by Ribe Danmark, pseudonym of J. Bodewalt Lampe, staff arranger for Remick

Remick, publisher (1912); OCLC 9677063

Cover: portrait of Miss Nellie Beaumont is by Starmer; "As sung by Miss Nellie Beaumont in A Lucky Hoodoo", a musical review directed by Billy B. Van that toured nationwide between 1911 and 1912 (view)

© June 30, 1910; 2 c. July 7, 1910, Class E (musical composition) 235359, Wallie Herzer, San Francisco (Note: Vol. 5, May–October 1910, Nos. 18–43 (1910), pg. 1042)
© June 10, 1910, Class E (musical composition) 235359; notice received January 4, 2011, recorded Vol. 1, pg. 85, Wallie Herzer, San Francisco (Note: Vol. 6, Part 1, January 1911 (1911), pg. 120)
© Renewal 61361, January 10, 1938, Wallie Herzer, San Francisco (Note: Vol. 33, Part 1, First Half of 1938, Nos. 1–9 (1938), pg. 77)

- "Tickle The Ivories", Rag

Remick, publisher (1913)

Solo piano version
Cover: man playing piano, illustrated by Starmer (view)

Remick, publisher (1912); OCLC 368072760, 498722519

Song version
Music by Herzer, words by Earle C. Jones (1878–1913)

Remick, publisher (1913); OCLC 34883547

Music by Wallie Herzer; arranged by James C. McCabe (who sometimes used the pseudonym, Emmet Balfmoor); staff arranger for Remick

© January 25, 1913; 2nd copy January 27, 1913; Class E (musical composition) 304389, Remick, New York (Note: Vol. 8, Part 1, First Half of 1913, Nos. 1–7 (1913), pg. 109)
© July 22, 1913; 2nd copy July 26, 1913, Class E (musical composition) 315301, Remick, New York (Note: Vol. 8, Part 1, First Half of 1913, Nos. 1–7 (1913), pg. 877)
© Renewal 89003 July 26, 1940, Wallie Herzer, San Francisco & Sally Starr, Detroit (Note: Vol. 35, Part 2, Last Half of 1940, Nos. 6–12 (1941), pg. 1080)

- "Let's dance"; a rag turkey trot

Remick, publisher (1913); OCLC 47639727

Cover: 5 couples dancing, yellow, blue, and black colors, illustrated by Starmer (view)

© December 29, 1913; 2nd copy January 2, 1914; Class E (musical composition) 328852, Remick, New York (Note: Vol. 9, Part 1, First Half of 1914, Nos. 1–7 (1914), pg. 18)

- "Get Over, Sal"; fox trot, one-step, two-step

Remick, publisher (1914); OCLC 781321475

Cover: black, orange and white colors – eleven couples dancing with a waiter carrying cocktails, illustrated by L.S. Morgan

Charles N. Daniels, San Francisco, publisher (1914); OCLC 47810977

Cover: black, orange, and white – eleven couples dancing with a waiter carrying cocktails, illustrated by L.S. Morgan (view)

© December 5, 1914, 2nd copy December 12, 1914, Class E (musical composition) 354304 (Note: Vol. 9, Part 2, Last Half of 1914, Nos. 8–13 (1914), pg. 1529)
© Transferred to Charles N. Daniels 1914
© Renewal 111003, August 25, 1942, Wallie Herzer, San Francisco (Note: Vol. 37, Part 2, Last Half of 1942, No. 8 (1942), pg. 1412)

- "Dance With Me"; hesitation waltz

Wallie Herzer, publisher (1914); OCLC 778806566, 42677999

Cover: purple and white colors – man and woman (in pantomime dress) dancing, illustrated by L.S. Morgan

© December 5, 1914, 2nd copy December 12, 1914, Class E (musical composition) 354303 (Note: Vol. 9, Part 2, Last Half of 1914, Nos. 8–13 (1914), pg. 1518)
© Renewal 111002 August 25, 1942, Wallie Herzer, San Francisco (Note: Vol. 37, Part 2, Last Half of 1942, No. 8 (1942), pg. 101)

- "Aloha Land"; Hawaiian waltz song

Miller Music, New York, publisher (©1916, ©1918); OCLC 779881675

Words by W. Eager, music by Herzer

Sherman, Clay & Co., San Francisco, publisher, (©1916, ©1918); OCLC 779881686

Cover: illustrated by Wesley Raymond De Lappe (1887–1952) (view)

Sherman, Clay & Co., San Francisco, publisher, (©1916); OCLC 42683929

Music by Herzer, arrangement by Julius Lee Burbeck (1870–1949)

© December 26. 1916; 2nd copy January 2, 1917; Class E 396686, Sherman Clay & Co., San Francisco (Note: Vol. 12, Part 1, First Half of 1917, Nos. 1–7 (1917), pg. 48)
© Renewal 131717, Sept. 11, 1944, by Herzer (Note: Vol. 39, Part 2, Last Half of 1944, Nos. 7–12, (1944), pg. 1255)

- "Woman's Ways"; a musical satire

Piano score

Book by Sue Conly Posner (Susan Conleigh; 1886–1976), music by Herzer

© 30 August 1917; Class E (musical composition) 407665, Wallie Herzer, San Francisco (Note: Vol. 12, Part 2, Last Half of 1917, Nos. 8–13 (1917), pg. 856)
© Renewal 134351; December 5, 1944, Wallie Herzer, San Francisco (Note: Vol. 40, Part 1, For the Year 1945, Nos. 1–5 (1945), pg. 603)

- "Come On To San Francisco"

© February 11, 1938, Class E unpublished 160814, Wallie Herzer, San Francisco (Note: Vol. 33, Part 1, First Half of 1938, Nos. 1–9 (1938), pg. 106)

- "Sky Rocket, Boom, Ah", song

Unpublished
© October 21, 1940, Class E (musical composition) unpublished 234680 (Note: Vol. 35, Part 2, Last Half of 1940, Nos. 6–12 (1941), pg. 1446)

- "Now and Always"; song

Wallie Herzer, publisher
© February 24, 1942, Class E (musical composition) unpublished 286391, Wallie Herzer, San Francisco (Note: Vol. 37, Part 1, First Half of 1942, Nos. 1–6 (1942), pg. 242)
© May 10, 1942, Class E (musical composition) published 104565, Wallie Herzer, San Francisco (Note: Vol. 37, Part 1, First Half of 1942, Nos. 1–6 (1942), pg. 792)

- "Dish It Out"

Walter Herzer, San Francisco

Lyrics & Music by Herzer

© November 19, 1942; Class E (musical composition) unpublished 315633, Walter Herzer, San Francisco (Note: Vol. 37, Part 2, Last Half of 1942, No. 8 (1942), pg. 1762)

== Selected piano rollography ==
- "Everybody Two-Step"

Angelus 25963 (matrix) (65 note roll)
Angelus 90912 (matrix) (1912) (audio)
Connorized Music Co. 2173 (matrix)
Connorized Music Co. 3829 (matrix)
Full Scale 14923 (matrix)
Kimball F-6263 (matrix) (m), Popular Song Hits #2
Kimball C-6164 (matrix)
QRS 31027 (matrix)
Rhythmodik B-5252 (matrix) Fred A. Schmitz
Royal 4300 (matrix)
Supertone 695418 (matrix) (65 note roll)
Supertone 845418 (matrix)
Universal 99845 (matrix)
Universal 94505 (matrix) (m), "Rag Medley #11"
US Music 65500 (matrix) (m), "States Medley #5"
US Music 64518 (matrix)
Virtuoso 81014 (matrix)
Vocalstyle 1530 (matrix)

- "Aloha Land"

Pianostyle 46198 (matrix)

== Selected discography ==
- "Everybody Two-Step", (instrumental version), Mike Bernard, piano (1912); OCLC 4536144

Columbia A-1266
38467-1 (matrix)
Reissues (i) Vintage Jazz Mart (Europe) VLP2 & (ii) Smithsonian Folkways RF24
Recorded in New York City December 2, 1912 (audio on YouTube)

- "Everybody Two-Step", Victor Military Band; OCLC 277021178

Victor Records B-12779 (matrix)
Recorded January 9, 1913 (audio)

- "Everybody Two-Step"

Billy Murray, vocalist
Edison cylinder (1912) audio on YouTube

- "Everybody Two-Step"

Chrysanthemum Ragtime Band, Dancing on the Edge of the World, Stomp Off Records (1987); OCLC 19972811
Recorded at Bay Records, Berkeley, California
Re-released by Stomp Off Records, The Preserves, Vol. 1 (1992); OCLC 28012058

- "Everybody Two-Step"

Johnny Maddox, Très moutarde: Johnny Maddox Plays Rags, Blues, Waltzes, and Ballads, Paragon Productions SG-102 (1977); OCLC 464114545
Recorded in 1975 in Denver, Colorado
Re-released by Crazy Otto Music, Sunflower Slow Drag (CD) (2005); OCLC 262685584

- "Aloha Land"

6229-A-4-10 (matrix); OCLC 79072004
Waikiki Hawaiian Orchestra, with Helen Louise & Frank Ferera
Edison 50635

- "Aloha Land"

G07326 (matrix); OCLC 56353527
Frank Ferera & Anthony Franchini (Hawaiian guitars), George Hamilton Green (xylophone)
Gennett 9000 Series 9076A
Recorded July 1920

== Addresses ==
Publishing Company

- Wallie Herzer, 241 Sansome Street, San Francisco

Residences

- 1917–1937: 2360 Vallejo, San Francisco (Pacific Heights)
- 1944–1955: 1801 Carmelita Avenue, Burlingame, San Mateo County, California
- 1955–1961: 759 Roble Avenue, Menlo Park, California

== Social and professional affiliations ==
- The Olympic Club, San Francisco

Wheelman (competitive bicyclist)

- 1921: Fire Underwriters' Association of the Pacific
- 1919: Plate Glass Underwriters Association of California, executive committee
- 1902: Amateur competitive tennis player

== Family ==
Parents

Wallie Herzer's father, Hugo Herzer, Sr. (1845–1921), was born and raised in Bavaria, Germany, and emigrated to the United States in 1865. His mother, Elizabeth (née Ulrich; 1855–1923) was born and raised in France, and emigrated to the United States in 1860. Hugo, Sr. was engaged in civic service for the City of San Francisco, namely as Deputy Tax Assessor from about 1891 to 1901, then City Cashier in 1902 of the License Department of the Tax Assessor, and in 1905, Expert Searcher, Tax Office of San Francisco. Hugo, Sr., was also a member and officer of the Turners and also, a member of the German-American Republican Club of San Francisco, as well as the Grant and Wilson Club.

Siblings

Wallie was the youngest of five siblings. One of his two brothers, Hugo G. Herzer, Jr. (1879–1921), was an operatic vocal instructor in Honolulu, teaching at the Honolulu School of Dramatic Art from about 1902 to 1918. Hugo studied voice with Francis W. Stuart (1865–1939) at The King Conservatory of Music (Frank Louis King; 1854–1914) in San Jose in 1899. Hugo was a pedagogical exponent of Francesco Lamperti. Hugo married Agnes Lovell Lyle (1887–1951) on March 2, 1907, in Honolulu. Agnes was a soprano, pianist, and piano teacher. In 1918, they both resettled in San Francisco. After the death of Hugo, Jr., in 1921, Agnes remarried Robert Montgomery Gehl (1888–1971).

Spouse

Wallie married Sylvia (née Scalmanini; 1885–1955) in San Francisco on May 4, 1910. Sylvia's father, Carlo Scalmanini (1820–1891), had been a California Forty-Niner, a major vineyard owner-winemaker, co-owner, with Baptiste Frapolli (Italian spelling, Battiste; 1821–1890), of the Swiss Republic Restaurant at 19 Long Wharf, and a wholesale and retail grocer. Wallie and Sylvia had one child, a daughter — Harriett C. Herzer (1911–1999) — who married Colin Arthur Moreton (1910–1991).
