= Bullard Tavern =

Restaurant in Portland, Oregon, U.S.

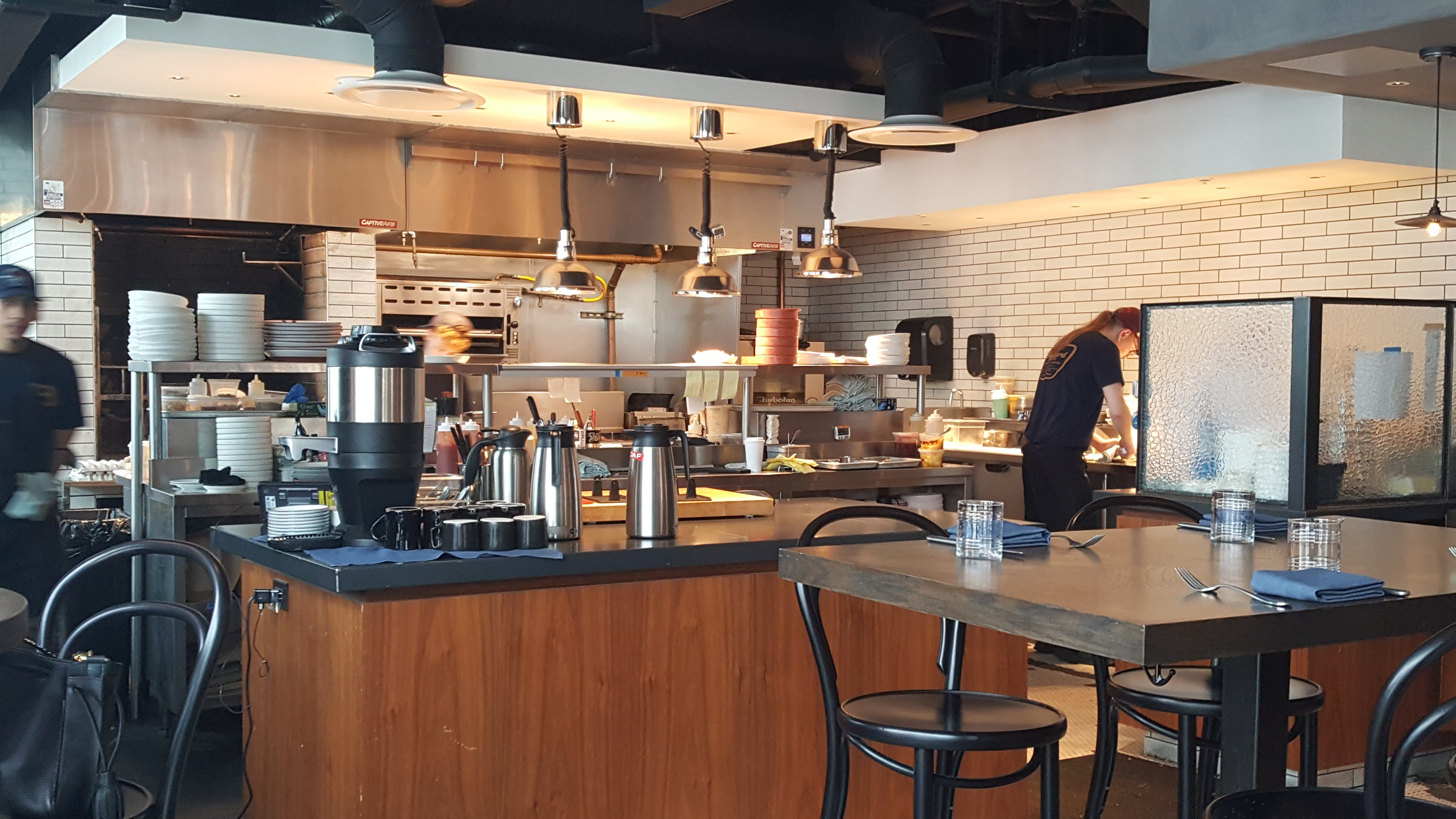
- The restaurant's kitchen, 2022
- Interactive map of Bullard Tavern

Restaurant information
- Location: 813 Southwest Alder Street, Portland, Multnomah, Oregon, 97205, United States
- Coordinates: 45.5205°N 122.6805°W
- Website: bullardpdx.com

Bullard Tavern, or simply Bullard, is a restaurant in Portland, Oregon, United States.

== Description and history ==
Doug Adams' plans to open Bullard in downtown Portland's Woodlark Hotel were announced in 2016. The restaurant, named after his hometown in East Texas, opened in December 2018. Brooke Jackson-Glidden of Eater Portland described Bullard as "a meat restaurant, with some vegetables, a handful of fish dishes, but overarchingly, tons of methodically selected cuts of local beef, pork, and lamb". The restaurant began serving brunch in 2019. Zoi Antonitsas completed a summer residency at Bullard Tavern in 2023.

== Reception ==
In 2019, Bullard was a Design of the Year finalist in Eater Portland's annual Eater Awards. The website's Daniel Barnett included the restaurant in a 2020 list of the city's ten "buzziest new breakfasts and brunches". Jackson-Glidden included Bullard in a 2020 overview of recommended eateries in Portland for bachelorette parties, and Nick Woo included the restaurant in a 2020 list of fourteen "outstanding" fried chicken sandwiches in the city. The business was included in Eater Portland's 2022 overview of recommended restaurants in downtown Portland.

Jordan Michelman of Portland Monthly included Bullard in a 2022 list of the Portland area's "very best" chicken wings.
