= Prince Coffee =

Coffee shop in Portland, Oregon, U.S.

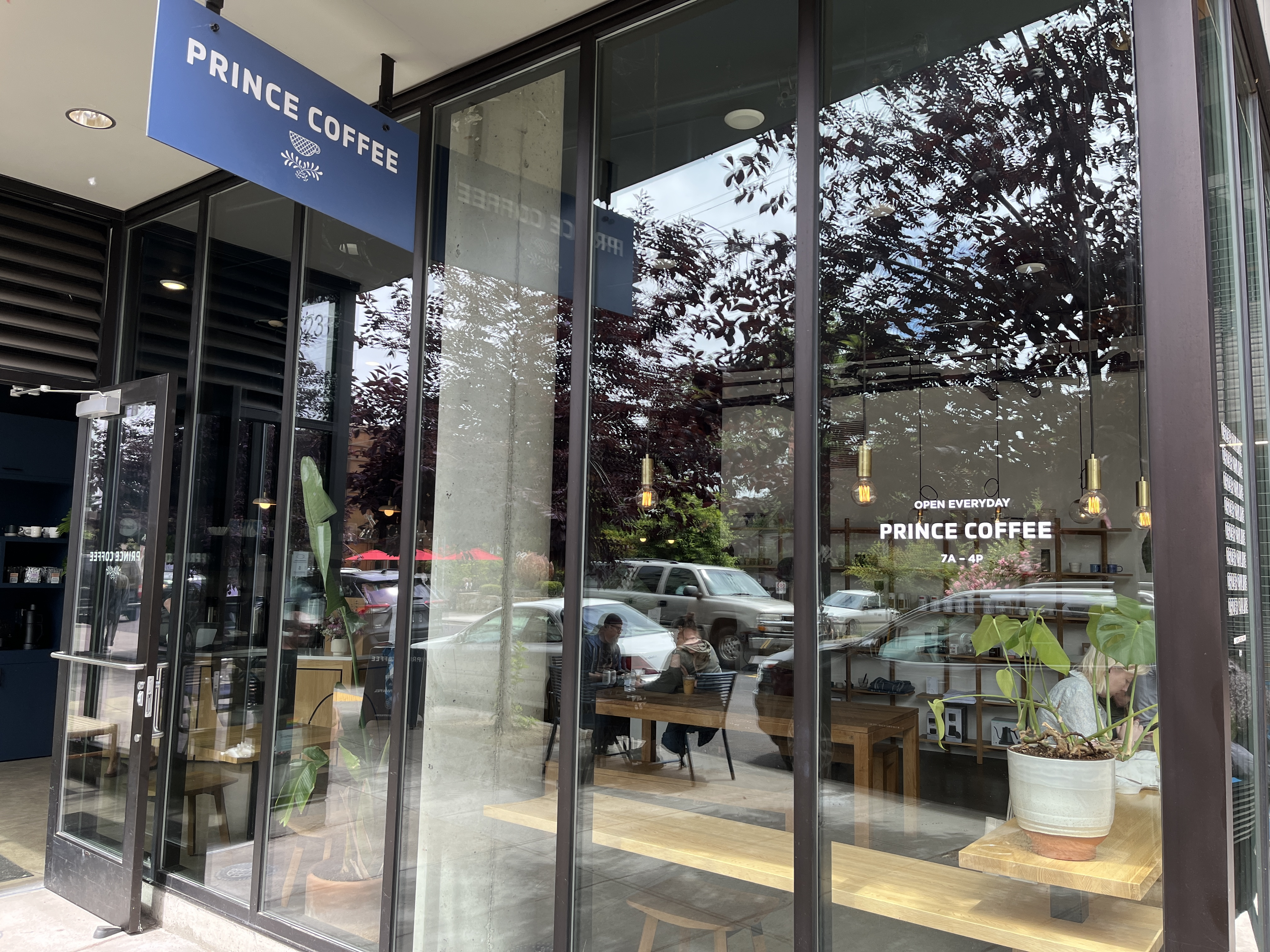
- Exterior of the shop in northeast Portland, Oregon, in 2022
- Interactive map of Prince Coffee

Restaurant information
- Location: Portland, Oregon, United States
- Coordinates: 45.5295°N 122.6908°W
- Website: princecoffee.com

Prince Coffee is a coffee shop in Portland, Oregon, United States.

== Description and history ==
Owner Katie Prinsen opened Prince Coffee in north Portland's Kenton neighborhood in 2016, serving coffees by Coava and Roseline as well as stroopwafels. A grand opening was held on April 9, during which 200 free stroopwafels were given to the first 200 customers.

In 2018, Eater Portland's Nick Woo said "a neighborhood fire put the beautiful Beaumont location of Prince Coffee out of commission recently" and acknowledged its reopening. He described the space as "Dutch-inspired" and noted that the menu included Proud Mary and Roseline mochas with Cloudforest chocolate, as well as kombucha on tap. A Schoolhouse location in northwest Portland opened in June 2019. Willamette Week has described Prince Coffee as "an extremely photogenic, Dutch-inspired coffee shop" with a "Scandinavian minimalist" aesthetic.

== Reception ==
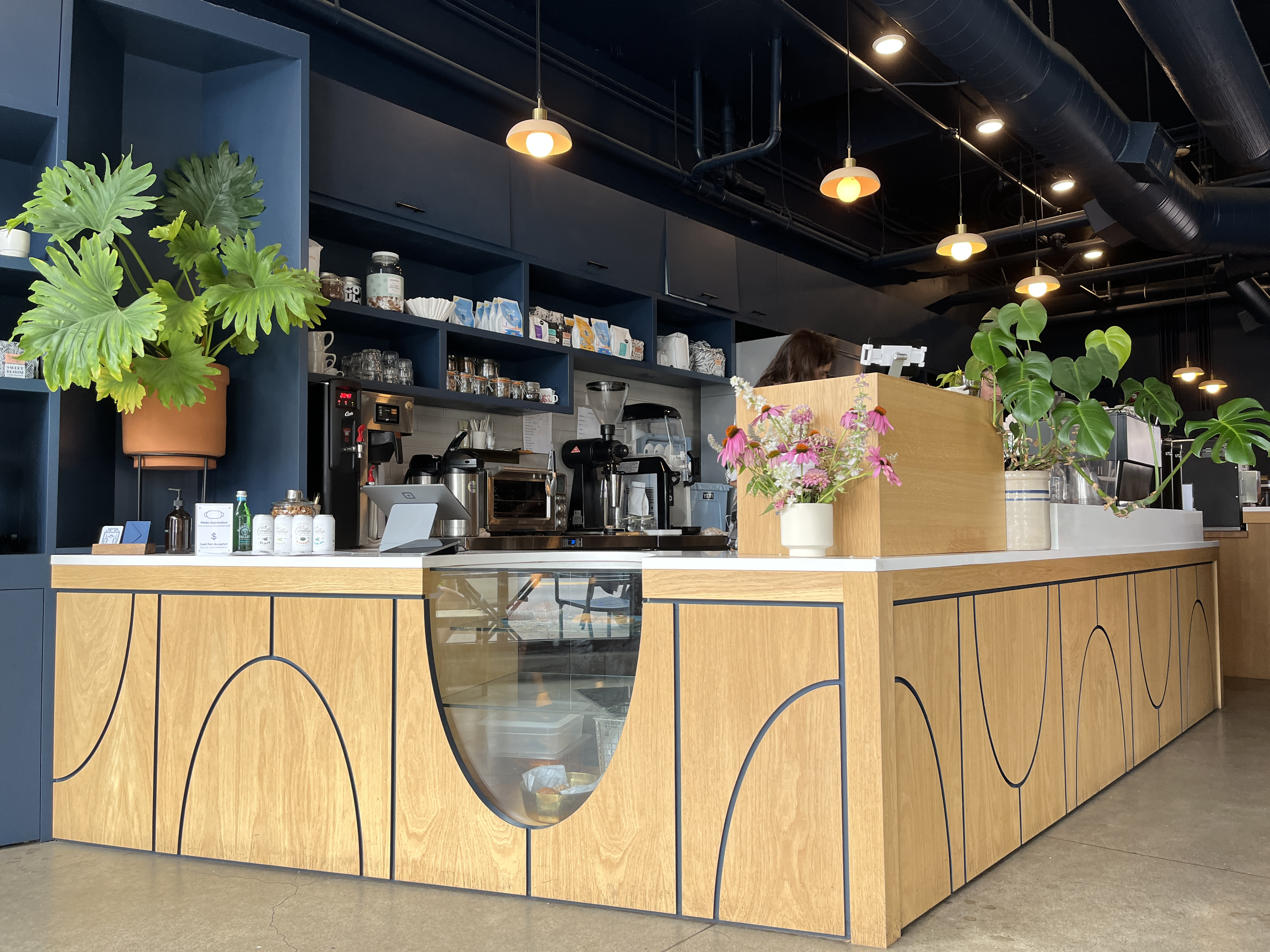
The Beaumont-Wilshire shop's interior, 2022

Willamette Week named Prince Coffee a favorite new coffee shop in 2016. Ben Waterhouse included the business in The Oregonian's 2017 list of "Portland's 5 most innovative new coffee shops". Nick Woo included Prince Coffee in Eater Portland's 2018 list of "Outstanding Portland Coffee Shops with Free Wi-Fi". The website's Seiji Nanbu included the business in a 2020 overview of the city's best "go-to" hot chocolates, writing: "While Beaumont's Prince may be known mostly for its stroopwafels, the hot chocolate here is an excellent companion for them. Chocolate drinks here use single-origin chocolate from local chocolatier Cloudforest, which used to have their own cafe in Southeast Portland (R.I.P.). The flavor, then, is rich and dark, with exceptional nuance that comes from meticulous sourcing."
