= Leland Stanford Morgan =

Leland Stanford Morgan (aka Le Morgan; 9 June 1886 San Francisco – 12 August 1981 Oakland, California) was an American commercial artist. He began in 1910 in San Francisco and eventually moved across the bay to Oakland where he remained for the rest of his life. Morgan is known for his illustrations of sheet music covers by publishers mostly in the San Francisco Bay area.

== Career ==
At age 17, Morgan graduated from the California Business College in San Francisco in December 1903. In 1930, Morgan began teaching Fashion Art and Commercial Art at the Fox Art Institute and School of Commercial Art, founded in 1921 in Oakland by Elton Villers Frederick Fox (1893–1970). In 1930, when he began teaching there, they renamed it the Fox-Morgan Art Institute and Commercial Art School. Fox returned to his native home in Victoria, Australia, in 1935, and Ruel Curtis Dean became associated with the school for two years. In 1937, the school was renamed Art Institute on the 3rd floor at 339 15th Street, Oakland, and Morgan became its head. Notable alumni of the Fox-Morgan School include Dong Kingman.

== Selected sheet music covers ==
Jerome H. Remick & Co., Detroit, New York

- "The Rah-Rah Boy" (1908 & 1911); OCLC 81894686, 843076603

Music by Wallie Herzer, arranged by Eugene Brown
Cover: caricature of a male college student smoking a pipe with bulldog; "Rah-rah boy" was a reference to a college male. The class of '09 is illustrated on his pipe and sweater. One of the colors, blue, the bulldog, and the scull and bones insignia — taken as a composite — fits a profile of a Yale student. (view, courtesy of the Indiana University Bloomington)

- "Everybody Two-Step" (1911); OCLC 793326485, 9968568

By Wallie Herzer
Cover: caricature of a jolly minstrel or busker banjoist with one or two missing teeth, seated in morning dress: single-breasted black frock coat with notched red-trimmed lapels, red, white, and black-striped top collar, red-trimmed sleeves, lined with single white French-cuffs; white vest; black-and-white checkered bow-tie with matching black-and-white checkered trousers trimmed with white gaiters; gemstone centered on upper shirt- or vest-front below the bow tie; black cap-toe dress shoes with white-stitched welts, topped with red, white, and black striped spats that match the top collar; top hat with red patterned hat band on ground, brim up, casting a shadow; red background, black lettering, white base — signature by Morgan indicates 1910 (view, courtesy of York University, Toronto) (2nd view, courtesy of Mississippi State University)

Frederick V. Bowers Music Publishers, Inc., New York

- "Kuu Loke Ula Ula, (My Red Red Rose)" (1917); OCLC 466172206, 498480629

Composed by Frederick V. Bowers (1874–1961), lyrics by Jesse G. M. Glick (né Jesse Grant Monroe Glick; 1874–1939), (view, courtesy of Gonzaga University)

Buell Music, San Francisco

- "She Sang Aloha to Me" (1915); OCLC 26008160

Lyrics & music by Joseph Buell Carey (view, courtesy of Mississippi State University)

- "Sierra Sue", a song of the hills (1916); OCLC 801718663

Words & music by Joseph Buell Carey (view, courtesy of Gonzaga University)

- "Bonnie Bell", three step (1916); OCLC 772288511

Words & music by Joseph Buell Carey (view, courtesy of Gonzaga University)

- "Smile a Little Smile For Me" (1917); OCLC 497148706

Words & music by Joseph Buell Carey
Patriotic World War I song

- "In My Little Lovemobile" (1917); OCLC 26004251

Lyrics & music by Joseph Buell Carey (view, courtesy of The Authentic History Center, Michael Barnes, Ada, Michigan) (2nd view, courtesy of Mississippi State University)

- "Sweet Is the Night, My Lady", Hawaiian serenade (1917); OCLC 775376739, 497148715

Lyrics & music by Joseph Buell Carey (view, courtesy of www.hulapages.com, Keith Emmons, Brea, California)

- "Antonio, My Boy" (1918); OCLC 192135975

Words & music by Joseph Beull Carey (view, courtesy of the Indiana University Bloomington)

McKiernan Publishing, San Jose, California

- "Good-Bye Good Luck Old Hawaii" (1916); OCLC 20332143

Lyrics & music by Joseph M. McKiernan, Jr. (view, courtesy of www.hulapages.com, Keith Emmons, Brea, California)

Sherman, Clay & Co., San Francisco

- "Fair Hawaii" (1913); OCLC 708090878

Lyrics & music James Fulton Kutz (view, courtesy of the Hawaiian Historical Society, Honolulu)

- "My Waikiki Ukulele Girl" (1916); OCLC 20331816

Lyrics Jesse G. M. Glick (né Jesse Grant Monroe Glick; 1874–1939), music by Chris Smith

M. Witmark & Sons, New York

- "My Honolulu Honey Lou" (1911); OCLC 688486797

Lyrics by Will M. Hough (1882–1962) & Frank R. Adams, music by Harold Orlob (view, courtesy of www.hulapages.com, Keith Emmons, Brea, California)

Harry L. Newman, Grand Opera House, Chicago

- "I Want To Meet That Man" ("Who Wrote That Melody") (1913)

Lyrics & music by Will Morrissey & Bert Hanlon (né Adolph Bert Handelsman; 1890–1972) (view, courtesy of Mississippi State University)

Lorden Music, San Francisco

- "The Island of Cuddle and Squeeze" (1914); OCLC 60585333

Lyrics by Maurice J. Gunsky (1887–1945), music by Nathan Goldstein (1887–1956) (view, courtesy of www.hulapages.com, Keith Emmons, Brea, California)

Nat. Goldstein Music Pub. Co., San Francisco

- "A Little Farther" (1914); OCLC 643088548

Lyrics by Maurice J. Gunsky (1887–1945), music by Nathan Goldstein (1887–1956)
Cover: illustration of a man and woman in a car under the full moon (view, courtesy of Mississippi State University)

Art Hickman, San Francisco

- "Rose Room Fox Trot", song without words (1917); OCLC 26004948

By Art Hickman (né Arthur George Hickman; 1886–1930) (Art was a pianist from San Francisco)

Daniels & Wilson, music publishers, San Francisco

- "Dreamy Moon" (1917); OCLC 27308287

Lyrics by Sidney Carter, music by Walter Smith (1885–1968)

- "Bad Bad Baby" (1917)

Lyrics by Raymond Egan, music by Howard Patrick (view, courtesy of Mississippi State University)

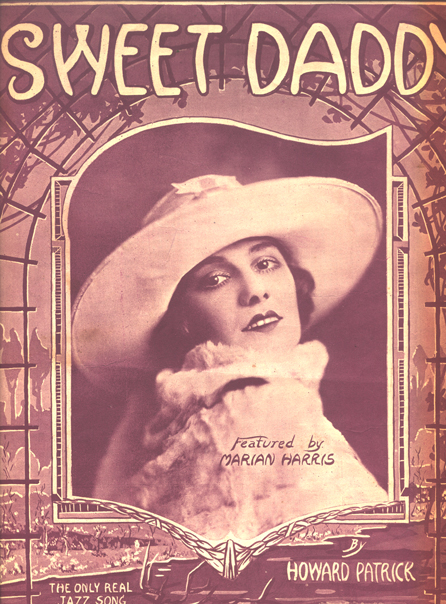
Cover: Marian Harris (née Mary Ellen Harrison; 1897–1944) Background illustration by Morgan

- "Sweet Daddy" (1917); OCLC 51103631, 861077239

Lyrics & music by Howard Patrick

- "Down in Hindustan": song of the East (1917); OCLC 857960723

Lyrics by Raymond B. Egan, music by Walter Smith (1885–1968) (view, courtesy of the Indiana University Bloomington)

- "Oriental" ("Some Day in Araby"), fox trot (1918); OCLC 26005914

Lyrics by Richard Coburn (né Frank Reginald DeLong; 1886–1952), music by Vincent Rose (view, courtesy of www.imagesmusicales.be)

- "My Sweet Virginia Rose" (1918); OCLC 39813171

Lyrics & music by Walter Smith (1885–1968)

F.G. Rempe, Oakland, California

- "Lovely Hawaiian Moon" (1917); OCLC 44129328

Lyrics & music by Frank George Rempe (1891–1959)

J.G. Dewey, San Francisco

- "Over The Top, The Top, We Go" (1918); OCLC 78314279

By James G. Dewey (né James Godfrey Patrick Dewey; 1878–1964) (view, courtesy of Brown University)

J.A. MacMeekin, New York

- "Hawaiian Breezes" (1920); OCLC 20266773

Lyrics by Cyril John MacMeekin (1896–1991), music by John Alfred MacMeeken (1874–1960) – John was Cyril's father (view, courtesy of the Hawaiian Historical Society)

== Family ==
Spouse

Morgan married Ruth Vivian Holloway and had two children, Alan Edgar Morgan, (April 1, 1922 to December 26, 2015), an architect based in the San Francisco Bay area, and Merele Marcella Morgan (1919–2004) who married John Benton Saunders (1917–2010).
