= Abigail Hall =

Cocktail bar in Portland, Oregon, U.S.

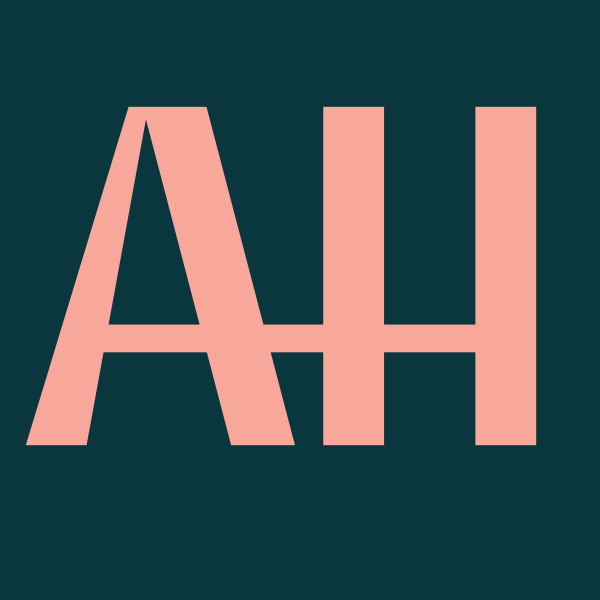

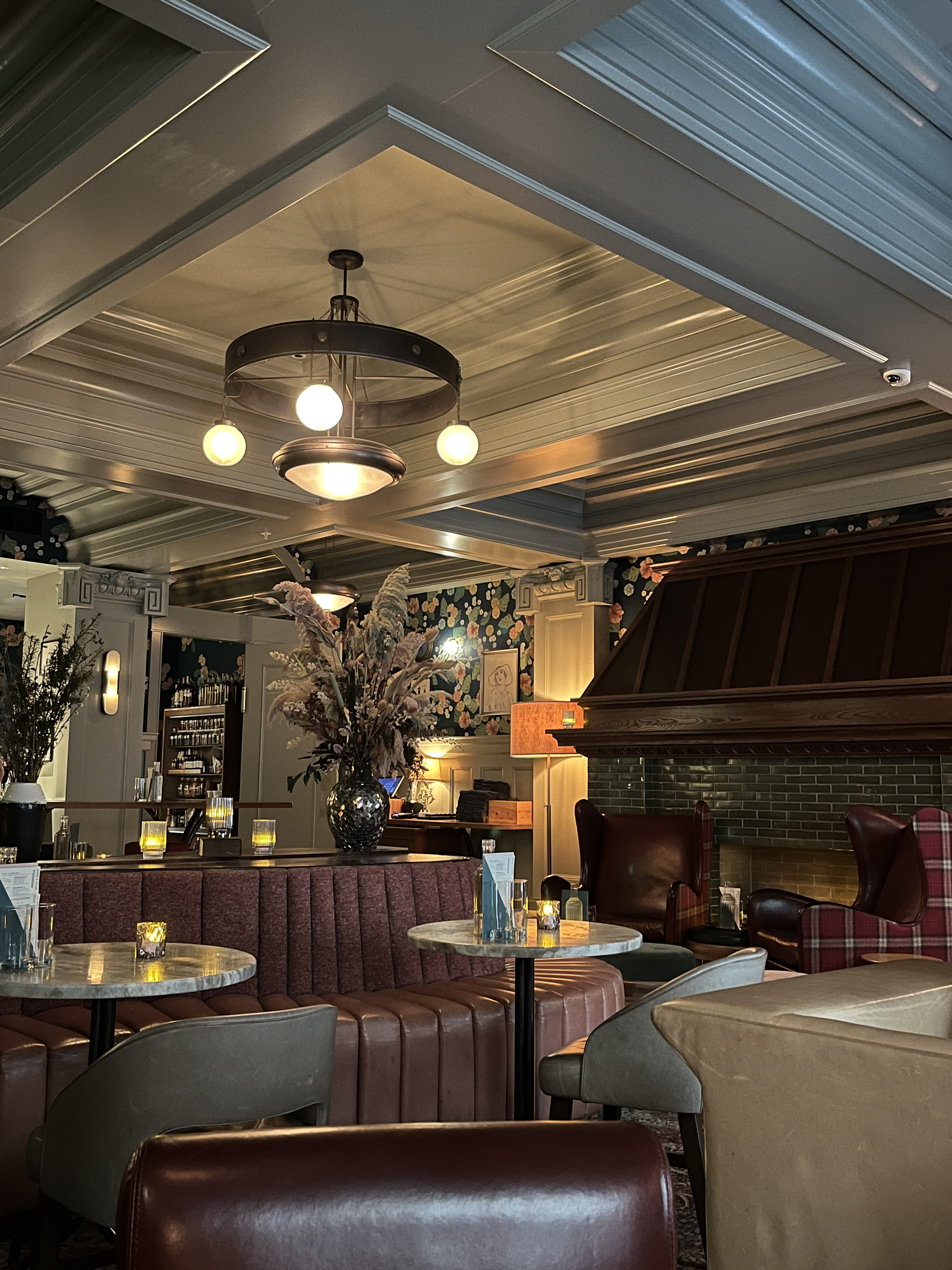
- The bar's interior, 2026
- Interactive map of Abigail Hall

Restaurant information
- Location: 813 Southwest Alder Street, Portland, Multnomah, Oregon, 97205, United States
- Coordinates: 45.5205°N 122.6805°W
- Website: abigailhallpdx.com

Abigail Hall is a cocktail bar in Portland, Oregon, United States.

== Description ==
Abigail Hall is a cocktail bar in downtown Portland's Woodlark Hotel, named after Abigail Scott Duniway. Brooke Jackson-Glidden of Eater Portland said the bar "pairs its floral walls and pink accents with distinguished-looking armchairs and leather booths, covering its counters and mantle with candles. Even with a somewhat-vintage look, Abigail Hall is usually buzzing, with its guests pouring refills of martinis between handfuls of fries." The bar hosts high tea. According to Benjamin Tepler of Portland Monthly, the 35-seat bar's "nine-item menu feels more like the 1950s than the early 1900s, with farm vegetable crudité dipped in green goddess ranch, shrimp cocktails with fresh horseradish, and Waldorf salad with walnuts, apples, blue cheese, and chicories. Yes, there is fried chicken ... in chicken finger form with jalapeno ranch and hot honey mustard."

== History ==
Jennifer Quist, Daniel Osborne, and Doug Adams opened the bar in late 2018.

== Reception ==
Jordan Michelman of Eater Portland included Abigail Hall in a 2021 list of "9 Portland Hotel Bars Ideal for a Mid-Week Drink". The website's 2021 overview of "Where to Eat and Drink in Downtown Portland" says, "Abigail Hall feels like a cosmopolitan lounge, the kind of place where you'd go for high tea or shrimp cocktails (hint: Abigail offers both). At the pink swirling booths that curl through the bar, customers order martinis for the table alongside oysters on the half-shell, before a Manhattan and a burger (or maybe just a pile of chicken strips and fries)". Katrina Yentch of Portland Monthly included the bar in a 2022 list of "The Six Best Portland Spots for Booze Free Drinks".
