= Cornelius Hotel =

Historic building in Portland, Oregon, U.S.

- U.S. National Register of Historic Places
- Portland Historic Landmark
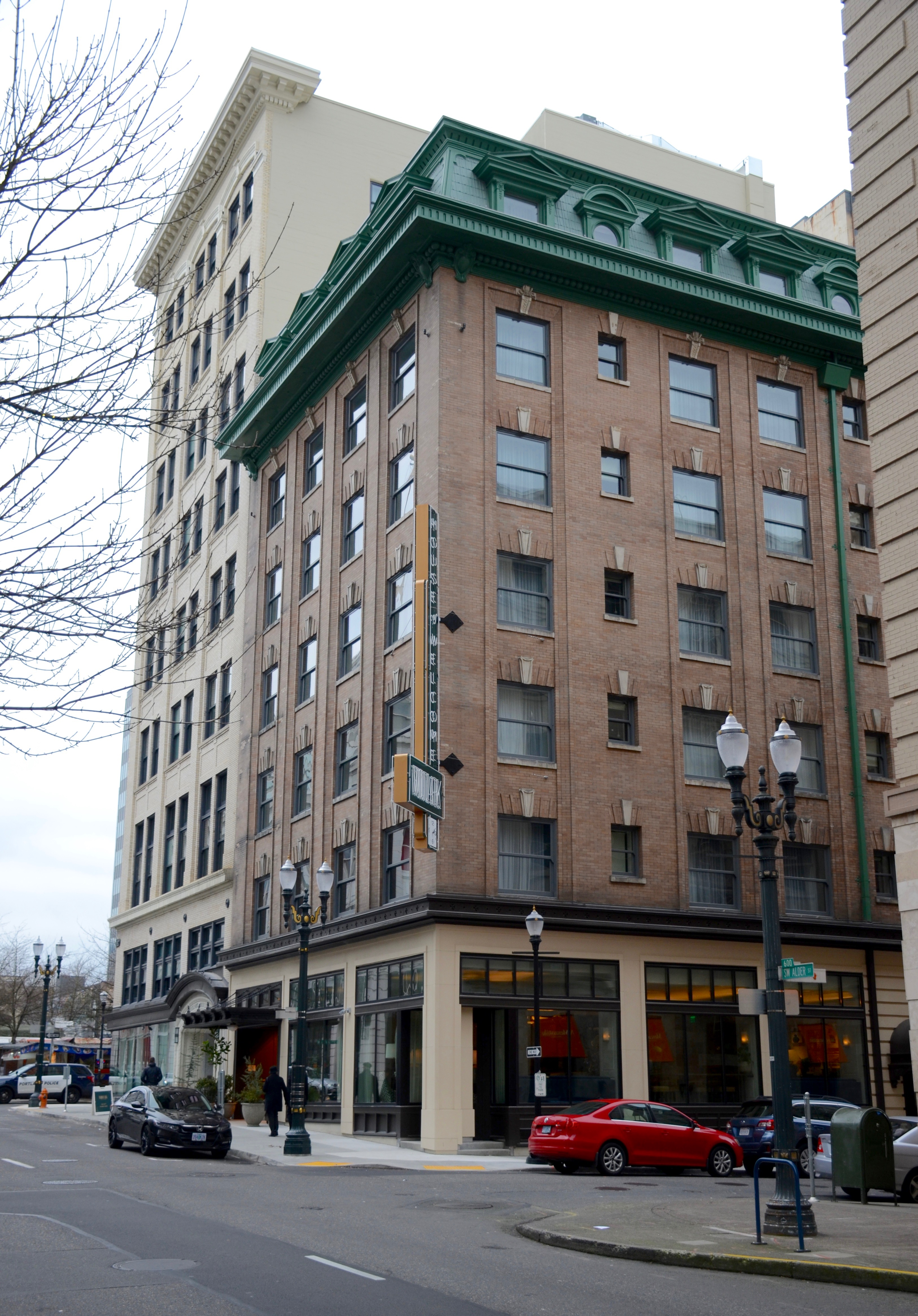
- Woodlark Hotel, December 2018

- Location within Portland, Oregon
- Location: 525 SW Park Ave; Portland, Oregon
- Coordinates: 45°31′14″N 122°40′49″W
- Area: less than one acre
- Built: 1907–08
- Architect: Bennes, Hendricks & Tobey
- Architectural style: Baroque Revival
- NRHP reference No.: 86000286
- Added to NRHP: February 27, 1986

The Cornelius Hotel is a historic hotel building in downtown Portland, Oregon, United States that is listed on the National Register of Historic Places. It was designed by John V. Bennes's firm, and constructed in 1907–08. It ceased to be used as a hotel by the 1950s. A fire in 1985 left the top three floors of the structure uninhabitable. By the early 1990s, the building had been vacated, and it remained vacant for more than two decades. In 2016–2018, it was joined to the adjacent Woodlark Building, extensively renovated, and converted into a hotel. The Woodlark Hotel opened on December 15, 2018.

== Description and history ==
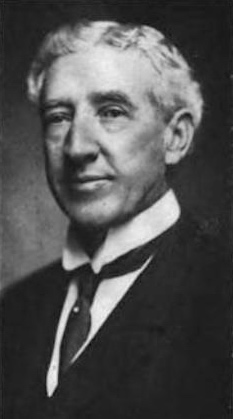
Hotel proprietor Dr. Charles W. Cornelius, c. 1915

The seven-story building is categorized as being 20th-century Baroque Revival architecture, and contains 66 hotel rooms. Until 1920, it was operated by Charles W. Cornelius (1856–1923), a businessman and doctor and Multnomah County's first coroner. He named the hotel for his family and his brother, Colonel Thomas R. Cornelius. The Cornelius brothers' father founded the town of Cornelius west of Portland after emigrating to Oregon on the Oregon Trail with Joseph Meek.

The building has a "dramatic coffered ceiling in the lobby" and a French sheet metal mansard roof with cornice and entablature, and exterior masonry and terra-cotta. It included a ground-floor wood storefront that was once a "Ladies Reception Hall" and an "opulent" basement cafe. "Ornate wood paneling and trim" was included throughout the building.

By at least the 1950s, the hotel had transitioned from being a conventional hotel to an apartment hotel. The Cornelius housed a gay bathhouse in the 1960s and 1970s, while still being used mostly as a residential hotel. It was still serving as the latter in the 1980s, but a fire in 1985 left the top three floors uninhabitable, and only residents of the second, third, and fourth floors were permitted to return to the building after the fire.

By at least 1992, the building's residential use had ceased completely, and it became vacant on all but the ground floor. In 2002, TMT Development, developer Tom Moyer's real estate company, purchased the property for $2.4 million with plans to renovate the building. The renovated business-class hotel was to be reopened by June 2009 with the name "Alder Park Hotel", following a period where it was home to trespassers for many years after the 1980s. The 2008 financial crisis, however, halted work on the project, as well as Moyer's Park Avenue West Tower.

In 2013, TMT applied to the city to tear down the structure, but those plans were canceled when the building was sold again in 2014, to Arthur Mutal LLC.

== Restoration and reconversion into hotel ==
The building before and during its 2016–18 renovation

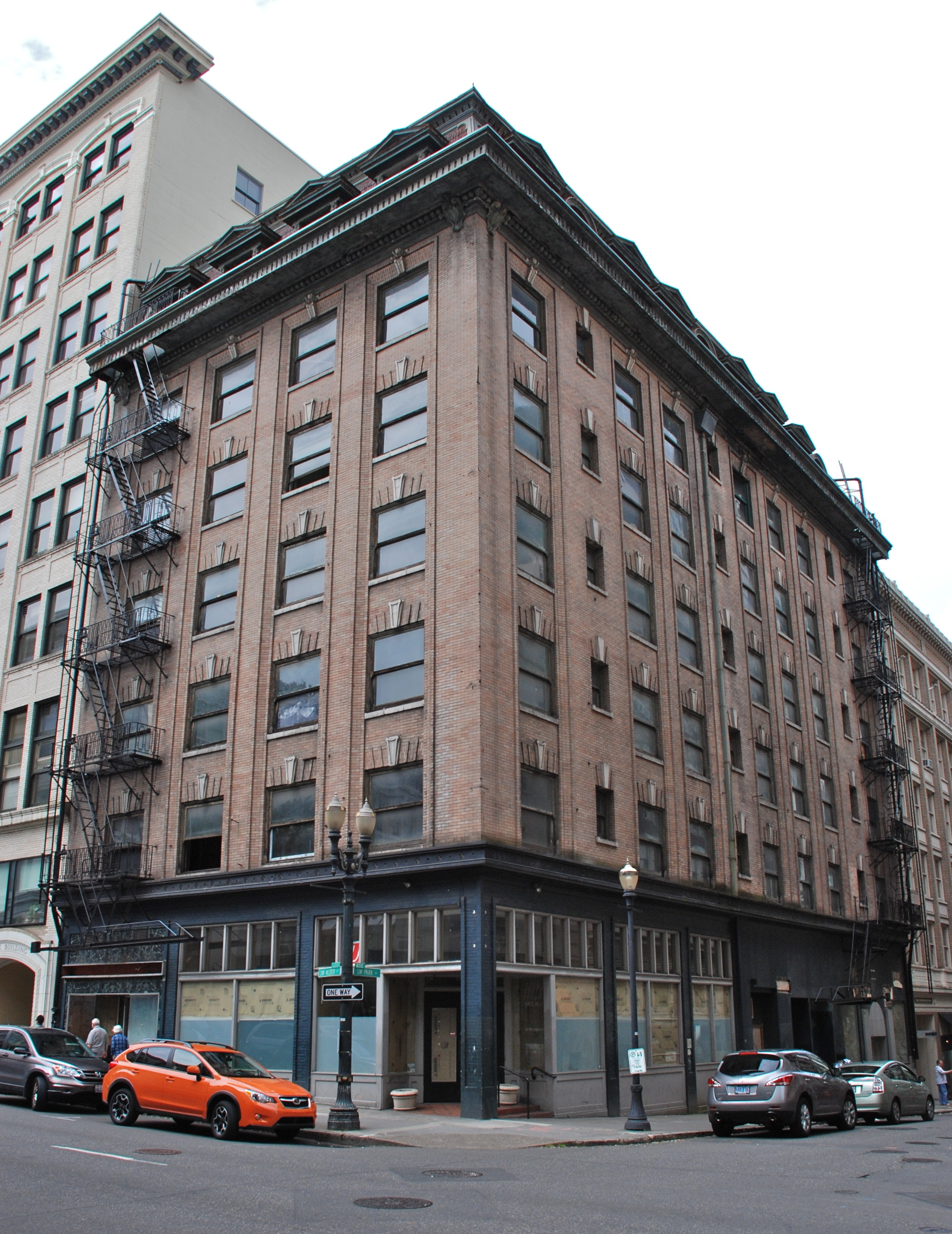
In 2014, before the start of renovation and restoration. The building had been vacant for several years.

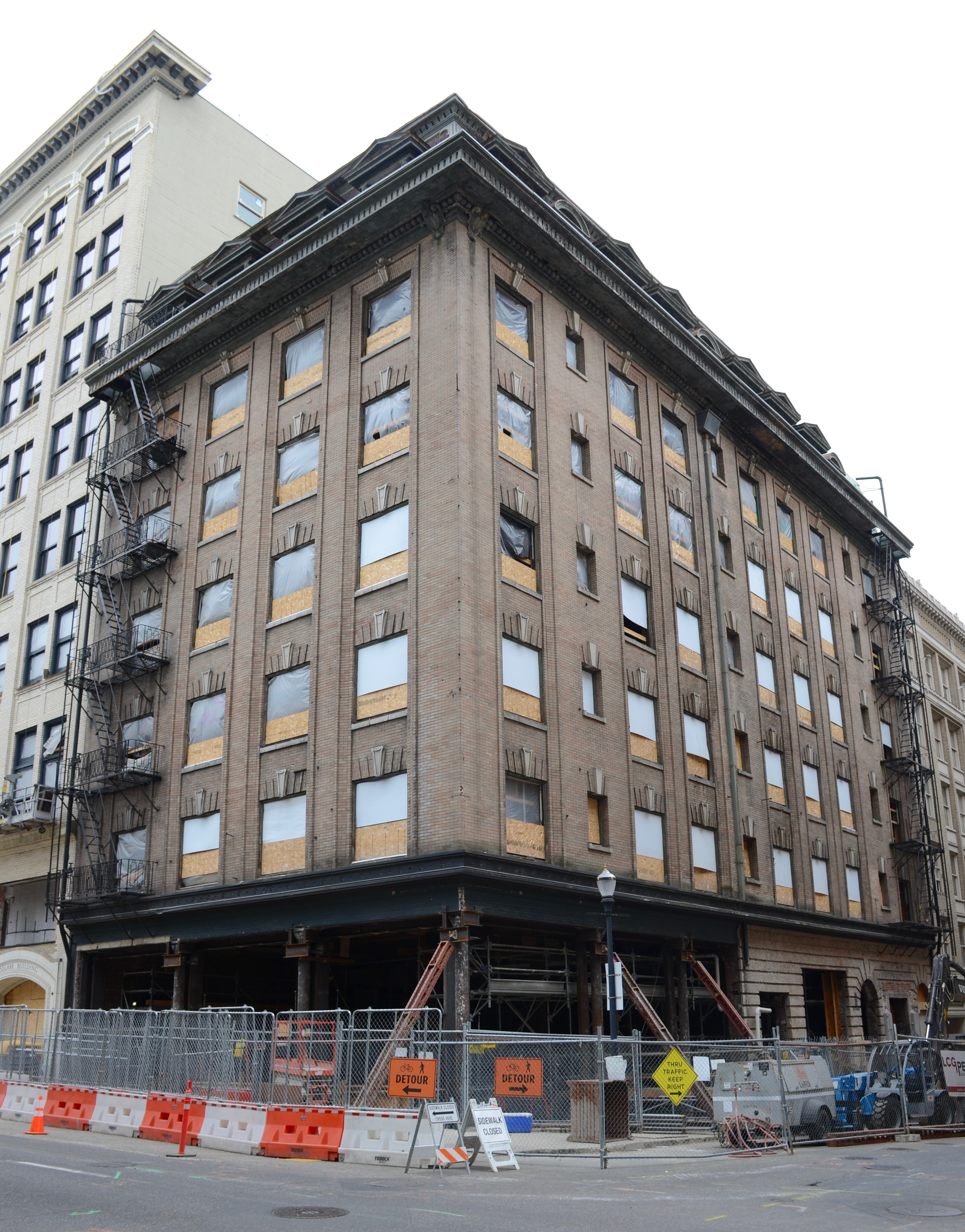
Undergoing extensive renovation in August 2017. The fire escapes were subsequently removed.

In January 2015, it was announced that the building was to be joined to the adjacent Woodlark Building, renovated and returned to use as a hotel. The Woodlark Building, which would be converted from its then-existing use as an office building, is also listed on the National Register of Historic Places. As of 2016, the planned renovation and conversion was expected to cost $30 million, funded by NBP Capital, Provenance Hotels and Arthur Mutal. The hotel created from the combined buildings was to be named The Woodlark and was slated to have 151 rooms and two restaurants or bars. Construction began in September 2016, and the new hotel opened on December 15, 2018.

== See also ==
- National Register of Historic Places listings in Southwest Portland, Oregon
