= Sherman Clay =

American Music Instruments Retailer

Sherman, Clay & Co.
- Company type: Private
- Industry: Musical instruments
- Founded: 1853
- Defunct: 2013
- Headquarters: San Bruno, California, U.S.
- Number of locations: around 60 (1980s)
- Area served: North America
- Products: pianos, sheet music
- Parent: Sherman Clay Group

Sherman, Clay & Co. was an American musical instruments retailer—mainly pianos—and a publisher and seller of sheet music, founded in San Francisco. Founded in 1853 as A. A. Rosenberg, it was sold to Leander Sherman and Clement Clay in 1870 and was incorporated as Sherman, Clay & Company in 1892. During the 20th century, it gradually expanded its retail operation into a nationwide chain of stores, and by the 1980s it had around 60 stores. It was based in San Francisco until at least the 1970s. In 2013, the company closed or sold its last retail stores.

== History ==
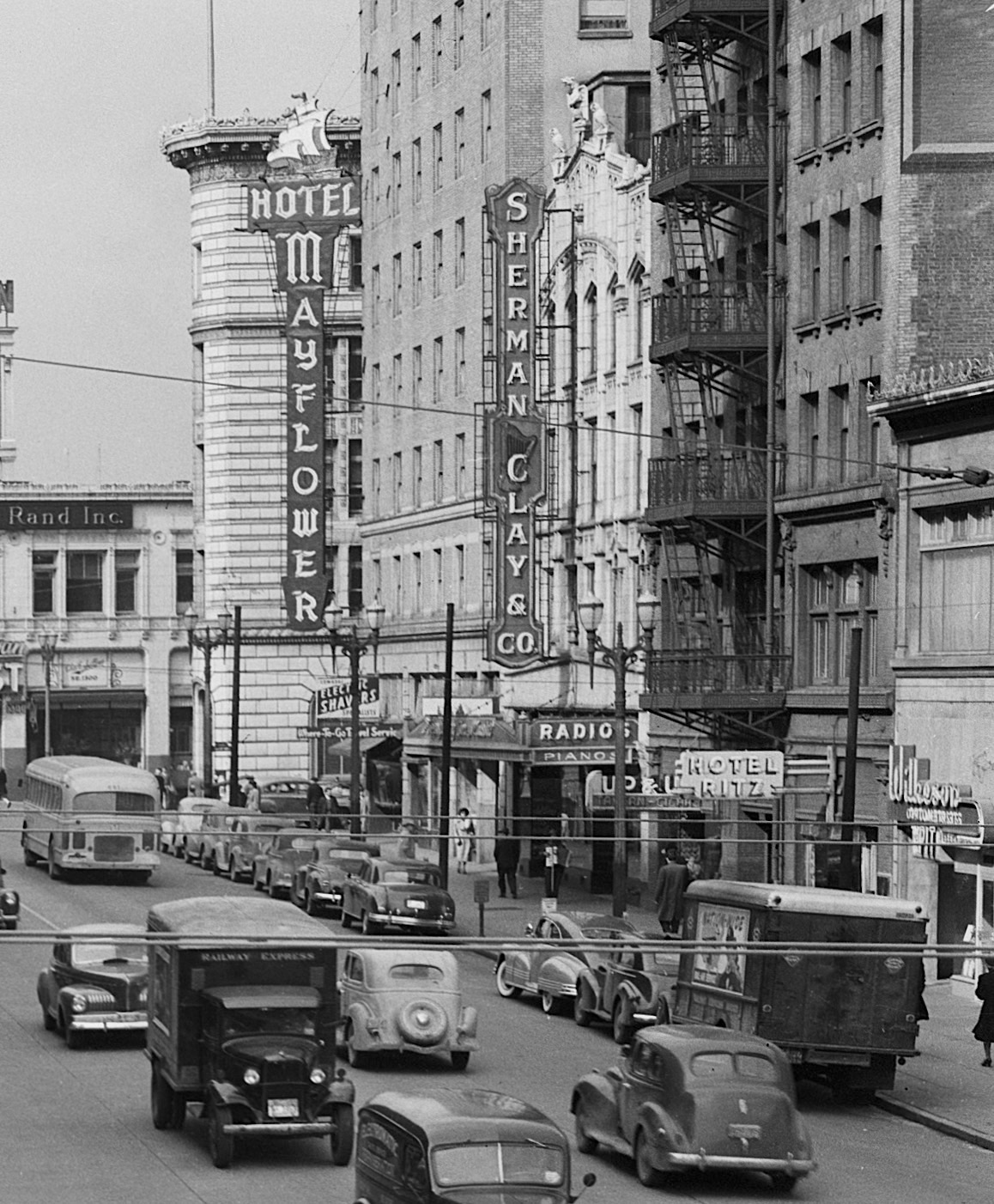
The Sherman, Clay & Company store in downtown Seattle in 1951

What would become Sherman, Clay was founded in 1853 as the A. A. Rosenberg music store and was located in San Francisco at the corner of Kearny and Sutter Streets. Leander Schutzenbach Sherman (1847–1926), who had been working as a clerk for Rosenberg, bought out his employer in 1870 and took on Major Clement C. Clay (1836–1905) as a partner in 1879. In 1892, Sherman, Clay & Co. was incorporated with Sherman as president. During the 1890s, the firm imported music, pianos, and musical instruments; and it manufactured pianos and church organs from its factory. At that time, the two principals were Leonard Georges (born 1850), who served as treasurer, and Louis F. Geissler (born 1861).

By 1894, the company had grown to four stores, with the opening of a store in Portland, Oregon, joining existing ones in San Francisco, Oakland, and Seattle. The Portland store changed locations a few times but, notably, remained in the Woodlark Building from 1930 to 1974, and the company continued to operate a Portland store until 2013. Clay Sherman, grandson of co-founder Leander Sherman, became president of the company in 1949. The company was sold to Bernard Schwartz, of San Francisco, in 1957.

The company had 21 stores in the 1950s, and was continuing to expand. It had 28 stores in spring of 1965, all located in the three states of California, Oregon and Washington. Its headquarters was still in San Francisco at that time. The company soon began to expand beyond the West Coast, and by the mid-1970s it had "become a national chain, with stores from Manhattan to Kansas City and Seattle to Los Angeles." In the 1980s, it had around 60 stores.

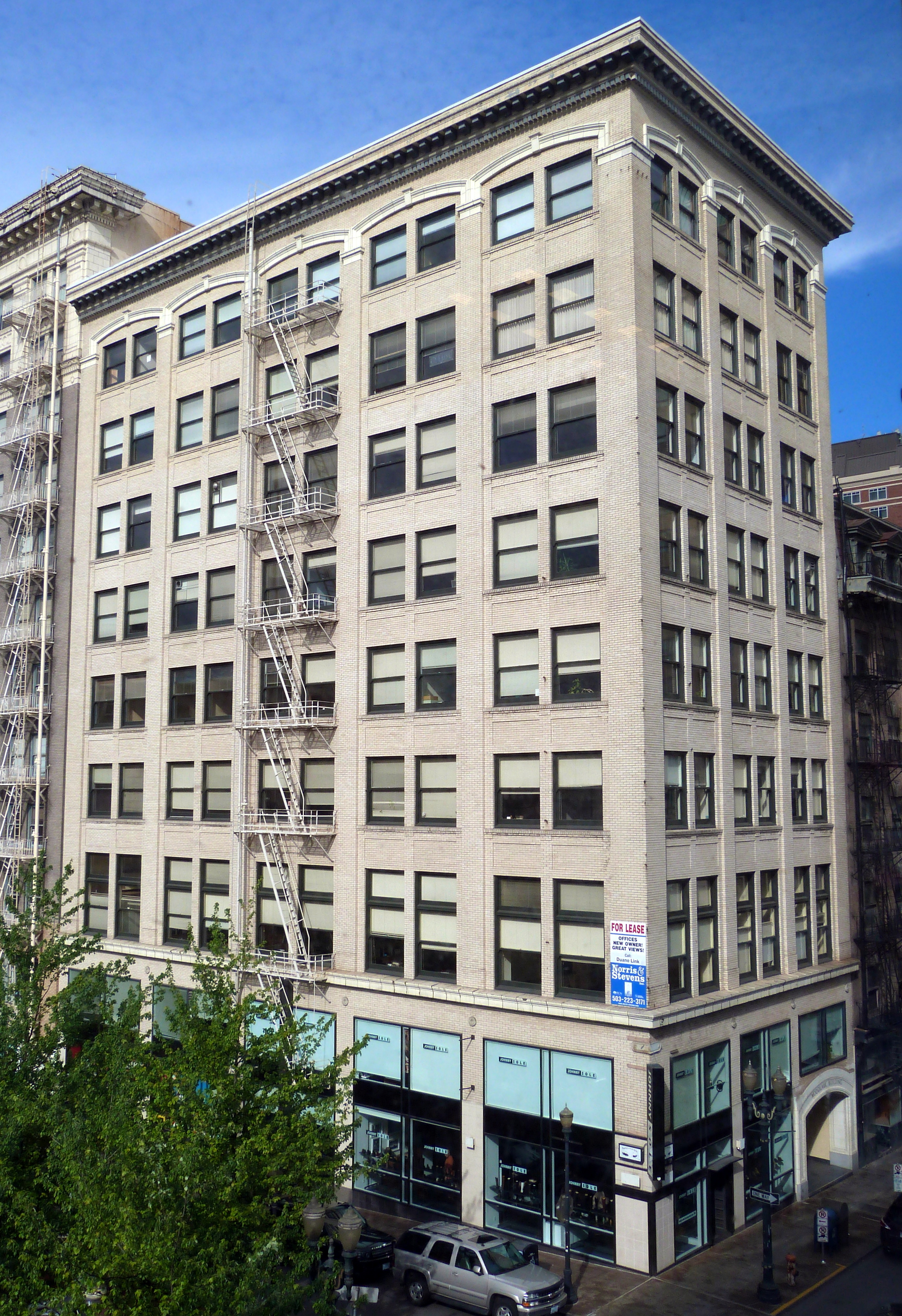
The Woodlark Building, in Portland, Oregon, had a Sherman Clay store from 1930 to 1974.

=== 21st century ===
By the 2010s, Sherman, Clay claimed to have sold over two million instruments. The company also sold new and used pianos manufactured by companies such as Steinway & Sons (which included subcontracted pianos from suppliers sold under the secondary names Boston and Essex), the Yamaha Corporation, and the Henry F. Miller Piano Company.

In 2013, Sherman Clay announced it was exiting the retail business in California, its longtime home base, on May 31, 2013, after 142 years. Of the four remaining California locations at that time, the stores in San Francisco and Walnut Creek were sold to Steinway and Sons, to remain in operation as piano dealerships, while those in Roseville and San Bruno were to be closed. The company had only two stores elsewhere at the time, in Seattle and Houston, but they closed later the same year, the Houston store around June and the Seattle store in September 2013. The Seattle location was the company's last store. Since the 1970s, the company had been owned by Sherman Clay Group, a diverse company involved in real estate management and consumer finance.

May 7, 2013, was proclaimed by San Francisco chief of Protocol Charlotte Mailliard Shultz as Sherman Clay Day in San Francisco to honor the retailer.

== Selected personnel ==
General manager

- Al Jacobs (1903–1985), songwriter
- C.M. "Sandy" Balcom, and Leroy "Pop" Vaughan, who both once worked for the Sherman, Clay & Co., in Seattle, went on to found Balcom and Vaughan, a pipe organ manufacturing company in Seattle
- Richard Powers, Sherman, Clay's general manager for the New York office, until 1925, when he went into radio
- Bernie Pollack replaced Richard Powers in 1925 as general manager of the New York office

Sheet music

- Elizabeth Octavia Garrett (née Stone), mother of actress Betty Garrett (1919–2011) managed the sheet music department in Sherman Clay, Seattle

Professional staff

- Rose Fischer (born around 1878), in 1922, left a position in the New York office of Broadway Music to work with the professional department in the New York office of Sherman, Clay & Co. She was hired by Richard Powers, Sherman, Clay's general manager for the New York office; She married William C. Spiegel (born around 1875) in 1998 in San Francisco

== Selected published music, composers, and lyricists ==
Works

- "Li'l Liza Jane" (1916)
- "Rose Room" (1917)
- "Whispering" (1920)
- "My Little Grass Shack in Kealakekua, Hawaii" (1933)
- "Close Your Eyes" (1933)

Composers and lyricists

- Wallie Herzer (1885–1961), composer, lyricist
- Harry D. Kerr (1880–1957), composer, lyricist
- Vincent Rose (1880–1944), composer
- Nacio Herb Brown (1896–1964), composer
- Johnny Noble (1892–1944), composer
- Bernice Petkere (1901–2000), composer, lyricist

== Selected sheet music artists and engravers ==
- Leland Stanford Morgan (1886–1981)

== Images ==
Selected sheet music cover artists

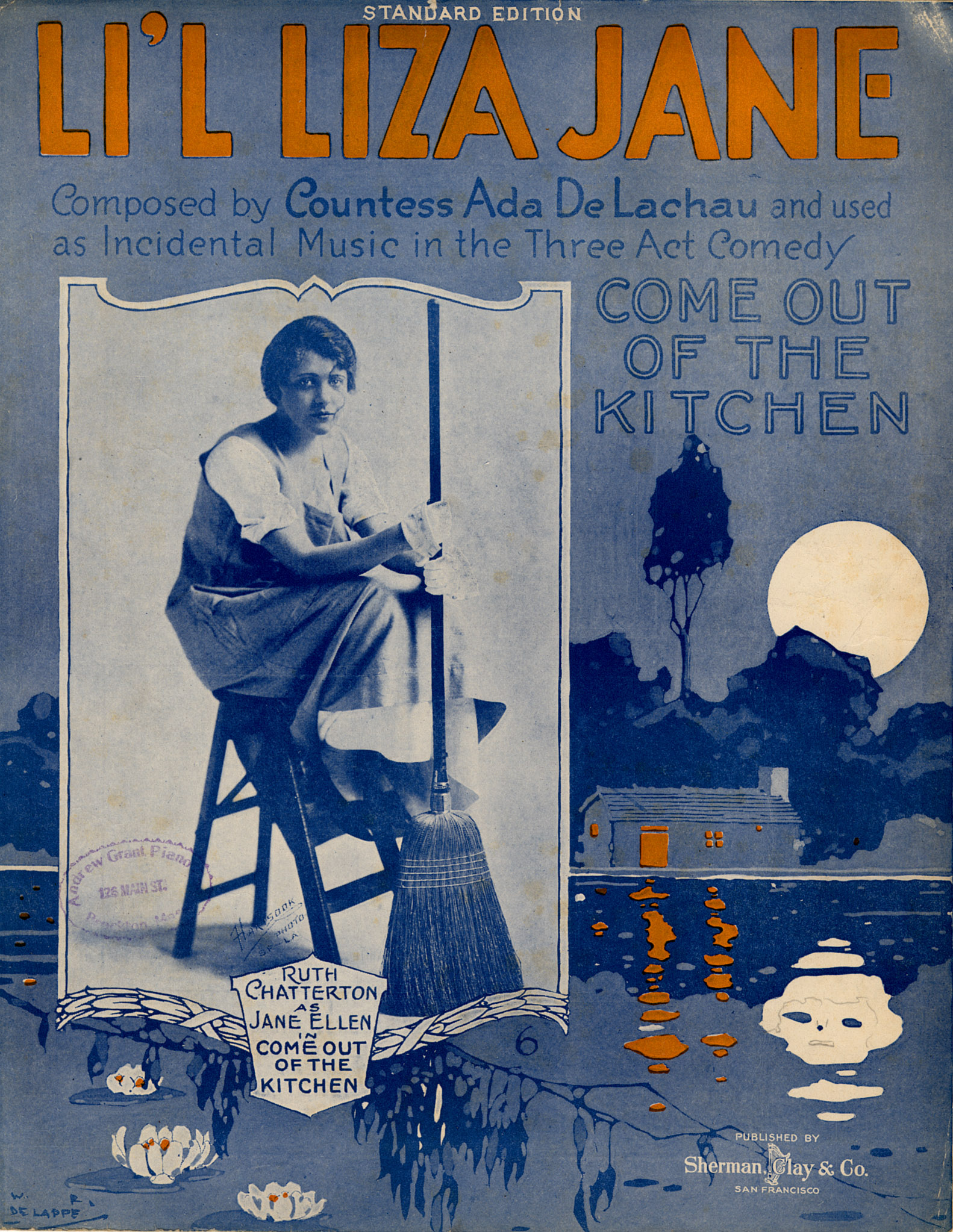
Wesley Raymond
De Lappe
(1887–1952)

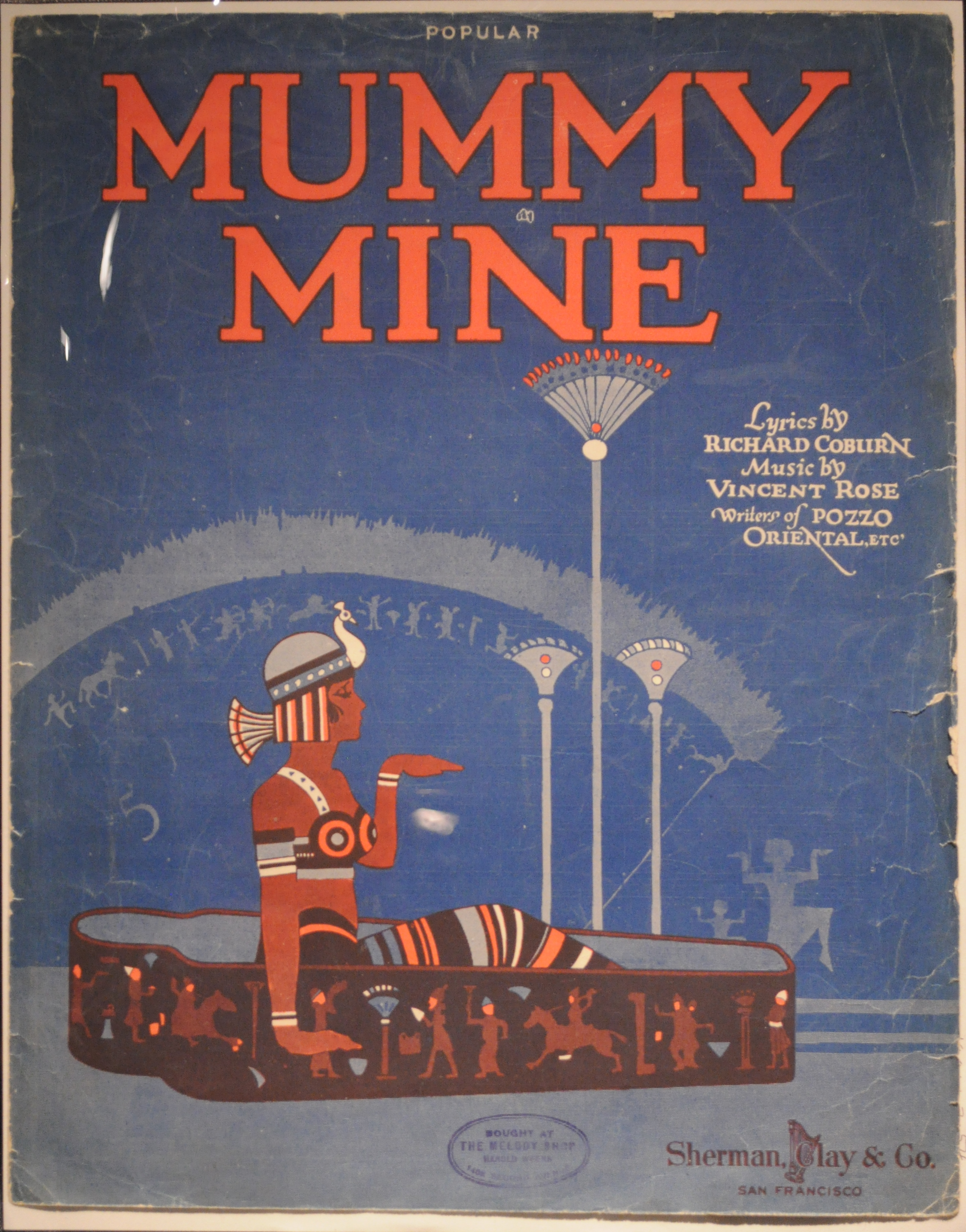
Cover artist: Unknown

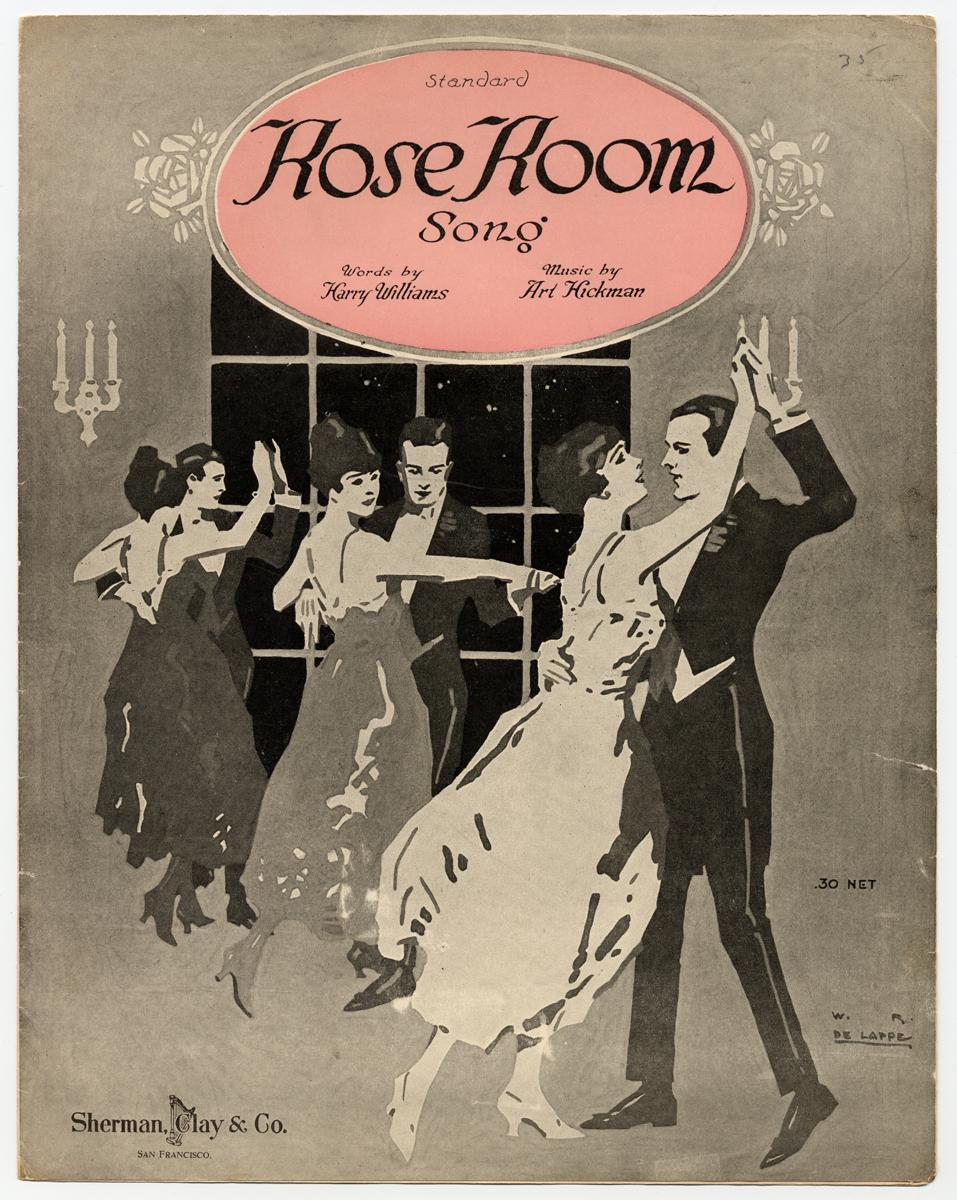
Wesley Raymond
De Lappe
(1887–1952)

Wesley Raymond
De Lappe
(1887–1952)

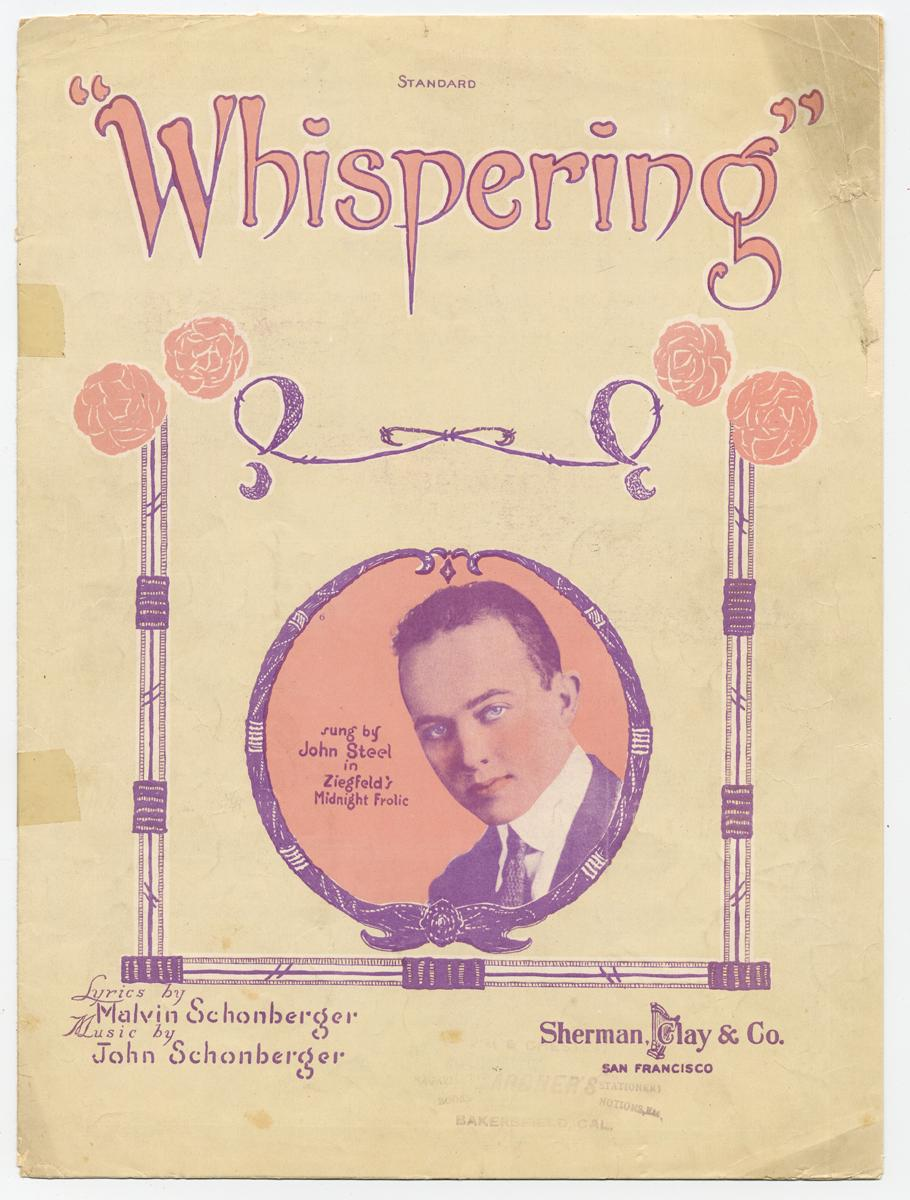
Cover artist: Unknown

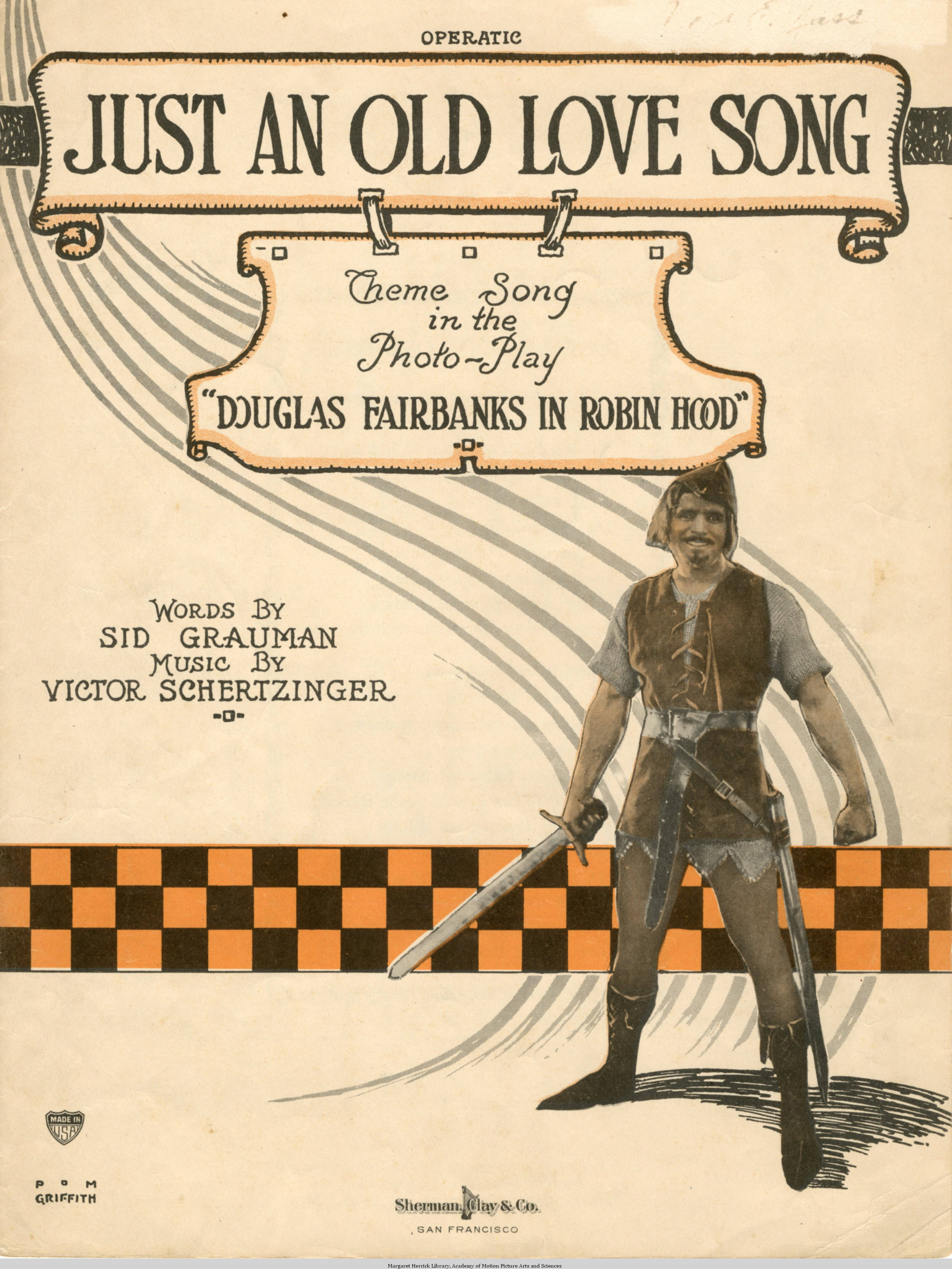
Porter Murdock Griffith
(1889–1969)
Main store in Oakland, California (1947)
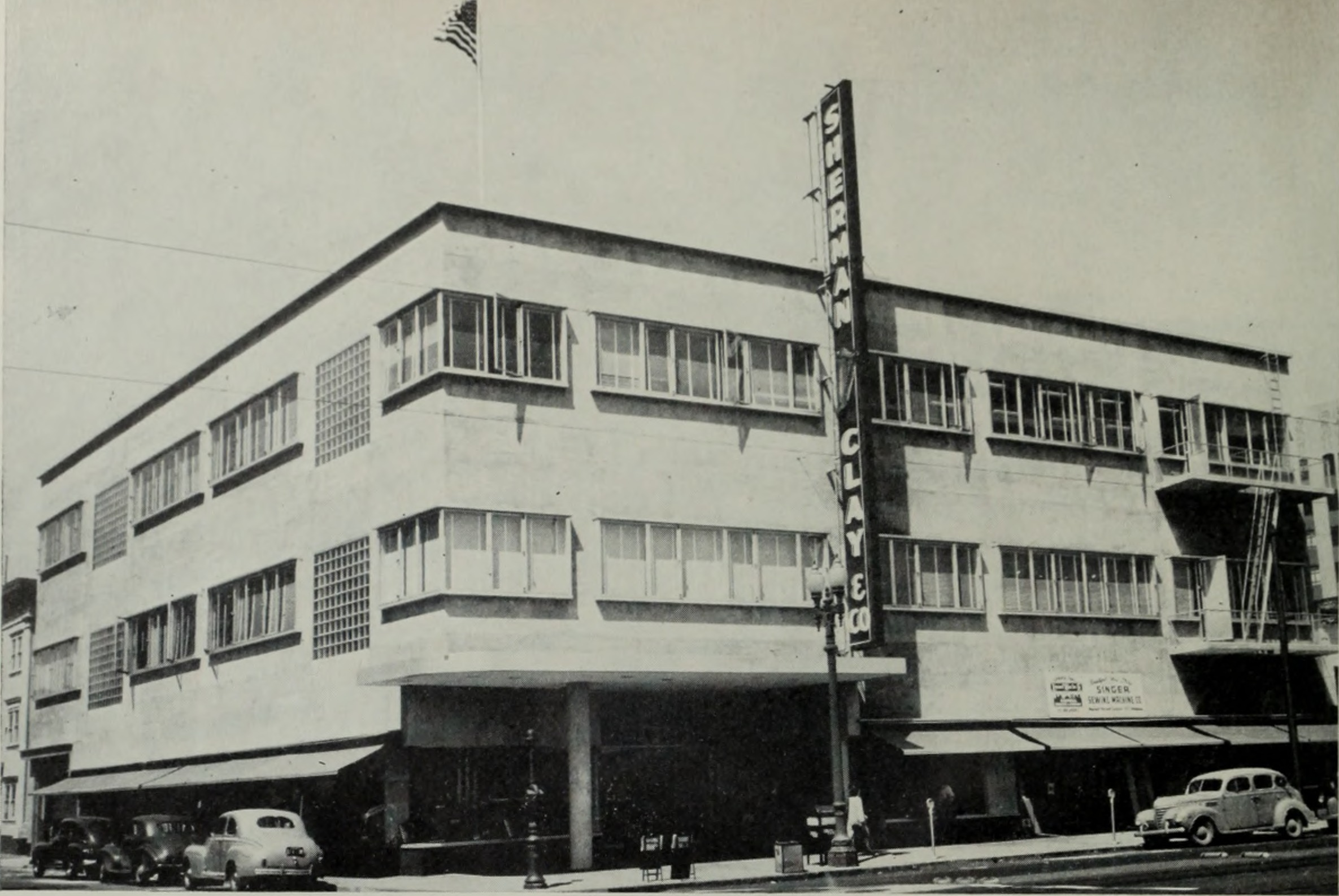
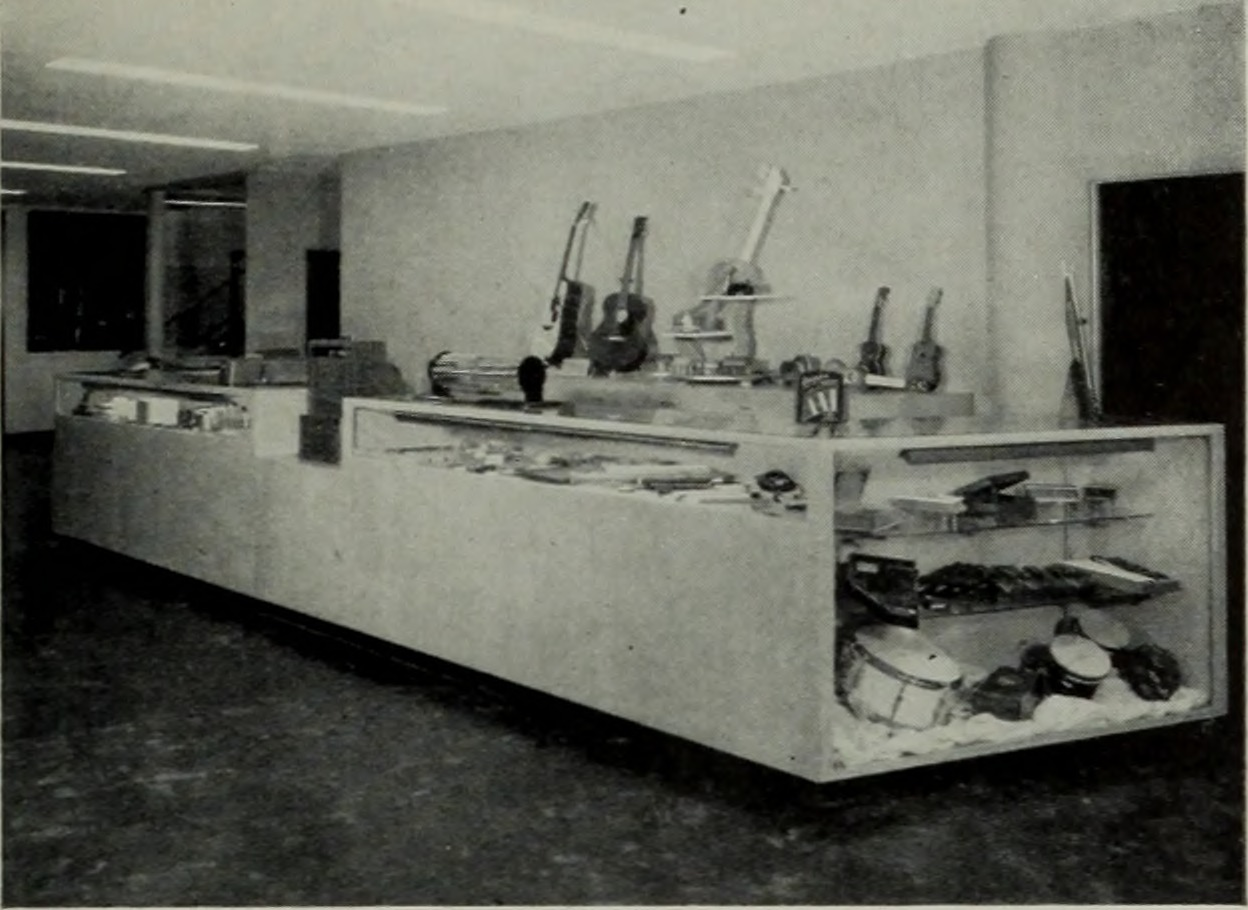
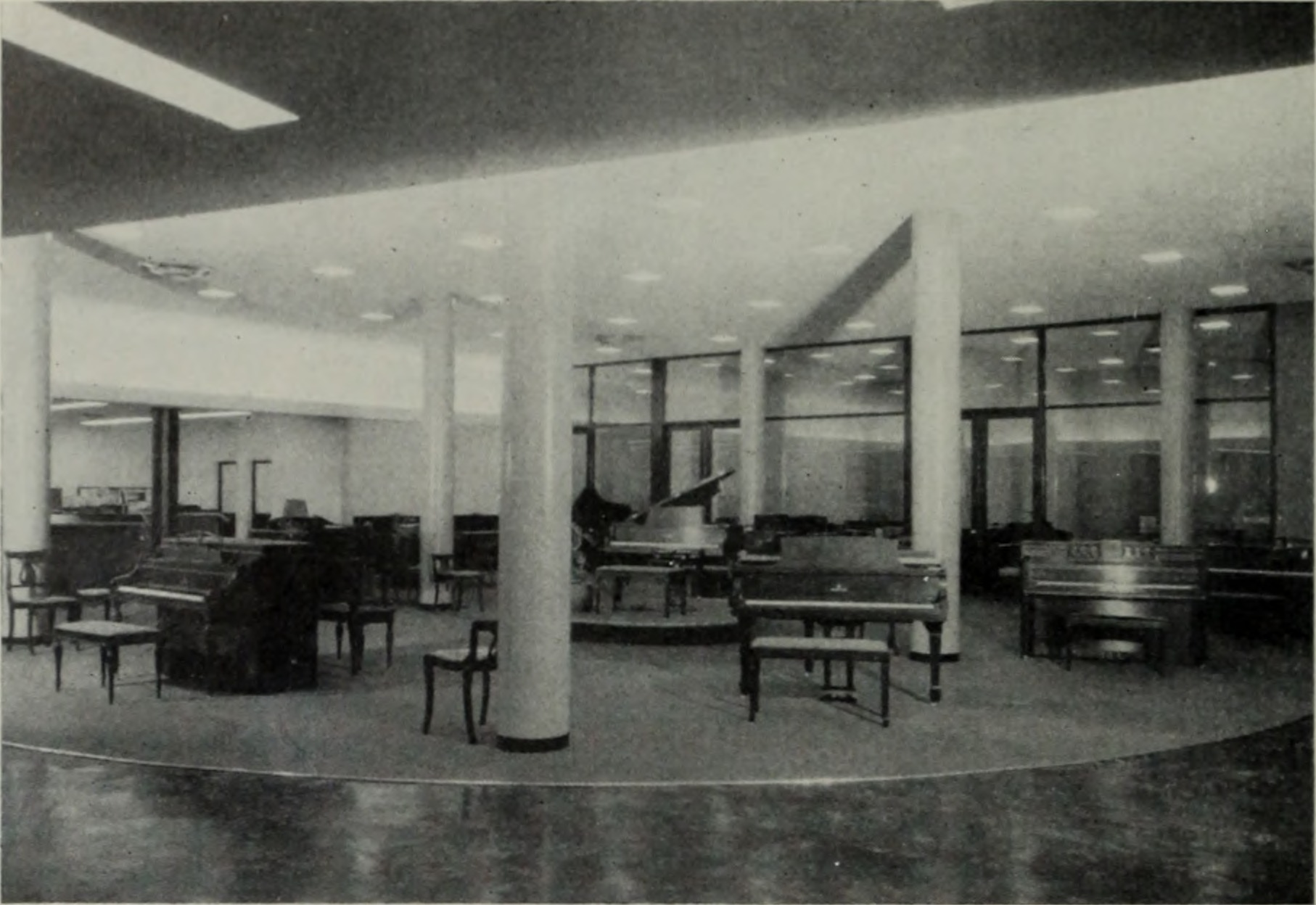
Built in 1947, Oakland, California, William Wurster, architect
