= Mike Bernard (musician) =

American musician (1875–1936)

- Mike Bernard
- Born: Michael Barnet Brown; March 17, 1875; New York City, New York, U.S.
- Died: June 27, 1936 (aged 61); New York City, New York, U.S.
- Occupation: Pianist
- Years active: 1895–1936
- Spouse(s): May Agnes Convery (1898–1911) Florence "Flo" Courtney (1914–1916) Katherine "Kitty" Stapleton (1919–1936)

Mike Bernard (né Michael Barnet Brown; March 17, 1875 – June 27, 1936) was an American musician who influenced the development of ragtime-era music.

== Career ==
A musical child prodigy born in New York City's Manhattan, Michael Barnet Brown was the son of decorator and wallpaper dealer Julius S. Brown and his wife Eva Eisenberg. He had one older brother, Harry, born in 1873. (Note: Information collected from 1892 New York state census, Manhattan city directories from the 1870s through 1890s, and two different marriage certificates for Michael Bernard as Michael Brown. Refer to ragpiano.com/comps/mbernard.shtml link for a more detailed explanation) Michael studied at the Berlin Conservatory and once reportedly played before the Kaiser. At age twenty-one, back in New York, he heard Ben Harney (the self-proclaimed "inventor of ragtime") perform, and decided to compete against him. He soon became known as one of the best ragtime performers in the country, billing himself as the "Rag Time King of the World." A white musician with little exposure to the African-American roots of ragtime, he pioneered a style of music that appealed to the public but is often derided by purists as "pseudo-ragtime." He was one of the first to record ragtime piano styles, working for Columbia Records starting in 1912.

While he played in vaudeville pretty much continuously from the late 1890s through the late 1910s, his style mostly fell out of favor by the onset of the jazz age. He was considered for a spot with the Original Dixieland Jazz Band in 1918 after pianist Henry Ragas died in the Spanish influenza outbreak, but the job ended up going to J. Russell Robinson. Mike still managed to work in increasingly smaller venues through the 1920s, last performing at Bill's Gay Nineties in Manhattan just weeks before his death.

His style, flashy and fast, influenced the white ragtime composers of Tin Pan Alley but was often looked down upon by the admirers of the "genuine ragtime" that issued from African-American communities. Artists considered part of the "Mike Bernard school" include Pete Wendling, Lee S. Roberts, Max Kortlander, Frank Banta, Victor Arden, Phil Ohman, Zez Confrey, Charley Straight, and Roy Bargy.

== Awards ==
Tony Paster's Theatre (sponsor)

- January 23, 1900: Winner, Ragtime Piano Contest, Tammany Hall
- January 30, 1906: Winner, Ragtime Piano Contest

Judges: Charlie Horwitz, Harry Von Tilzer, Gus Edwards

== Selected discography ==
Mike Bernard (solo piano)

- Columbia A-1266

38467-1 (matrix) — "Everybody two-step", by Wallie Herzer; OCLC 4536144
Reissues (i) Vintage Jazz Mart (Europe) VLP2 & (ii) Smithsonian Folkways RF24
Recorded in New York City December 2, 1912

38466 (matrix) — "Battle of San Juan Hill", composed by Mike Bernard; OCLC 4536129
Recorded in New York City, probably December 2, 1912

- Columbia A-1276; OCLC 405754765

38465-1 (matrix) — "Fantasy on Pilgrims' Chorus from Tannhauser", "Finale to Rubinstein's E Flat Concerto"; OCLC 84340026
Recorded in New York City December 2, 1912

38474-1 (matrix) — "Fantasy On Mendelssohn's Spring Song", "Rubinstein's Melody In F"; OCLC 84487091
Recorded in New York City December 4, 1912

- Columbia A-1313

38472-1 (matrix) — "That Peculiar Rag", by Barney Fagan; OCLC 807049659
Recorded in New York City December 3, 1912

38478 (matrix) — "Medley Of Ted Snyder's Hits"; OCLC 79686914

1. Intro to "My Sweet Italian", by Irving Berlin
2. "When The Midnight Choo-Choo Leaves for Albam' ", by Irving Berlin
3. "Ragtime Soldier Man", by Irving Berlin

Recorded in New York City, December 4, 1912

- Columbia A-1427

Side A: 38829-2 (matrix) — "Maori", A Samoan dance; OCLC 807061655, 82045305
Recorded in New York City, May 8, 1913
Reissues (i) Timeless Records (Netherlands) CBC1-035 (CD)

Side B: 38927-1 (matrix) — "1915 Rag", by Harry Tierney; OCLC 84374803
Recorded in New York City, June 27, 1913
Reissues (i) Smithsonian Folkways RF33 (ii) Timeless Records (Netherlands) CBC1-035 (CD)

- Columbia A-1386

38925 (matrix) — "Medley of Berlin Songs"
Recorded in New York City June 27, 1913

38928-1 (matrix) — "Tantalizing Tingles", by Sol Violinsky and Mike Bernard
Reissues (i) Smithsonian Folkways RF23, Vintage Jazz Mart (Europe) VLP2
Recorded in New York City June 27, 1913

- Columbia A-1590

Side A: 38475 (matrix) — "A Trip Across The Pond — Introducing Old Irish And Scotch Airs"; OCLC 81589694

Side B: 38828 (matrix) — "Tango Bonita", by Maurice Smith; OCLC 81031671

- Columbia A-2577

77780-1 (matrix) — "Blaze Away"; OCLC 77894363
Recorded in New York City April 25, 1918
Reissues (i) Smithsonian Folkways RF23, Timeless Records (Netherlands) CBC1-035

77783 (matrix) — "When Alexander Takes His Ragtime Band To France", "Some One Else May Be There While I'm Gone"; OCLC 77920863

77783-3 (matrix) — "They Were All Out of Step But Jim", by Irving Berlin
Recorded in New York City April 25, 1918

== Personal ==
Married three times, he had three sons, one out of wedlock with Ziegfeld Follies girl Dorothy Zuckerman. He also had an intimate relationship with singer Blossom Seeley around 1908 to 1909. Bernard and his first wife, May Convery — with whom there are two marriage certificates in Manhattan: February 25, 1897, and June 7, 1898 — had a son, Melvin Bernard (musician; born 1899). Bertram M. Bernard (lawyer; 1914–1988) was born to Dorothy Zuckerman, but there is no evidence of any marriage to Michael. Julius "Jules" Brown Bernard was born to his third wife, Katherine "Kitty" Stapleton, on October 9, 1921. One other wife, Florence Courtney of the Courtney Sisters, divorced Mike in 1916 after just over two years of marriage, as he was discovered with another female companion, and they were sharing a single pair of pajamas. (Note: Syndicated article from February 25, 1916, in national newspapers.)
