= Good Coffee =

Coffee company in the U.S. state of Oregon

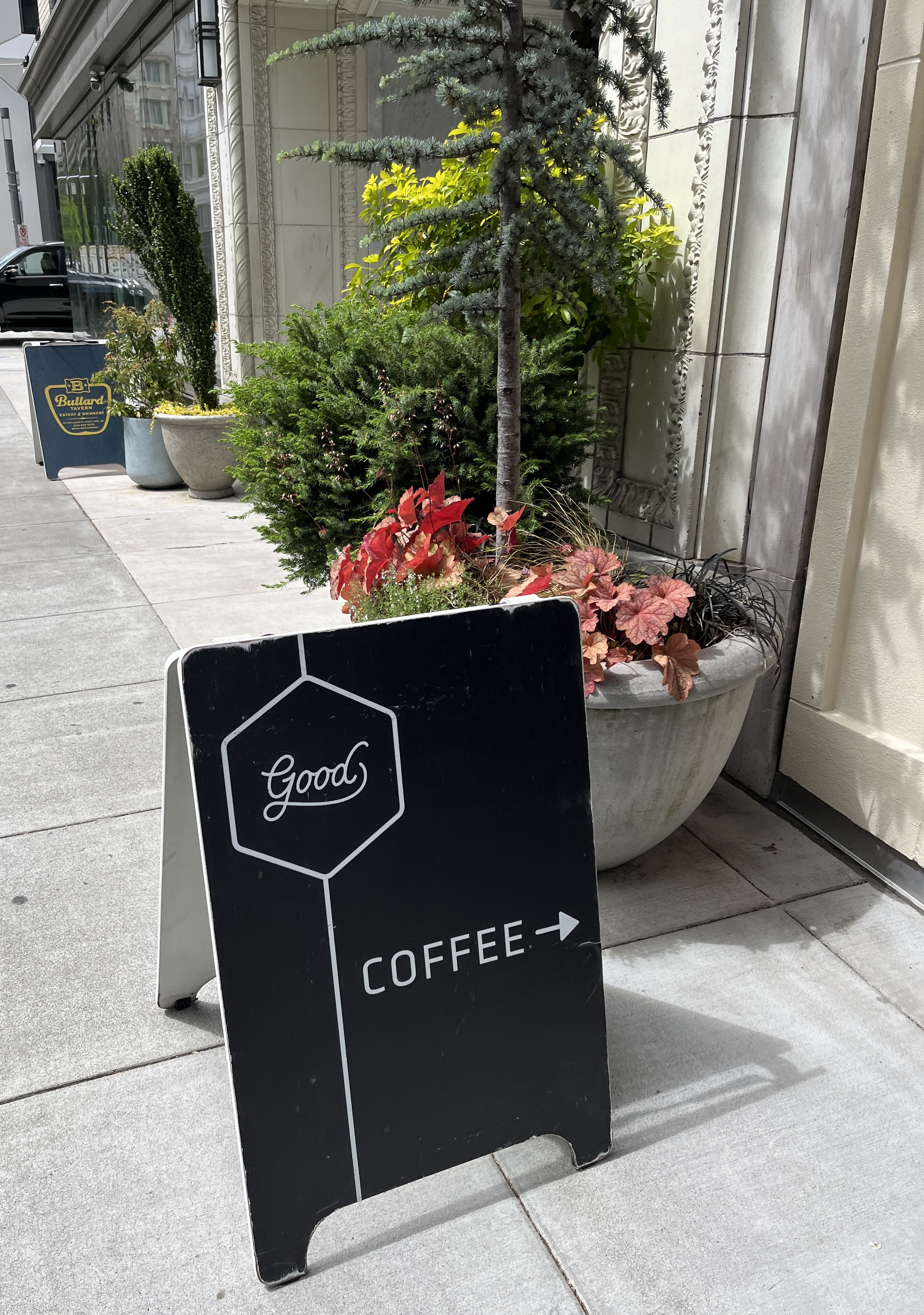
- Sign outside the Good Coffee location at the Woodlark Hotel in Portland, Oregon, in 2024

Restaurant information
- Established: 2014
- Owners: Nick Purvis; Sam Purvis
- Location: Oregon, United States
- Website: goodwith.us

Good Coffee is a coffee business based in Portland, Oregon, United States.

== Description ==
The business operates multiple locations in the Portland metropolitan area, including at Portland International Airport and in Troutdale. The various locations have distinct atmospheres. The airport has natural lighting and live plants. It has served pastries from Dos Hermanos Bakery.

== History and locations ==
The business was started by brothers Nick and Sam Purvis in 2014. There are six locations, as of 2023, including one at the Portland International Airport (Concourse B) and another in Troutdale. There are also coffee shops in the Slabtown area of northwest Portland's Northwest District and in southeast Portland's Buckman neighborhood. In downtown Portland, the business previously operated at the Woodlark Hotel.

Good Coffee's Common Good project donates a portion of sales to local nonprofit organizations.

== Reception ==
Lindsay D. Mattison included Good Coffee in Tasting Table's 2023 list of the fifteen best coffee shops in Portland.
