= Woodlark Building =

Historic building in Portland, Oregon, U.S.

- U.S. National Register of Historic Places
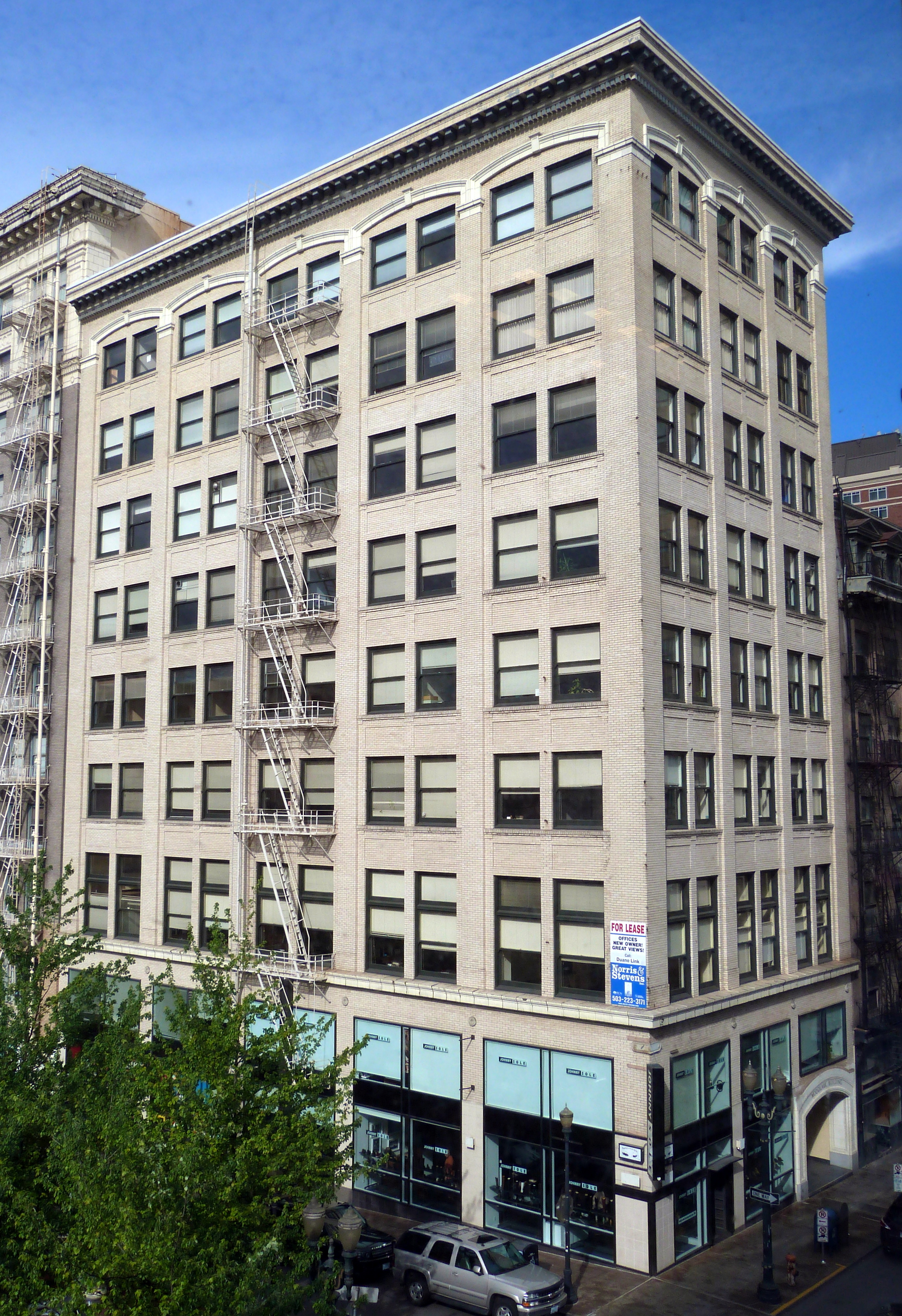
- The Woodlark Building in 2014

- Location within Portland, Oregon
- Location: 813–817 SW Alder Street; Portland, Oregon
- Coordinates: 45°31′14″N 122°40′50″W
- Area: less than one acre
- Built: 1911–12
- Built by: Hurley-Mason Company
- Architect: Doyle, Patterson & Beach
- Architectural style: Late 19th and Early 20th Century American Movements, Commercial
- NRHP reference No.: 14000482
- Added to NRHP: August 8, 2014

The Woodlark Building is a historic commercial building in downtown Portland, Oregon, United States that is listed on the National Register of Historic Places. The nine-story building was designed by Doyle, Patterson & Beach, and constructed in 1911–12. It has been described as "one of Portland's earliest commercial skyscrapers". From its completion until 1924, it was the headquarters of two jointly owned and very similarly named pharmaceutical companies based in Portland, the retail Woodard, Clarke & Company, and the wholesale Clarke-Woodward Company. It was converted into an office building in 1924. The retail space on the ground floor, mezzanine and basement has held a variety of businesses, in succession over the building's history, among the longest-lasting ones being a drugstore (1912–1927), a Sherman Clay piano and music store (1930–1974), and an independent shoe store (2000–2016).

In 2015, new owners announced plans to join the building to the adjacent Cornelius Hotel (a former hotel) and convert the two buildings into a hotel, with around 150 rooms. The new hotel is named The Woodlark and opened in December 2018.

== Background and etymology ==
The building was constructed as the new headquarters for the Portland-based retail and wholesale pharmaceutical companies owned by Louis G. Clarke (1855–1943) and William W. Woodward (1863–1940), and its name – originally written as "Wood-Lark" Building – was formed by combining parts of the two men's names. (The partners had employed the same practice when naming the 1907 building which previously served as their headquarters, the Cla-Wood Building, or Clawood Building, at Northwest 9th and Hoyt. That building was listed on the National Register in 1989, as the Clarke–Woodward Drug Company Building, but was later demolished and was delisted in 2000.)

The retail operation had been established in 1880 and formally incorporated in 1900 as Woodard, Clarke & Company, from a partnership between Louis Clarke and Charles H. Woodard, who retired from the business in 1904. In 1906, Clarke formed a new partnership with William Woodward, who had already been working for the company since 1882, to establish a wholesale drug business. The close similarity of the last names of Clarke's two successive partners has fostered confusion at times, compounded by the fact that the retail business continued to use the name Woodard, Clarke & Co. long after Charles Woodard's retirement, while the younger wholesale business carried the name Clarke-Woodward Company, using William Woodward's name, and the two jointly owned companies operated concurrently.

Construction of the building began in November 1911 and was completed in mid-1912.

== Description and original use ==
The building is located at the northeast corner of Southwest Alder Street and 9th Avenue (West Park Street at the time). Until 1924, it served as the companies' headquarters. A retail Woodard, Clarke & Company drugstore occupied the ground floor, basement and mezzanine levels, and the upper floors were used for Clarke-Woodward's wholesale operations. The store opened for business on August 26, 1912.

The building's footprint is 50 by 100 feet (15 m × 30 m). It has nine floors above ground and is 132 ft (40 m) tall. Designed by Portland-based Doyle, Patterson & Beach, the Woodlark Building uses Late 19th and Early 20th Century Commercial style, also featuring "strong Beaux-Arts influence in the elaborate cornice and other detailing."

== Usage after 1924 ==
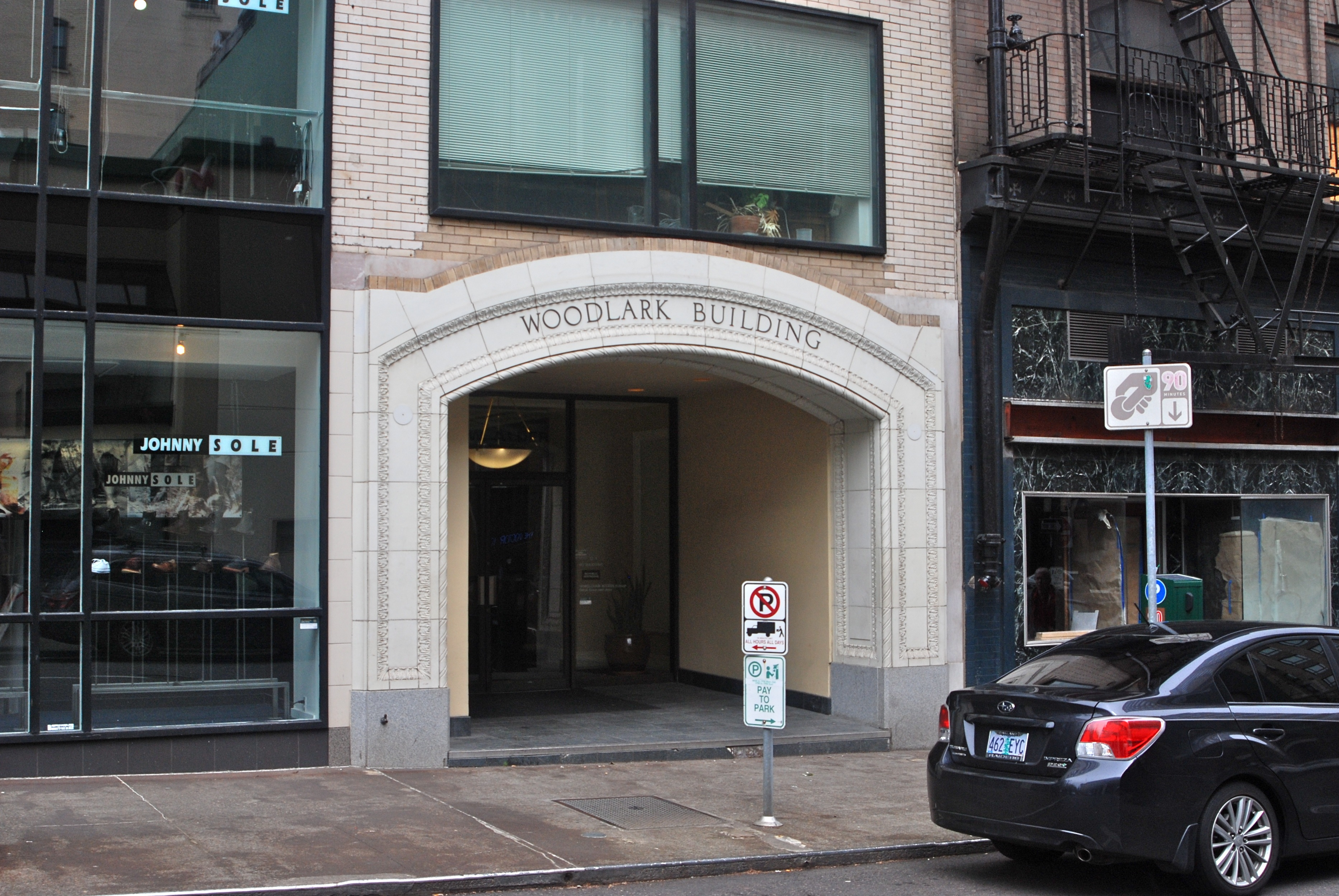
The new entrance built in 1924

In 1924, Clarke and Woodward sold their drug business to the Blumauer-Frank Drug Company and the wholesale drug business moved out of the building, but they retained ownership of the structure. The building's upper floors were converted into leasable office space. Other changes made at that time included a redesign and relocation of the building's main entry point, from West Park Street (now SW 9th Avenue) to a new entrance on Alder Street, at the building's southeast corner. The redesign was carried out by architect Emil Schacht and included a terracotta arch.

The main retail space continued to be used for a drugstore, changing from Woodard-Clarke to Liggett's in late 1925, until closing in late 1927. Glickman's, a women's clothing store, occupied the space for only a few months in 1928 before going out of business. Sherman Clay & Company, a seller of musical instruments and sheet music, moved into the space in January 1930 from a location elsewhere in downtown, occupying the basement, ground floor and mezzanine levels, initially under a 10-year lease. From 1951 to 1973, the building housed a finishing school and modeling agency first named the Maria Easterly Studio and after 1959 the Glorea Lavonne Finishing School. Sherman Clay remained in the building for 44 years, until 1974.

The Woodlark Building was listed on the National Register of Historic Places (NRHP) in 2014. It is located immediately adjacent to two other NRHP-listed buildings, the Cornelius Hotel, to the east, and the Stevens Building, to the north, and diagonally across from a third, the Galleria building.

Since 2000, the ground-floor retail tenant had been Johnny Sole, an independent shoe store. It closed in October 2016 with the start of work to convert the building into a hotel.

== Conversion into hotel ==
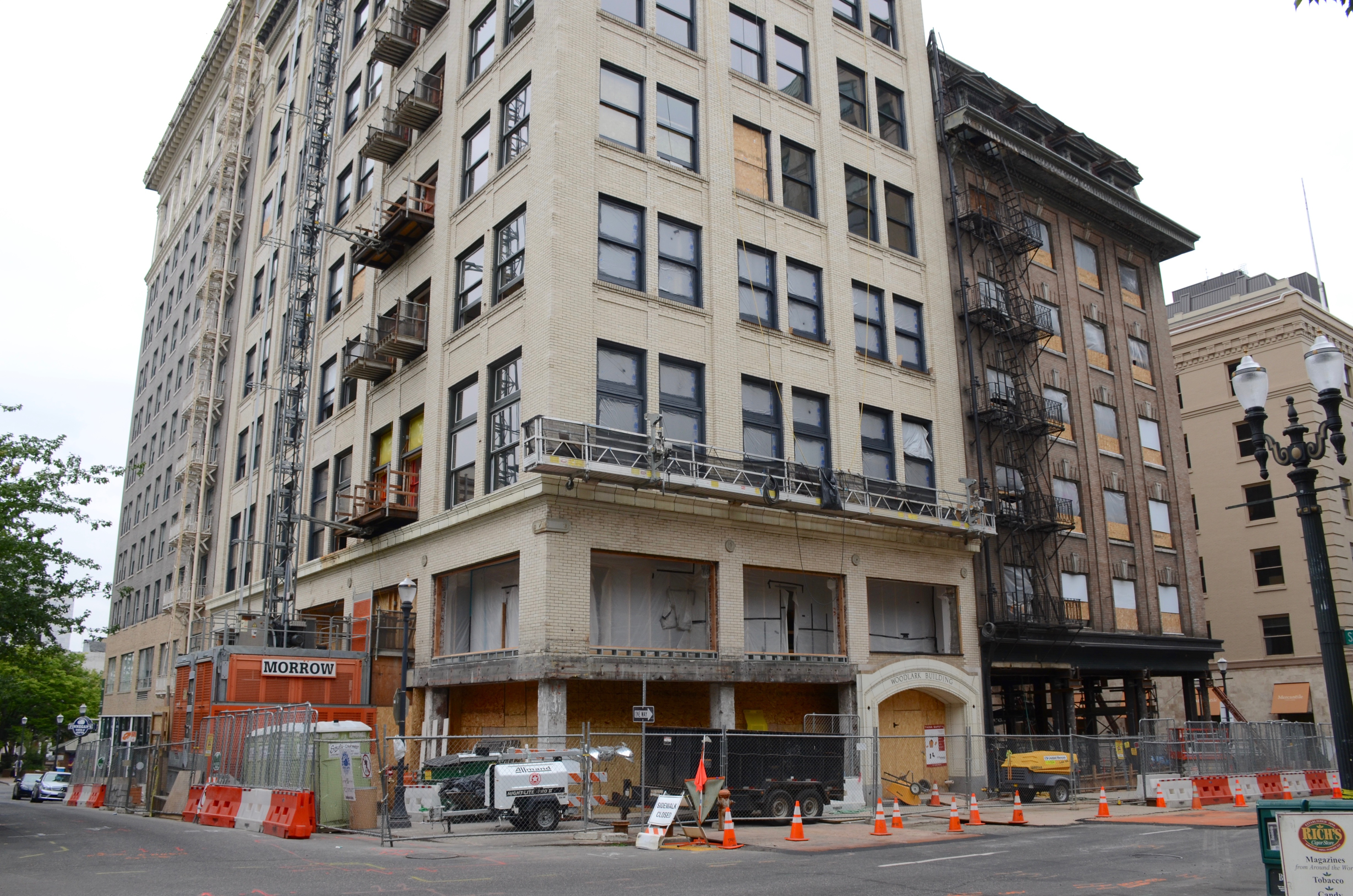
The Woodlark Building and the Cornelius Hotel undergoing renovation in 2017

In April 2014, the building was acquired by Arthur Mutal, a Portland real estate developer, at a cost of $8.65 million.

In January 2015, it was announced that the Woodlark Building was to be joined to the adjacent Cornelius Hotel, a former hotel now slated to be renovated, and converted for use as a hotel. The Cornelius Hotel building is also listed on the National Register of Historic Places. The planned renovation and conversion was expected to cost $30 million, funded by NBP Capital, Provenance Hotels and Arthur Mutal LLC. However, a December 2018 article in The Oregonian, after the work was completed, gave the cost as $70 million. As of 2015, the hotel created from the combined buildings was slated to have 151 rooms and two restaurants or bars.

Work on the conversion of the building began in September 2016. The hotel, named Woodlark House of Welcome, opened on December 15, 2018. Good Coffee has operated in the hotel.

== See also ==
- National Register of Historic Places listings in Southwest Portland, Oregon
