= Independent Garden Center Show =

Annual garden expo in Chicago

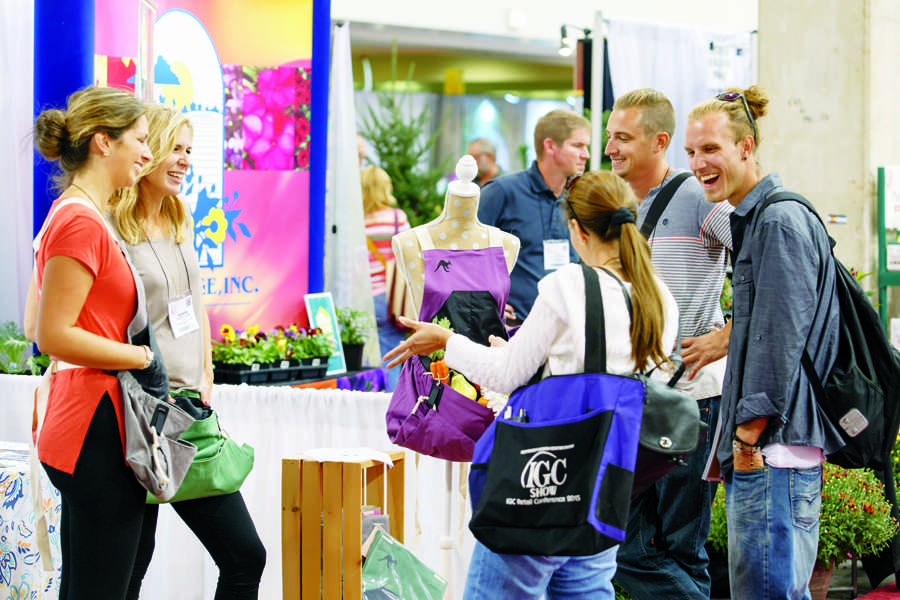
Vendors talking to visitors

The Independent Garden Center Show (IGC Show) is held every year since 2007 in Chicago, IL, in the United States.

== History ==
The IGC Show was created by Jeff and Cheryl Morey, co-directors of Garden Centers of America (GCA) and publishers of IGC Magazine. The first IGC Show was held in 2007, at Chicago's Navy Pier.

In 2014, IGC East convened at the Gaylord National Resort and Convention Center in National Harbor, MD. In 2015, IGC East relocated to the Baltimore Convention Center in Baltimore, MD. In 2016, the East Coast event relocated to the Valley Forge Casino Resort.

IGC Show 2018 reconvened at Chicago's Navy Pier. In 2019, citing ongoing construction at the Navy Pier, the show was moved to McCormick Place.

IGC Show 2019 was hosted in the Lakeside Center at McCormick Place.

== Description ==
The IGC Show is one of the largest shows for independent garden center owners, managers and buyers. The show is not open to large retail chain competitors or the general public.

The IGC Show presents garden center products available at wholesale. It is a juried show so every exhibiting company has been screened to ensure the products offered for sale are relevant to independent garden centers.

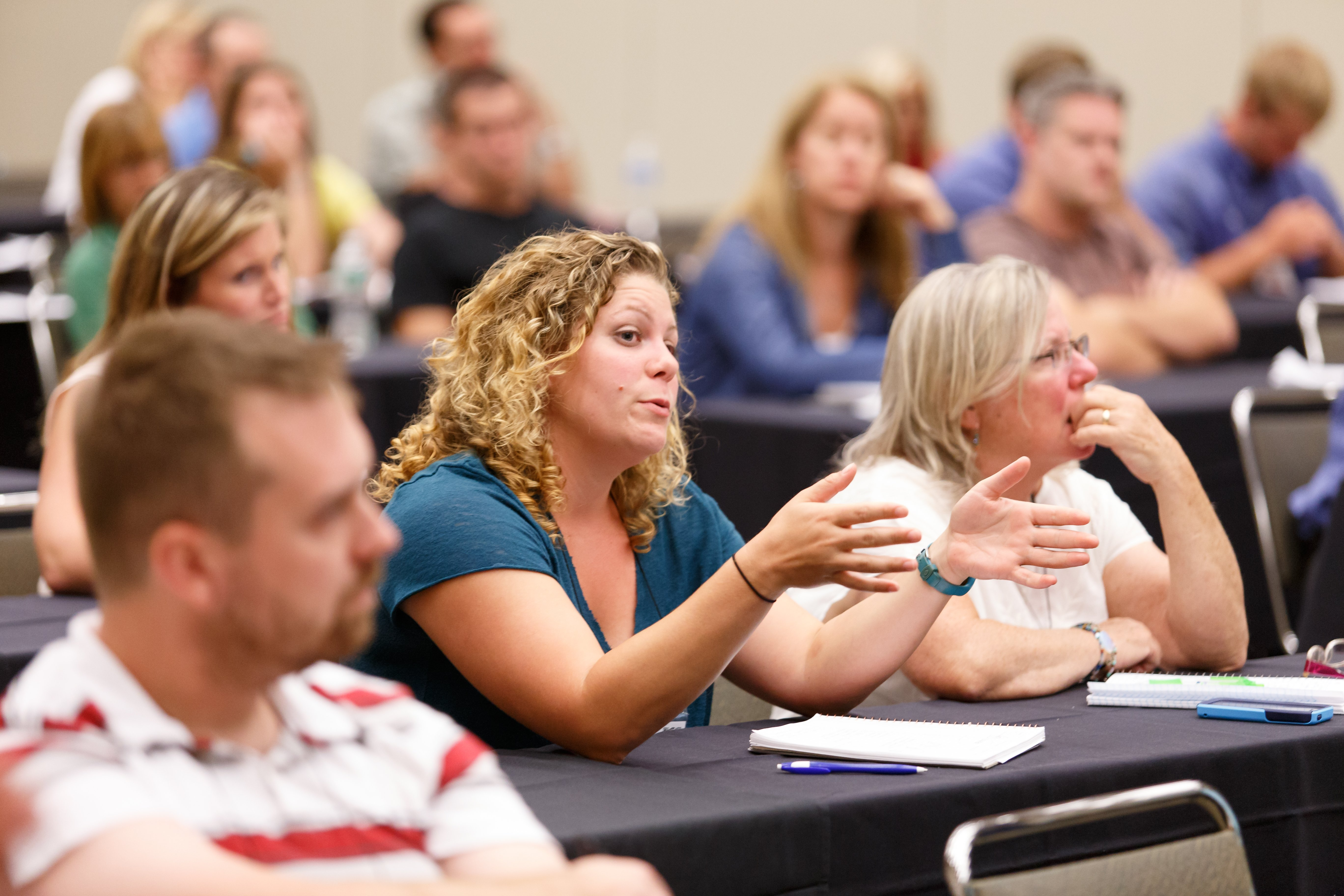
Education session

In addition to the trade show, the IGC Show hosts an educational conference on topics relevant to garden centers, such as customer service, inventory, signage, social media, store design, advertising, and more. Each day before the trade show opens, a keynote speaker starts the day.

The IGC Show provides a networking area. "Shop Talk" Retail Discussions, facilitated by a moderator, provide discussion on topics including marketing strategies, minimum wage increases, and younger customers .

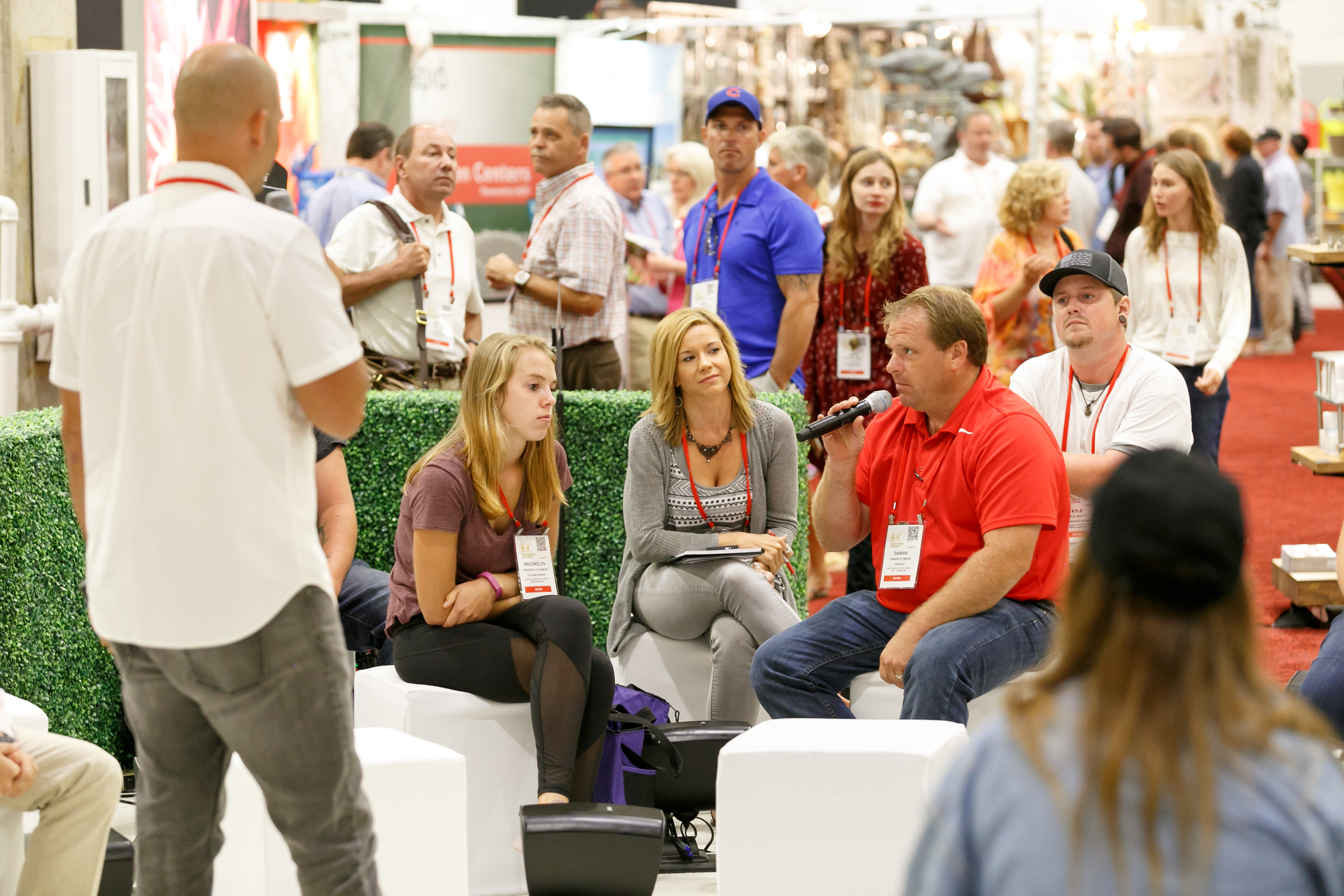
Shop Talk" Retail Discussions in the IGC Networking Lounge

IGC show provides a special area of vendor exhibits for companies that are new to the IGC Show and garden center industry. The New Product Zone features new products and plants submitted by vendors all across the show's exhibit space.

The 2019 show unveiled the IGC Retail Lab, a retail symposium and interactive design forum. It is designed to help IGC owners turn their stores into gathering spaces that capitalize on the most popular consumer trends.

== Contest ==
In 2017, the Best New Product and the Best New Plant awards contest was started. Garden center retailers voted for their favorite new products and plants.

=== Best new product ===
- 2017 - first place Kreative Gardens of Miami, FL; second place went to Potwheelz Garden Dolly of Gulf Breeze, FL.
- 2018 - first place TrashCan of Portsmouth, NH; the second place to Grass Flip Flops of Westlake Village, CA.
- 2019 - first-place Complete Grow Kits from A Pot for Pot of Oakland, CA; second place Fir Needle Products from Bedrock Tree Farm of Wakefield, RI.

=== Best new plant ===
- 2017 - first place Regal Petticoat Maple from Sester Farms in Gresham, OR; the second place 'Gold Breeze' Zebra Grass from Hortech in Spring Lake, MI.
- 2018 - the first place Hollywood Hibiscus from J Berry Nursery of Grand Saline, TX; the second place Endless Summer Hydrangeas Summer Crush from Bailey Nurseries of St. Paul, MN.
- 2019 - first-place Best New Plant plant arrangement of Yellow Star, Large Capitata Maroon and Tropiflora from Russell's Bromeliads of Clermont, FL; the second-place First Editions Iceberg Alley Sageleaf Willow from Bailey of St. Paul, MN.

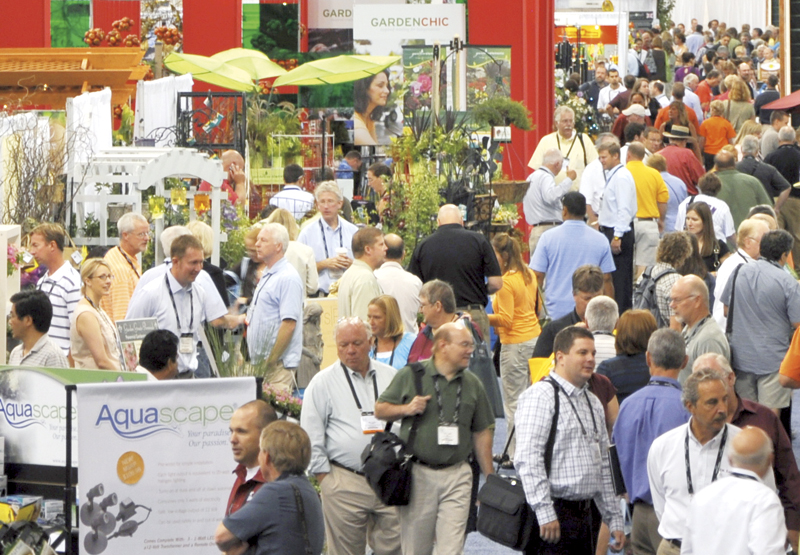
IGC Show

== Previous shows ==
- 2019 to 2020: McCormick Place
- 2017 to 2018: - Navy Pier
- 2016 -, Valley Forge Casino Resort; Navy Pier
- 2015 - Baltimore Convention Center;, Navy Pier
- 2014 - Gaylord National Resort and Convention Center;, Navy Pier
- 2007 to 2013 - Navy Pier r

== Keynote speakers ==
- 2019 – Mark Bellingr
- 2019 – Jeff Baxter
- 2019 – Dr. Bridget Behe, Professor of Horticultural Marketing at Michigan State University
- 2018 – Bob Negen, retail speaker
- 2018 – Daymond John
- 2018 – Dr. Charlie Hall, Professor and Ellison Chair in International Floriculture at Texas A&M University
- 2017 – Bob Phibbs, CEO of The Retail Doctor
- 2017 – Robert J. O'Neill,
- 2017 – John Stanley, international IGC retail consultant of John Stanley Associates
- 2016 – Corey Bordine, Consultant for MonkeyBar Management and former president of Bordine Nursery

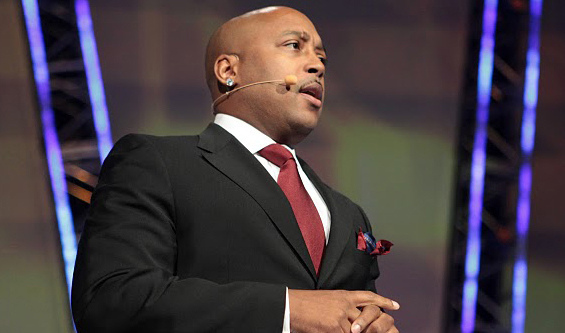
Daymond John

- 2016 – Mike Ditka,
- 2016 – Amanda Thomsen, Kiss My Aster Garden Blogger
- 2016 – Bruce Crawford, Director of Rutgers' Gardens, Rutgers University's arboretum & public garden
- 2016 – Jonathan Bardzik, Chef & Garden Cookbook Author
- 2016 – John Tierney, The New York Times Science Columnist
- 2015 – Martha Stewart
- 2015 – Marcus Lemonis
- 2015 – Robert Hendrickson, Business Story Developer for Next New Planet, Marketing Service Provider for The Garden Center Group, and IGC Magazine columnist
- 2015 – Lloyd Traven, President of Peace Tree Farm
- 2015 – Ernest Wertheim, Principal of Wertheim, Van Der Ploeg, & Klemeyer
- 2014 – Martha Stewart
- 2014 – Corey Bordine
- 2014 – Willie Degel
- 2014 – Henry Hutcheson, President of Family Business USA and IGC Magazine columnist
- 2014 – Peter Shankman
- 2013 – Taniya Nayak, Designer, TV Personality and Host of HGTV's House Hunters on Vacation

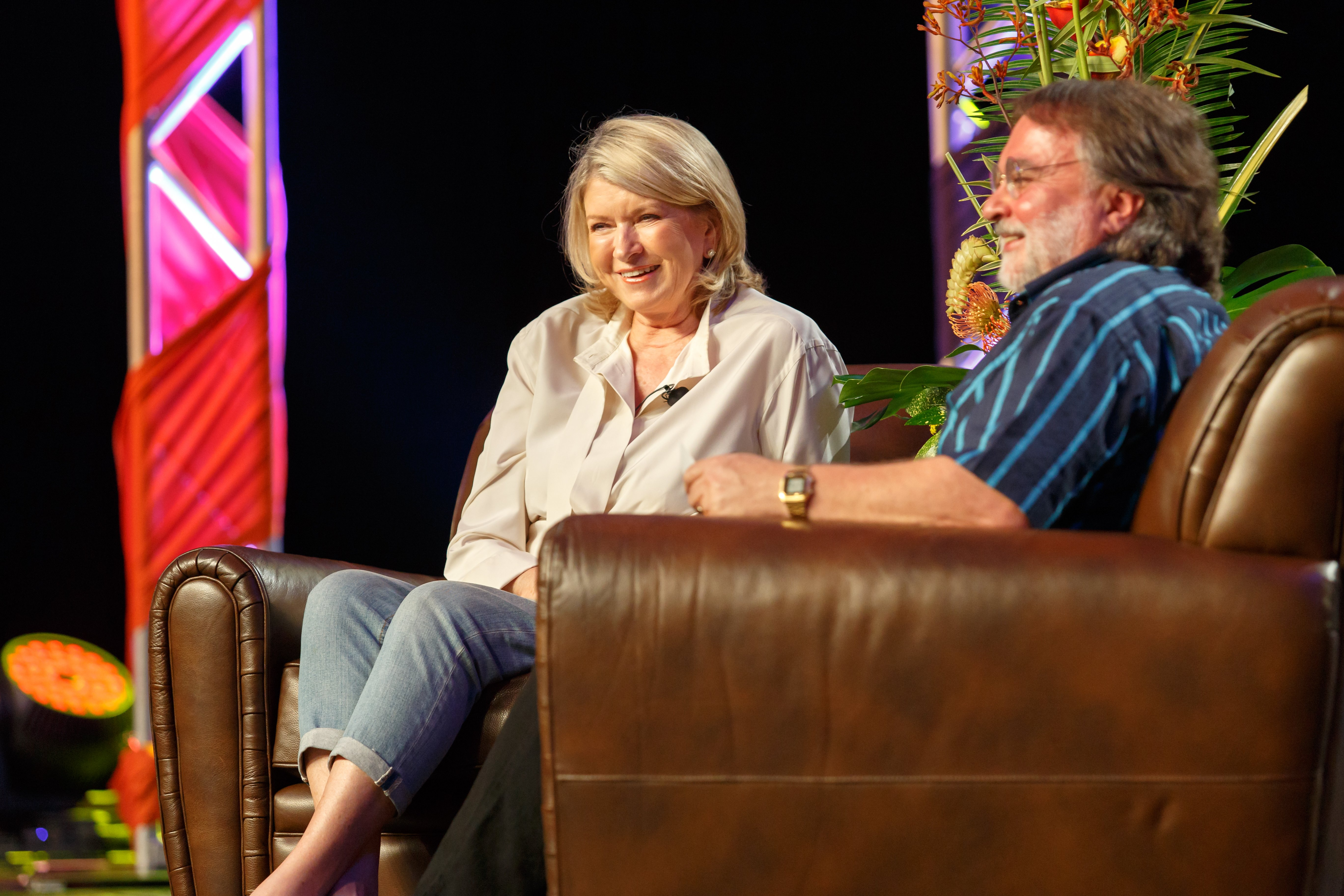
r Martha Stewart with Jeff Morey during an interview keynote at the 2014 IGC Show .

- 2013 – Peter Shankman
- 2013 – John Stanley, IGC Magazine columnist
- 2012 – Rick Baylessf
- 2012 – Corey Bordine
- 2012 – Joe Lamp’l, Founder of The Joe Gardener Company, Garden Writer, Author and Host of GardenSmart and Fresh from the Garden
- 2012 – Joseph Pine, Co-founder of Strategic Horizons and Starizon Studio, and Co-author of The Experience Economy: Work is Theater & Every Business a Stage
- 2011 – P. Allen Smith
- 2011 – Paco Underhill, Founder of Envirosell, Author and Professional Speaker
- 2011 – Larry Winget
- 2010 – Howard Bloom,
- 2010 – Corey Bordine

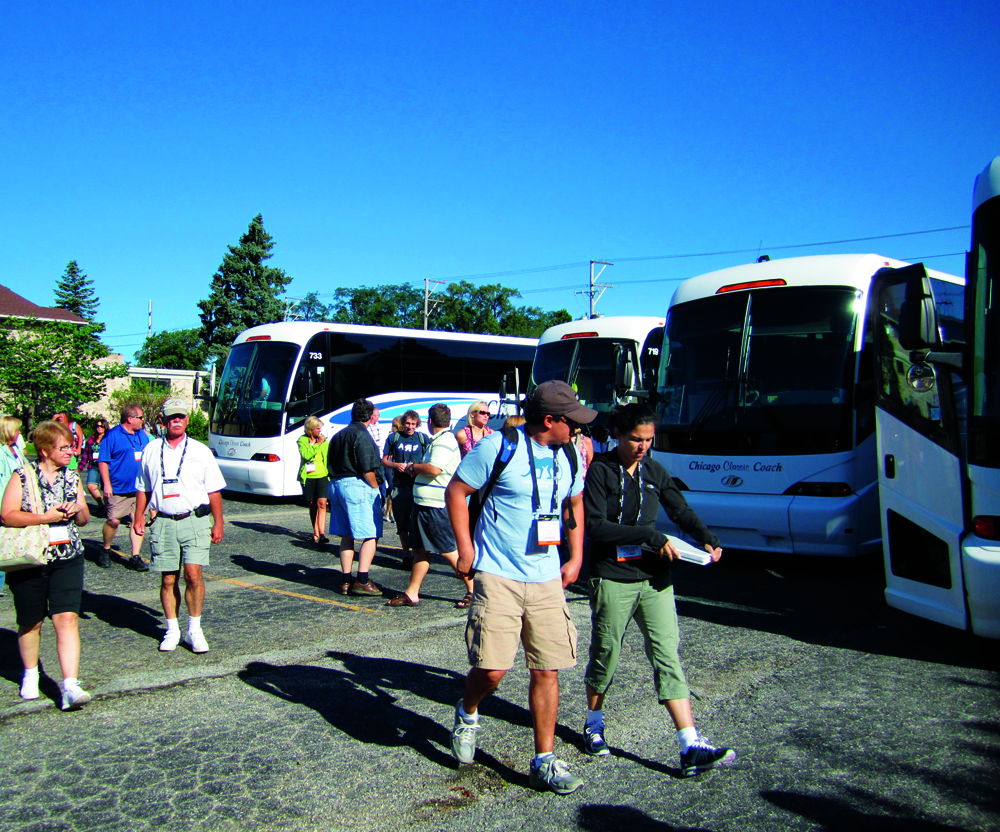
IGC retailers tour garden centers in the surrounding areas

- 2010 – Jamie Durie
- 2010 – Josh Viertel, President of Slow Food USA
- 2009 – Robert Hendrickson, Business Story Developer for Next New Planet, Marketing Service Provider for The Garden Center Group, and IGC Magazine columnist
- 2009 – John Moore, Marketing executive for Starbucks and Whole Foods
- 2009 – Dr. Patrick Moore, Co-founder of Greenpeace
- 2008 – Corey Bordine
- 2008 – Diarmuid Gavin, President of Diarmuid Gavin Designs
- 2008 – Dick Hayne, CEO of Urban Outfitters
- 2008 – John Kinsella, Managing Director of Terrain
- 2008 – John Stanley
- 2007 – Susie Coelho
- 2007 – Leatrice Eiseman, Executive Director of Pantone Color Institute
- 2007 – Charles Fishman, Author of The Wal-Mart Effect
- 2007 – Robyn Waters, Author of The Trendmaster’s Guide

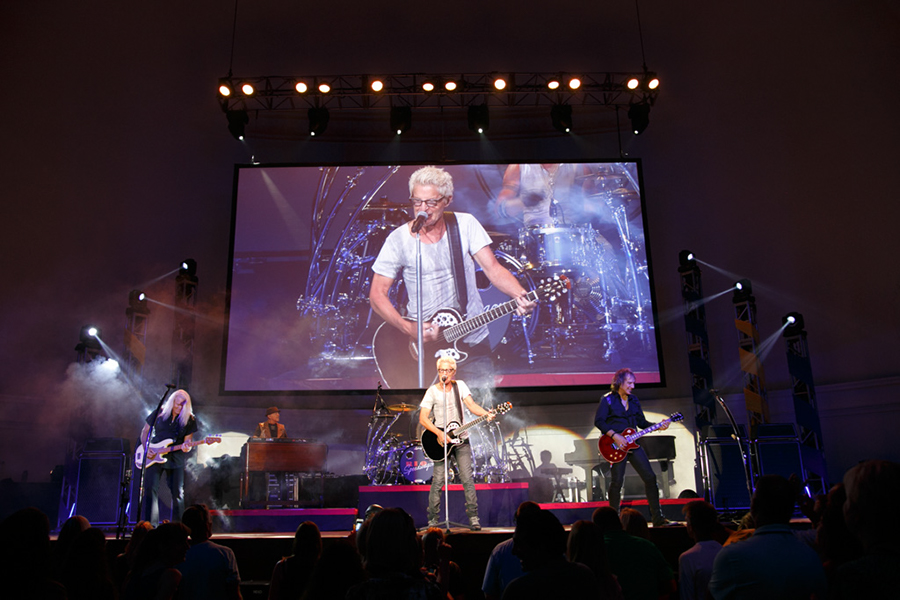
REO Speedwagon performed in 2016.

== Concerts at IGS shows ==
- 2019: Jefferson Starship
- 2018: The Marshall Tucker Band
- 2017: Blue Öyster Cult
- 2016: REO Speedwagon; Gloria Gaynor
- 2015: Gin Blossoms
- 2014: Don Felder
- 2013: 38 Special
- 2012: Dennis DeYoung, Music of Styx
- 2011: Lou Gramm
- 2010: America
- 2009: Charlie Daniels Band
- 2008: Kansas
- 2007: Rick Derringer

== Founders ==
- Jeff Morey and Cheryl Morey
- IGC Magazine
- Garden Centers of America (GCA)
