= IGC =

IGC may stand for:

== Companies ==
- Intelligent Graphics Corporation, marketer of the VM/386 multitasking operating system or 'control program'
- Istituto Geografico Centrale, an Italian private mapping company
- Immortals Gaming Club, an esports company
- Inquirer Group of Companies, a Philippine mass media conglomerate

== Politics ==
- Intergovernmental Conference, the formal procedure for negotiating amendments to the founding treaties of the European Union
- Intergovernmental Committee on Intellectual Property and Genetic Resources, Traditional Knowledge and Folklore of the World Intellectual Property Organization
- International Grains Council, an intergovernmental organisation concerned with grains trade
- Iraqi Governing Council, the provisional government of Iraq from July 13, 2003 to June 1, 2004

== Science ==
- Inverse gas chromatography, an analytical technique in the analysis of the surfaces of solids
- Interchromatin granule cluster, a nanostructure inside the cell nucleus

== Organizations ==
- Intergovernmental Commission, which regulates the Channel Tunnel
- International Gender Champions, an organizationworking for gender equality
- International Geological Congress, a convention held by the International Union of Geological Sciences
- International Grains Council, an intergovernmental organization
- International Growth Centre, a research institute associated with the London School of Economics, England
- Institute for Global Communications or IGC Internet, an institution that provides Internet presence for groups deemed "progressive"
- Instituto Gulbenkian de Ciência, a biological research-oriented institute belonging to the Gulbenkian Foundation, Oeiras, Portugal
- International Gliding Commission or FAI Gliding Commission, the international governing body for the sport of gliding which standardized .igc file format.
- International Gospel Centre, the headquarters of Word of Life Bible Church, Warri, Nigeria

== Other uses ==
- IAPMO Guide Criteria, IAPMO Standards for the International Association of Plumbing and Mechanical Officials
- IGC Centre, a lava dome in Mount Edziza Provincial Park, British Columbia, Canada
- Independent Garden Center Show or IGC Show, Chicago, Illinois, US
- Instant Game Collection, a feature of PS Plus on Sony's PlayStation Network (PSN/SEN)
- Intergranular corrosion or intergranular attack, a form of corrosion
- The IGC code, a standard of the International Maritime Organisation for liquefied gas tanker ships.
