= Suitland murders =

Unsolved serial murder case

Suitland murderer

Details
- Victims: 5–9
- Span of crimes: 1986–1987
- Country: United States
- States: Maryland, possibly Washington, D.C.

The Suitland murders refers to a series of murders of young girls and women committed from October 1986 to January 1987 in the unincorporated area of Suitland, Maryland, considered a suburb of Washington, D.C. All victims were black, and each had been sexually assaulted and stabbed afterwards.

During the investigation, police arrested a resident of D.C., Alton Alonso Best, for the murder of a girl that was never officially linked to the other killings but who was considered a possible suspect. The killings stopped after his arrest but he has never been charged with any of them.

== Murders ==
As victims, the killer chose young, dark-skinned girls of slender build, short in stature, and with short hair. The first of them was 20-year-old Dorothy Ann Miller, whose body was found in a wooded area in Suitland on December 13, 1986. During the investigation, an autopsy determined that she had been viciously raped before her death, but that the cause of death itself was a drug overdose.

On January 12, 1987, employees of the local Bradbury Recreational Center found pieces of women's clothing on a tree in the bushes near the facility, with further exploration leading to the discovery of a body. The victim was identified as 25-year-old Pamela Malcolm, who had evidently been raped and stabbed to death. Malcolm was a local who lived less than one mile away from where her body had been discovered.

On the next day, while investigating Malcolm's murder, a 75-member task force cordoned off the area amounting to eight acres in order to conduct a search operation. During this, they found two additional corpses which were identified later on as 22-year-old Cynthia Lee Westbury and 26-year-old Juanita Marie Walls. Both women had been raped and had multiple stab wounds. The day after, the body of yet another woman, 22-year-old Angela Maria Wilkerson who had been reported missing on January 5, was found not far off, having suffered from the same injuries as the previous victims.

A background check on the victims revealed that four out of five of them lived in southeast Washington, D.C., about one kilometer apart from one another, and that all with the exception of Malcolm (an employee of the USPTO) were unemployed. The medical examiner who performed the autopsies on the bodies was unable to determine the exact dates of death.

Upon delving into the victims' past, investigators started to uncover the circumstances of their disappearances. Malcolm was last seen on the evening of October 21, 1986 when she left her apartment in Suitland, which she shared with her mother, to buy a pack of cigarettes and never returned. Nine days later, Walls left her apartment in D.C. to attend a birthday party organized by her family and friends, but was reported missing after failing to arrive. On November 10, Westbury left her apartment to meet up with a friend, but vanished on the way there.

The bodies of the three women, all of which were in a state of severe decomposition, indicated that they had been killed shortly after they disappeared. Because of this, law enforcement officials declared in February 1987 that Dorothy Miller, whose body was found first, was likely the fourth canonical victim due to the fact her body was not as decomposed as the rest.

== Investigation ==
In mid-January 1987, the Prince George's County Police Department set a special task force of 25 officers to investigate the crimes which, over the next few days, raided a variety of establishments in the red-light districts of D.C., as well as interviewing numerous witnesses, including relatives, friends, neighbors, shopkeepers, bar owners and other residents who could potentially provide useful information. During these interviews, officers learned that at least two of the women frequented a local bar, Clancy's, based in southeast D.C., and could have been acquainted with one another. This rumor was then quickly disproven by the owner of the bar, Ed Byrd, as well as his employees, who claimed that they had never seen the women.

During the investigation, officers found a young man who claimed that on the day of her disappearance, he had seen Westbury sitting in a gold-colored car near her home, which then quickly sped away. According to him, the car was driven by a stranger wearing some type of hat. Another victim, Walls, had recently been fired from her job as a cashier at a Garden Center, after her supervisor accused of her fraudulently selling some of the store's plants. According to court documents, the pair engaged in an argument during which Walls was alleged to have assaulted him using a sharp hand tool, for which she was due to be charged with assault. It was also revealed that at least one of the victims had been involved in prostitution, leading the police to concentrate their search on people involved in the business or who had been prosecuted for sexual crimes in the past, most of whom were written off later on.

In late January, the Prince George's County police clashed with the leaders of a local chapter of the Guardian Angels, who had begun patrolling the streets of Suitland and southeast D.C. When confronted, police accused members of the non-profit of obstructing the investigation, claiming that residents who might have crucial information were more likely to provide information to members of the Guardian Angels rather than law enforcement, due to the negative reputation the latter had received during the 1980s.

== Suspect ==
On January 30, 1987, police identified a potential suspect in the killings: a 30-year-old unemployed resident of D.C., Alton Alonso Best, who had recently been charged with the murder of 20-year-old Janice Elaine Morton, a nurse's aide at a hospital in D.C. According to the investigators, Morton had been killed inside a van that belonged to Best's nephew, William Armah, a D.C. police officer who had been placed on leave. On February 3, about 120 Suitland residents picketed in front of the police station in an effort to learn more about the investigations, as well as to voice their concerns and fears about possible further murders. In mid-February, Prince George's County police officials said that while no evidence had been unearthed to charge Best with the killings, they reiterated that he remained the prime suspect.

It was later determined that Best knew at least three of the victims. In early spring, police received a call from a man who claimed that he had seen one of the women in Best's black van, shortly before she disappeared. It was also confirmed that in 1984, Best and Armah had lived in a house in Suitland which was approximately one kilometer away from the wooded area where the victims' bodies would later be discovered. Best and at least one of the victims were both addicted to drugs, and even purchased from the same drug dealer in southeast D.C., while another victim lived on the same street as his ex-wife and his kids.

While all this circumstantial evidence pointed towards Best's involvement, he categorically denied knowing any of them. Nevertheless, suspicions about him were heightened when it was discovered that he had been charged with armed robbery and kidnapping in 1981, using the same black van. Court documents reported that Best robbed two young women and forced them at gunpoint into the back of the van, where he tied them up. The victims later claimed Best told them of his intention to take them to Maryland, but while the van was moving, they managed to free themselves from the restraints and escape. Despite their testimony, all charges against Best were dropped after a deal was reached between him and the victims, who said that they had made amends with them.

Later on, Armah's van was sent for analysis at a lab in Quantico, Virginia, where they planned to examine traces of blood found inside it. But in late April, police officials told the media that no forensic evidence linking the van with the crimes has been located. Armah himself told the investigators during questioning that he had helped his uncle wash off bloodstains in the vehicle's interior at his request, but Best supposedly claimed that the blood came from one of his friends.

Ultimately, Best was charged with the murder of Morton. During the trial, on the advice of his attorneys, he accepted a plea deal with the prosecutor's office in which he would confess to the crime, and in exchange, the charges would be changed from first-degree to second-degree murder and an unrelated drug charge would be dismissed. On June 10, Best pleaded guilty to the murder and sodomy of Morton, and in his confession, he admitted that during his spare time, he would date, offer drugs and ask for sexual favors from marginalized young girls and women.

=== Murder of Janice Morton ===
On January 15, 1987, Best claimed that he was at a friend's house when Morton joined them. The group shared alcohol and cocaine for some time, after which Best decided to go to a drug dealer he knew for a new shipment, offering Morton to accompany him. According to his testimony, Morton refused to have sex with him in exchange for cocaine during the trip, whereupon he assaulted the girl in the van, beating, sodomizing and ultimately strangling her using her own bra. He never admitted involvement in the other crimes, though he was still considered a prime suspect.

Under the terms of the plea deal, Best was sentenced to 18 years and 4 months imprisonment in August 1987. Although no clear evidence points to him being the Suitland murderer, the killings ceased after his arrest, which the police and media have used to support the argument that he was the perpetrator.

Additionally, Best was also investigated for a series of murders of black prostitutes in Los Angeles, California. Two detectives, John St. John and Fred Miller, checked him for involvement in February 1987, but nothing new was uncovered. In later years, it was revealed that the Southside Slayer, as the supposed killer had been nicknamed, was actually at least six different and unrelated serial killers who had no connection to the Suitland murders.

== D.C. murders ==
On April 5, the naked corpse of a woman was found on a street in D.C. Five days later, while Best was incarcerated, the police received a call from a 25-year-old resident of Suitland who claimed that a stranger had attempted to drag her into a dark-colored van and abduct her. While investigating the incident, while they were unable to catch the kidnapper, police realized that the attack had occurred only a block away from Pamela Maria Malcolm's home.

While they were still investigating the kidnapping, police received a report on April 15 about the location of another body on a street in D.C. The victim was Donna Nichols, who had been beaten to death. On June 24, the body of 21-year-old Cheryl Henderson was found in a wooded area near southeast D.C., less than two kilometers from Suitland, with her killer having cut her throat. On September 21, the body of an unidentified young woman was found in an abandoned housing complex. No definitive connection has been established between these killings and those in Suitland, as the official stance on the crimes is that they ended with Best's arrest.

== See also ==
- List of fugitives from justice who disappeared
- List of serial killers in the United States

== Bibliography ==
- Newton, Michael (2009). The encyclopedia of unsolved crimes. New York: Facts on File. pp. 234–235. ISBN 9781438119144.
- Nigel, Cawthorne (2011). The Mammoth Book of Killers at Large. Constable & Robinson. ISBN 9781780333625.
