= Tom Hunter =

Scottish businessman (born 1961)

Sir Thomas Blane Hunter
- Born: 6 May 1961 (age 65); New Cumnock, Ayrshire, Scotland
- Education: University of Strathclyde
- Occupations: Property and sports goods

Sir Thomas Blane Hunter (born 6 May 1961) is a Scottish businessman and philanthropist.

== Early life ==
Hunter grew up in the mining village of New Cumnock in Ayrshire. His father was a grocer in the village.

== Sports Division ==
Hunter set up his first business after graduating from the University of Strathclyde as he was, in his own words, "unemployable". With a £5,000 loan from his grocer father Campbell and matching funds from a bank, he started selling trainers from the back of a van. Hunter built the business into Europe's largest independent retailer. In 1998 in an unsolicited offer, Dave Whelan's JJB Sports offered to buy the larger Sports Division for £290 million; Hunter accepted, earning himself £252 million.

== Other business activities ==
Hunter had expanded Sports Division through financing supplied by the Royal Bank of Scotland, but when he proposed the takeover of Olympus Sports, RBS refused to finance the deal. Through his friend Sir David Murray, he met Halifax Bank of Scotland governor Gavin Masterton on a trip to watch Rangers F.C. play Juventus, and subsequently built his business on the HBoS relationship.

Senior lending manager Peter Cummings introduced Hunter to property development, which resulted in his purchase of stakes in builder Crest Nicholson, and retirement homebuilder McCarthy & Stone. In 2001 Cummings introduced Hunter to fellow HBoS client Nick Leslau, which led to the purchase of stakes via Leslau's Prestbury Investment Holdings in the freehold property portfolios of Travelodge hotels, licensed premises; and the theme park portfolio of Merlin Entertainments, including Alton Towers.

In August 2013, Hunter put up a huge cash loan that enabled his friend David Moulsdale, founder of Optical Express eye surgery clinics, to save his company from closure after the Royal Bank of Scotland threatened to seize control.

In September 2020, Hunter sold £52 million of shares in The Hut Group when the business joined the stock market. He subsequently sold a further £31 million in January 2021. He retains a stake worth £105 million.

== West Coast Capital ==
In March 2001, Hunter was a founding partner of West Coast Capital, the private equity arm of the Hunter Family. Through this firm he has become a major shareholder in a number of retailers – including USC, Office, D2, Qube; and 8% of British Home Stores (BHS), with the bulk owned by Sir Philip Green, subsequently disposing of them all. His other investments included Wyevale Garden Centres.

At its height, West Coast invested in over 50 companies, and Hunter was touted as a possible bidder for Selfridges – he lost out to Galen Weston. However, due to the 2008 financial crisis, he sold his stake in Dobbies Garden Centres to partner Tesco, lost his entire holding in Crest Nicholson; and a majority of his stakes in McCarthy & Stone and Wyevale Garden Centres.

West Coast Capital now holds a number of major investments in property, e-commerce and data analytics including a large stake in listed Secure Income Reit Plc, majority control of the £1 billion Winchburgh Village development and a substantial stake in Order Dynamics. West Coast Capital directly funds, alongside the Hunter Family, venture philanthropy, The Hunter Foundation.

One of the investments the company holds is a 3.37% stake in the Hut Group, which was worth £151.6 million when the company listed on the London Stock Exchange in September 2020.

== Philanthropy ==
Advised to move to Monaco after the sale of Sports Division, Hunter wanted to raise his family in his homeland. He came to the realisation that making money was, as he told Andrew Marr in a 2005 BBC interview, "only half of the equation", and also from the inspiration of his acknowledged hero Andrew Carnegie, in particular Carnegie's book The Gospel of Wealth and Carnegie's sentiment that "a man who dies rich, dies disgraced". Hunter and his wife Marion, Lady Hunter, subsequently established The Hunter Foundation in 1998 with a £10 million cheque as a tax management vehicle. After discussions with Vartan Gregorian, head of the Carnegie Foundation in New York City, Hunter set a cause and a method which has resulted in the foundation donating in excess of £50m to supporting educational and entrepreneurial projects in Scotland and sustainable development in sub-Saharan Africa in partnership with former President Bill Clinton through the Clinton Hunter Development Initiative.

In 2001, Hunter was interviewed for the STV programme Rich, Gifted and Scots, discussing his wealth, influences and philanthropy. Hunter coined the term "venture philanthropy" – using his investment pledges to leverage more cash from others to invest with him and becoming involved in the strategic delivery of the initiatives he backed. This ensured he could make a bigger impact with his money.

Hunter's donations and beneficial projects have included:

- £6m to the Band Aid appeal.
- £1m to support the Make Poverty History campaign.
- £100,000 in a £500,000 joint project with the Scottish Executive.
- £5m donation to establish the Hunter Centre for Entrepreneurship at the University of Strathclyde
- £4 million to the Children in Need charity appeal telethon, including a £3 million donation to the Children in Need Rickshaw Challenge 2019.
- £1 million to the Comic Relief charity appeal. Matched the £1 million raised during Comic Relief Does The Apprentice.
- US$10–25 million to the William J. Clinton Foundation.
- £1 million distributed between the Alzheimer's Society and Music for Dementia in November 2020, inspired by Paul Harvey, a retired teacher and pianist suffering from dementia whose four-note piano tune went viral online, and subsequently was arranged into a charity single performed by the BBC Philharmonic.
- He offered to match donations to Paddy McGuinness' Children in Need challenge to ride a Raleigh Chopper from Wrexham to Glasgow up to £3 million.
- On 16 March 2026, the Hunter Foundation pledged to match donations (up to £1 million) to BBC Radio 1's Greg James' "The Longest Ride Challenge" (to ride 1000km from Weymouth to Edinburgh on a tandem bicycle) for Comic Relief. The news was broken to James by Katie Thistleton live on television.

Scotland's former first minister, Jack McConnell, has said of Hunter:

His philanthropic work and the creative way that he has thrown himself into that have been one of the most significant drivers for change in Scotland in the last decade. The work his foundation does is all about being a catalyst for change, not a substitute and not a general giveaway but a genuine approach to change the way things are done.

In October 2013, Hunter was awarded the Carnegie Medal of Philanthropy. Described by some as the "Nobel Prize for philanthropy", the medal recognises those who use their private wealth for public good and is awarded biannually to global figures leading the way in this field. He dedicated the award to his father, who he describes as his "hero and inspiration". He also donated over £1,000,000 to Children in Need in 2018.

After the death of former Scottish First Minister Alex Salmond in Ohrid, North Macedonia on 12 October 2024, Hunter agreed to finance the repatriation of his body to Scotland.

== Politics ==
In 2001, Hunter was one of the Labour Party's top 50 donors, giving £100,000 to its head office.

In August 2014, Hunter unveiled the scotlandseptember18.com website dedicated to providing impartial sources of information related to the Scottish independence referendum. The site focused on 16 questions central to the referendum debate.

== Recognition ==
In 1997, he was awarded Alumnus of the Year by the University of Strathclyde.

In 2005 he received a knighthood for "services to Philanthropy and to Entrepreneurship in Scotland".

In 2013 he was awarded the Carnegie Medal of Philanthropy.

== Personal life ==
Hunter and his wife Marion, Lady Hunter, have three adult children.

In 2001, Hunter is reputed to have spent £1m on his 40th birthday party, at which Stevie Wonder performed. The party was held at his home in Cap Ferrat, on the Côte d'Azur, which he sold to a Russian business for reputedly £55m in late 2007.

In April 2007, Hunter was reported in the Sunday Times Rich List as the first ever home-grown billionaire in Scotland, with an estimated wealth of £1.05 billion. Due to the 2008 financial crisis, which reduced an estimated £250 million from his fortune, Hunter was overtaken as Scotland's richest man in late 2007 by Jim McColl, head of Glasgow engineering firm Clyde Blowers, who has an estimated fortune of £800 million. According to the Sunday Times Rich List in 2021, Hunter is now worth £729 million.
