= West Seattle Nursery =

Garden center and plant nursery in Seattle, Washington, U.S.

Coordinates: 47.5543°N 122.3872°W

- Logo

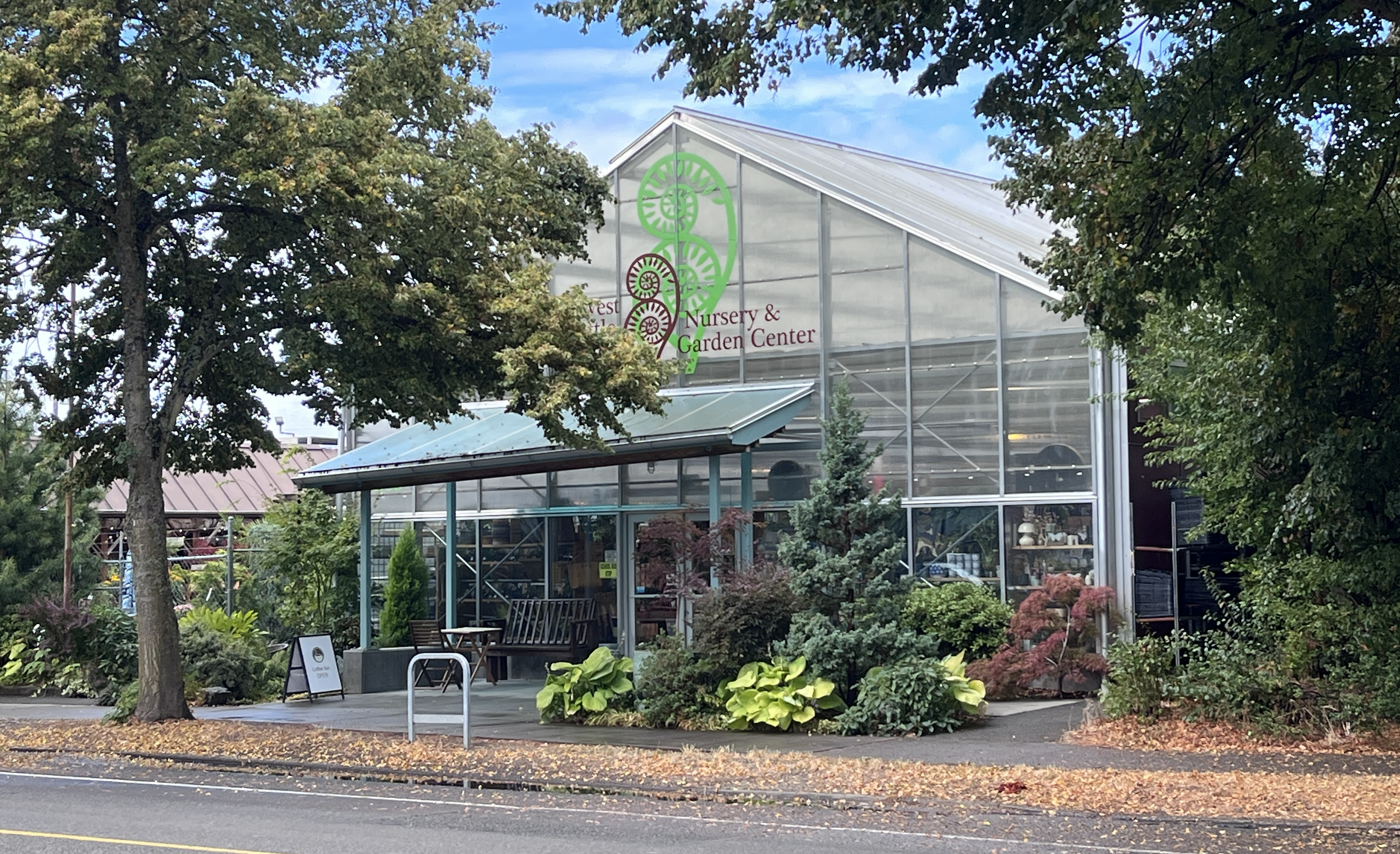
- Founded: 1983
- Founders: Mark Smith; Irene Stewart
- Headquarters: Seattle, Washington, United States
- Website: westseattlenursery.com

West Seattle Nursery & Garden Center, or simply West Seattle Nursery, is a garden center and plant nursery in West Seattle, Washington, United States. It was established in 1983.

== Description ==
West Seattle Nursery (WSN) is a self-proclaimed "eclectic group of horticulturalists and plant enthusiasts working together for the edification, service and common good of gardeners everywhere". It has a coffee bar, a gift shop, and a greenhouse. WSN sells indoor and outdoor plants, including houseplants, as well as books, candles, jewelry, terrariums, and other household products. It also stocks mushroom grow kits as well as Christmas trees and wreaths. Other services include design consulting, gardening classes for children, and tool sharpening.

== History ==
The business was established by Mark Smith and Irene Stewart in 1983. It has operated at its current location on California Avenue since 1990, and has been expanded. In 2014, WSN offered Smith's adjacent house at no cost to anyone who could relocate the structure. Smith retired in 2019. Marcia Bruno became an owner.

In 2007, Seattle Public Utilities said WSN offered earth-friendly products and was "doing an especially good job educating customers on safe, sustainable gardening practices". WSN has hosted events and activities such as pruning classes, pumpkin painting, food drives, and open houses. It has also partnered with City Fruit to host cider pressing events and has been a stop on the West Seattle Art Walk.

WSN participated in the Garden Centers of America's Summer Tour in 2018. The business has won the founders cup, a gold cup, and the grand prize at the Northwest Flower and Garden Festival.

== Reception ==
In 1992, Jerry Sedenko of The Seattle Times said WSN "has a few real treasures among the necessary basics".
