= Portland Nursery =

Garden center and plant nursery in Portland, Oregon, U.S.

- Logo

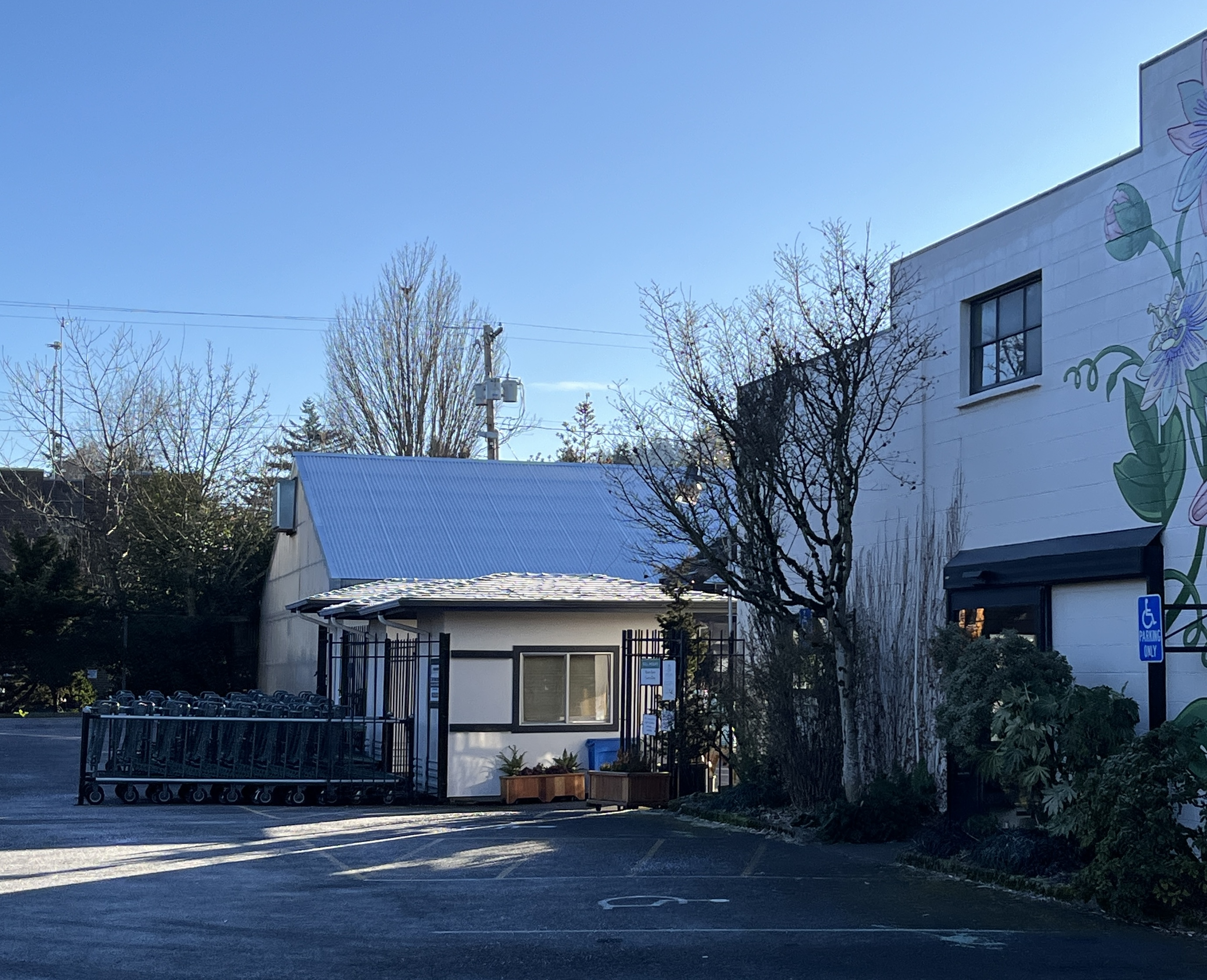
- Exterior of the Southeast Stark Street location in 2025
- Formerly: Portland Wholesale Nursery
- Founded: 1907; 119 years ago
- Founder: Albert Brownell
- Owner: Jon Denney
- Number of employees: 84 full-time, 5 part-time, 35 seasonal (2018)

Portland Nursery is an independent garden center and plant nursery based in Portland, Oregon, United States. Originally known as Portland Wholesale Nursery, the business was established by Albert Brownell in 1907.

== Description ==
The independent garden center and plant nursery Portland Nursery operates two locations in southeast Portland, on Division Street in the Powellhurst-Gilbert neighborhood and on Stark Street in the Mount Tabor neighborhood. It stocks indoor and outdoor plants, including houseplants and vegetable starts, as well as statuary, garden tools, and supplies for bonsai.

== History ==
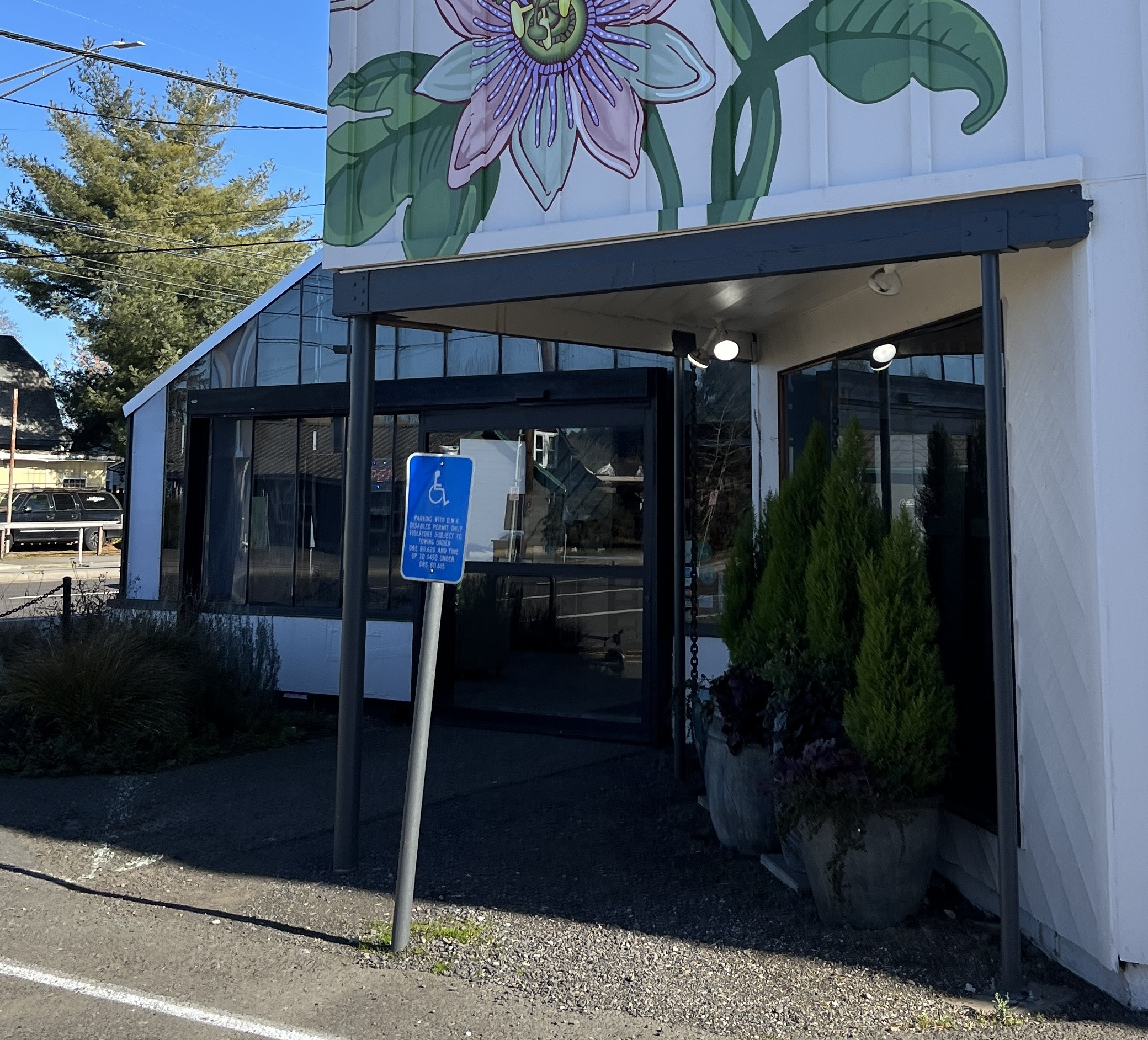
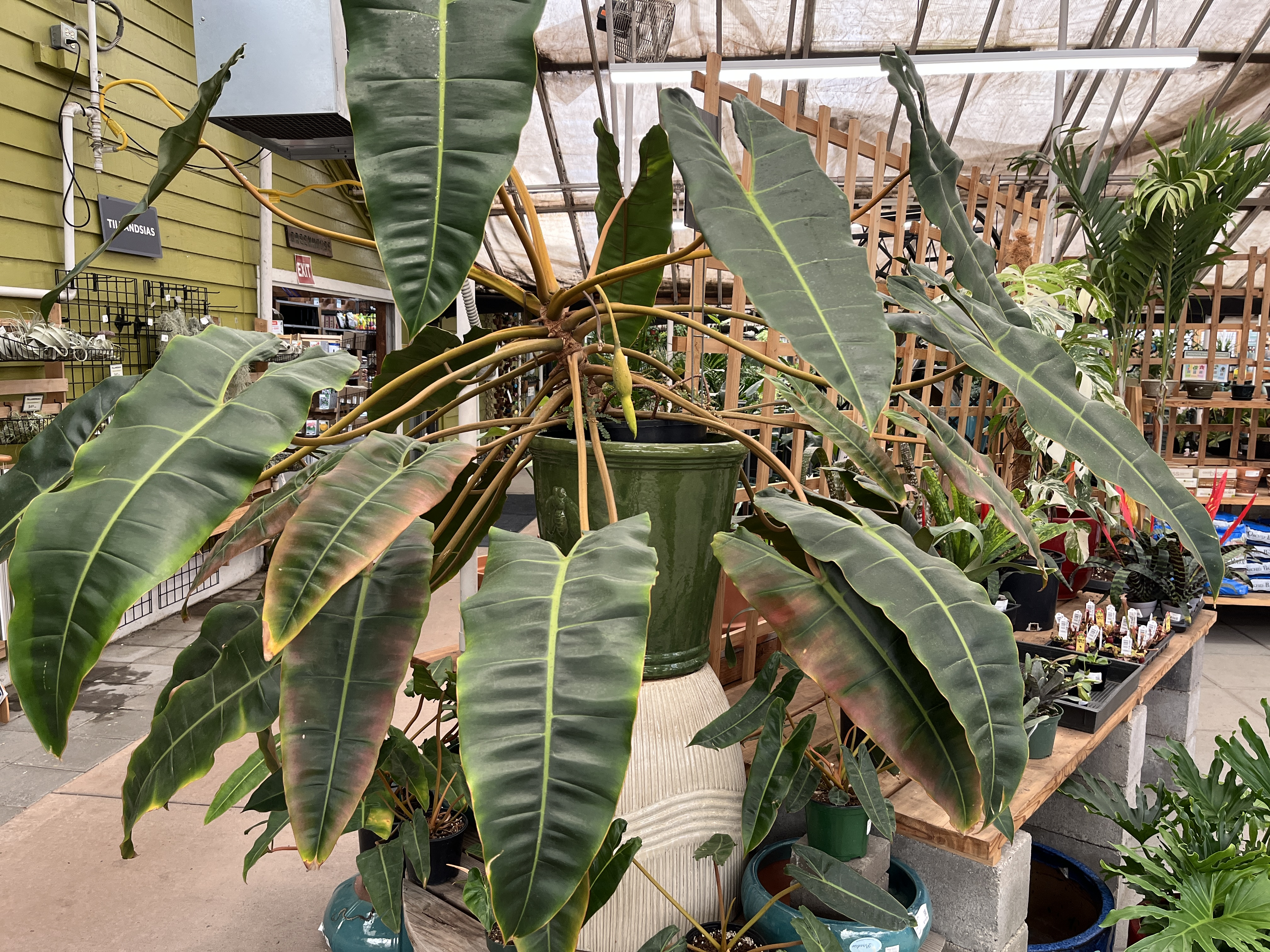
Exterior (top) and interior (bottom) of the Southeast Division Street location, 2025

Albert Brownell founded Portland Wholesale Nursery in 1907. Avery Steinmetz purchased the business in the early 1920s.

Jon Denney is the nursery's owner and president. He has owned the business since 1980. According to Garden Center, "In 2009, when many businesses were trying to save money in a tough economy by cutting back on advertising, Portland Nursery amped up theirs and changed the focus to play to consumers who were gardening themselves and wanted to have 'staycations' instead of hiring help. That boosted revenues by 9 percent that year." In 2018, the business had two locations and 84 full-time, 5 part-time, and 35 seasonal employees. Portland Nursery was considered an essential business during the COVID-19 pandemic.

The business has hosted the Apple Tasting Festival for more than 30 years. It has also hosted events and other activities such as an annual show by the Oregon Fuchsia Society and plant sales by the Greater Portland Iris Society and the Portland Orchid Society. Portland Nursery has collaborated with the Portland Rose Festival Foundation, and has supported local schools and nonprofit organizations via donations and sponsorships. The business is among retailers featured on the Portland edition of Monopoly. The board game was made available for sale at Portland Nursery.

== Reception ==
In 2021, The Oregonian said, "The packed parking lot just off Southeast Stark Street every weekend speaks to the popularity of this institution." Writers for Portland Monthly included Portland Nursery in a 2022 overview of the city's best plant nurseries and shops.

In 2025, Elinor Jones of the Portland Mercury included the business in an overview of the city's "best quiet places (when one needs to disassociate)", writing: "The neatly organized rows of plants and pots and small trees provide ample space to walk and enjoy greenery for an extended period of time without running the risk of getting lost on one of Mt. Tabor's lesser-used trails... In fact, I bet you could be super stoned at Portland Nursery and still find your way back out, no problem. There is no stress here."

The business ranked 26th in Garden Center's 2018 list of the top 100 independent garden centers. It ranked 23rd in the same list in 2024. Portland Nursery won in the Best Garden Supply/Nursery category of Willamette Week's annual 'Best of Portland' readers' poll in 2015, 2016, 2017, and 2018. It won in the same poll's Best Garden Supply/Nursery and Best Plant Shop categories in 2020, 2022, 2024, 2025, and 2026.

== See also ==
- List of companies based in Oregon
