= British Garden Centres =

British retail chain

Woodthorpe Hall Garden Centres Ltd.
- Logo since March 2022
- Industry: Garden centres
- Founded: 1990
- Headquarters: Alford, Lincolnshire, England, UK
- Owner: Stubbs family
- Website: britishgardencentres.com

British Garden Centres (legally incorporated as Woodthorpe Hall Garden Centres Ltd.), is a British chain of garden centres based in Alford, Lincolnshire, England. By 2022, it operated over sixty locations. It is the UK’s largest garden centre operator by number of sites.

== History ==
The company was started by Charles Stubbs in 1990 and remains owned by the Stubbs family. Its first garden centre was Woodthorpe Hall, built on a farm. In 2010, it acquired its fifth garden centre.

In 2018, the firm operated ten garden centres.

In 2019, the company acquired 37 garden centres from Wyevale Garden Centres. In December 2019, the firm completed its acquisition of Hillview, a chain of eight garden centres.

In March 2022, the company changed its logo, with the new design incorporating a red butterfly. The logo formerly had a poppy.
