= Garden Centers of America =

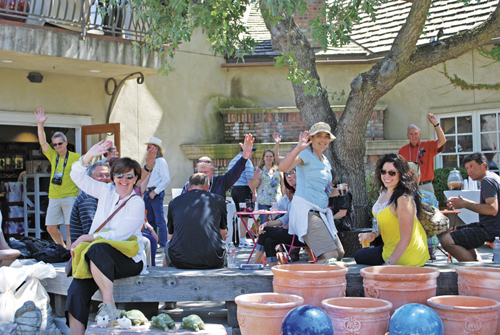
GCA Summer Tour-goers bring back retailing inspirations from touring indie garden centers in San Francisco, CA.

Garden Centers of America (GCA) was incorporated in March 1973 as a nonprofit organization of independent garden centers across North America for the purpose of improving conditions in the retail garden center industry. GCA provides a medium through which independent garden centers may consider their mutual problems and interests, exchange ideas and assist each other in bringing the independent garden center industry to a higher level of efficiency. Regular members are limited to independent retail firms to whose primary purpose is to sell live plants to the public. Active members must have a definite location of business with appropriate facilities to properly care for and display plants.

GCA puts on a summer tour of garden centers in different regions of the United States each year in June. Recent history has taken the tour to Nashville, TN; Seattle, WA; Norfolk/Virginia Beach, VA; Portland, OR; Milwaukee, WI; San Francisco, CA; central Ohio and Detroit, MI. GCA's commitment is to ensure the long-term success and sustainability of the locally owned independent garden center. GCA is the primary forum for information, education and training that promotes the exchange of ideas between member firms. In October 2016, GCA had 144 active member firms and 22 associate members with a sincere interest in improving the business of retailing in garden centers.

== Awards ==
Every year, GCA hosts the Best Garden Center Bathroom Awards recognizing independent garden centers with the best store restroom designs. A panel judges the entries based on the bathroom's creativity and comfort to the customer's overall shopping experience. The best entries are selected and given one of these honors: Gold Award, Silver Award and Merit Award. The winners are unveiled at the Independent Garden Center Show (IGC Show) in Chicago, Illinois, every year.

- 2019: (Gold) Monarch Landscaping & Garden Center, Auburn, IL; (Silver) Echter's Nursery & Garden Center, Arvada, CO; MRT Lawn & Garden Center, Venice, FL; (Merit) Prairie's Edge Garden Center, Bowling Green, MO
- 2018: (Gold) DeWayne's, Selma, NC; (Gold) Garden*Hood - Plant Atlanta, Atlanta, GA; (Gold) The Gardens at The Ridge, Kerrville, TX; (Silver) Hicks Nurseries, Westbury, NY; (Silver) Lurvey Garden Center, Des Plaines, IL; (Merit) Country Bumpkin Garden Center, Mundelein, IL; (Merit) Dammann's Garden Company, Indianapolis, IN; (Merit) Guilford Garden Center, Greensboro, NC; (Merit) Leaf & Petal, Birmingham, AL; (Merit) North River Greenhouse & Landscaping, Alamosa, CO; (Merit) Oakland Nursery, Columbus, OH; (Merit) Plumline Nursery, Murrysville, PA
- 2017: (Gold) Mesquite Valley Growers Nursery, Tucson, AZ; (Silver) Wingard's Market, Lexington, SC; (Merit) The Garden Mart, Mukwonago, WI; (Merit) Breezy Hill Nursery, Salem, WI
- 2016: (Gold) Fiddleheads Garden Center, Dalton, GA; (Gold) Larson's Garden Center, Burlington, CT; (Silver) Lammscapes/Lamm Gardens, Jackson, WI; (Silver) Van Atta's Greenhouse & Flower Shop, Haslett, MI; (Merit) Backbone Valley Nursery, Marble Falls, TX; (Merit) Dutch Mill Greenhouse, Marysville, OH; (Merit) Water Flow Productions, Purvis, MS
- 2015: (Gold) Altum's Horticultural Center & Landscape, Zionsville, IN; (Silver) Clay Garden and Gift, Santa Rosa Beach, FL; (Silver) Ebert's Greenhouse Village, Ixonia, WI; (Silver) Larson's Garden Center, Burlington, CT; (Merit) Cedar Brook Garden Center, New Prague, MN; (Merit) Fairfield Farms Nurseries, Oxford, FL; (Merit) Lammscapes/Lamm Gardens, Jackson, WI
- 2014: (Gold) The Garden Mart, Mukwonago, WI; (Silver) Cornell Farm, Portland, OR; (Silver) Flamingo Road Nursery, Davie, FL; (Silver) Lammscapes/Lamm Gardens, Jackson, WI; (Silver) Linton's Enchanted Gardens, Elkhart, IN; (Merit) Cedar River Garden Center, Palo, IA; (Merit) The Green Thumbers, Davenport, IA; (Merit) Tagawa Gardens, Centennial, CO
- 2013: (Gold) New Era Nursery, Hillsboro, WI; (Silver) Oakland Nursery, Delaware, OH; (Merit) Brent & Becky's Bulbs, Gloucester, VA; (Merit) Lammscapes/Lamm Gardens, Jackson, WI
- 2012: (Gold) Baker's Acres Greenhouse, Alexandria, OH; (Silver) Oakland Nursery, Delaware, OH; (Merit) Cedar Rim Nursery, Langley, BC, Canada; (Merit) Lammscapes/Lamm Gardens, Jackson, WI; (Merit) The Garden Place, Norway, MI; (Merit) Plants for All Seasons, Spring, TX; (Merit) GoodSeed Farm, Peebles, OH
- 2011: (Top Honors) Barton Grange Garden Centre, Preston, UK; (Gold) Sheridan Nurseries, Ontario, Canada; (Silver) Al's Garden Center, Silverwood, OR; (Silver) Chalet, Chicago, IL; (Silver) Linder's, St. Paul, MN; (Merit) The Barn Nursery, Chattanooga, TN; (Merit) Beaver Bark, Richland, WA; (Merit) Plantland Nursery, Veradale, WA

== GCA Summer Tours ==
Every June, GCA leads a bus tour for independent garden center owners, managers and staff, as well as supporting vendors, to go behind the scenes at leading independent garden retailers in one major metropolitan area in the United States. Hosted over three days, the tour's purpose is to help independent garden centers recharge their creative batteries, and foster connections between members of the industry.

- 2020: Boston, MA
  - Destinations announced soon
- 2019: Nashville, TN
  - Moore & Moore Garden Center, Nashville, TN
  - Gardens of Babylon, Nashville, TN
  - JVI Secret Gardens, Nashville, TN
  - Martin's Home & Garden, Murfreesboro, TN
  - Yarrow Acres, Franklin, TN
  - Optimara/Holtkamp Greenhouses, Inc., Nashville, TN
  - Bates Nursery & Garden Center, Nashville, TN
  - Creekside Garden Center & Landscaping, Nashville, TN
  - Hewitt Garden and Design Center, Franklin, TN
  - Long Hollow Gardens & Vineyards, Gallatin, TN
  - Johnny Cash Museum, Nashville, TN
  - American Pickers Star Mike Wolfe's Store, Antique Archaeology, in Marathon Village, Nashville, TN
- 2018: Seattle, WA
  - West Seattle Nursery & Garden Center, Seattle, WA
  - Watson's Greehouse & Nursery, Puyallup, WA
  - Windmill Gardens, Sumner, WA
  - Rainier View Winery & Nursery, Graham, WA
  - Branches Garden Center, Auburn, WA
  - Wells Medina Nursery, Medina, WA
  - Ravenna Gardens, Seattle, WA
  - Magnolia Garden Center, Seattle, WA
  - Pike Place Market, Seattle, WA
  - Swansons Nursery, Seattle, WA
  - Molbak's Garden + Home, Woodinville, WA
  - Sunnyside Nursery, Marysville, WA
  - McAuliffe's Valley Nursery, Snohomish, WA
  - Flower World, Inc., Snohomish, WA
  - Li'l Sprout Nursery & Garden Center, Mill Creek, WA
  - Sky Nursery, Shoreline, WA
- 2017: Virginia
  - American Revolution Museum, Yorktown, VA
  - Ken Matthews Garden Center, Yorktown, VA
  - Norfolk Botanical Garden, Norfolk, VA
  - Anderson's, Newport News, VA
  - McDonald Garden Market, Williamsburg-Monticello, VA
  - Sneed's Nursery & Garden Center, Richmond, VA
  - Cross Creek Nursery & Landscaping, Richmond, VA
  - The Great Big Greenhouse & Meadows Farms Nurseries, Richmond, VA
  - Colonial Williamsburg's Merchants Square, Williamsburg, VA
  - White's Nursery & Garden Center, Chesapeake, VA
  - McDonald Garden Center, Virginia Beach, VA
  - ViBe Creative District, Virginia Beach, VA
  - Atlantic Garden Center, Virginia Beach, VA
  - Anderson's, Virginia Beach, VA
- 2016: Portland, OR
  - Garden Fever, Portland, OR
  - Portland Nursery, Portland, OR
  - Al's Garden Center, Gresham, OR
  - Sester Farms, Gresham, OR
  - Tsugawa Nursery, Woodland, WA
  - Shorty's Garden & Home, Vancouver, WA
  - Gardener's Choice, Tigard, OR
  - Farmington Gardens, Beaverton, OR
  - Cornell Farms, Portland, OR
  - International Rose Test Garden, Portland, OR
  - Good News Gardening, Hood River, OR
  - McMenamins Edgefield, Troutdale, OR
  - Bauman's Farm & Garden, Gervais, OR
  - Al's Garden Center, Woodburn, OR
  - Monrovia, Dayton, OR
  - The Garden Corner, Tualatin, OR
  - Al's Garden Center, Sherwood, OR
- 2015: Milwaukee, WI
  - Boerner Botanical Gardens, Hales Corner, WI
  - Prospect Hill Garden Center, New Berlin, WI
  - K&W Greenery, Janesville, WI
  - Borzynski's Farm & Floral Market, Sturtevant, WI
  - Milaeger's, Racine, WI
  - Stein Garden & Home, Milwaukee, WI
  - The Milwaukee Domes, Milwaukee, WI
  - Caan's, Sheboygan, WI
  - Christopher Farm & Gardens, Sheboygan, WI
  - Johnson's Gardens, Cedarburg, WI
  - Stein Garden & Home, Wauwatosa, WI
  - Harley-Davidson Museum, Milwaukee, WI
  - Brennan's Market, Oconomowoc, WI
  - Oconomowoc Landscape Supply, Oconomowoc, WI
  - Ebert's Greenhouse Village, Ixonia, WI
  - Lammscapes/Lamm Gardens, Jackson, WI
  - Cabela's, Richfield, WI
  - Shady Lane Greenhouses, Menomonee Falls, WI
- 2014: San Francisco, CA
  - Annie's Annual's, Richmond, CA
  - Navlet's Garden Centers, Danville, CA
  - Orchard Nursery, Lafayette, CA
  - Armstrong Garden Centers, Dublin, CA
  - Alden Lane Nursery, Livermore, CA
  - Flora Grubb, San Francisco, CA
  - Bushnell Gardens, Granite Bay, CA
  - High Hand Nursery, Loomis, CA
  - Green Acres, Roseville, CA
  - Sloat Garden Center, Kentfield, CA
  - Computer History Museum, Mountain View, CA
  - Apple Headquarters, Cupertino, CA
  - Almaden Valley Nursery, San Jose, CA
  - SummerWinds Nursery, Cupertino, CA
  - Yamagami's Garden Center, Cupertino, CA
  - Wegman's Nursery, Redwood City, CA
- 2013: Ohio
  - Gale's Westlake Garden Center, Westlake, OH
  - Willoway Nurseries, Avon, OH
  - Petitti Garden Centers, Avon, OH
  - Casa Verde Growers, Columbia Station, OH
  - Green Circle Growers, Oberlin, OH
  - Berns Garden Center & Landscaping, Beavercreek, OH
  - Dorothy Lane Market, Springboro, OH
  - Grandma's Gardens, Waynesville, OH
  - Delhi Flower & Garden Center, Liberty Township, OH
  - Natorp's Nursery Outlet, Mason, OH
  - Baker's Acres Greenhouse, Alexandria, OH
  - Wilson's Garden Center, Newark, OH
  - Scotts Miracle-Gro Headquarters, Marysville, OH
  - A Proper Garden, Delaware, OH
  - Oakland Nurseries, Dublin, OH
- 2012: Detroit, MI
  - Bordine's, Grand Blanc, MI
  - Zingerman's, Ann Arbor, MI
  - Farmer John's Greenhouse, Farmington Hills, MI
  - Plymouth Nursery Home & Garden Showplace, Plymouth, MI
  - Four Star Greenhouse, Carleton, MI
  - English Gardens, Royal Oak, MI
  - Detroit Garden Works, Sylvan Lake, MI
  - Planterra Conservatory, West Bloomfield, MI
  - The Henry Ford Assembly Plant, Dearborn, MI
  - Greektown, Detroit, MI
  - Bordine's, Rochester Hills, MI
  - Ray Wiegand's Nursery & Garden Center, Macomb, MI
  - Deneweth's Garden Center, Macomb, MI
  - English Gardens, Clinton Township, MI

== History ==
From 1973 until 2002, GCA contracted with the American Association of Nurserymen (AAN) (later the American Nursery & Landscape Association, ANLA) to manage the affairs of the corporation. One part of that agreement required that potential members of GCA would be required to first be a member of the AAN.

In February 2002, the Board of ANLA voted to terminate the relationship since they were unable to come to an agreement with GCA on the future direction of that relationship.

In 2002, GCA contracted with Clayton W. Hannon (the retired executive director of the Oregon Association of Nurserymen, now the Oregon Association of Nurseries) to manage GCA on an interim basis.

In April 2005, management was moved to the Association Services Group (ASG) in LaGrange, Georgia.

GCA endorsed the Independent Garden Center Show and helped with its educational program. In April 2012, GCA ended its contract with ASG, unable to meet the financial obligations of its management contract, and signed an exclusive agreement with IGC Show founders to carry on GCA programs and activities under the IGC banner led by Jeff and Cheryl Morey, whose independent garden center dedicated entities include the IGC Show.
