= Help a Reporter Out =

Online service

Help a Reporter Out (HARO) is an online service for journalists to obtain feedback from the public. It enables journalists to connect with experts in issues relevant to their reporting.

== History ==
HARO was founded as a Facebook group in 2008 by Peter Shankman and was later turned into a mailing list claiming over 800,000 sources and 55,000 journalists and bloggers. In June 2010, HARO was acquired by Vocus, Inc. In 2014, Vocus merged with Cision Inc. and HARO was one of Cision's brands until it was retired in 2024.

The service previously known as HARO continued on through most of 2024 under Cision's Connectively brand. On November 8, 2024, Cision emailed users "that as of December 9, 2024, the Connectively platform – formerly known as HARO - will be permanently discontinued. ... This decision has been made so that we can concentrate our efforts on enhancing our core offering, CisionOne, where we see significant opportunities to accelerate innovation and deliver more impactful tools for PR and communications professionals."

On April 15, 2025, Cision announced that it was selling the HARO platform to Featured.com. On April 16, Featured announced that it was reviving the HARO service, with backing by a group of investors, including Great North Ventures . In an email to former users that same day, Featured.com indicated that HARO's website had been relaunched and that users would start receiving emails on April 22, 2025.
