= Dobbies Garden Centres =

British gardening company

Dobbies Garden Centres Limited
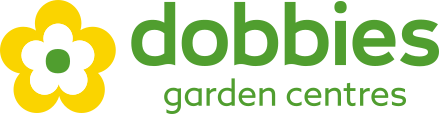
- Formerly: Dobbie & Co. Limited (1920–1997); Dobbies Garden Centres plc (1997–2011)
- Type: Private
- Industry: Gardening
- Founded: 1865
- Founder: James Dobbie
- Headquarters: Lasswade, Scotland, UK
- Area served: United Kingdom
- Key people: David Robinson (CEO)
- Owners: Ares Management
- Number of employees: 950
- Website: dobbies.com

Dobbies Garden Centres Limited (styled as dobbies) is a British chain of garden centres based in Lasswade, Scotland. It was formerly the biggest garden centre operator in the United Kingdom, for a time, operating as many as 77 stores, some of which it acquired from the previous biggest garden centre chain, Wyevale.

== History ==
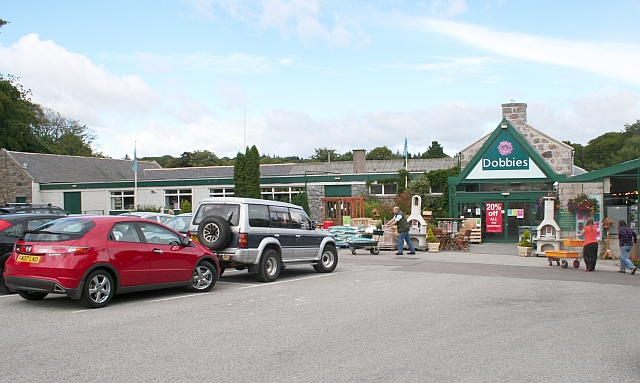
Dobbies Garden Centre, Aberdeen

The business was founded in 1865 by James Dobbie, who created a seeds business named Dobbie & Co. in Renfrew, Scotland. After being awarded the Royal Warrant for Gardeners and Nurserymen to the Royal Household, the company expanded into a seed catalogue business, where it built up a customer base of 50,000 over the following century.

In 1969 the company expanded out of its Scottish base into England, and was floated on AIM in 1987. Up until 1984 Dobbies continued to operate principally as a seed merchant. It was then bought out by David Barnes, managing director of Waterers. Between 1984 and 1989 Dobbies opened five new garden centres in Scotland.

The company was floated on the Stock Exchange in 1997 and this led to Dobbies expanding their garden centre operations further South into England.

=== Acquisition by Tesco ===
Tesco announced its intention to purchase Dobbies Garden Centres for £155.6 million on 8 June 2007. The deal was confirmed as successful by the board of directors of Tesco on 17 August 2007 when the board announced that they had received 53.1% of shares (or 5,410,457 shares), which confirmed conditions set out in the offer made on 20 June 2007. Although the deal had been confirmed by Tesco the offer remained open to Dobbies shareholders until 20 August 2007.

Tesco raised its holding to 65% in September that year, although Sir Tom Hunter took the company to court in May 2008 in an attempt to avoid further shares in Dobbies being issued, as it would reduce his holding. The legal challenge was unsuccessful, and on 5 June 2008 Tesco announced that it would be compulsorily acquiring the remainder of the shares in Dobbies Garden Centres PLC.

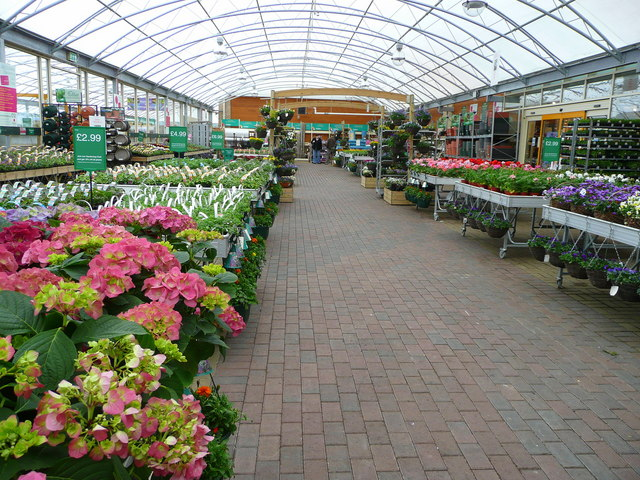
Example of covered plant area

On 10 May 2009, Dobbies announced it had made £1 million sales of its Grow Your Own range in that year to date. Grow Your Own allows many of Dobbies' 10 million-strong customer base to grow salad, vegetables and fruits from home with more than 100,000 tomato plants sold in the previous two months alone. For the year to early 2009, turnover was £97 million.

In 2010, Dobbies opened their first outlet in Northern Ireland, and the store, near Lisburn, opened in September 2010.

=== Sell off from Tesco ===
On 17 June 2016, Tesco sold the company on to a group of investors led by Midlothian Capital Partners and Hattington Capital for £217m.

=== Recent years ===
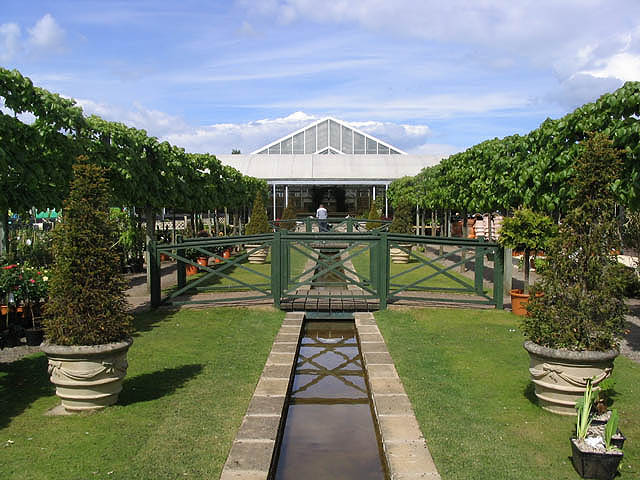
Dobbies Garden Centre, Lasswade

Dobbies now operates 57 garden centres and restaurants across the UK.

In May 2019, Dobbies bought 37 stores from Wyevale Garden Centres, doubling its reach and for a period was the biggest garden centre chain in the UK by both number of stores and turnover.

In February 2020, Dobbies closed its Dalgety Bay Store in Fife, stating its small size and proximity to a larger store in Dunfermline as reasons for the decision.

Dobbies announced in June 2020 that it would open a flagship store near Tewkesbury at the planned Designer Village Cotswold. The store opened in 2022 and will become the largest Dobbies store in the South West and the fourth largest Dobbies store in the UK.

Following its temporary closure during the COVID-19 pandemic, Dobbies announced a partnership with Sainsbury's to supply its food halls with Sainsbury's branded products. The range will contain over 3,000 products including chilled, frozen, ambient and household products. Dobbies' Edinburgh store was the first to offer the full range at the end of July with other stores following throughout 2020. However, in 2022 certain stores trialled a Waitrose branded food hall. In October 2023, the company opened their largest store in Antrim in Northern Ireland, costing over £10 million to construct.

In October 2024, the chain announced the closure of 17 centres across the UK, with anticipated job losses of 465 staff in an attempt by the new owners to reduce rents and return the company to profitability.

== See also ==
- Wyevale Garden Centres
