= Wyevale Garden Centres =

Former UK chain of garden centres

- Industry: Garden centres
- Founded: 1967
- Founder: The Williamson Family
- Defunct: 2019
- Headquarters: United Kingdom
- Owner: Terra Firma Capital Partners (defunct trademarks)

Wyevale Garden Centres was a British garden centre chain, founded in 1967 by the Williamson Family.

The chain became the UK's largest garden centre operator in the 1990s, and purchased the Country Gardens chain in September 2000. In February 2007, it purchased the Blooms of Bressingham chain.

In July 2009, the chain rebranded as The Garden Centre Group. In March 2012, Terra Firma Capital Partners purchased the group, who renamed it back to Wyevale in October 2014.

In May 2018, Terra Firma Capital Partners announced they would seek to offload Wyevale's estate of 145 properties. The biggest purchasers of the Wyevale estate were Dobbies Garden Centres and British Garden Centres, who both each bought 37 centres, as well as Blue Diamond Garden Centres who bought 16 centres. 50 centres were sold to smaller chains and independents, and five were closed. The sale process was completed by September 2019.

== History ==
The company started as a mail-order nursery operated by the Williamson family in the 1930s in Hereford and in 1967 opened the first Wyevale Garden Centre on Kings Acre Road. It became a public limited company (PLC) in 1987, and was listed on the London Stock Exchange.

In the 1990s, the chain purchased the Kennedy's Garden Centres, and Cramphorn Garden Centre chains and transformed all outlets into Wyevale.

In 2000, Wyevale purchased Country Gardens in what has been considered by some to be a "hostile takeover".

In 2007, Blooms of Bressingham was purchased by Wyevale, Blooms had previously acquired the Jardiniere Garden Centre chain.

In February 2009, following the collapse of the Icelandic investment company Baugur Group who had a large stake in the firm, the Bank of Scotland became the majority owner of the firm in a debt-for-equity deal. In 2009, the name was changed to The Garden Centre Group.

The company was bought by private equity firm Terra Firma in March 2012.

On 17 July 2014, the company announced it would be rebranding to Wyevale Garden Centres.

In May 2018, the company announced that its investors (Terra Firma) had decided to put it up for sale as a complete business or for its individual garden centres.

On 16 August 2018, Wyevale sold eight of its largest garden centres to Blue Diamond Garden Centres, including Bicester, Oxfordshire; Endsleigh, Devon; Sanders, Burnham-on-sea; Cadbury, Bristol; Cardiff, Wales; Percy Thrower, Shrewsbury; Melbicks, Birmingham; and Weybridge, Surrey.

On 30 August 2018, Wyevale announced the sale of five garden centres to individual buyers, including Nailsworth Garden Centre which was sold to Blue Diamond Garden Centres. A further four centres were sold to individual buyers on 4 September 2018 Dobbies Garden Centres, headquartered in Scotland, agreed to purchase a portfolio of five Wyevale Garden Centres sites in England on 8 October.

On 21 May 2019, Wyevale announced the sale of two garden centres to Blackbrooks Garden Centres. The sale consisted of their Lower Dicker & Hastings stores. In the same month, Dobbies purchased 37 Wyevale locations, doubling their reach and becoming the largest garden centre company in the UK.

On 10 September 2019, the business announced the sale of its remaining centres to British Garden Centres, leading to the closure of the historic Wyevale Garden Centres brand.

Following Wyevale’s financial difficulties, Dobbies Garden Centres acquired the vast majority of Wyevale locations in 2018. Any remaining locations were sold to Blue Diamond Garden Centres, independent owners and smaller chains, with the final outlets sold and converted to British Garden Centres in 2019.

In September 2023, the final holding company of Wyevale was dissolved after entering liquidation in 2020, with no entity acquiring the Wyevale brand or intellectual property, remaining property of Terra Firma.

== See also ==
- Dobbies Garden Centres
