= Peter Shankman =

American entrepreneur and author (born 1972)

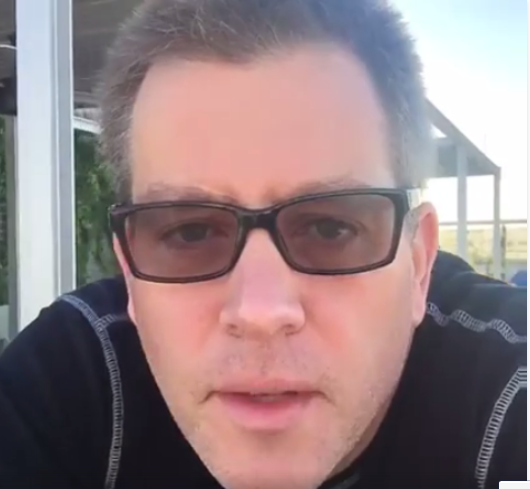
- Born: August 6, 1972 (age 54); New York City, US
- Education: Fiorello LaGuardia High School of Performing Arts
- Alma mater: Boston University
- Occupations: Author, entrepreneur
- Website: shankman.com

Peter Shankman (born August 6, 1972) is an American entrepreneur and author. He is best known for founding HARO; an online service for journalists to gather feedback from the public.

== Early life ==
Peter Shankman was born in New York City. He attended Fiorello H. LaGuardia High School of Performing Arts, and then Boston University. He was an only child and both his parents were music professors at New York University.

== Career ==
Peter Shankman started his career at America Online as a Senior News Editor. He helped to found the AOL Newsroom and spearheaded coverage of the Democratic and Republican 1996 conventions. He then started a PR firm called The Geek Factory.

He was the creator of Help a Reporter Out ("HARO"), a service for journalists which was acquired by Vocus, Inc. in 2010. He remained at Vocus until 2012.

He has been a guest speaker at TedX, South by Southwest, Affiliate Summit, BlogWorld Los Angeles and New York, the Direct Marketing Association.

Shankman is also an angel investor. His investments include Daily Worth, Namely, Pixability, Right Next Door, and Simplist.

He has written four books on marketing and customer service.

== Advisory roles ==
He sits on the advisory boards of several companies, including DailyWorth, Scottevest and Namely. He also holds a seat on the NASA Education and Outreach Council. The committee was established, and members appointed by, NASA Administrator Charles Bolden. He is also occasionally quoted in an advisory role on social media and in other marketing outlets.

== Personal life ==
Shankman lives in New York City and has one daughter.

He regularly talks about his experience with ADHD, while delivering marketing-related lectures and talks about channeling it, for one's own benefits.

== Books ==
Faster Than Normal: Turbocharge Your Focus, Productivity, and Success with the Secrets of the ADHD Brain. TarcherPerigee. 2017. ISBN 978-0-14-313122-9.
Zombie Loyalists: Using Great Service to Create Rabid Fans. St. Martin's Press. 2015. ISBN 978-1-137-27966-8.
Nice Companies Finish First: Why Cutthroat Management is over and Collaboration is In. Palgrave-MacMillan. 2013. ISBN 978-1-137-279156.
Customer Service: New Rules for a Social-Enabled World. Que/Pearson,. 2004. ISBN 978-0-7897-4709-9.
Can We Do That!: Outrageous PR Stunts That Work. Wiley and Sons. 2006. ISBN 978-0-470-04392-9.
