= QD (retailer) =

British discount retailer and garden centre chain operator

QD Stores Limited
- Type: Private limited company
- Industry: Retail
- Founded: 1985; 41 years ago; Norwich, United Kingdom
- Headquarters: Nottingham, United Kingdom
- Number of locations: 30 (2022)
- Products: Groceries; Consumer goods; Garden and leisure; Pet supplies; Stationery; Toiletries; DIY
- Owner: Danny Rubins; David Rubins
- Website: www.qdstores.co.uk

QD Stores Limited (trading as Quality Discounts and QD) is a British independently-owned discount retailer operating in the United Kingdom, primarily in East Anglia and the East Midlands regions. Products stocked include a mixture of items for the home and garden, basic groceries and a range of clothing and footwear. The company also run Cherry Lane Garden Centres.

== History ==
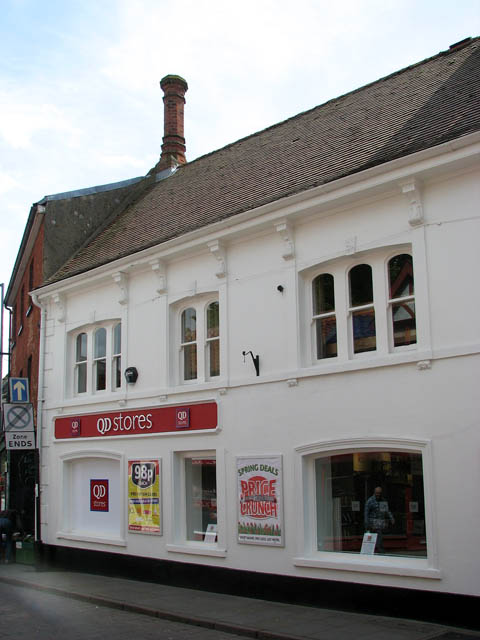
Store in North Walsham

The first QD Stores branch was opened in Norwich in 1985, with the initials QD standing for quality discounts.

During the 1990s QD Stores purchased the small department store Lathams of Potter Heigham, which it still operates under the original name. It also established Cherry Lane Garden Centres in 2001, which by 2008 had become the eighth biggest UK gardening centre group.

The number of QD Stores locations has grown relatively slowly since 1985. Notable changes to the store estate include the opening of eight new stores in former Woolworths locations following that company's closure in 2009. However the group completed the closure of their flagship store in St Stephens Street, Norwich in late 2012.

In 2010, the company opened its first store outside England in Wrexham, north Wales. Housed in a former Marks & Spencer branch, the store traded for ten years before declining local trade led to closure plans being announced in 2020. In 2011, the company moved its headquarters from Anglia Square in Norwich to the former Norfolk Chamber of Commerce site on the corner of Barrack Street and Silver Road.

The company added 11 more shops to their portfolio through the purchase of fellow East Anglian discounter Thingmebobs in early 2013. These stores retained their separate identity and a new parent company, QD Commercial Group Holdings, was set up to operate the various related companies. The Thingmebobs Stores were re-branded under QD in 2022.

QD Stores established an e-commerce site selling goods online during 2014 and followed this with the introduction of a 'click and collect' service the following year. The company announced in April 2022 that it would be joining fellow discounters Poundland and Home Bargains in offering a frozen food section. In August 2022, QD opened their 30th store in Maldon, Essex.

== Cherry Lane Garden Centres ==
Cherry Lane Garden Centre group was started by QD in 2001 to run three garden centres based in East Anglia. The company runs five nurseries to grow their own plants.

The Cherry Lane Garden Centre group has continued to grow with the purchase of Retford & Gainsborough Garden Centre in Nottinghamshire in February 2022, their 16th garden centre across East Anglia, East Midlands and Yorkshire.
