= IGC (file format) =

An IGC file (.igc extension) is a text file format used in flight recorders especially in gliders but also in paragliders in order to certify a performance (circuit performed as planned, altitude gain, duration of a flight, etc.). This format allows in particular the recording of the position (determined via the satellite navigation), the recording of the evolution of the altitude (measured by GPS or by barometric sensor) but also of additional information such as the possible ignition of an engine.

Specification for this file format is published by the International Gliding Commission of the International Aeronautical Federation.

These files can be created using specialized equipment called FAI recorder or FAI logger (Volkslogger, LXNAV Nano among others) or using certain anti-collision devices (FLARM) or using a dedicated application that can run on smartphone (XCSoar, LK8000, SeeYou Mobile ...).

IGC files can optionally be digitally signed using public key cryptography, so that an IGC file can be verified as being created on a certain flight computer. IGC files generated on smartphones or other multipurpose hardware will not be signed.

These files can be viewed (GPS track and altitude in particular) using software running in the form of rich client (GPXSee for example ) or web application. Some smartphone applications also allow you to view these files (IGC Viewer & Browser on Android for example). There are also tools to convert IGC files to tracks in GPX or KML with extension gx:Track format. They allow you to view the track made (but lose a lot of information present in the original IGC file such as the circuit declaration).

== See also ==
- GPX file format
- KML (Keyhole Markup Language) with extension gx:Track file format
- CSV file format

== Notes and references ==
- "IGC-approved Flight Recorders | World Air Sports Federation". www.fai.org.
- "Technical specification for IGC-approved GNSS flight recorders" (PDF). Archived from the original (PDF) on 2021-03-07.
