= Bob Phibbs (retail consultant) =

American retail consultant and author

- Other name: The Retail Doctor
- Occupations: Retail consultant, author
- Notable work: The Retail Doctor's Guide to Growing Your Business (2010)

Bob Phibbs is an American retail consultant and author known as "The Retail Doctor". Earlier in his career he was a choral conductor in Long Beach, California, where he founded the South Coast Chorale.

== Career ==
=== Retail ===
Phibbs founded the retail consulting firm The Retail Doctor in 1994 and is known professionally as the Retail Doctor. He advises brick-and-mortar retailers on selling and customer experience. He is a frequent commentator on retail for business, trade, and consumer publications.

=== Music ===
Before his retail work, Phibbs was active in choral music in Long Beach. He was the director of the Long Beach Gay Men's Chorus and in 1990 founded the South Coast Chorale, which became the oldest resident company of the Carpenter Performing Arts Center at California State University, Long Beach. The Chorale described itself as an artistic voice of Long Beach's lesbian and gay community.

In January 1989, Phibbs served as the spokesman for a group of Long Beach gay arts organizations that publicly declined a $1,500 donation offered by Ozzy Osbourne as an apology for a remark made during a New Year's Eve concert at the Long Beach Arena, calling the amount inadequate.

Under Phibbs, the South Coast Chorale presented original and themed programs at the Carpenter Center. In May 1997 it premiered Out!, a performance of songs and monologues drawn from the chorale members' coming-out experiences with music Phibbs composed with Steven Landau. Los Angeles Times critic Don Heckman reviewed the premiere. The Chorale also presented the annual remembrance concert, Hope: A Time for Remembrance, which honors people lost to AIDS and breast cancer. In 2003 he co-produced a stage adaptation of Janell Cannon's children's book Stellaluna with students from a Long Beach elementary school.

== Book ==
- Phibbs, Bob; The Retail Doctor's Guide to Growing Your Business; May 3, 2010; John Wiley & Sons, pp 272; ISBN 9780470587171, 0470587172.
