= Garden centre =

Retailer of plants and related products

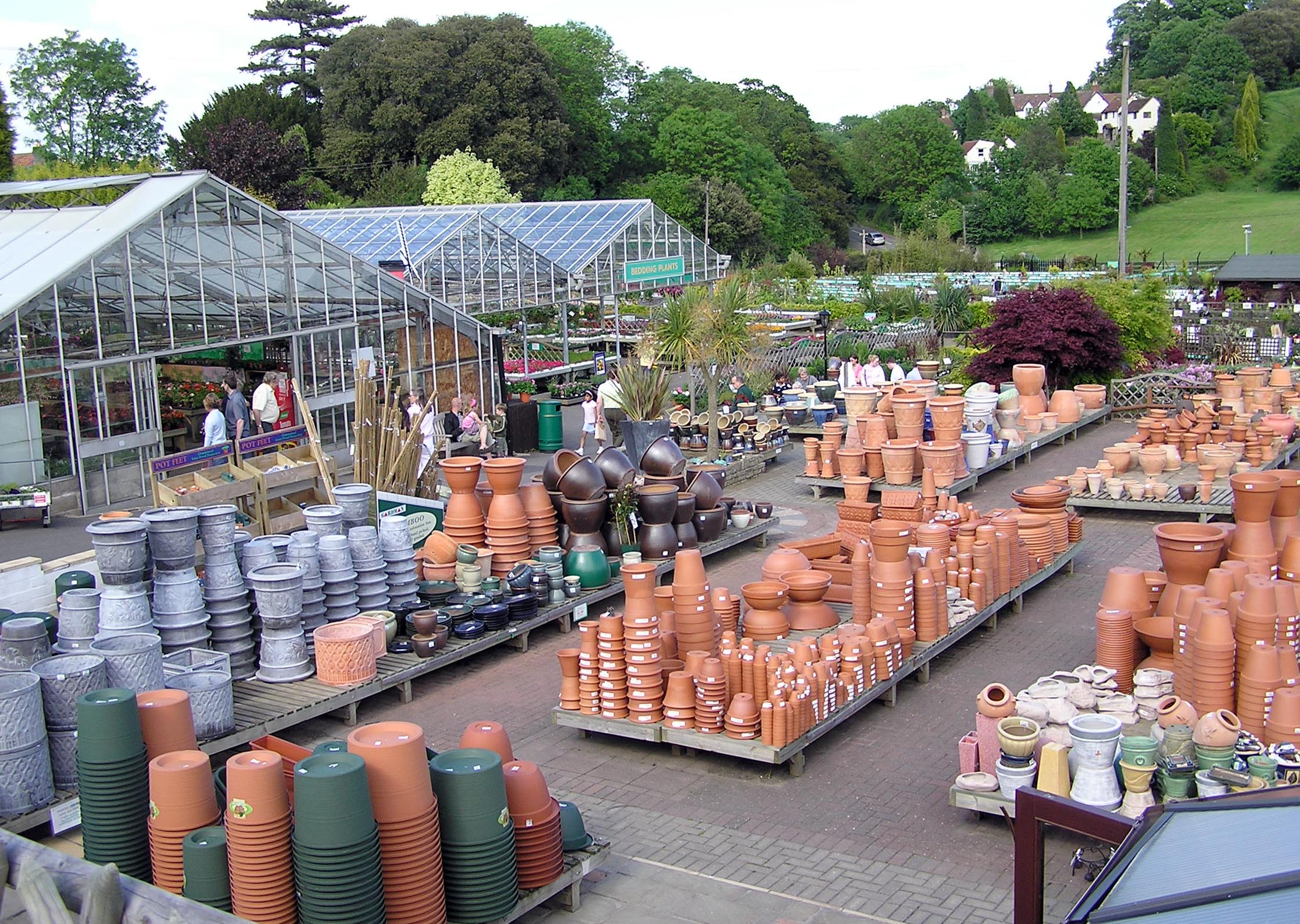
Part of a large garden centre near Bristol, England

A garden centre (Commonwealth English spelling; U.S. nursery or garden center) is a retail business that primarily sells plants and related products for domestic gardening. Gardening centres usually revolve around outdoor home improvement and décor, selling anything from plants to outdoor ordainments.

It evolved from the concept of a retail plant nursery, offering a broader range of outdoor products and additional on-site facilities.

Today, garden centres typically source their plants from specialist nurseries rather than propagating them on-site. In addition to plants, garden centres may offer a variety of other products and services, including homeware, gifts, and cafes.

== Europe ==
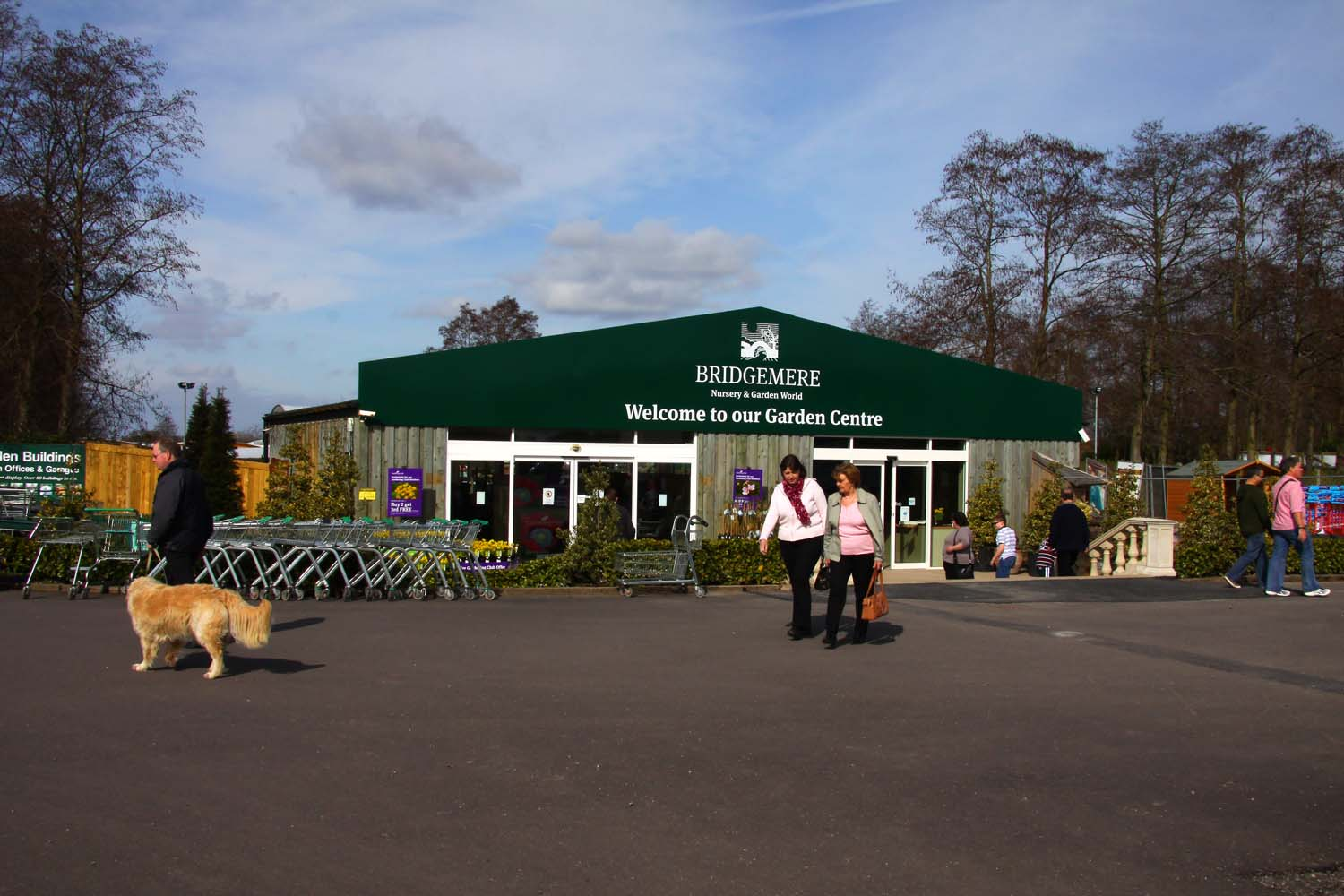
Entrance to Bridgemere Garden World

Garden centres across Europe play a significant role in supporting the region's horticultural interests, catering to both amateur gardeners and professional landscapers. These centres typically offer a diverse range of plants, gardening tools, outdoor furniture, and decorative items, as well as expert advice and workshops. With a unique blend of local traditions and modern retail practices, garden centres vary widely across the continent, reflecting the environmental and cultural diversity of the region.

=== United Kingdom ===
The United Kingdom has a large and diverse garden centre industry. There are over 1,500 garden centres in the UK, ranging from small, independent businesses to large, national chains. The industry is worth an estimated £6.5 billion per year.

The most popular products sold at garden centres include plants, compost, fertilisers, tools, and landscaping materials. Many garden centres also sell pet-related products, home and interior products, and food and drink.

Garden centres are an important part of the British economy. They provide jobs for over 100,000 people and generate billions of pounds in revenue each year. They also play a role in promoting gardening and outdoor living in the UK.

==== History of garden centres in the UK ====
The first garden centre in the UK was opened by Edward Stewart in 1955 at Ferndown, Dorset, at his family's plant nursery. He opened a second, purpose-built one called Garden Lands in 1961 at nearby Christchurch. This led to a succession of other nurseries converting to garden centres. In the early days, garden centres were primarily focused on selling plants and gardening supplies. However, over time, they began to offer a wider range of products and services. Their increase in numbers was due to a number of factors, including the rise of the middle class, the increasing popularity of gardening, and the development of new technologies that made it easier to grow plants in volume. This growth also coincided with the development of new shopping centres and the rise of national garden centre chains.

In addition to their product range, garden centres have also evolved in terms of their customer experience. In the past, garden centres were often seen as a place to buy plants and gardening supplies. However, today, they are more of a leisure destination. Many garden centres have cafés, restaurants, play areas, and other amenities that make them a popular destination for families and couples. They also sell pet supplies, home and garden products, food and drink, and even clothing.

The rise of national chains has been a major factor in the evolution of garden centres in the UK. National chains have been able to achieve economies of scale, which has allowed them to offer lower prices and a wider range of products. This has put pressure on independent garden centres.

===== Notable chains (UK) =====
The largest UK garden centre chains include:

UK garden centre chains
	No. of sites	2025 turnover	2024 turnover	2023 turnover	2022 turnover	2021 turnover	2020 turnover	2019 turnover	2018 turnover	2017 turnover
Dobbies	52	£257m	£271m	£279m	£279m	£304m	£252m	£166m	£148m	£151m
British Garden Centres	80	£233m	£172m	£162m	£161m	£162m	£125m	£49m	£32m	£29m
Blue Diamond	55	£395m	£332m	£311m	£259m	£255m	£210m	£182m	£128m	£96m
Notcutts	19	£81m	£79m	£74m	£76m	£80m	£64m	£76m	£75m	£71m
Squire's	17	£73m	£67m	£68m	£68m	£70m	£53m	£57m	£50m	£47m
Klondyke	23	£88m	£78m	£74m	£68m	£65m	£53m	£57m	£53m	£54m
QD / Cherry Lane	19		£65m	£65m	£68m	£49m	£49m	£43m	£39m	£35m
Longacres	6	£62m	£61m	£57m	£51m	£52m	£40m	£37m	£36m	£32m
Hillier Nurseries	23	£76m	£73m	£69m	£55m	£51m	£38m	£37m	£33m	£23m
Haskins	5		£44m	£45m	£44m	£51m	£38m	£31m	£32m	£32m
Bents	1	£30m	£27m	£25m	£25m	£25m	£18m	£23m	£22m	£21m
Tates	4	£35m	£34m	£33m	£32m	£30m	£23m	£24m	£18m	£8m
Otter	8	£38m	£34m	£33m	£32m	£33m	£26m	£26m	£21m	£20m
Wyevale	0	£0m	£0m	£0m	£0m	£0m	£0m	£0m	£336m	£322m
Yorkshire	7	£27m	£25m	£23m	£15m					

Home improvement retailer B&Q, as well as variety retailers B&M, Home Bargains and The Range have their own garden departments, alongside the main store buildings.

=== Western Europe ===
In France, garden centres, often referred to as jardineries, are commonly integrated with large agricultural cooperatives. Companies like Truffaut and Jardiland dominate the market, offering extensive selections of plants, garden supplies, and home decor. French garden centres are also known for their focus on organic products and biodiversity, reflecting the country's emphasis on sustainability.

Garden centres in Belgium and the Netherlands reflect the region's established horticultural sector. In the Netherlands, some centres incorporate greenhouse technology and hydroponics, while also selling ornamental plants, bulbs, and seeds. Retail chains such as Intratuin and GroenRijk operate garden centre locations in the Dutch market.

=== Southern Europe ===
In Italy and Spain, garden centres often showcase plants and materials suited to Mediterranean climates, such as olive trees, citrus plants, and drought-tolerant flora. Italian garden centres, like Viridea, often combine traditional plant sales with boutique experiences, featuring cafes and cooking classes using home-grown herbs. Meanwhile, Spanish centres, such as Verdecora, emphasise outdoor living trends, including terracotta pottery and furnishings suited to warm climates.

In Portugal, garden centres are smaller in scale but serve as key suppliers of native plants like cork oak and succulents. They often cater to both locals and tourists looking to create sustainable gardens in coastal and arid regions.

=== Northern Europe ===
Garden centres in Germany and Scandinavia focus heavily on functionality and sustainability. German retailers such as Dehner lead the industry, offering everything from garden equipment to landscaping services, often in collaboration with environmental organisations. Scandinavian garden centres, reflecting their climate, specialise in cold-hardy plants, indoor gardening solutions, and minimalist outdoor décor.

=== Central and Eastern Europe ===
In Poland, Hungary, and other parts of Central Europe, garden centres are increasingly modernising, with companies like Ogrodnik and OBI expanding their operations. These centres often highlight regional plants and seasonal flowers, catering to the area's strong gardening culture. In Russia, large-scale centres near metropolitan areas focus on ornamental gardening, offering exotic plants alongside traditional varieties.

In the Balkans, smaller garden centres typically act as community hubs, offering locally-grown plants and tailored advice. However, countries like Croatia and Serbia are seeing a rise in larger chains as urban populations grow interested in gardening as a leisure activity.

== United States ==
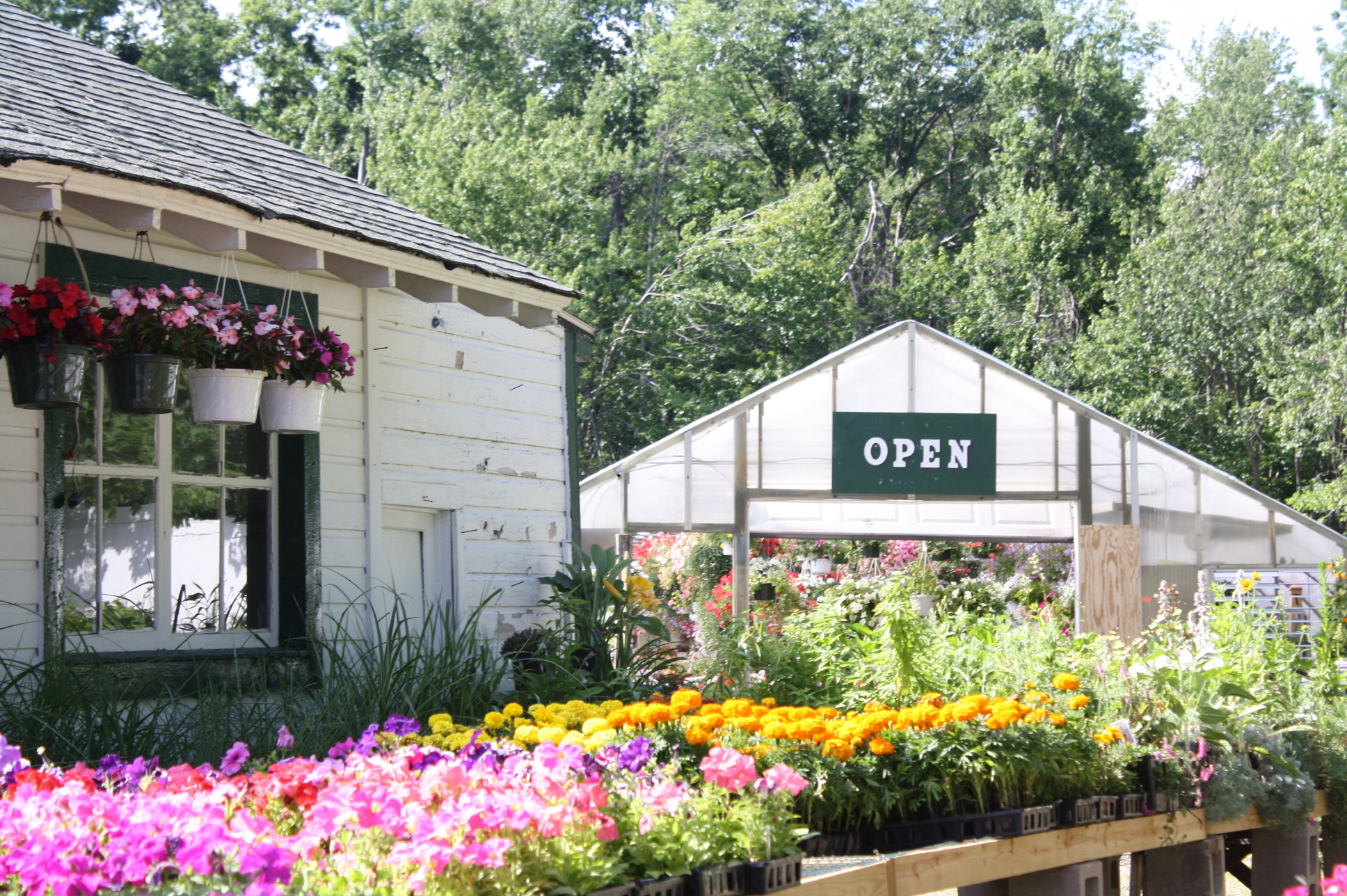
Howe's Farm and Garden in Paxton, Massachusetts

=== History ===
In 1737, Robert Prince opened the Linnean Botanic Garden in Flushing, Queens, New York, which was one of the first commercial nurseries in what would become the United States. In the 1870s, lawn ornaments became popular features, with decorations such as bird baths and gazebos being particularly popular. With the urban sprawl in the United States after WW2, Americans became more able to spend their money on home improvement and outdoor décor. The increasing popularity of yards and front yards as more Americans moved to newly developed suburban areas strengthened growth for garden centres. Having a large, well-maintained lawn began to be seen as a core part of the American Dream, causing the importance of garden centres to increase.

=== Modern Day ===
The United States retail garden centre market contained roughly 16,000 independently operated companies in 2010, according to Research and Markets. The combined annual revenue for all of them is about $46.2 billion. Most garden centres are independently owned. There are some regional chains, but there is no national US garden centre chain, unlike in the UK, where there are several. However, both of the largest home improvement stores in the US—Lowe's and The Home Depot—refer to their gardening departments as garden centre and larger hardware stores have "Lawn and Garden" departments.

Some of the items that can be found in US garden centres often called nurseries, include annual and perennial flowers, trees and shrubs, roses, container gardens, hanging baskets, houseplants, water gardening, seeds and bulbs, potting mixes, soil amendments and mulch, fertilisers and chemicals, pottery, garden tools and supplies, fountains and garden décor, much like their UK counterparts.

Many US garden centres have other departments including wild bird feeding, floral, gift, outdoor furniture and barbecue grills, home décor, landscape design, landscaping services, and pet supplies. Most garden centres have a large Christmas department during the holiday season. Some garden centres have added a café or coffee bar, but not like the restaurants found in some European garden centres.

Greenhouses are commonly part of a US garden centre. Greenhouses protect the plants from late cold snaps, allow stores to keep houseplants in prime condition, and keep the customers dry on rainy days.

Garden centres employ horticulturists who can diagnose problems and make recommendations to gardeners. This is almost always provided as a free service in the store and some of the bigger garden centres have classes that are open to the public.

Many garden centres belong to a buying cooperative. The largest is Master Nursery Garden Centers with just under 800 members followed by Home and Garden Showplace (part of the larger cooperative the True Value Company) with 260 members, Northwest Nursery Buyers Association with 46 members and finally, ECGC with 14 very large garden centre members.

The trade associations of independent garden centres in the US are the Garden Centers of America and the American Nursery & Landscape Association.

=== Chains (US) ===
	No. Of Sites	2023 Turnover
Armstrong Garden Centers & Pike Nurseries	48	$212m
Petitti Garden Centers	9	$104m
Meadows Farms Nurseries	17	$74m
Mahoney's Garden Centers	7	$50m
Green Thumb Nursery	5	$49m
Oakland Nurseries	4	$44m
Stauffers of Kissel Hill	7	$40m
Earl May Garden Centres	28	$39m
Summerwinds Nursery	8	$35m
Sloan Garden Center	12	$32m

== Trends ==
Many European garden centres emphasise eco-friendly products, native plant species, and biodiversity, in line with European Union policies promoting green practices.

As urban populations increase, centres have begun catering to city dwellers with solutions for balcony and rooftop gardens.

A shift toward providing experiences—such as workshops, cafes, and community events—has helped garden centres attract a broader customer base.

Online platforms and e-commerce have become integral to the success of garden centres, especially in densely populated regions like Germany and France.

European garden centres face challenges including climate change, rising costs of imported plants, and competition from DIY stores and online retailers. Nonetheless, the sector continues to innovate, balancing tradition with modern retail strategies.

=== Notable chains ===
- Truffaut (France)
- Jardiland (France)
- Intratuin (Netherlands)
- Dehner (Germany)
- Viridea (Italy)
- Verdecora (Spain)
- Leroy Merlin (France)
