= List of Oregon wildfires =

List of wildfires in the U.S. state of Oregon

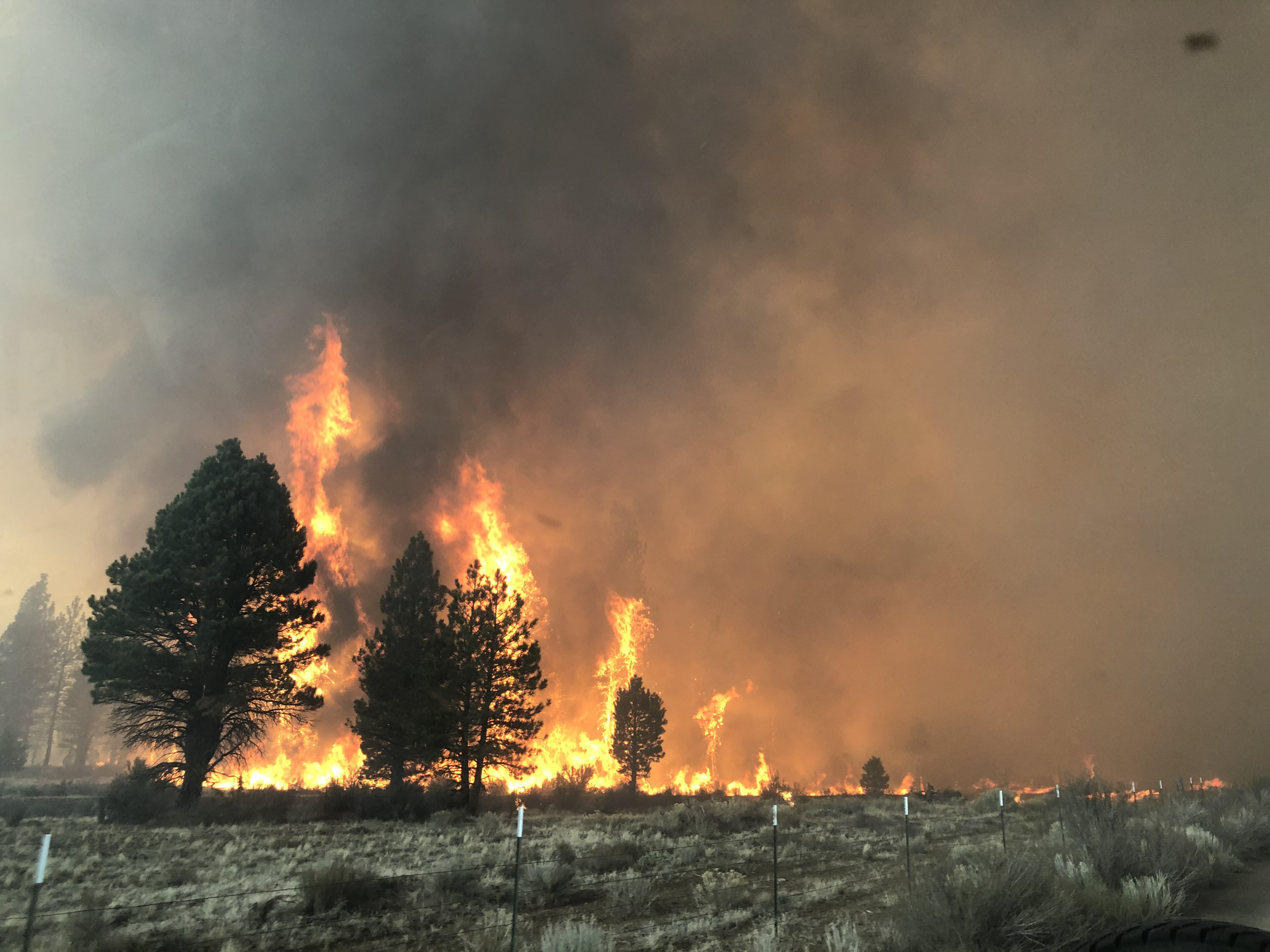
Ponina Fire in 2021

There have been many notable wildfires in the history of the US state of Oregon.

== Background ==
"Fire season" in Oregon typically begins in mid-May and ends with the first rains that normally begins in late September. Drought, snowpack levels, and local weather conditions play a role in Oregon's fire season, particularly in Eastern and Southwest Oregon. During peak fire season from July to September, most wildfires are caused by lightning, while ignitions in the early and later parts of the season are related to humans. Warm, dry conditions in summer heighten the wildfire risk. After over 100 years of fire suppression and prevention of all fires, there is now an abundance of fuel. Climate change is leading to a reduced snowpack with an earlier and reduced snowmelt, so there is a higher risk for areas that receive wildfires.

== List ==
- 1902
  - Yacolt Burn
- 1933–1951
  - Tillamook Burn (1933, 1939, 1945)
  - Bandon Fire (1936)
- 1966
  - Oxbow Fire
- 1996
  - Simnasho Fire
  - Ashwood-Donnybrook Fire
- 2000
  - Jackson Fire
- 2001
  - Lakeview Complex
- 2002
  - Biscuit Fire
  - Toolbox Complex
- 2003
  - B&B Complex
- 2006
  - South End Complex
- 2007
  - Egley Complex
- 2009
  - Tumblebug Complex
- 2011
  - High Cascades Complex
- 2012
  - Barry Point Fire
  - Lava Fire
  - Long Draw Fire
  - Holloway Fire
  - Miller Homestead Fire
- 2013 Douglas Complex
- 2014
  - Buzzard Complex
- 2015
- 2017
  - Chetco Bar Fire
  - Cinder Butte Fire
  - Eagle Creek Fire
  - High Cascades Complex
  - Jones Fire
  - Milli Fire
  - Nash Fire
  - Whitewater Fire
- 2018
  - Boxcar Fire
  - Graham Fire
  - Jack Knife Fire
  - Klamathon Fire
  - Klondike Fire
  - Long Hollow Fire
  - Miles Fire
  - South Valley Fire
  - Substation Fire
  - Whitewater Fire
- 2020 (Western U.S.)
  - Holiday Farm Fire
  - Alameda Fire
  - Santiam Fire
  - Slater and Devil fires
  - Archie Creek Fire
- 2021
  - Bootleg Fire
  - Jack Fire
  - Joseph Canyon Fire
- 2022
  - Cedar Creek Fire
- 2023
  - Flat Fire
- 2024
  - Durkee Fire
- 2025
  - Cram Fire
  - Flat Fire
- 2026
  - Big Grass Fire
  - Grasshopper Fire
