= Paradise Fire =

Paradise Fire may refer to:

- Paradise Fire (2003), a 2003 California wildfire that burned in San Diego County, California between October and November 2003
- Paradise Fire (2005), a 2005 California wildfire that burned in San Bernardino County, California in June 2005
- Paradise Fire (2008), a 2008 California wildfire that burned in Humboldt County, California in 2008
- Paradise Fire (2015), a 2015 Washington wildfire that burned in Olympic National Park, Washington in 2015
- Paradise Fire (2017), a fire that merged into the High Cascades Complex fires in Oregon in August 2017
- Paradise Fire (2018), another name for the Camp Fire (2018) in Butte County, California
- Paradise Fire (2021), a fire in north-central Kansas, that began on December 17, 2021 and burned about 400,000 acres. Two people died. The area has many farms and ranches, and a large number of cattle died.
