= 2017 Oregon wildfires =

Wildfire season in Oregon, United States

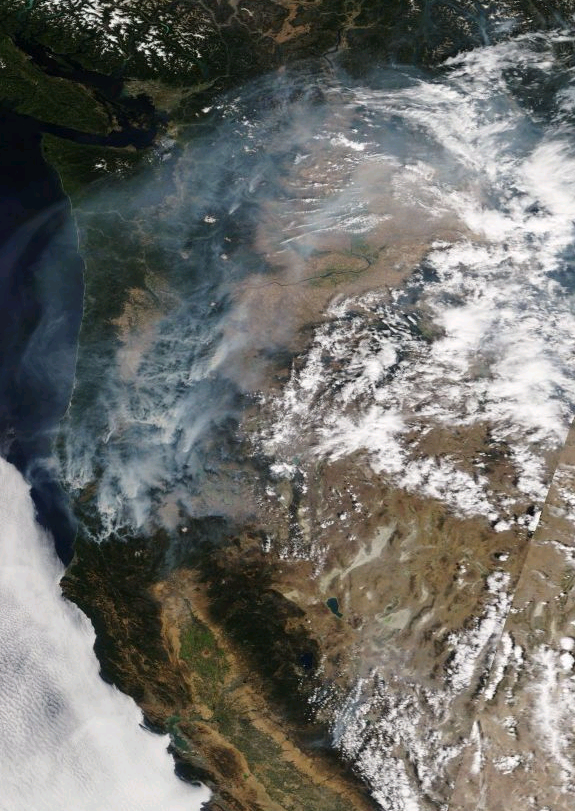
- US West Coast August 29, 2017 (satellite image). Large fires visible in the Washington and Oregon Cascades, with smoke from Oregon flowing north.
- Date: June–October, 2017

Statistics
- Total fires: 1,069
- Total area: 451,863 acres (1,828.62 km^{2})

The 2017 Oregon wildfires were a series of wildfires that burned over the course of 2017.

The 2017 fire season in the state of Oregon was a particularly notable one. There has been a trend for the last three decades that shows an increase in the overall number of wildfires as well as the fire season length in the state of Oregon. In 2017 Oregon experienced a total of 1,069 reported wildfires: with 779 human ignited and 290 ignited by lightning strikes. These fires burned a total area of 451,863 acres. The catalyst for these fires was the abnormal weather patterns that persisted throughout 2017.

Fire season typically begins in Oregon in May. Fires burning through September 2017 led to the month being dubbed "Smoketember" in Oregon, with air quality in western Oregon listed from "Unhealthy" to "Hazardous" in early weeks. NASA published images of the Oregon, shown the typically green state to be highly obscured by smoke, as seen from space. 2017 was unusual for the large number of fires occurring west of the Cascade Range in dense Douglas-fir forest in contrast to the frequent-fire pine ecosystems to the east.

Large fires include the Chetco Bar Fire in Curry County, Oregon, and the Eagle Creek Fire in the Columbia River Gorge National Scenic Area, which was started by illegal fireworks use. Fires in the Columbia River Gorge shut down Interstate 84, the state's major east–west freeway, for several days in early September.

== Background ==
"Fire season" in Oregon typically begins in mid-May and ends with the first rains that normally begins in late September. Drought, snowpack levels, and local weather conditions play a role in Oregon's fire season, particularly in Eastern and Southwest Oregon. During peak fire season from July to September, most wildfires are caused by lightning, while ignitions in the early and later parts of the season are related to humans. Warm, dry conditions in summer heighten the wildfire risk. After over 100 years of fire suppression and prevention of all fires, there is now an abundance of fuel. Climate change is leading to a reduced snowpack with an earlier and reduced snowmelt, so there is a higher risk for areas that receive wildfires.

== 2017 climate in Oregon ==
The 2016/2017 winter in Oregon was the second wettest winter in the past 75 years. Between October 1, 2016, and April 26, 2017, Portland International Airport received 45.5 inches (116 centimeters) of rain. The month of February 2017 was the wettest February on record in Oregon with 10.36 inches (26 centimeters) of rain. During the month of August, the weather station at Portland International Airport recorded a monthly average temperature of 73.6 degrees Fahrenheit (23.1 C) with the daily average temperature hitting 87 degrees Fahrenheit (30.5 C). The average temperature during the month of August 2017 was five degrees higher than the average August temperature recorded since 1941. It stands to be the second hottest August on record.

The extreme winter and summer weather that occurred in 2017 was met by some dangerous weather patterns in the late summer months. Early August through September in Southern Oregon saw several waves of thunderstorms. These storm systems brought rainfall which helped slow the growth of existing wildfires. However, the storms also brought lighting which resulted in the ignition of new fires. These storms travel on fast moving paths. After one these storms moves over an area, it quickly returns to a hot dry state. This allows for the newly ignited fires to spread quickly and develop into full wildfires.

== Significance of the 2017 fire season ==
The future climate in the Pacific Northwest is expected to be significantly different. Projections show that annual temperatures will rise faster than the global norm. Although temperatures will be higher, winters are expected to experience more rainfall. These seasonal extremes are exactly the type of trends that were experienced in 2017. Climatic patterns such as these provide ample rainfall throughout the spring which allows for high rates of plant growth. The high temperatures in the summer then quickly dries up the new growth. This leads to large spread availability of dry grasses and small diameter fuels. The combination of these climate driven phenomenon are what led to the extreme fire season in Oregon in 2017.

== Cheatgrass ==
Another problem plaguing Oregon in 2017 was invasive cheatgrass. This grass has its origins in Eurasia and has become a huge problem in Oregon. In burned areas this grass quickly replaces native vegetation such as sagebrush. Cheatgrass is especially dangerous in regards to wildfires because it is highly dependent on water and typically dries out a month before native Oregon grasses. The high rainfall in 2017 allowed cheatgrass to spread abundantly throughout eastern Oregon. In areas that have cheatgrass, fire seasons have essentially been lengthened by a month due to the sooner availability of fuel. Due to its ability to both cause fires and repopulate burned areas cheatgrass is in a positive feedback loop of continual dispersal.

== Human-ignited fires ==
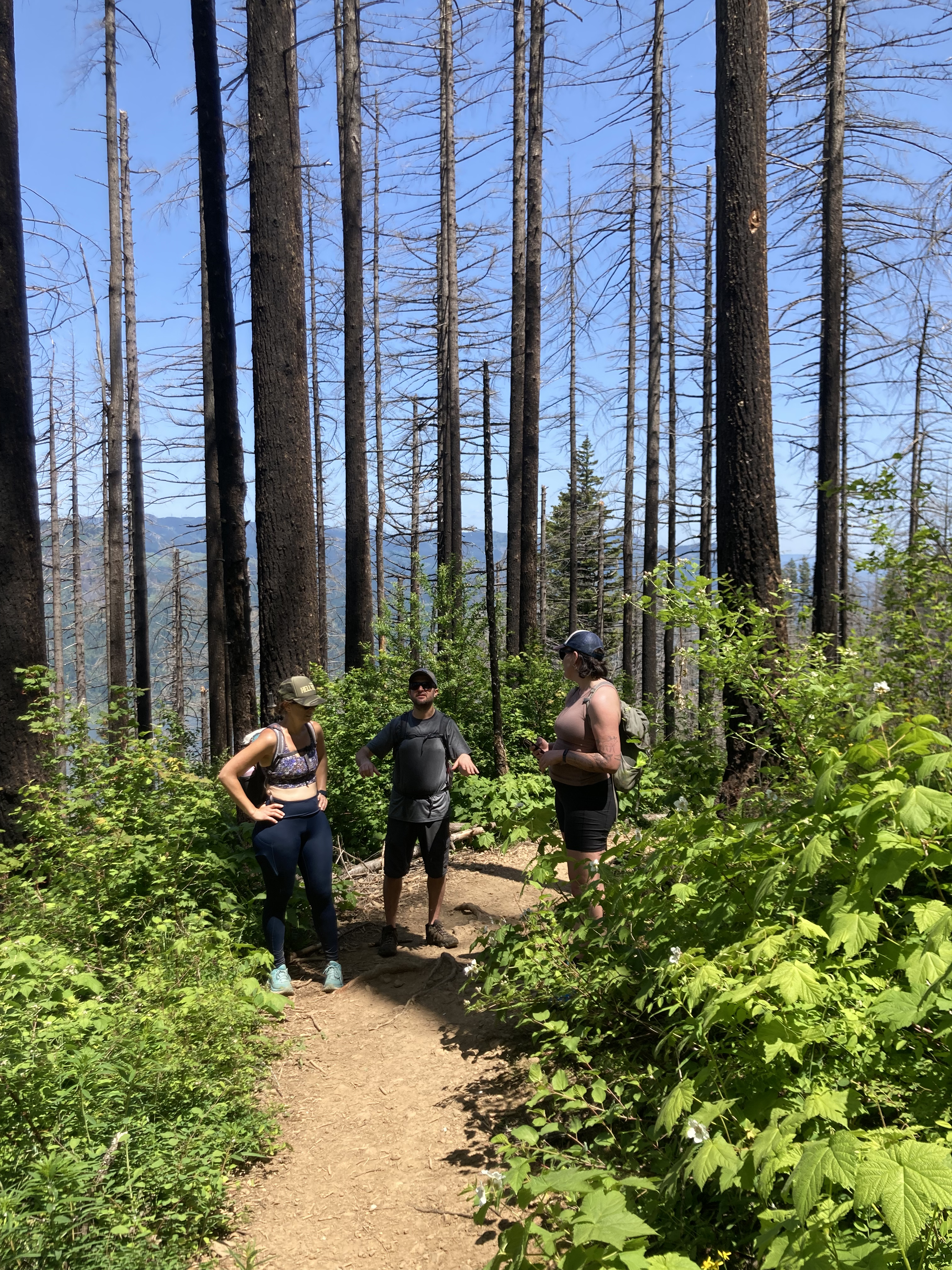
Three hikers observe damage from the Eagle Creek Fire in May 2023

Oregon’s population has been in a steady state of growth for the last three decades. With higher populations comes higher risk of human ignited forest fires. 2017 saw the devastating effects of human influenced fires. The Eagle Creek Fire burned 48,831 acres of land. This fire was ignited by a smoke bomb carelessly thrown by a 15-year-old boy. Something as simple as the exhaust pipe of a car or a cigarette out of a car window can start a devastating fire.

== Wildfires ==
The following is a list of wildfires that burned more than 1,000 acres (400 ha), or produced significant structural damage or loss of life

Name	National Forest	Acres Burned	Start date	Containment Date (Note: Containment means that fire crews have established and secured control lines around the fire's perimeter. These lines are artificial barriers, like trenches or cleared vegetation, designed to stop the fire's spread, or natural barriers like rivers. Containment reflects progress in managing the fire but does not necessarily mean the fire is starved of fuel, under control, or put out.)	Notes	Ref
Milli Fire	Deschutes National Forest	24,079	August 11, 2017	September 24, 2017	Cause:Lighting	
Cinder Butte Fire	Bureau of Land Management	52,462	August 2, 2017	August 10, 2017	Cause:Unknown/Man caused	
Desolation Fire	Ochoco National Forest	4,512	September 9, 2017	Unknown	Cause:Lightning holdover fire	
High Cascades Complex	Rogue River–Siskiyou National Forest Fremont–Winema National Forest Umpqua National Forest Crater Lake National Park	27,476	August 13, 2017	approx. October 15, 2017	Cause:Lighting/Natural	
Horse Creek Complex	Willamette National Forest	42,489	August 10, 2017	approx. September 27, 2017	Cause:Lighting	
Staley Fire	Willamette National Forest	2,300	August 9, 2017	approx. December 1, 2017	Cause:Lighting	
Jones Fire	Willamette National Forest	10,114	August 10, 2017	approx. October 14, 2017	Cause:Lightning/Natural	
Whitewater Fire	Willamette National Forest	14,451	July 23, 2017	October 31, 2017	Cause:Lightning/Natural	
Umpqua North Complex	Umpqua National Forest	43,158	August 11, 2017	approx. October 30, 2017	Cause:Unknown	
Falcon Complex	Umpqua National Forest	2,935	August 8, 2017	September 15, 2017	Cause:Lightning/Natural	
Chetco Bar Fire	Rogue River–Siskiyou National Forest	191,125	July 12, 2017	November 2, 2017	Cause:Lightning, 8th largest fire in Oregon’s recorded history	
Miller Complex	Rogue River–Siskiyou National Forest	39,715	August 14, 2017	November 9, 2017	Cause:Lightning	
Eagle Creek Fire	Columbia River Gorge National Scenic Area	48,831	September 2, 2017	November 30, 2017	Cause:Human	

Others fires include:

- Ana Fire
- Blanket Creek Fire
- Indian Creek Fire
- Upper Mine Fire
- Horse Prairie Fire – Douglas County, Oregon
- Jade Creek Fire – Fremont–Winema National Forest
- Potato Hill Fire – Willamette National Forest
- Nash Fire – Willamette National Forest and Deschutes National Forest
- North Pelican Fire – Fremont-Winema National Forest

== Fires on ODF land ==
The majority of the burned area within Oregon Department of Forestry (ODF) held land occurred within the SOA fire region which includes the districts: Southwest, Coos, Douglas, South Cascade, and Western Lane. The SOA fire region experienced 38,384.33 acres of burned land. The EOA fire region had the second highest amount of burned area and includes the fire districts of: Central Oregon, Northeast Oregon, Klamath- Lake, and Walker Range. This fire region experienced a total of 4,992.6 acres of burned land. The NOA saw the least amount of area burned but still had 151 individual fires ignited within the region. The NOA fire region includes the fire districts of: Tillamook, Astoria, Forest Grove, West Oregon, and North Cascade. The fires in this region accounted for a total of 2168.88 acres of burned land. In 2017 the Oregon Department of Forestry had 45,681.5 acres of land burned in their forests.
