= 2021 Oregon wildfires =

Natural disasters in the USA

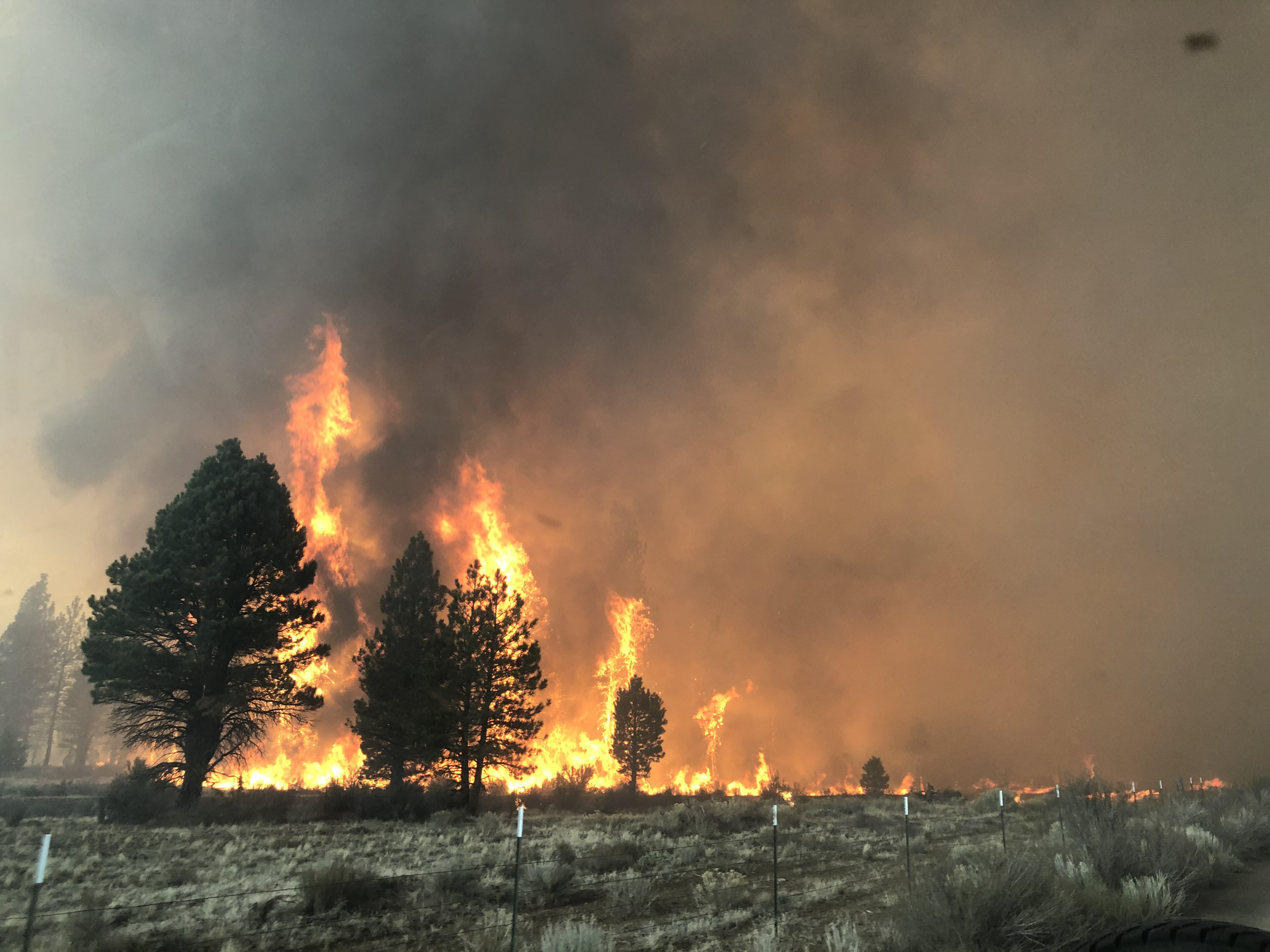
- The fire in Ponina on April 18, 2021
- Date: May 15, 2021 – January 12, 2022

Statistics
- Total fires: 1,661
- Total area: 827,596 acres (334,916 ha)

Impacts
- Deaths: 1

The 2021 Oregon wildfire season began in May 2021. More than 1,000 fires had burned at least 518,303 acres (209,750 ha) across the state as of July 21, 2021. As of August 1, it was expected that the fires might not be contained for months.

The wildfire season in Oregon experienced an early start due to an abnormally dry spring coupled with low snowpack levels amid an ongoing drought. The 2021 season has been outpacing the destructive previous season, with nearly 10 times as many acres have burned as of July 20 compared to the previous year through that date, according to the NIFC's Northwest Coordination Center.

== Background ==
"Fire season" in Oregon typically begins in mid-May and ends with the first rains that normally begins in late September. Drought, snowpack levels, and local weather conditions play a role in Oregon's fire season, particularly in Eastern and Southwest Oregon. During peak fire season from July to September, most wildfires are caused by lightning, while ignitions in the early and later parts of the season are related to humans. Warm, dry conditions in summer heighten the wildfire risk. After over 100 years of fire suppression and prevention of all fires, there is now an abundance of fuel. Climate change is leading to a reduced snowpack with an earlier and reduced snowmelt, so there is a higher risk for areas that receive wildfires.

Oregon has been experiencing increasingly large fire seasons over the last few decades, with the preceding 2020 wildfire season being one of the most destructive in the state's history. As with much of the rest of the Western United States, fire officials were predicting another above-average season in 2021 due to expected low precipitation and high temperatures. The state's declaration of the start of wildfire season in mid-May marked the earliest start to a fire season in the state in over 40 years. In preparation for the wildfire season, forest officials performed prescribed burns and state lawmakers worked on wildfire-mitigation legislation designed to create wildfire risk maps, update building codes, and create new rules related to defensible space around homes in the wildland–urban interface.

== List of wildfires ==
The following is a list of fires that burned more than 1,000 acres (400 ha), or produced significant structural damage or casualties.

Name	County	Acres	Start date	Containment date (Note: Containment means that fire crews have established and secured control lines around the fire's perimeter. These lines are artificial barriers, like trenches or cleared vegetation, designed to stop the fire's spread, or natural barriers like rivers. Containment reflects progress in managing the fire but does not necessarily mean the fire is starved of fuel, under control, or put out.)	Notes	Ref
Ponina	Klamath	1,641	April 18	April 23	Lightning-sparked	
Dry Creek	Wallowa	1,564	June 4	June 30	Lightning-sparked	
Joseph Canyon	Wallowa, Asotin (WA)	7,610	June 4	July 15	Lightning-sparked	
S-503	Wasco	6,822	June 18	August 18	Unknown cause, 3 injuries	
Cutoff	Klamath	1,288	June 19	June 30	Unknown cause, 22 structures destroyed, 1 injury	
Wrentham Market	Wasco	7,222	June 29	July 3	Unknown cause, 2 structures destroyed	
Rattlesnake	Wasco, Jefferson	5,479	June 30	August 4	Unknown cause	
Ryegrass 0444 RS	Crook	1,102	June 30	July 4	Lightning-sparked	
Upton	Harney	1,500	July 1	July 3	Lightning-sparked	
Jack	Douglas	24,165	July 5	November 29	Human-caused, 18 injuries	
Bootleg	Klamath, Lake	413,717	July 6	August 14	Lightning-sparked, merged with the Log Fire on July 19, 408 structures destroyed, 342 vehicles destroyed, 20 injuries. It was the largest wildfire in the United States in the 2021 wildfire season, until it was overtaken by the Dixie Fire in Northern California in early August.	
Grandview	Jefferson, Deschutes	6,032	July 11	July 25	Unknown cause, 3 injuries	
Log	Lake, Klamath	16,337	July 12	August 14	Unknown cause, merged with the Bootleg Fire on July 19	
Elbow Creek	Wallowa	22,960	July 15	September 24	Unknown cause, 6 structures destroyed, 8 injuries	
Deep Creek 0685 RN	Wasco	1,250	July 29	August 3	Lightning-sparked	
Middle Fork Complex	Lane	30,928	July 29	January 12	Unknown cause, 2 injuries, 1 firefighter fatality. The complex consists of 12 individual fires, of which the largest are the Gales Creek Fire and the Kwis Fire.	
Rough Patch Complex	Lane	50,563	July 29	November 29	Lightning-sparked. The complex consists of 19 individual fires, of which the largest is the Chaos Fire.	
Skyline Ridge Complex	Douglas	5,760	August 1	August 30	Lightning-sparked. The complex consists of numerous individual fires, of which the largest are the Poole Fire and the Dismal Creek 210 Fire Fire.	
Bull Complex	Marion	24,894	August 2	November 19	Lightning-sparked, 1 structure destroyed. Formerly referred to as the Janus Complex. The complex consists of 5 individual fires, of which the largest are the Janus Fire, the Ridge Fire, and the Kola Fire.	
Black Butte	Grant	22,445	August 3	September 27	Lightning-sparked, 6 injuries	
Devil's Knob Complex	Douglas	70,110	August 3	October 19	Lightning-sparked, 1 structure destroyed. The complex consists of 52 individual fires.	
Fox Complex	Lake	9,754	August 13	September 1	Lightning-sparked, 4 structures destroyed. The complex consists of the Patton Meadow Fire and the Willow Valley Fire.	
Cougar Peak	Lake	91,810	September 7	October 21	Unknown cause, 10 structures destroyed, 9 injuries	
Big Meadow	Harney	2,643	September 9	September 26	Lightning-sparked, 3 injuries	

== Response ==
At the end of July 2021, Governor Kate Brown signed a bill to invest $220 million in wildfire prevention, preparedness, and response.

== See also ==
- 2021 Western North America heat wave
- List of Oregon wildfires
