= Nash Fire =

2017 wildfire in the U.S. state of Oregon

- Part of the 2017 Oregon wildfires
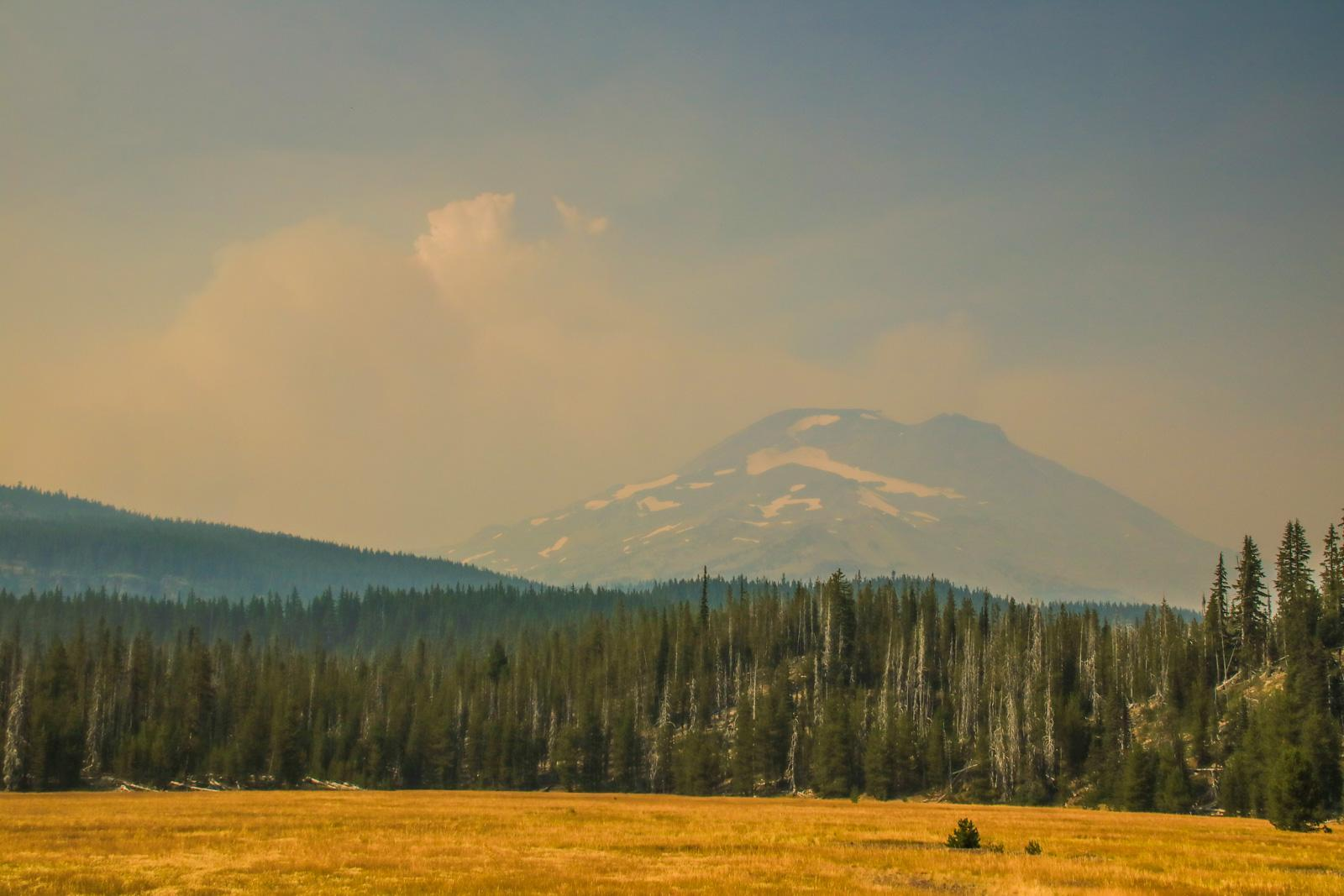
- The Nash Fire column over the South Sister volcano on September 4, 2017
- Date: August 10, 2017 –
- Location: Deschutes National Forest and Willamette National Forest, Oregon, United States
- Coordinates: 44.068°N 121.878°W

Statistics
- Burned area: 6,738 acres (27 km^{2})

Ignition
- Cause: Lightning

Map
- Location of fire in Oregon.

The Nash Fire is a wildfire that occurred in the Deschutes National Forest and Willamette National Forest, on the southwest slope of the South Sister Mountain in Oregon in the United States. The fire, which was started by lightning, started on August 10, 2017. The Nash Fire was part of the Horse Creek Complex but for reporting purposes was removed from the complex by authorities. The fire threatened the campgrounds and structures at Elk Lake, Hosmer Lake, Lava Lake, and Little Lava Lake.

== Events ==
The Nash Fire was started on August 10, 2017, by a lightning strike on the southwest slope of the South Sister Mountain in the Three Sisters Wilderness Area in the Willamette National Forest. Smokejumpers were recruited to fight the fire, but were eventually removed due to high risk from the fire and the steep terrain, therefore the fire was monitored by air, with infra-red detecting flights reporting the fire being at 2,528 acres (10 km^{2}) by August 31.

Fire managers expressed concern about the growth of the fire moving out of the wilderness and towards populated recreation areas. Therefore, firefighters began fire protection on structures in Elk Lake, including the Elk Lake Resort, 40 residences, and the historic Forest Service Elk Lake Guard Station. Air quality had declined rapidly for the region, being declared "unhealthy" by authorities. By September 2, trail closures began in the forests. The Separation Fire merged with the Nash Fire when crossing Separation Creek.

By September 9, the fire had slowed thanks to cool weather. It had burned to the edge of Nash Lake, about four miles from Elk Lake. Crews continued working to remove fuels, creating a fuel break, along the Cascade Lakes Scenic Byway. In addition to helping protect structures at Elk and Lava Lakes, crews also began protecting the Mt. Bachelor Ski Resort.

As of December 16, the fire had burned 6,738 acres (27 km^{2}).

== Closures and evacuations ==
As of September 2, trail closures were in place for Wickiup Plains, South Sister/Devil's Lake, Sisters Mirror Lake, Elk Lake, Crater Ditch, Broken top and PCT from Irish and Taylor Lake north to Olallie Lake.
