= Lava Fire (2012) =

2012 wildfire in Oregon

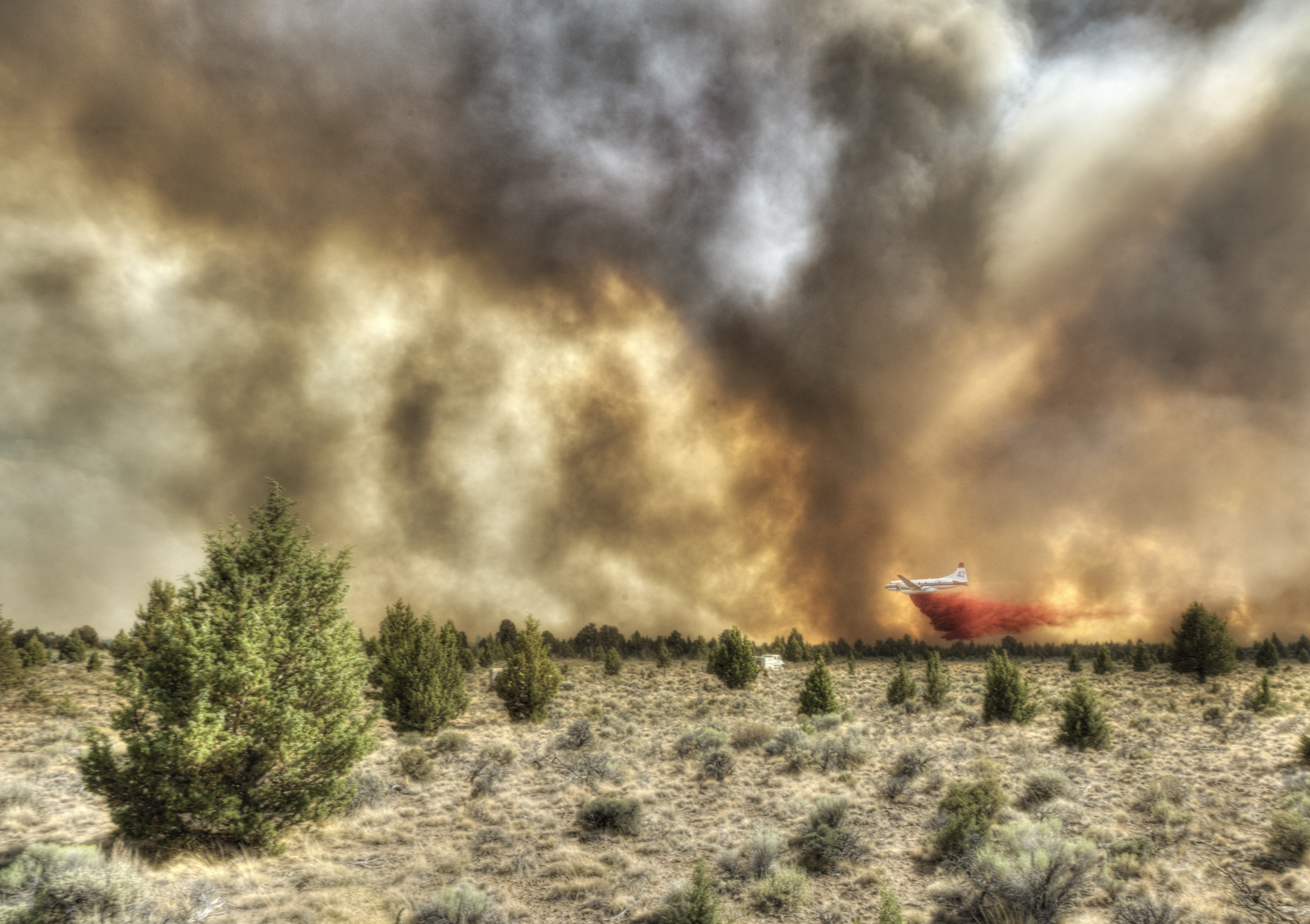
- Air tanker dropping retardant on Lava Fire
- Date: July 23, 2012 – August 15, 2012
- Location: Lake County, Oregon, U.S.
- Coordinates: 43.4892°N 120.7572°W

Statistics
- Burned area: 21,546 acres (87 km^{2})
- Land use: Public rangeland and lava beds

Ignition
- Cause: Lightning

Map
- Location of fire in Oregon

The Lava Fire was a wildfire that burned over 21,500 acres (87 km^{2}) of Oregon rangeland during the summer of 2012. The fire began on 23 July 2012, the result of a lightning strike. The fire consumed rangeland vegetation and scrub forest located in and around lava beds in northern Lake County. The burned area was on public land administered by the Bureau of Land Management including a large area within a wilderness study area. Firefighters battled the blaze for over three weeks. At the peak of the firefighting effort, there were over 275 personnel working on the fire.

== Origin ==
In late July 2012, a thunderstorm passed over northern Lake County in south central Oregon. A lightning strike from the storm started a wildfire on land administered by the Bureau of Land Management, approximately 15 miles (24 km) northeast of Fort Rock, Oregon. The fire was reported in the late morning of 23 July. The bureau named it the Lava Fire.

A combination of hot dry weather and gusty winds created dangerous fire conditions in the Fort Rock area. As a result, the creeping fire ignited by the original lightning strike began to burn more actively. Firefighters battled the blaze for the next several weeks as the fire consumed public rangeland and scrub forest in and around remote lava beds on the Lakeview Bureau of Land Management District.

== Chronology ==
- On 23 July, a fire was reported on public land about 15 miles (24 km) northeast of the small unincorporated community of Fort Rock in northern Lake County, Oregon. Initially, the Bureau of Land Management dispatched five pumper engines and two water tenders to the fire. Over the next two days, warm temperatures and gusty winds pushed the fire along while crews worked to confine the blaze in remote lava beds.
- By 25 July, the fire had consumed 130 acres (0.53 km^{2}). The rugged lava beds made it difficult for firefighters to attack the fire directly. Instead crews worked around the perimeter of the fire while three air tankers dropped six loads of retardant on the north end of the fire. On 25 July, the Fremont-Winema National Forest and Oregon Department of Forestry sent crews to the fire. The next day, the Bureau of Land Management added a 20-person hand crew and additional pumper engines were provided by from Fremont-Winema National Forest, the Modoc National Forest, and Central Oregon Fire Management Services.

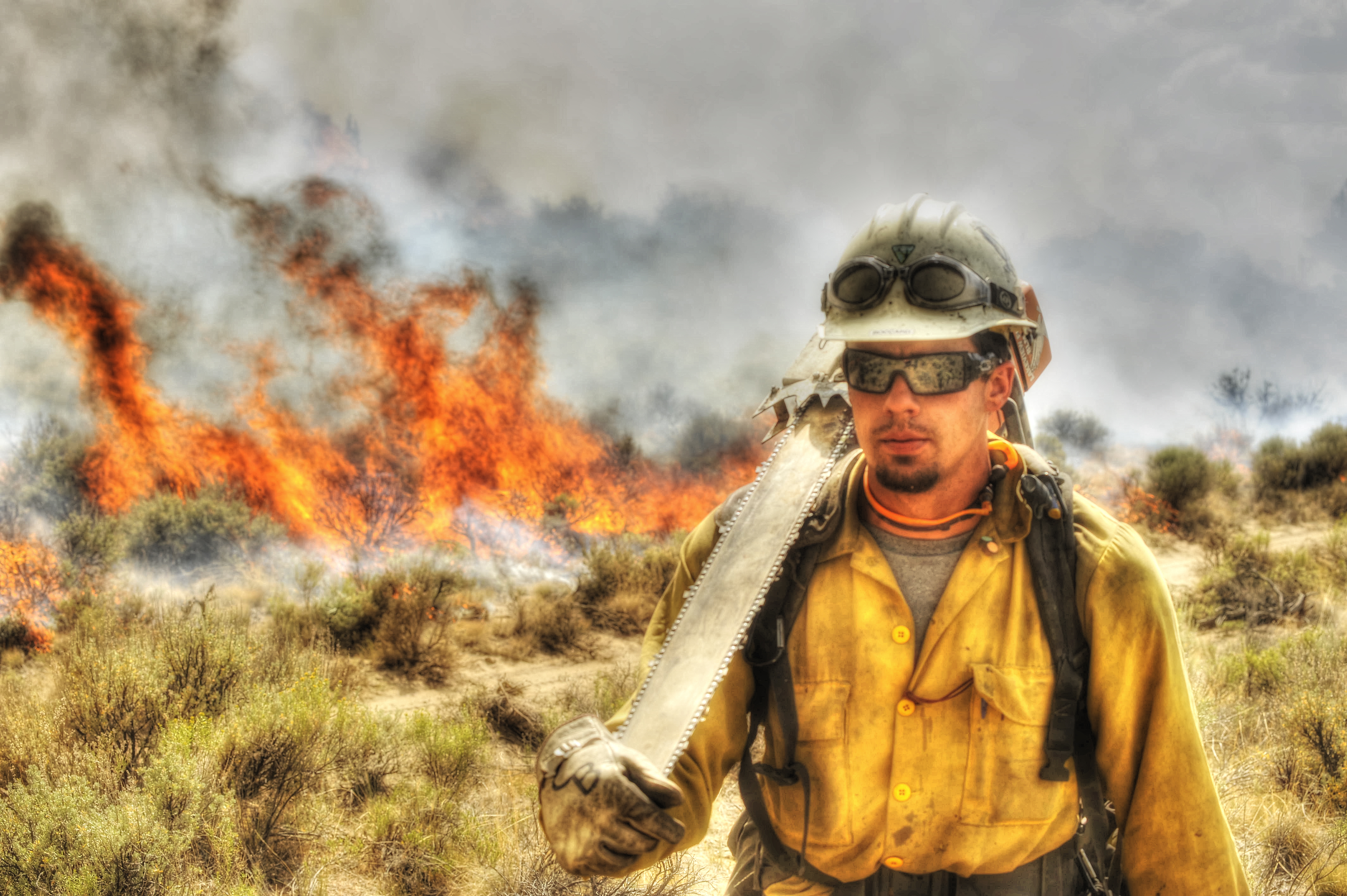
Firefighter (Corbin Boccard, Crew 7 Veterans) working the line on 27 July

- On 27 July, the fire had covered 200 acres (0.81 km^{2}). At that time, it was only 5 percent contained despite all the manpower and equipment that was deployed on the fire.
- Between 28 July and 30 July 2012 multi-agency fire crews worked on the fire line as the blaze continued to grow. On 29 July, the fire covered to 5,000 acres (20 km^{2}). Late that afternoon, a leadership team from the South Central Oregon Fire Management Partnership arrived to oversee the fire suppression effort. By 30 July, the fire had grown to 8,100 acres (33 km^{2}). It was estimated that the fire was 20 percent contained and there were 232 personnel working on the fire. Fire fighters conducted burn out operations along the fire line and roadways. Hot and dry weather conditions spread smoke across a wide area while the Bureau of Land Management closed roads in the area around the fire.
- On 31 July, the fire covered 10,000 acres (40 km^{2}). It was 25 percent contained and there were 250 firefighters working to control the fire. The terrain in the lava beds was too rugged for fire trucks so crews worked around the perimeter of the lava flow, building a 300-foot (91 m) burned-out buffer between the fire and surrounding vegetation. During the day, three helicopters began dumping water on the fire. Roads in the area remained closed. Fire officials told the media that it could be weeks before the fire was fully extinguished.
- The progress of the fire had slowed by 1 August. It only grew an additional 500 acres (2.0 km^{2}) overnight, so the burned acreage totalled 10,500 acres (42 km^{2}). There were 275 firefighters on-site and containment was 30 percent. Improved weather conditions helped fire crews as they worked to build fire lines around the perimeter of the lava beds. The goal was to keep the fire from leaving the lava beds and moving into an adjacent Bureau of Land Management wilderness study area. While fire vehicle traffic remained heavy, the Bureau of Land Management decided to reopen roads in the area. Fire managers estimated the fire would be fully mid-August.
- On 2 August, the fire grew significantly as firefighter conducted large scale back burning around the fire's perimeter. The back burning operation torched western juniper trees, sagebrush, and grass, clearing a buffer around the entire fire. By the end of the day, the total acreage burned by the Lava Fire was 21,300 acres (86 km^{2}). Fire officials estimated that the fire was 50 percent contained.
- With the completion of the back burning operation on 3 August, the fire reached its final size. The total acreage burned was over 21,500 acres (87 km^{2}). At that time, it was estimated that the fire was 70 percent contained. Fire managers told the media that the public should expect heavy traffic for the next few days. They also said smoke would persist for a few weeks as the fire was being mopped up.
- By 6 August, the fire was estimated to be 85 percent contained. The last fire report for the Lava Fire was issued on 7 August. Fire officials said that crews would continue working around the perimeter until the entire fire area was completely secure. The officials also said that they expected the fire to be fully extinguished by 15 August.

== Synopsis ==
In the Bureau of Land Management's final update, the size of the Lava Fire was reported as 21,546 acres (87.19 km^{2}). All of the burned area was United States Government land administered by the Bureau of Land Management. The Lava Fire burned rangeland and scrub forest, primarily in and around lava beds. The main vegetation burned by the fire was sagebrush and grass along with scattered western juniper trees in some areas.

On 1 August 2012, the Lava Fire was the largest active fire in the state of Oregon. At its peak, there were 275 firefighters from the Bureau of Land Management, Forest Service, and the Oregon Department of Forestry working on-site. Equipment dispatched to the fire included pumper trucks, water tankers, helicopters, and air tankers.

== Images ==
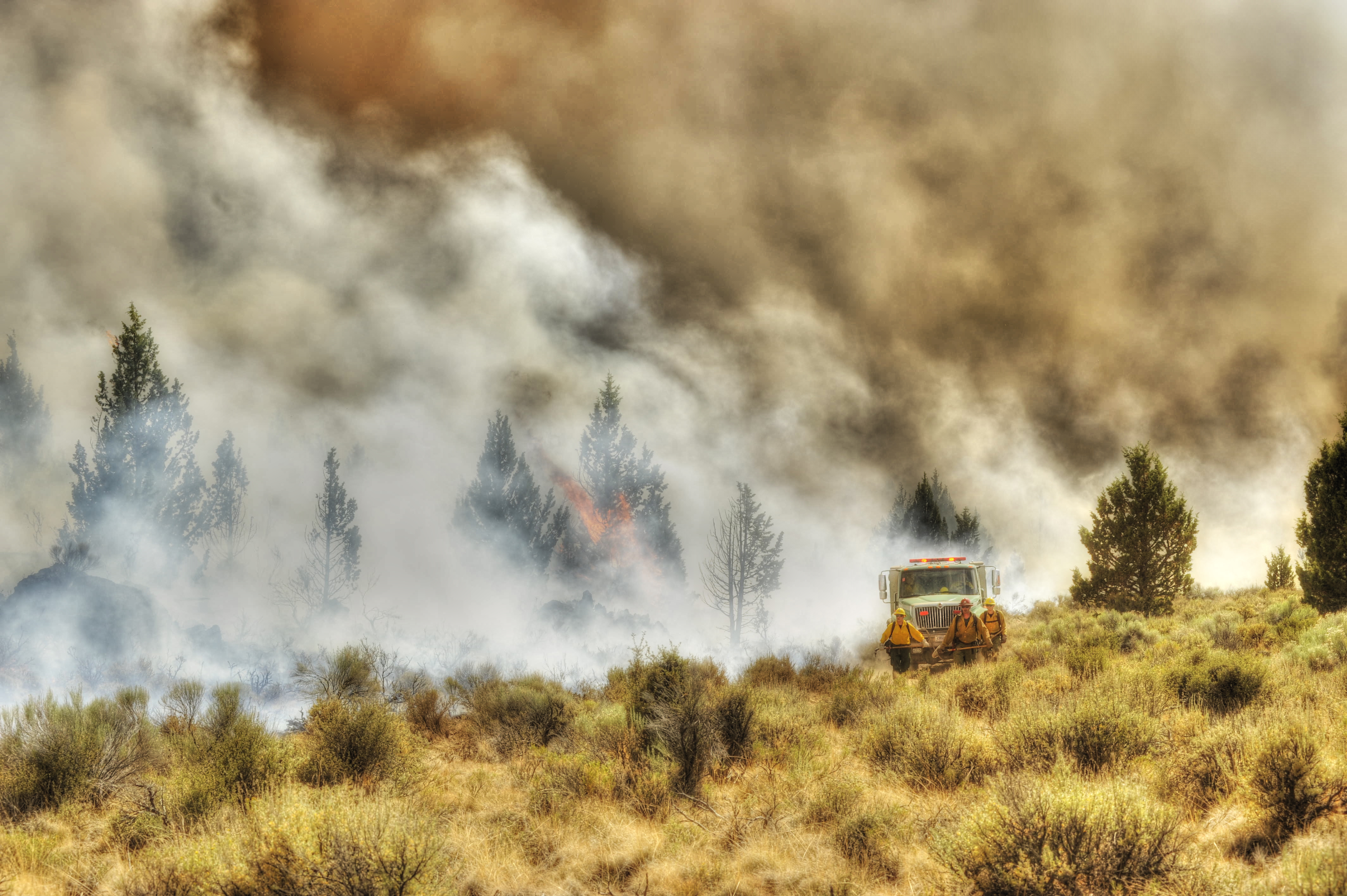
Pumper crew on line

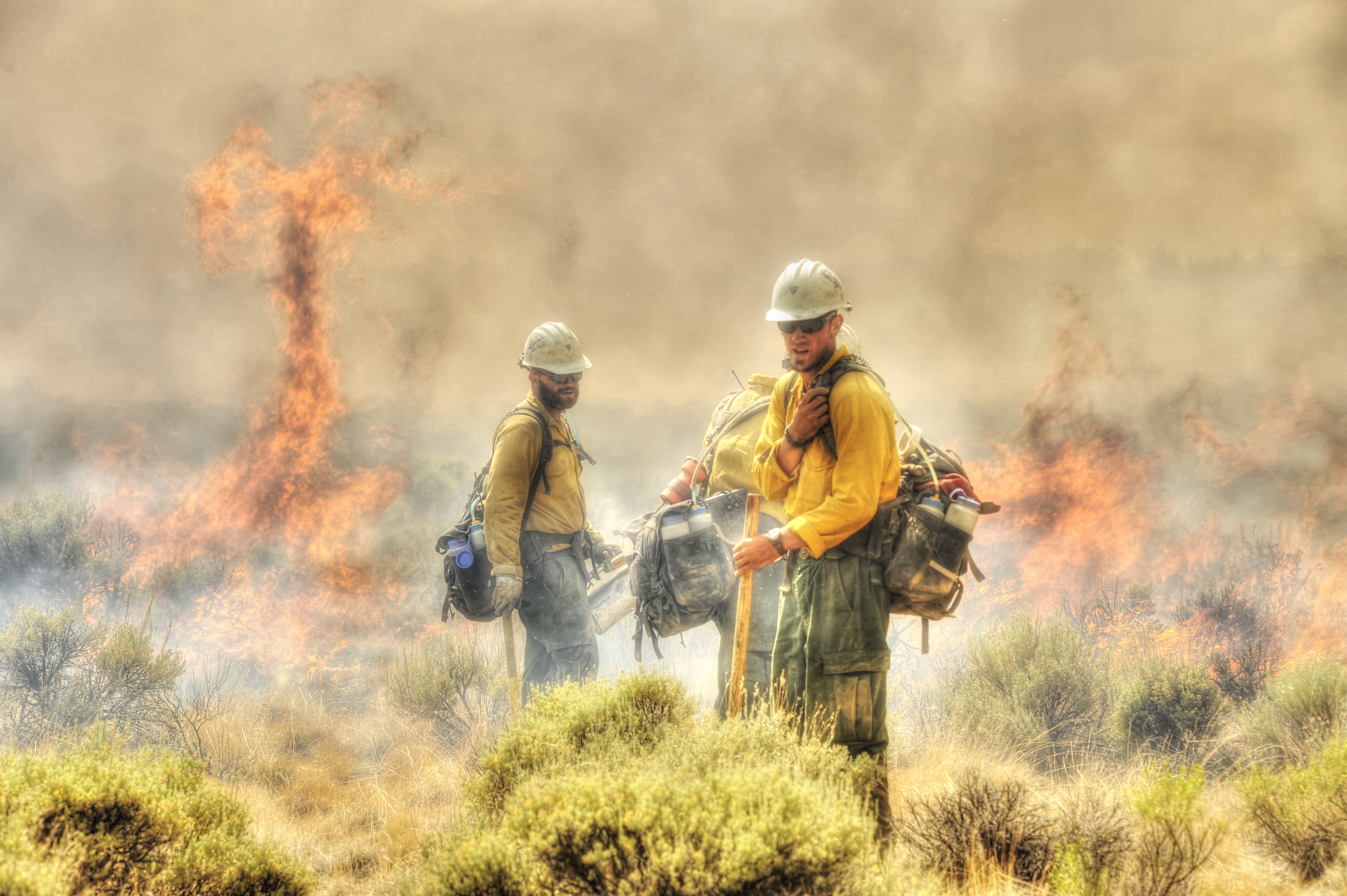
Hand crew at work

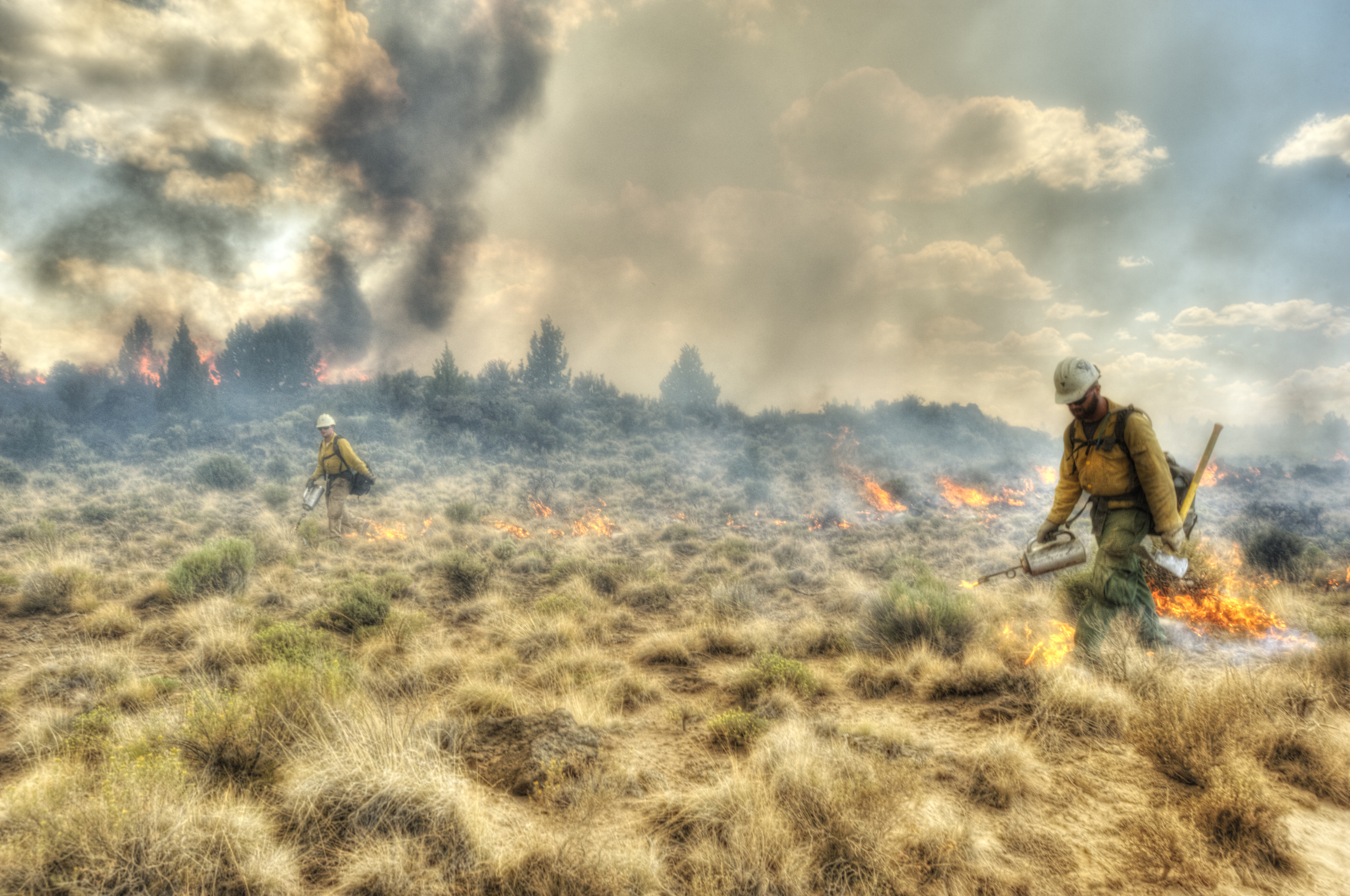
Back burning crew

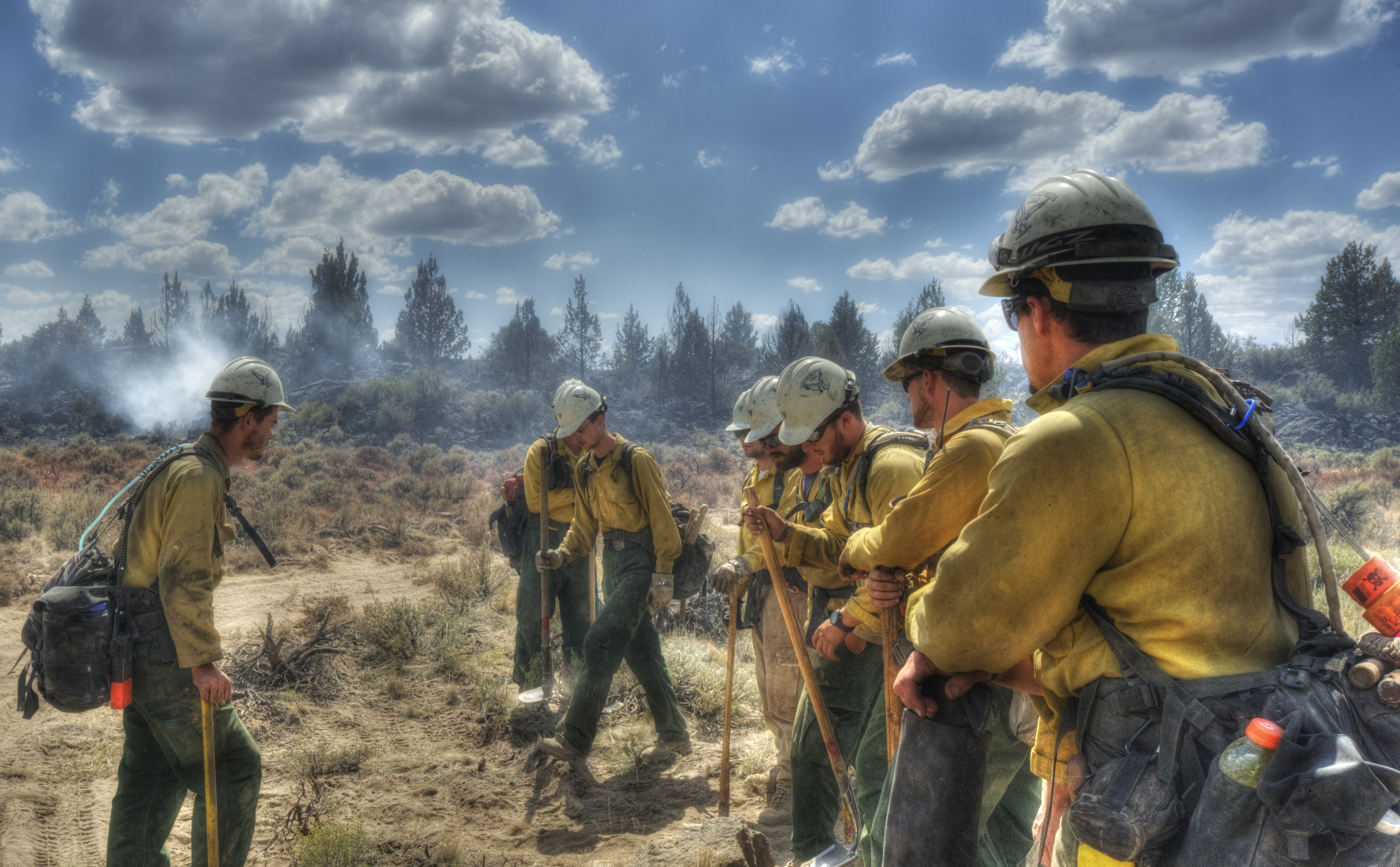
Hand crew resting
