= Cinder Butte Fire =

2017 wildfire in Oregon

- Part of the 2017 Oregon wildfires
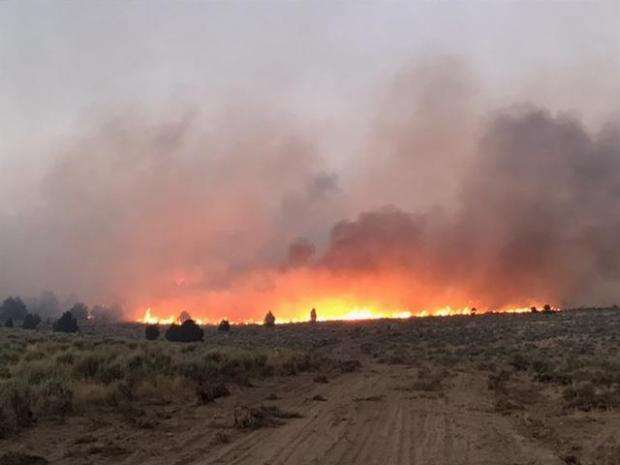
- Cinder Butte Fire on 5 August 2017
- Date: 2 August 2017 – 10 August 2017
- Location: Lake and Harney counties, Oregon, US
- Coordinates: 43.578°N 119.94°W

Statistics
- Burned area: 52,462 acres (212 km^{2})
- Land use: Public rangeland and lava beds

Ignition
- Cause: Undetermined human cause

Map
- Location of fire in Oregon

The Cinder Butte Fire was a wildfire that burned over 52,000 acres (210 km^{2}) of Oregon rangeland during the summer of 2017. The fire began on 2 August 2017. It was determined to be human-caused since lightning was not present in the area prior to the initial fire report. The fire consumed rangeland vegetation and juniper woodlands in the area east of Glass Buttes in northern Lake County and then spread into northwestern Harney County. Most of the burned area was on public land administered by the Bureau of Land Management. Firefighters battled the blaze for over a week. At the peak of the firefighting effort, there were 496 firefighters working on the Cinder Butte Fire.

== Origin ==
In the early afternoon of 2 August 2017, a wildfire was reported in northeastern corner of Lake County, Oregon on land administered by the Bureau of Land Management. The fire's ignition point was along U.S. Route 20, approximately 60 miles (97 km) southeast of Bend. The bureau named it the Cinder Butte Fire.

At the time the fire started a combination of hot-dry weather and gusty winds created dangerous fire conditions across Central Oregon. As a result, shortly after it was reported the fire began to burn actively. Firefighters battled the blaze for over a week as the fire consumed rangeland and juniper woodlands east and then southeast of Glass Buttes.

== Chronology ==
On 2 August 2017, a fire was reported on public land about 10 miles (16 km) west of the small unincorporated gas-stop junction of Riley. Because of the extreme weather conditions the fire burned approximately 10,000 acres (40 km^{2}) during the afternoon and evening of the first day. It then exploded to over 50,000 acres (200 km^{2}) overnight, burning across the Lake County line into Harney County. The fire crews that initially responded to the fire worked all afternoon and throughout the night.

Those crews continued to work through the morning of 3 August and into the afternoon until relief crews arrived from Washington state later that day. In addition to firefighters, several helicopters were used to drop water on the fire along with four large air tankers and four smaller air tankers that dropped retardant throughout the day. Working together, the fire crews, helicopters, and aerial tankers stopped the fire from crossing U.S. Route 395. Fire crews built a fire line along the east side of the fire and began work on the west side fire line. By the end of the day, there were several hundred firefighters deployed on the fire. They were divided into day crews and night crews so the firefighting could go on 24 hours a day while allowing firefighters to get adequate rest between shifts.

Fire burning night of 2–3 August	Morning crew briefing on 4 August	Cinder Butte Fire on 4 August

Cooler temperatures overnight slowed the spread of the fire giving firefighters a chance to complete most of the planned fire lines. However, the hot-dry weather on 4 August kept the fire alive. During the day, crews focused on finishing rough-cut fire lines and building new lines on the steeper, rocky slopes along the west side of the fire. However, the fire was only 9 percent contained. Because of the continuing hot-dry weather, the fire risk was upgraded, prompting a request for additional firefighters and operating equipment. In addition, the new risk assessment triggered an order for a larger fire management team which was scheduled to arrive the following day. New mapping fixed the size of the fire at 52,223 acres (211.34 km^{2}).

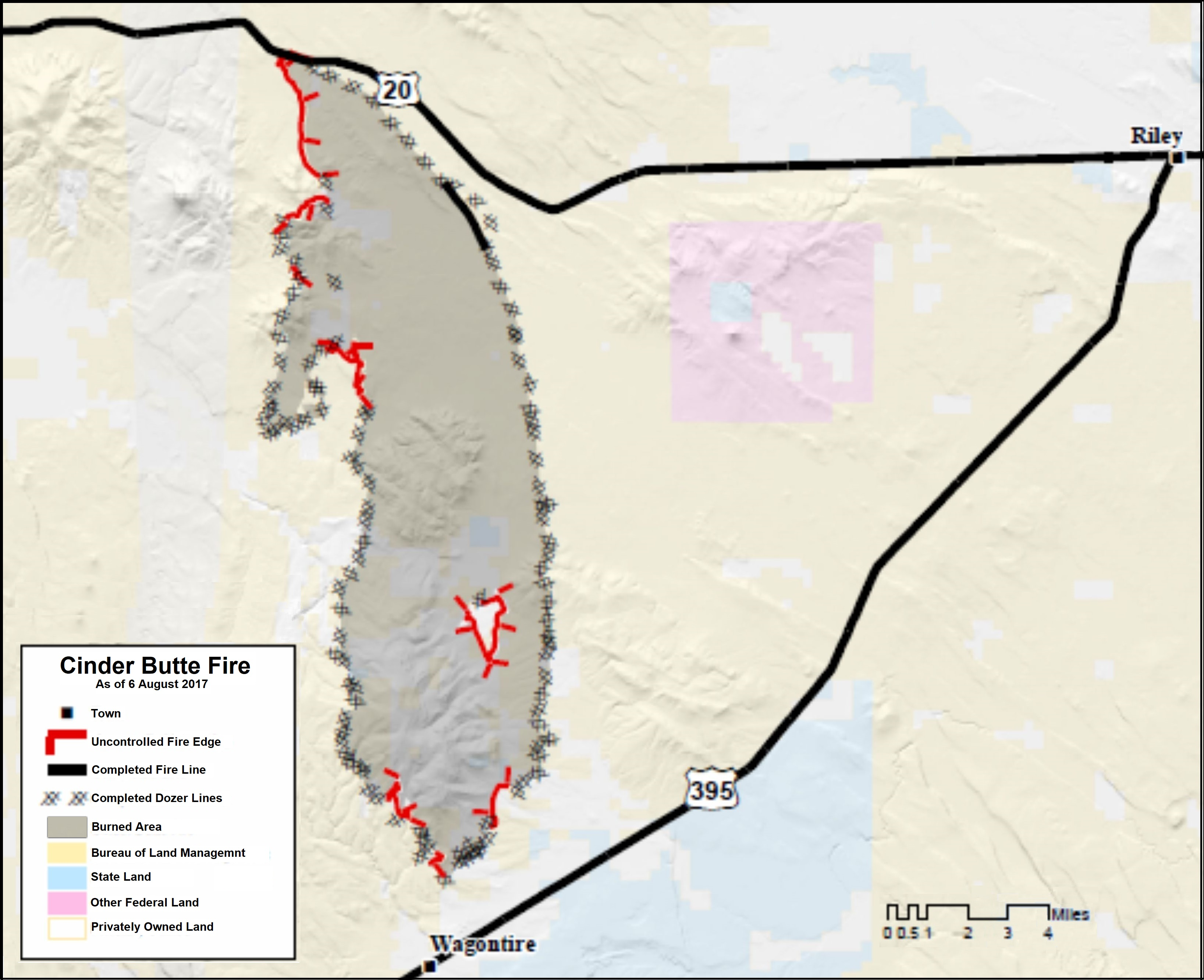
Cinder Butte Fire map as of 6 August

Over the weekend of 5 and 6 August, gusty winds made firefighting a challenge as the crews worked to expand fire lines. The firefighting efforts consisted of hand-cut fire lines and pumper truck crews spraying water on the flames along with retardant drops from the air. As additional firefighting resources arrived from stations throughout the Pacific Northwest and more heavy equipment became available, the fire lines were widened and extended all along the perimeter. While the fire threatened some important archaeological sites, the size of the fire did not grow much over the weekend. This was due to a shift in the wind that pushed the fire back into burned out areas, allowing firefighters to get in front of the fire and finish their lines. During this period, the number of firefighter on scene grew to over 400. The Bureau of Land Management estimated the fire was 60 percent contained.

On 7 August, the fire was initially reported to have grown to 52,531 acres (212.59 km^{2}). However, that was later revised 52,465 acres (212.32 km^{2}). While the fire burned close to the tiny unincorporated gas-stop of Wagontire, it was stopped before damaging any structures there. Some private grazing land was burned, but all the livestock in the area was moved out ahead of the fire. At the peak of the operation, there were 496 firefighters on-site along with 26 pumper trucks, 4 bulldozers, 11 water tenders, 2 helicopters, and a small spotter plane working on the fire. That night, containment reached 80 percent.

On 8 August, the Bureau of Land Management estimated the fire was 90 percent contained. Mop-up operations moved well inside the fire line perimeter. By the evening of 8 August, the number of firefighters on scene had been reduced to 376.

Mop-up operations continued on 9 August while additional crews were released for duty on other fires. Crews also began fire suppression damage repair including restoration of sage grouse habitat areas. While mop-up continued on 10 August, Bureau of Land Management officials declared the fire to be 100 percent contained. Over the next few days, the remaining outside crews were released while local fire crews made spot checks along the fire line.

== Effects ==
In the Bureau of Land Management's final update, the size of the Cinder Butte Fire was reported as 52,465 acres (212.32 km^{2}). Most of the burned area was United States Government land administered Bureau of Land Management; however, some private ranch land was also burned.

The Cinder Butte Fire burned rangeland and scrub woodlands east and southeast of Glass Buttes and north of Wagontire. The main vegetation burned by the fire was grass and sagebrush along with scattered areas of western juniper trees. No residences or commercial structures were lost; however, four ranch outbuildings were destroyed along with two long-abandoned homestead cabins.

While it was actively burning, the Cinder Butte Fire was the largest active fire in the state of Oregon. At its peak, there were 496 firefighters from the Bureau of Land Management, United States Forest Service, and several other agencies working on the fire. Equipment dispatched to the fire included pumper trucks, bulldozers, water tankers, helicopters, and air tankers.
