= Eagle Creek Fire =

Major 2017 wildfire in Columbia Gorge, Oregon

- Part of the 2017 Oregon wildfires
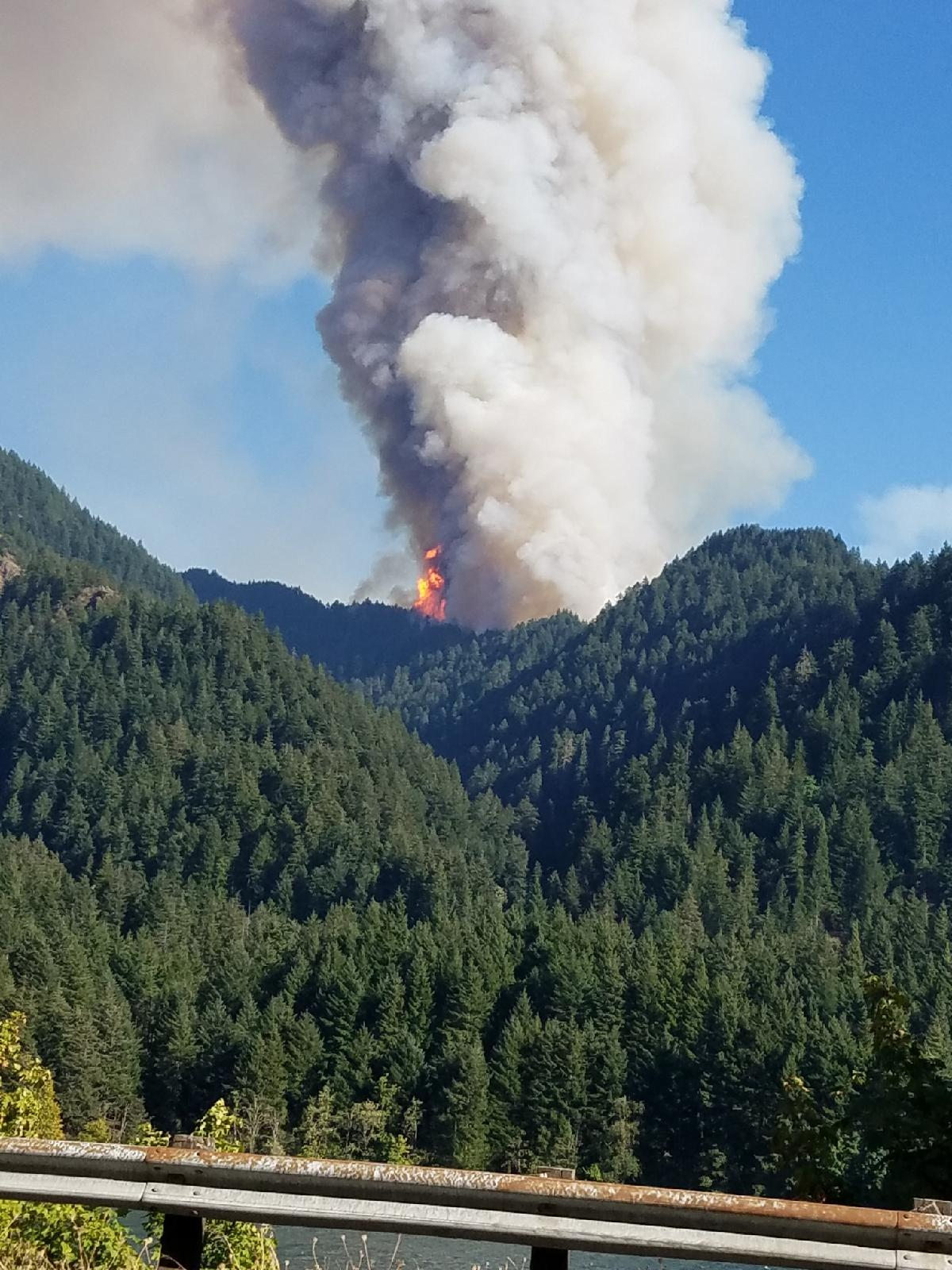
- The fire on September 2, 2017
- Date: September 2, 2017 – November 30, 2017 (embers still burning, but contained)
- Location: Cascade Locks, Oregon, United States
- Coordinates: 45.63°N 121.904°W

Statistics
- Burned area: 50,000 acres (202 km^{2})

Ignition
- Cause: Illegal use of fireworks
- Perpetrator: Teenage minor

Map
- Location of the fire in Oregon

The Eagle Creek Fire was a destructive wildfire in the Columbia River Gorge, largely in the U.S. state of Oregon, with smaller spot-fires in Washington. The fire was started on September 2, 2017, by a 15-year-old boy igniting fireworks during a burn ban. The fire burned 50,000 acres, and burned for three months, before being declared completely contained. As late as May 29, 2018, it was still found smoldering in some areas.

== Timeline ==
By September 28, 2017, the fire had consumed 48,831 acres (19,761 ha) and was 46% contained. In late October, fire growth was slowed by rain. On November 30, 2017, the fire was declared fully contained but not yet completely out.

In mid-September 2017, highway closures and local evacuations were gradually being lifted.

A six-mile stretch of the Historic Columbia River Highway between Bridal Veil and Ainsworth State Park, a section providing access to many popular scenic destinations such as Multnomah Falls, remained closed until November 2018. About 9,000 trees in danger of falling on the road were cut, and more than 3,000 feet of protective fencing was installed before the historic road was deemed safe for public travel, according to the Oregon Department of Transportation.

Several popular hiking trails were reopened to the public in November 2018, but as of May 2019, many trails heavily damaged by the fire remain closed, and officials with the U.S. Forest Service say there's no timeline for when some will reopen. "Some areas may stay closed for years," said Rachel Pawlitz, public information officer with the Columbia River Gorge National Scenic Area. Heavily damaged trails included the very popular Horsetail Falls, Oneonta Gorge, and Eagle Creek Trails, which have since reopened.

== Cause ==
On September 5, Oregon State Police announced that it had identified the person suspected of starting the wildfire, through the use of fireworks that were illegally set off, as a 15-year-old boy from Vancouver, Washington. A witness reported seeing a group of teenagers recording the fireworks being lit and thrown into Eagle Creek Canyon.

It was announced on September 8 that Oregon State Police had obtained cellphone video footage from one of the teenagers who had watched while a 15-year-old Vancouver boy threw a smoking firecracker, allegedly igniting the Eagle Creek Fire. Public Information Officer Capt. Bill Fugate says "the video will be released through the public records request process once the investigation is closed and the case is adjudicated, if charges are filed", reported Willamette Week.

The teen was sentenced in February 2018 to five years of probation and 1,920 hours of community service with the U.S. Forest Service. He also was ordered to write apology letters to 152 people trapped on the Eagle Creek trail because of the spreading flames, the city of Cascade Locks, the Forest Service, Oregon State Parks, the Oregon Department of Transportation, the Confederated Tribes of Warm Springs, the Columbia River Intertribal Fish Commission and many others.

On May 21, 2018, a judge ordered the 15-year old to pay more than $36 million in restitution, which includes more than $21 million on behalf of the U.S. Forest Service, $12.5 million to the Oregon Department of Transportation, more than $1.6 million to the Oregon State Fire Marshal, more than $1 million to Union Pacific Railroad and varying amounts to Oregon State Parks, Allstate Insurance and a woman who lost her home in the fire. The judge ruled the teenager could set up a payment plan, which could be halted without paying the fine in full after 10 years, as long as he completed his five years of probation and did not commit any other crimes.

== Events ==
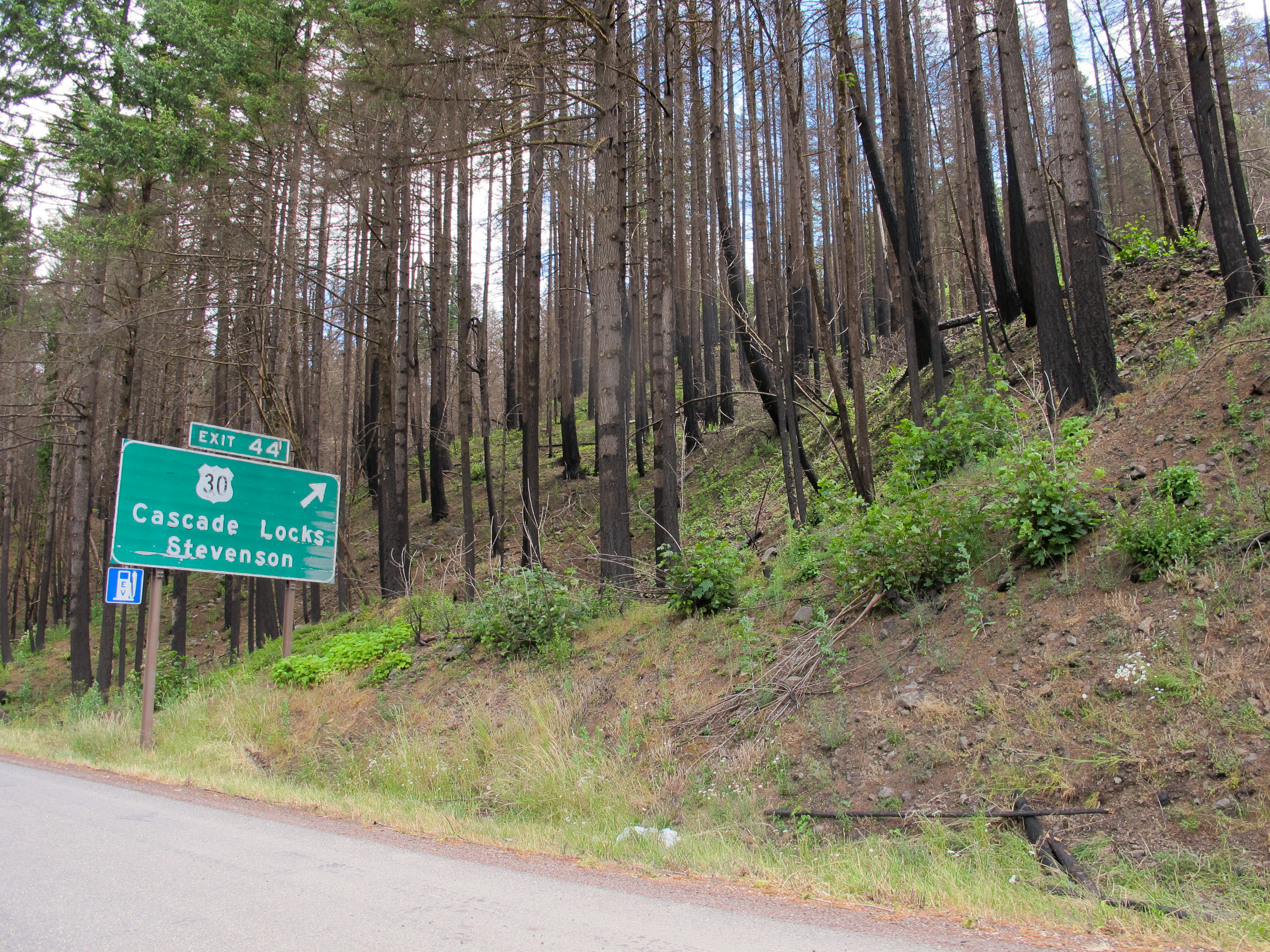
Trees along Interstate 84, near Cascade Locks, show burnt bark in June 2018.

The Eagle Creek Fire was reported on September 2 at 4:00 p.m. in the Columbia River Gorge. By the morning of September 3, the fire had grown to 3,000 acres (1,200 ha). On September 5, the fire hopped over the Columbia River into Washington state, near Archer Mountain. The fire trapped 153 hikers and forced them to stay overnight six miles up the trail, trapped on the other side by the Indian Creek Fire. The first rescuer, a Forest Service ranger named Sharon, reached the hikers around 10 p.m. An attempt to drop supplies to the hikers, and to airlift out the youngest children, was aborted because the narrow terrain and night made the maneuver too hazardous. The hikers—who generally had been on a hot summer day hike—huddled together and tried to sleep on the bare ground. Several additional staff from the Forest Service and the Hood River Crag Rats arrived overnight with space blankets and some provisions. The next morning, Crag Rats, Pacific Northwest Search and Rescue, along with Mountain Wave Search and Rescue, escorted the hikers out to Wahtum Lake and bussed them back to the Eagle Creek Trailhead.

The community of Cascade Locks, Oregon was the first to experience mandatory evacuations, with 283 structures, including 15 businesses, being threatened by the fire. Salmon hatcheries at Cascade Locks were forced to release 600,000 fish six months earlier than expected. The fire also threatened historic structures in the Eagle Creek Day Use Area, specifically those built by the Civilian Conservation Corps in the 1930s. The fire also threatened the Multnomah Falls Lodge, which was saved by water tenders.

As of September 27, the Eagle Creek Fire had burned 48,665 acres (197 km^{2}) and was 46% contained. Rainfall during previous days had significantly contained and newly downgraded the fire. The Incident Command Post was relocated from Hood River County Fairgrounds to the Best Western Columbia River Inn in Cascade Locks.

=== Merge of Eagle Creek and Indian Creek Fires ===
In the early hours of September 6, the Eagle Creek Fire merged with the Indian Creek Fire. Fire officials estimated that, together, over 31,000 acres were actively burning.

The Office of the Oregon State Fire Marshal issued the following statement:

The gorge still looks like the gorge... It's not a wasteland. It's not a blackened, destroyed no-man's land. There are trees everywhere and they look good... That's not to say there isn't damage to some of those trees... But, it's still a beautiful drive through there and it still looks good.

— Lt. Damon Simmons, Spokesperson, Oregon State Fire Marshal, OregonLive.com

The following day, September 7, circumstances led Simmons to update his statement to "There is significant damage to the trails... it's going to take a while for them to recover."

=== Air quality downgrades ===
Westward winds blew smoke and up to one inch of ash on the Portland metro area during 4 and 5 September. Air quality was officially reduced to an "unhealthy" rating due to smoke and falling ash, forcing many schools to close or cancel outdoor activities.

On Friday, September 15, smoky conditions resumed throughout the Portland Metro area, accompanied by far less falling ash than previously, but downgrading air quality to an "unhealthy" rating again on Saturday, 16 September. Shifting wind conditions and subsequent rain on Sunday, September 17 cleared skies and aided in fire containment. Many schools were also affected by smoke, causing children to miss school on many occasions.

== Evacuations and closures ==
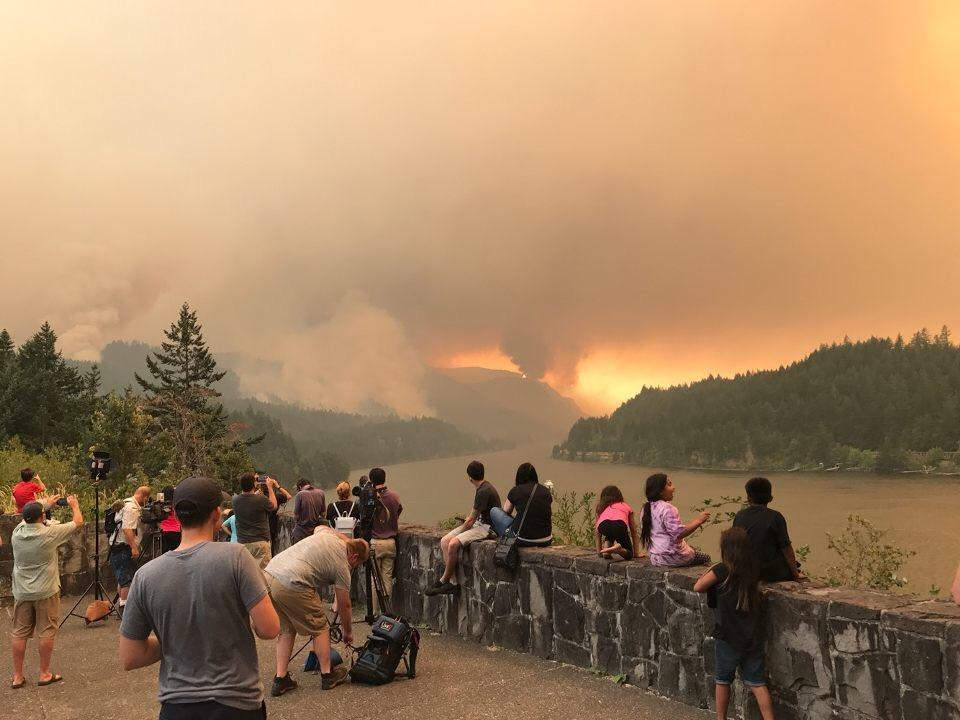
Onlookers watching the fire from the Columbia River Gorge, September 4

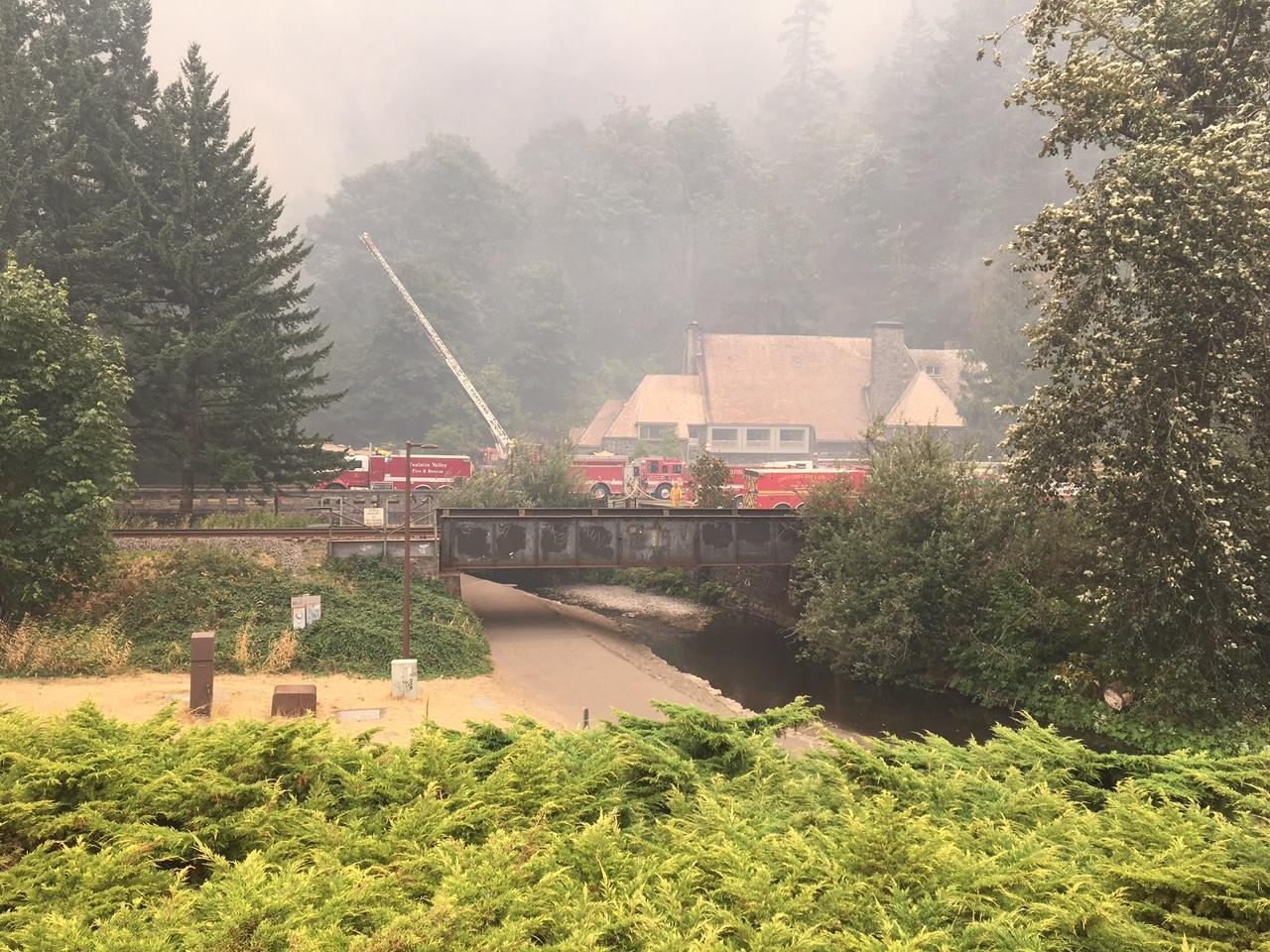
Multnomah Falls Lodge surrounded by smoke, September 5

Cascade Locks, Oregon was the first area of mandatory evacuation. As of September 5, a number of communities in the area were added to mandatory evacuation. In Multnomah County, mandatory evacuation orders were in place for Larch Mountain, and the communities of Latourell, Bridal Veil, Dodson, Warrendale, and East Corbett. "Get Set" evacuations were in place for Corbett and Springdale. An evacuation shelter was established at Mt. Hood Community College.

The Columbia River itself was also closed to all marine traffic for 20 miles, from mile marker 126 to 146. The I-84 corridor from Troutdale, Oregon to Hood River, Oregon, continued to be an active evacuation zone as of September 12.

"Eastbound I-84 will remain closed at least another week for rock and tree removal. However, ODOT plans to open the Westbound lanes of I-84 first. Meanwhile, the Historic Columbia River Highway remains closed with no schedule to reopen. Rocks and trees continue to fall and ODOT is working to keep the highway available for firefighters. ODOT has removed about 2,000 trees that were in danger of falling onto I-84, but there are about 1,500 trees that crews still need to remove. ODOT hopes to complete that tree removal by early next week. The biggest danger to drivers is the threat of falling rocks, most of them around the Toothrock Tunnel. The work to make this area safe is slow. ODOT has inspected 70 bridges and culverts along I-84 and found minimal damage."

A total of 400 residences were under mandatory evacuation notices. In Hood River County, mandatory evacuations are in place for all areas south of Interstate 84 in Cascade Locks. The rest of Cascade Locks was at "Get Set" evacuation level on September 5. Meanwhile, in Skamania County, Washington, there were mandatory evacuations for Archer Mountain Road, Smith Cripe and Deville Road. Mabee Mines Road was also at a "Get Set" evacuation level at that time.

As of September 9, 2017, the Oregon State Fire Marshal (OSFM) task force was on alert for potential evacuation of Lost Lake and Mitchell Point.

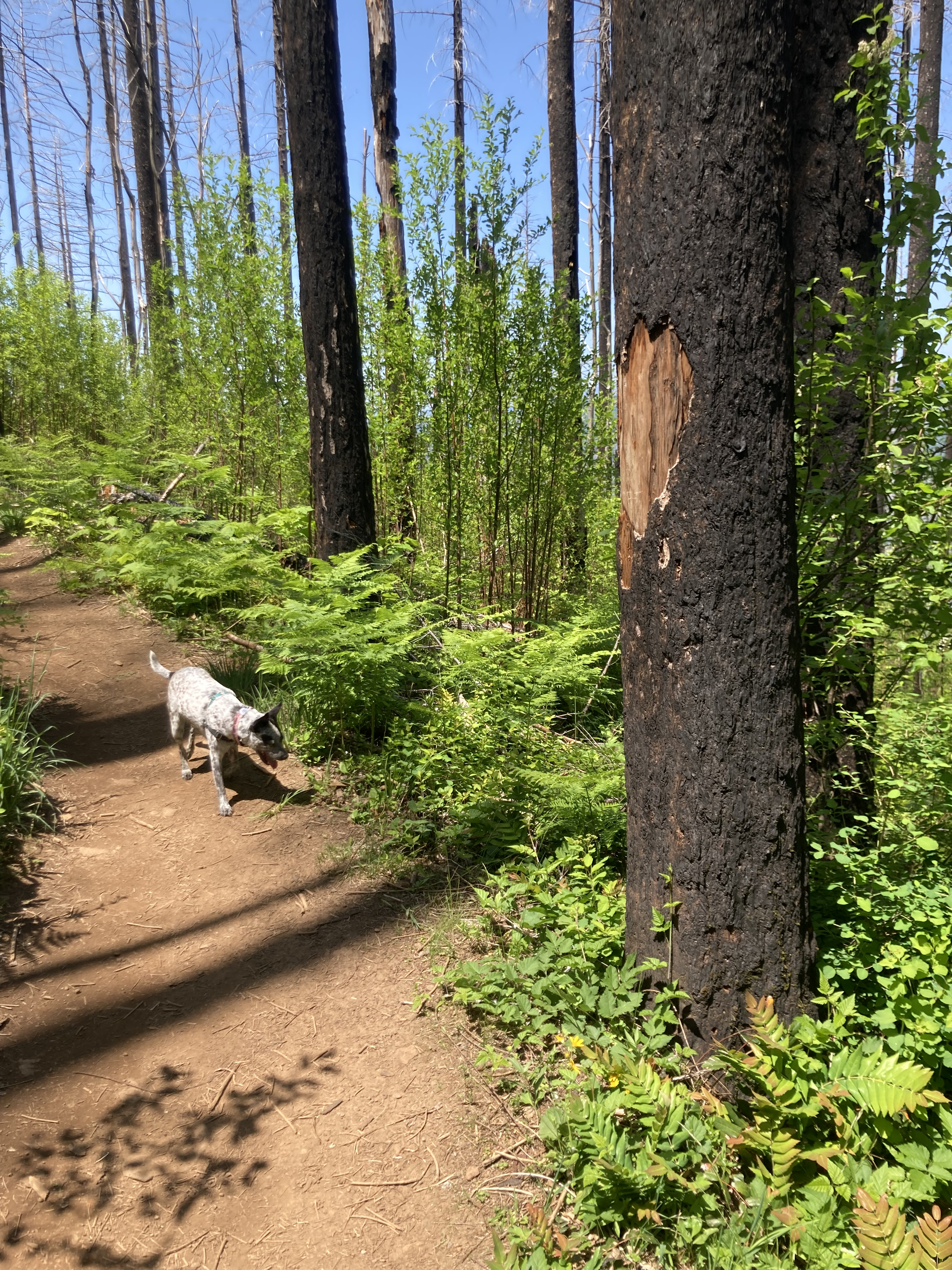
A dog walks by trees damaged by the Eagle Creek Fire in May 2023

In mid-September 2017, highway closures and local evacuations were gradually being lifted.[9]

A six-mile stretch of the Historic Columbia River Highway between Bridal Veil and Ainsworth State Park, a section providing access to many popular scenic destinations such as Multnomah Falls, remained closed until November 2018. About 9,000 trees in danger of falling on the road were cut, and more than 3,000 feet of protective fencing was installed before the historic road was deemed safe for public travel, according to the Oregon Department of Transportation.

Several popular hiking trails were reopened to the public in November 2018, but as of May 2019, many trails heavily damaged by the fire remain closed, and officials with the U.S. Forest Service say there's no timeline for when some will reopen. "Some areas may stay closed for years," said Rachel Pawlitz, public information officer with the Columbia River Gorge National Scenic Area. These heavily damaged trails include the very popular Horsetail Falls, Wahclella Falls, Oneonta Gorge, and Eagle Creek Trails, among others.

== Containment ==
On November 3, 2017, the U.S. Forest Service listed an "Estimated Containment Date" for the Eagle Creek Fire of November 30. On November 30, 2017, the fire was declared 100 percent contained after burning 50,000 acres. However, it was not completely out.

By September 22, 2018, the fire was considered extinguished, though closures in the area continued.
