= Jack Fire =

2021 wildfire in Oregon

- Part of the 2021 Oregon wildfires
- Date: June 16, 2021 – October 12, 2021
- Location: Umpqua National Forest, Glide, Oregon
- Coordinates: 43.322°N 122.686°W

Statistics
- Burned area: 24,167 acres 98 km^{2}; 9,780 ha

Impacts
- Structures destroyed: 0
- Cost: $72,000,000

Ignition
- Cause: Human Activity

Map
- Location of Jack Fire in Western Oregon

The Jack Fire is a large wildfire that started near Umpqua National Forest, Glide, Oregon on June 16, 2021 and was put out on October 12, 2021. It burned approximately 21,467 acres (8,687 ha). It took a significant effort to contain due to challenging terrain and dry conditions, but firefighters successfully brought it under control.

== Events ==
=== July ===
The Jack Fire was first reported on July 5, 2021 at around 2:00 pm PDT near Glide, Oregon.

=== Cause ===
The cause of the fire is unknown. It was stated that it may be due to human activity, though the specific details have not been fully disclosed as of 2026. Like many wildfires in the region, it was probably affected by dry weather conditions, high temperatures, and dense vegetation, which made it difficult to control and contributed to its rapid spread. The ongoing drought and climate conditions have heightened fire risks in the area

=== Containment ===
The fire was fully contained and put out on October 12, 2021.

== Recovery efforts ==
After the fire, U.S. Forest Service assessments determined that it burned so hot in many areas that natural forest regeneration would be unlikely without replanting by hand. Therefore, the National Forest Foundation, (NFF) is currently working to bring the forest back, in addition to capitalizing on a unique opportunity to revitalize native oak habitat.

=== Recovering White Oak Habitat ===
==== Background context ====
Before European settlement, the Umpqua Basin was covered in upland prairies, with large oak trees and patches of scattered oak woodlands. This oak savanna ecosystem was maintained by the Indigenous Peoples through regular low-intensity fires and provided abundant resources to support human life. It is the most biodiverse terrestrial ecosystem in the region and is used by more than 200 species of wildlife, including 7 federally listed, such as the streaked horned lark. Off land, the oak ecosystem supports healthy watershed function, creating aquatic havens for native fish, such as salmon and steelhead.

In recent years, Oregon's oak habitats have declined to less than 5-15% of their historic range. This has happened - due to factors like the loss of low-intensity fires, habitat fragmentation, and more frequent severe fires like the Jack Fire and the Rough Patch fire – has alarmed scientists concerned about conserving white oak diversity for future restoration. Therefore, the recovery has begun to protect the white oak diversity and conservation

==== Process ====
To support white oak diversity and conservation, some of the oak seedlings that are planted on the burn scar will establish an oak acorn orchard to supply seed for future reforestation on Umpqua National Forest. Selected seedlings are sourced from acorns throughout the Oregon white oak range and grown at a local Forest Service genetics research center, where scientists study the genetic diversity of white oak. The orchard is currently serving as a gene conservation site, protecting genetic diversity for the future of this important species.
