= Whitewater Fire =

2017 wildfire in the U.S. state of Oregon

- Part of the 2017 Oregon wildfires
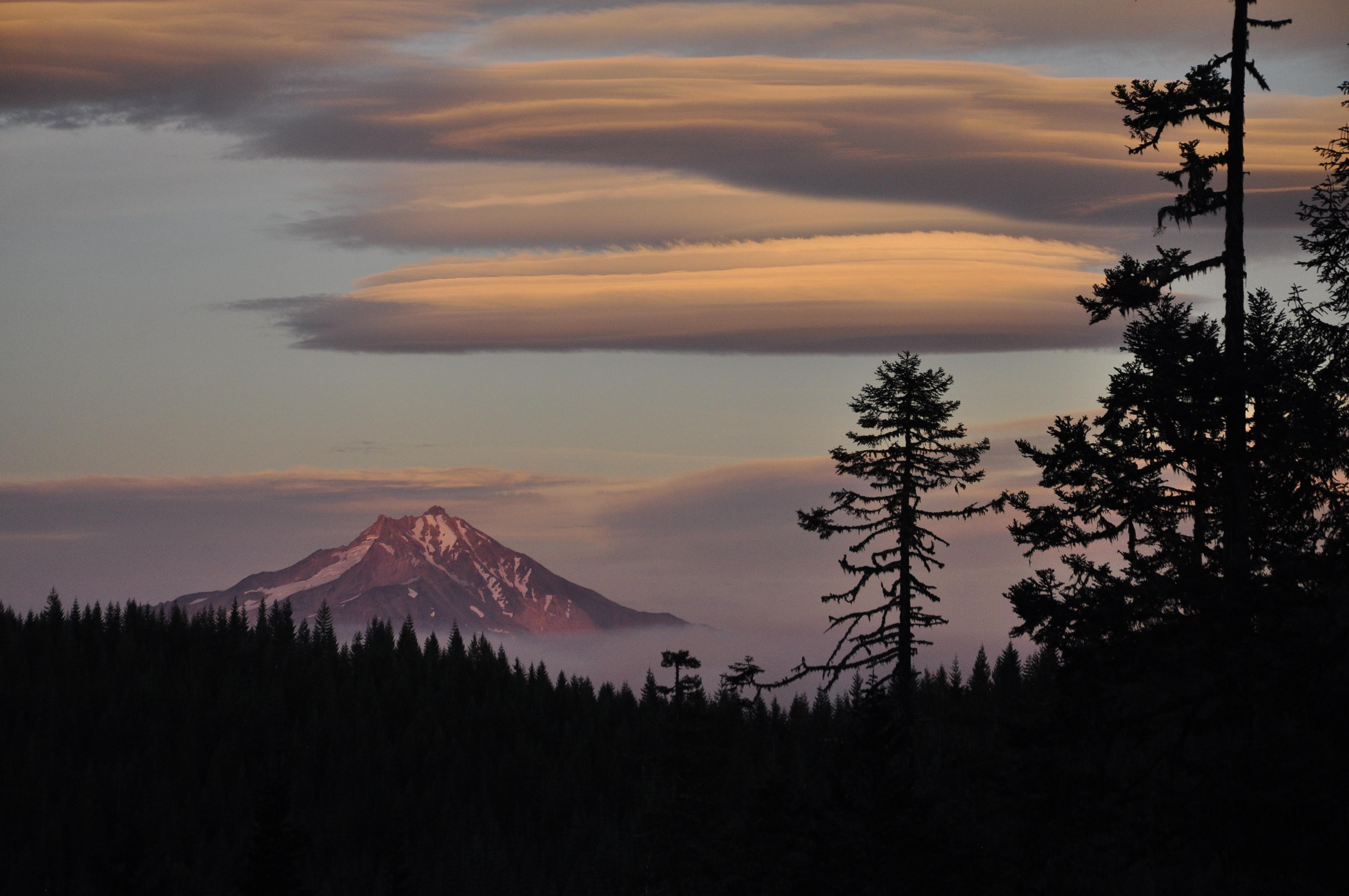
- Smoke from Whitewater Fire around Mt. Jefferson in August 2017
- Date: July 23, 2017 –
- Location: Mount Jefferson Wilderness, Oregon, United States
- Coordinates: 44.708°N 121.856°W

Statistics
- Burned area: 11,493 acres (47 km^{2})

Ignition
- Cause: Lightning

Map
- Location of fire in Oregon.

The Whitewater Fire was a wildfire in and near the Mount Jefferson Wilderness, approximately 13 miles east of Detroit, Oregon, United States. The fire, which was caused by a lightning strike and first reported on July 23, 2017, has burned approximately 14,500 acres (59 km^{2}) and is currently no longer active. It is one of eight fires to burn in Willamette National Forest in the Fall of 2017.

== Events ==
The Whitewater Fire was started by a lightning strike in the Mount Jefferson Wilderness near the Whitewater Creek. The fire was first reported on July 23, 2017, at 5:35 PM by a commercial airplane that spotted the smoke. By the next day, the fire had grown to 67 acres (27 ha) due to high winds, low humidity and high temperatures. The US Forest Service closed numerous trails in response to the fire's growth, including portions of Whitewater, Cheat Creek, Triangulation and Crag trails. Two days later, on July 25, a forest service road off of Highway 20 was closed. The fire grew somewhat, but calm weather kept it under 100 acres and the Hoodoo ski area became an Incident Command Post.

By August 1, the fire had grown to 167 acres (1 km^{2}) and 11-miles of the Pacific Crest Trail and South Breitenbusch Trail were closed due to concerns with the fire's growth due to hot and dry weather. Due to the heavy fuels and hot, dry weather the fire grew to 1,500 acres (6 km^{2}) overnight and was 10% contained. Air resources began to be utilized due to the growth. By August 3, the Whitewater Fire expanded north and south to 4,579 acres (19 km^{2}) acres, and reaching Woodpecker and Breitenbush creeks. Fire crews began digging firelines and clearing roadside vegetation. The air quality in nearby Detroit declined rapidly, with ash falling from the sky. Aircraft were unable to provide air support due to low visibility. On August 5, Super Scoopers began collecting water from Detroit Lake and select trailheads were closed in Willamette National Forest and Deschutes National Forest. By mid-August, the Little Devil Fire started about two miles northwest of the Whitewater Fire.

By mid-August, the Little Devil Fire started about two miles northwest of the Whitewater Fire. Air quality still remained poor in Detroit and declined in Breitenbush. The final Willamette National Forest update on the Whitewater Fire was on September 26, 2017. The fire had burned 11,493 acres (47 km^{2}) and was 64% contained. Forest Service Road 45 reopened to traffic with all other trail and road closures remaining in place. By the end of October, the Whitewater Fire had grown to 14,463 acres (59 km^{2}).
