= Jones Fire =

2017 wildfire in Oregon

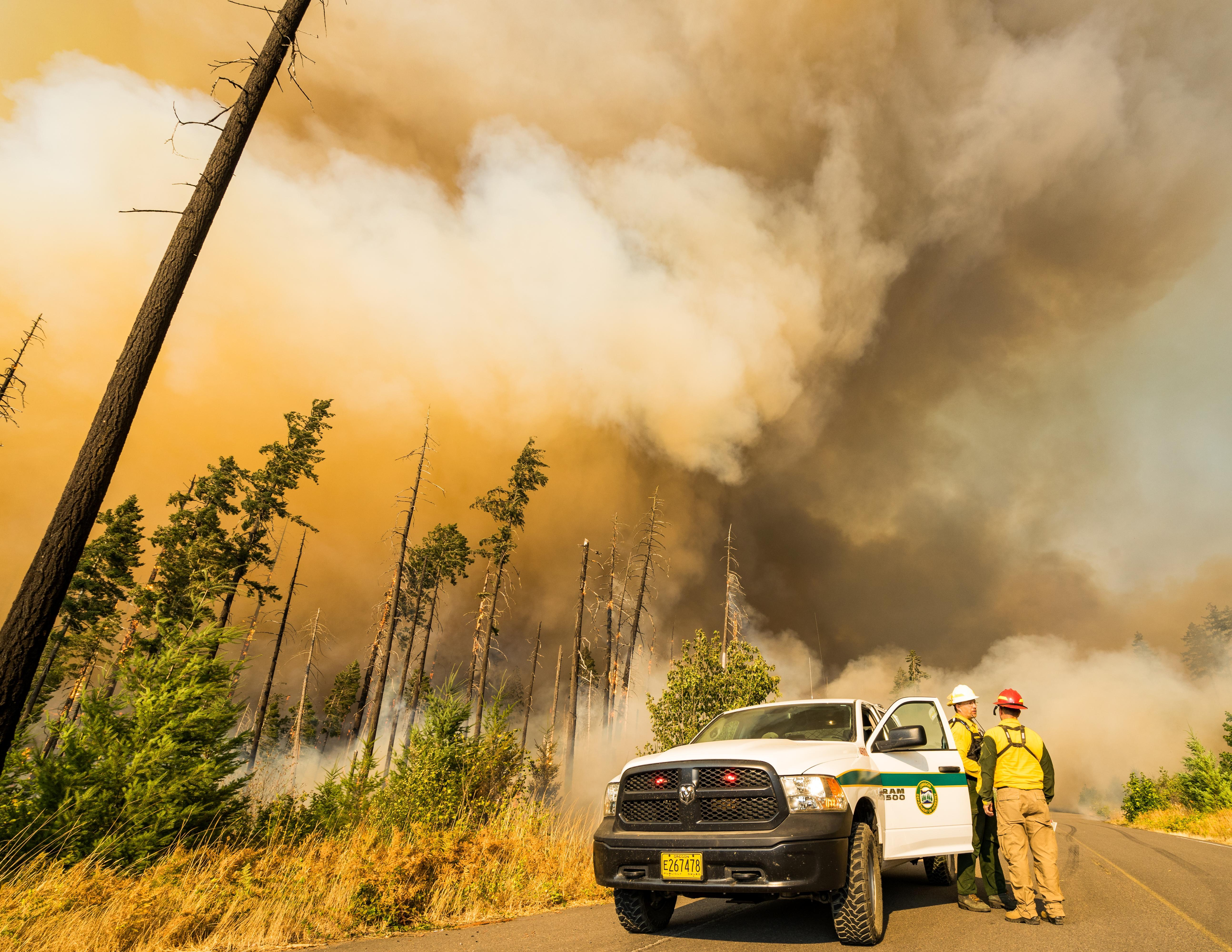
- Fire personnel confer under a billowing column of smoke from the Jones Fire, August 2017
- Date: August 10, 2017 – October 14, 2017
- Location: Willamette National Forest, Oregon, United States
- Coordinates: 44.003°N 122.575°W

Statistics
- Burned area: 10,114 acres (41 km^{2})

Impacts
- Injuries: 5

Ignition
- Cause: Lightning

Map
- Location of fire in Oregon.

The Jones Fire was a wildfire in the Willamette National Forest, approximately 10 miles northeast of Lowell, in Oregon in the United States. The fire, which was first reported on August 10, 2017, burned a total of 10,114 acres (41 km^{2}) and was started by lightning. The fire threatened the community of Lowell and disrupted various activities in the park, including the start of deer hunting season.

== Events ==
=== August ===
The Jones Fire was reported on August 10, 2017, at approximately 6:51 PM, in the Willamette National Forest, 10 miles northeast of Lowell, Oregon. The fire was started by a lightning strike, fueled by timber and grass. Three days later, on August 13, six campgrounds, two trails, two park areas, and 10 forest service roads were closed. By August 16, the fire was 5% contained and the fire had burned 2,581 acres (10 km^{2}). The fire began burning in areas of the 2003 Clark Fire, creating dangerous conditions for firefighters due to snags. Additionally, firefighters were challenged by steep terrain, poor roads, and limited accessibility to fire lines. Dozers and hand crews completed control lines in the south on August 15. That evening, a public meeting was held in Lowell regarding the fire. On August 20, five people were reported injured by the US Forest Service without explanation of their injuries.

By August 21, the fire had reached 5,354 acres (22 km^{2}) and was 15% contained. The prior day, the fire had burned through Bedrock Campground, however it did not damage any of the facilities. By August 23, a third trail, four more roads, and two additional park areas were closed.

=== September ===
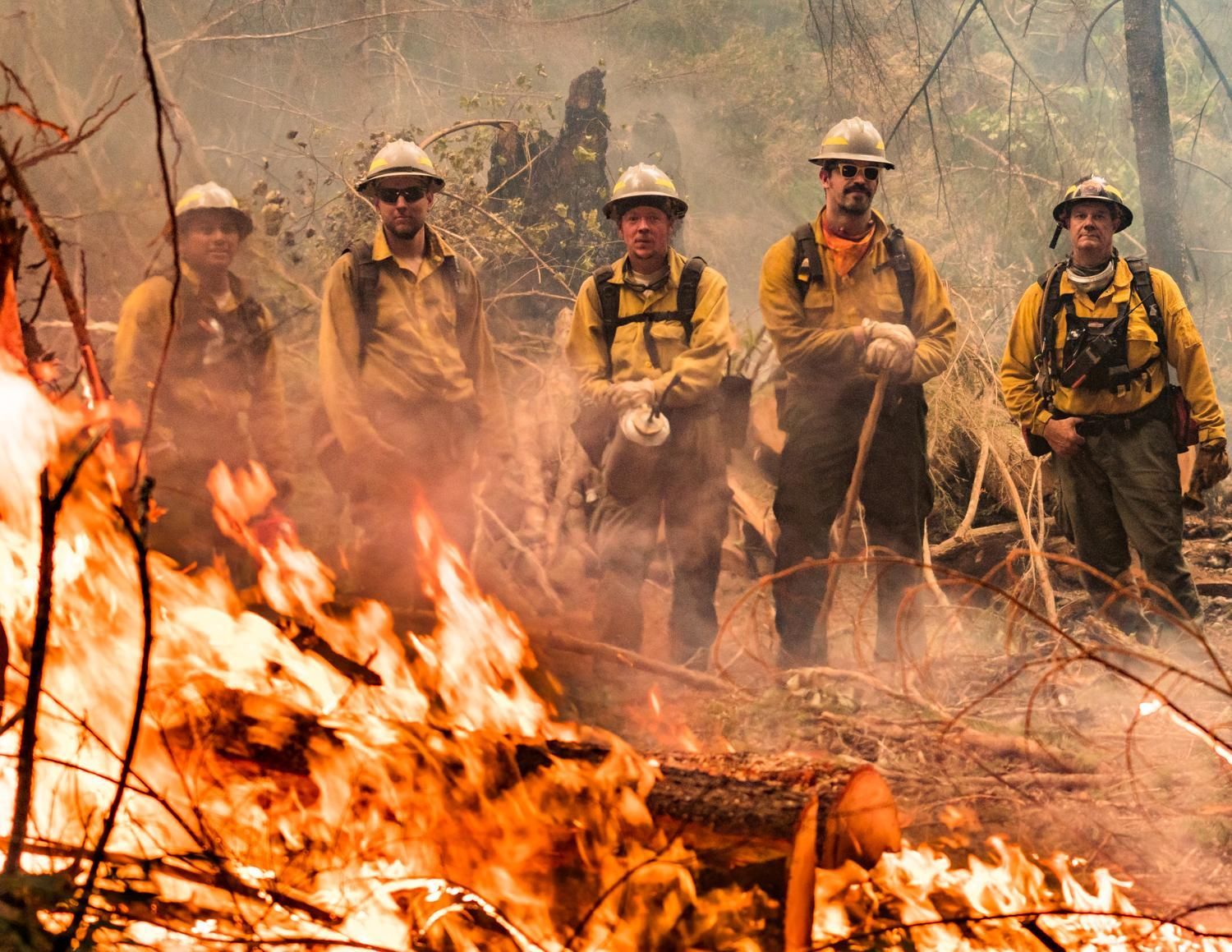
A fire crew poses during strategic fire operations to prevent the Jones Fire from spreading.

By September 1, the fire had grown to 7,730 acres (31 km^{2}) and was 50% contained. Crews engaged in single tree and small group torching. They controlled a 25-acre spot fire outside the containment line. Additionally, a rock slide temporary closed a fire service at the top of the fire. A red flag warning was put in place. Within a week, by September 7, the fire surpassed 8,000 acres (32 km^{2}). The Jones Fire Camp, located in Lowell State Park, was relocated to Dexter State Recreation Site, closing the site to visitors.

Despite a storm front bringing cool and wet conditions, the fire expanded to over 10,000 acres (40 km^{2}) by the morning of September 18 and two more trailheads were closed. Another fire, the Kelsey Fire, was started by a lightning strike near the Jones Fire, growing to 441 acres (2 km^{2}). By the next day, more park areas and roads were closed. Heavy rains continued through mid-September, creating dangerous conditions for fire crews. The weather created slippery, impassible roads, more danger from weakened fire damaged trees, and hiking difficulties. Towards the end of the month, fire suppression began, including chipping roadside material, building waterbars, and removing hazard trees.

=== October ===
By October 6, the fire was at 91% containment and fire suppression was the full focus of fire crews. Many recreation sites, trails, and trailheads were reopened. The US Forest Service stopped reporting on the fire.
