= High Cascades Complex fires =

Series of forest fires in Oregon

High Cascades Complex
- Part of the 2017 Oregon wildfires
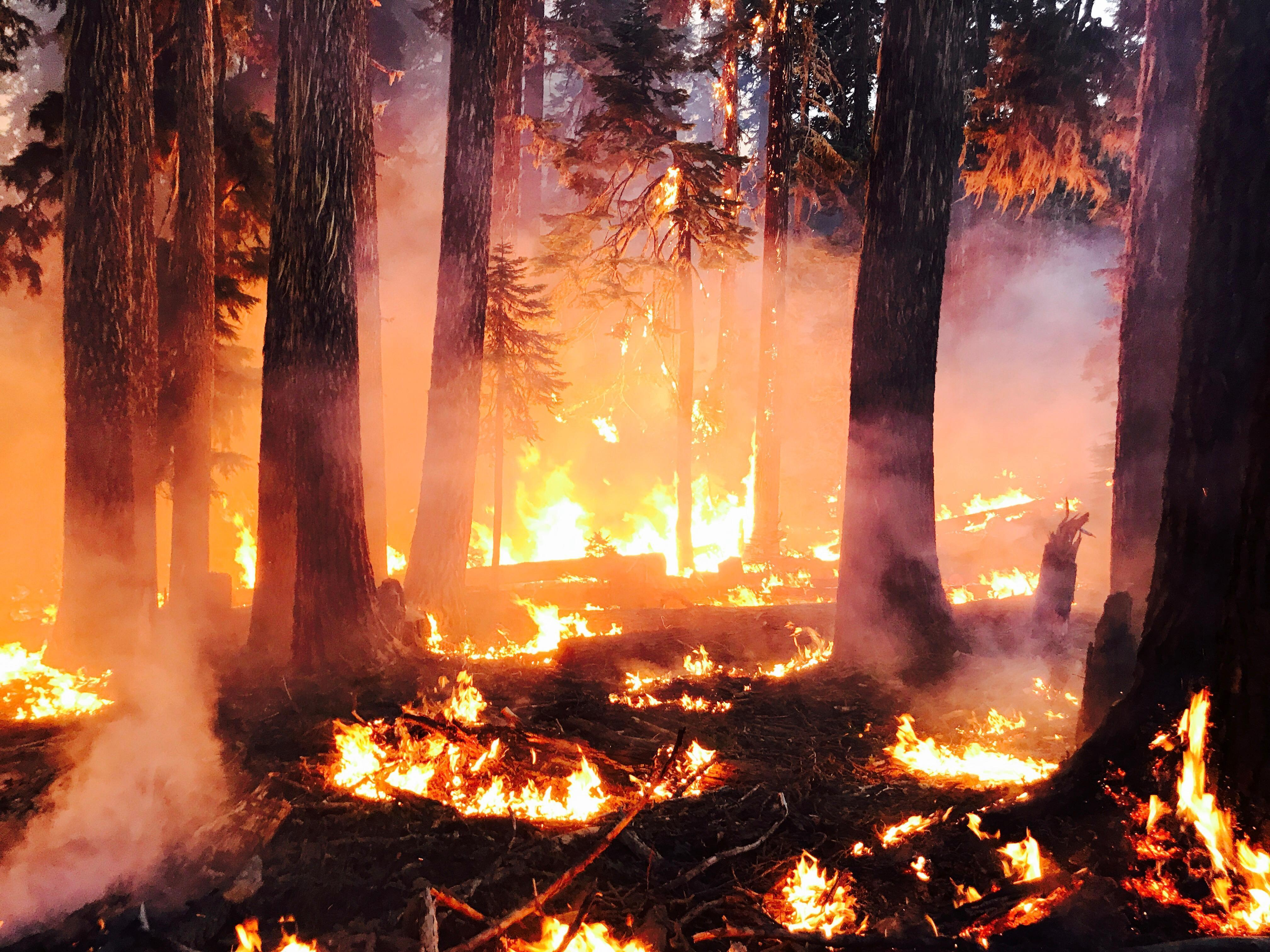
- Blanket Creek Fire on August 14, 2017
- Date: July 26, 2017 –
- Location: Crater Lake National Park, Rogue River – Siskiyou National Forest, Umpqua National Forest, Fremont–Winema National Forest in Oregon, United States
- Coordinates: 42.935°N 122.407°W

Statistics
- Burned area: 72,309 acres (293 km^{2})

Impacts
- Structures destroyed: 1

Ignition
- Cause: Lightning

Map
- Location of fire in Oregon.

The High Cascades Complex was a group of 20 fires burning in four protected areas in Oregon, in the United States, specifically: Crater Lake National Park, Rogue River – Siskiyou National Forest, Umpqua National Forest, and Fremont–Winema National Forest. The first fire in the complex, the Blanket Creek Fire, was started by a lightning strike on July 29, 2017. In total, the fires have burned 72,309 acres (293 km^{2}) and are 28% contained. The fires are directly impacting the communities of Prospect, Union Creek and Diamond Lake, park headquarters, old growth forests that house endangered species like the spotted owl and volcanic features.

== Events ==
The first fire, the Blanket Creek Fire, was started on July 26 by a lightning strike in the Rogue River – Siskiyou National Forest. Upon examination on August 14, the Blanket Creek Fire had grown to 5,223 acres (21 km^{2}), burning approximately seven miles east of Prospect, Oregon. Water from Lost Creek Lake was used to help cull the fire. On July 29, the Spruce Lake Fire, triggered by a lightning strike, started on the west side of Crater Lake National Park, totaling 4,885 acres (20 km^{2}) by August 14. Over the course of the next few weeks, into August, more fires started due to lightning strikes, including the Broken Lookout Fire, Round Top and Needle Fires, and Butte and Silent Fires, all 25 acres (0 km^{2}) or smaller as of August 14. At this time, sections of the Pacific Crest Trail, among other Crater Lake National Park trails, were closed.

On August 15, incident meteorologists released weather balloons to examine current and upcoming weather conditions. That day, another fire started, the Sherwood Fire (formerly known as the Roseburg Fire), burning just west of Diamond Lake. However, the Round Top and Needle Fires and Butte and Silent Fires had both been 100% contained. The following day, August 16, 150 Oregon National Guard members arrived to provide support. By August 23, the Blanket Fire, burning at 5,889 acres (24 km^{2}), had jumped the Pacific Crest Trail into the Sky Lakes Wilderness. Spruce Lake Fire remained at 61% containment, Sherwood Fire at 80% containment and Broken Lookout Fire was at zero containment.

By August 25, fire crews expressed concern about hunters and huckleberry pickers in the area and areas of the Fremont-Winema National Forest were closed, including roads and trails. The next day, three more fires were added to the High Cascades Complex: Paradise Fire, Pup Fire and Windy Gap Fire. Additionally, the Blanket Fire jumped to 8,176 acres (33 km^{2}). Additionally, on August 26, Umpqua National Forest announced road and trail closures. On August 27, the Sherwood Fire was 100% contained.

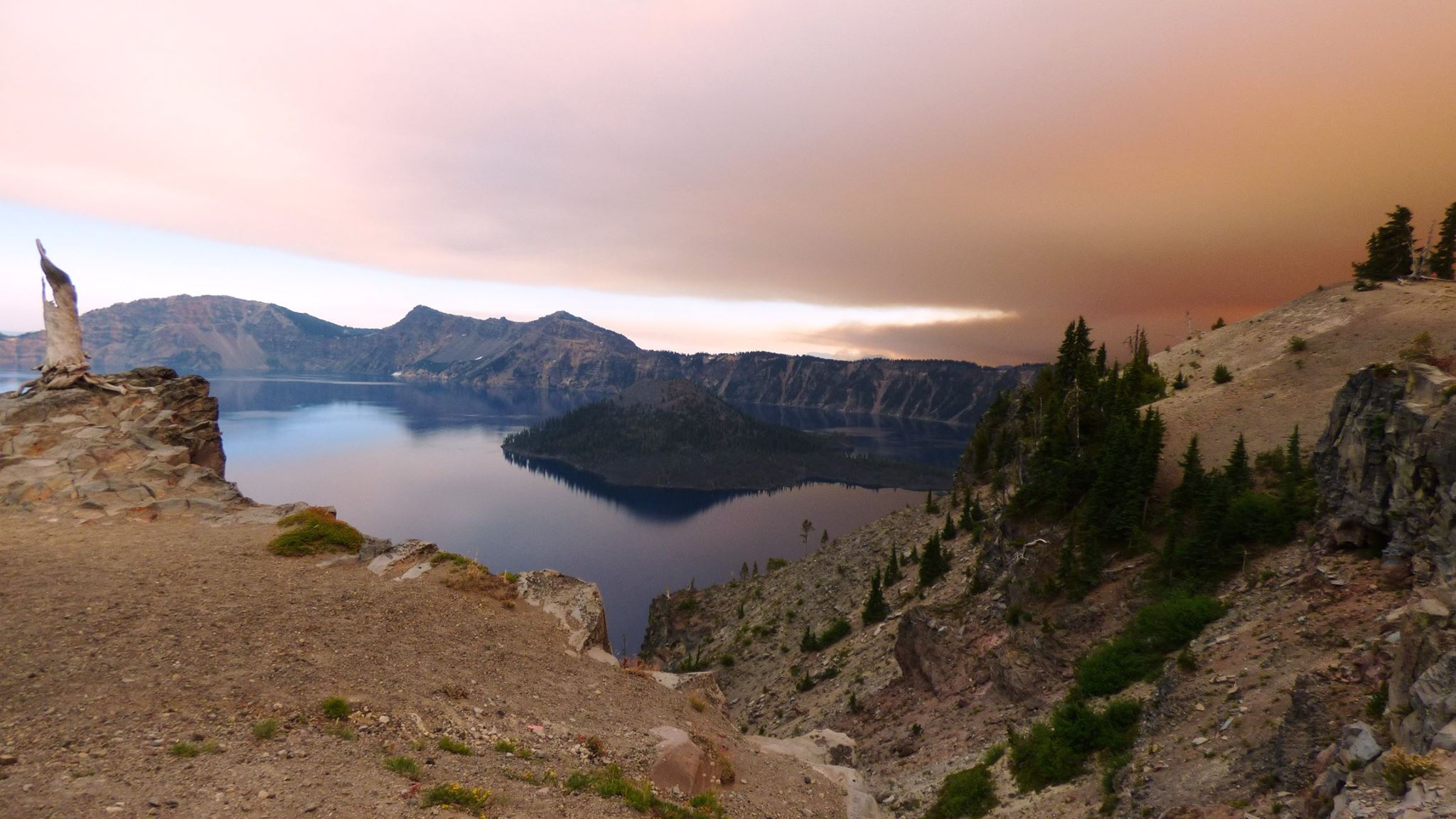
Smoke from the Blanket Creek Fire on September 1, 2017

The Blanket Fire grew dramatically over the course of the next few weeks, totaling 11,895 acres (48 km^{2}) by August 30. Crews created a defensible space around the Crater Lake National Park village of Mazama, to protect park buildings. The next day, additional areas of the Rogue-River Siskiyou National Forest were closed and as of September 1, additional closures were in place for Fremont-Winema National Forest, including Sky Lakes Wilderness. On September 5, the north entrance to Crater Lake National Park was closed to allow fire crews access to the Spruce Lake Fire and all access to Rogue-Umpqua Divide Wilderness was halted.

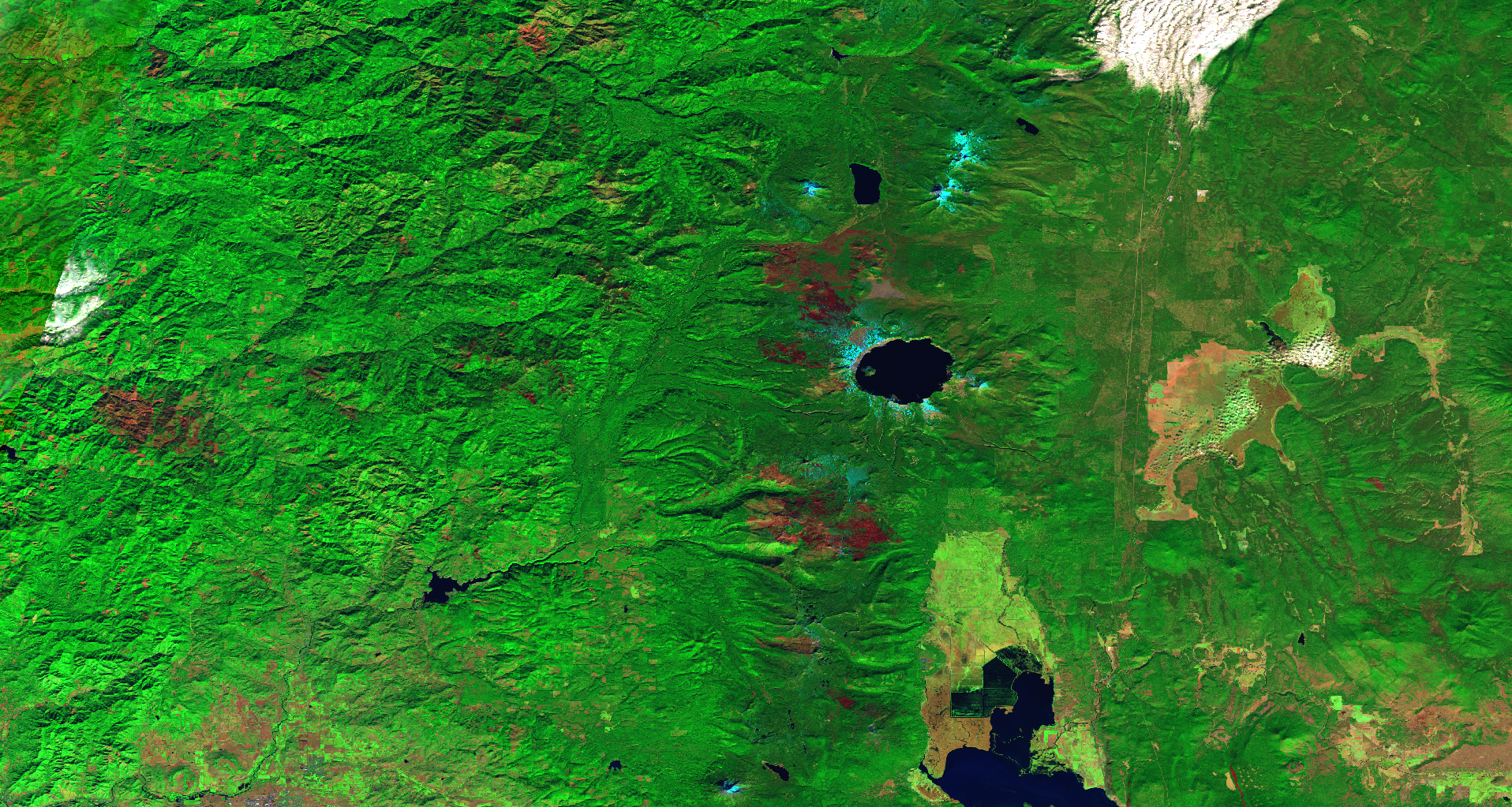
High Cascades Complex, Landsat 8, bands 758, false color infrared image, acquired October 27, 2017, data source https://earthexplorer.usgs.gov/

By September 9, the fires were split into two zones: the West Zone comprising the Broken Lookout and Pup Fire and the East Zone comprising the Spruce Lake, Blanket Creek, and North Pelican Fires. Resources were put into protecting the community of Union Creek from the Broken Lookout Fire.

As of September 11, the complex had burned a total of 70,654 acres (286 km^{2}). The east zone, comprising the Blanket Creek Fire, Spruce Lake Fire, and North Pelican Fire, is 20% contained and has burned 48,411 acres (196 km^{2}). The east zone had little activity by the next day, with protection strategies successfully protecting Hershberger Lookout from the Pup Fire and continued monitoring taking place regarding the Broken Lookout Fire's movement towards Union Creek. By the end of the day, a new fire had started at the southern border of the Rogue River-Siskiyou National Forest and crews were moved to fight the new start, leaving the Broken Lookout and Pup Fires to be handled by aerial resources.

== Closures and evacuations ==
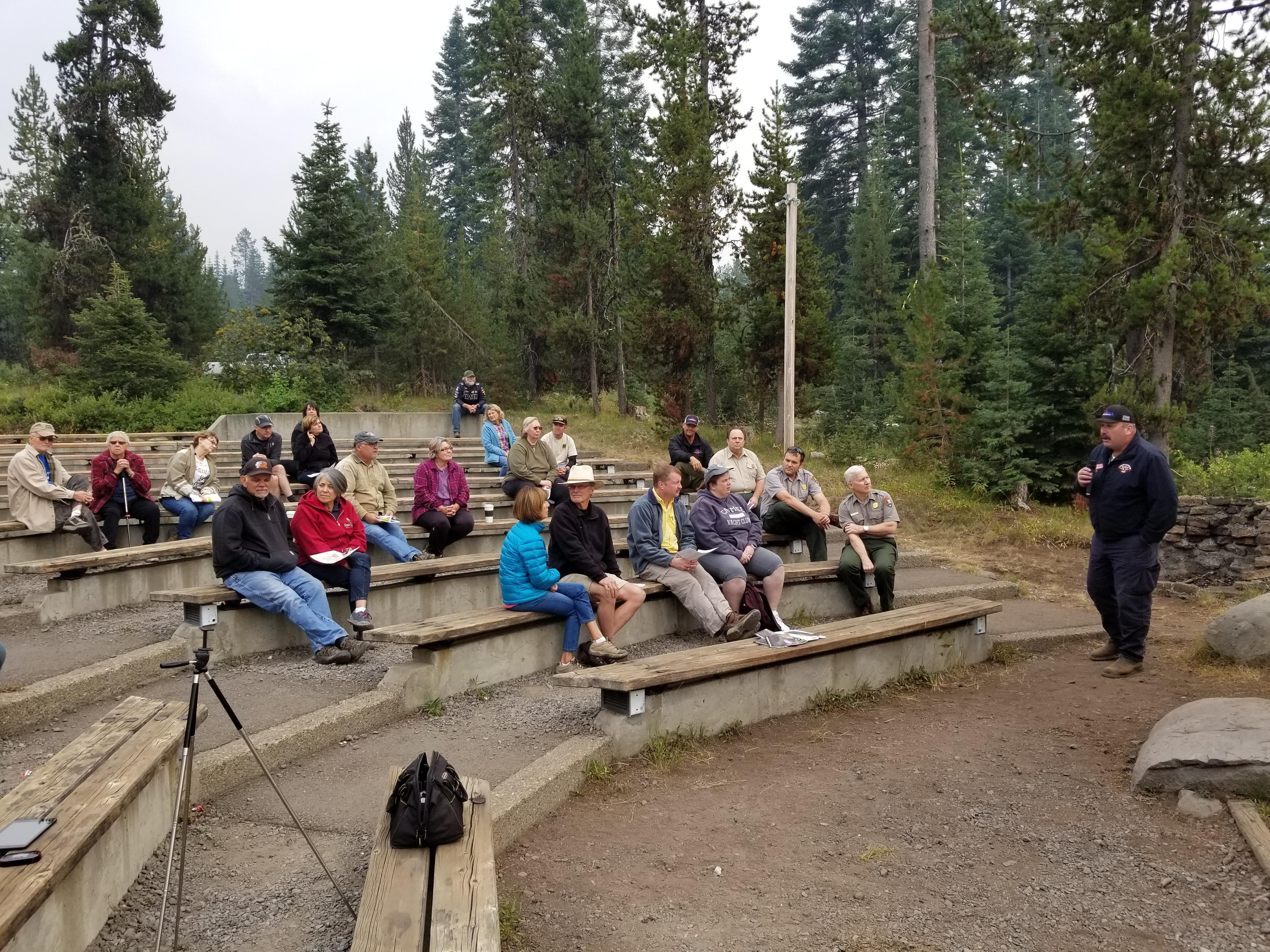
A community meeting held by park staff in Diamond Lake, Oregon

As of September 6, specific areas of Crater Lake National Park are closed, including the north entrance, to allow fire operations for the Spruce Lake Fire. Additionally, the Pacific Crest Trail from Dutton Creek Trail to North Entrance Road and from Oregon Route 62 to South Park Boundary, as well as Boundary Springs Trail; Bald Crater Loop Trail; Bert Creek Trail; Lightning Springs Trail; Watchman Trail; Union Peak Trail, Stuart Falls Trail, and Pumice Flat Trail.

As of August 27, select roads and trails of the Rogue River – Siskiyou National Forest, including Highway 62 and Highway 230, are closed due to Broken Lookout Fire and other nearby fires. Additionally, select roads and trails in the Fremont-Winema National Forest and Umpqua National Forest were closed, including all of Rogue-Umpqua Divide Wilderness.
