= 2025 in Oregon =

- Decades: 2000s; 2010s; 2020s
- See also: History of Oregon; Historical outline of Oregon; List of years in Oregon; 2025 in the United States

The following is a list of events of the year 2025 in Oregon.

== Politics and government ==
=== State government ===
- Governor: Tina Kotek (D)
- Secretary of State:
  - LaVonne Griffin-Valade (D; before January 6)
  - Tobias Read (D; after January 6)
- 83rd Oregon Legislative Assembly

== Deaths ==
- March 15 – Malcolm F. Marsh, U.S. District Court judge (born 1928)
- March 29 – Robert E. Jones, U.S. District Court and Oregon Supreme Court judge (born 1927)
- April 15 – Bill Morrisette, member of the Oregon Senate and House of Representatives, mayor of Springfield (born 1931)
- April 19 – Aaron Woods, member of the Oregon Senate (born 1950)
- May 29 – John George Vlazny, Roman Catholic prelate in Portland (born 1937)

== Events ==
=== Ongoing ===
- 2025 Oregon wildfires

=== January ===
- January – 2025 Oregon Nurses Association strike
- January 1
  - Portland's Crush Bar closes.
  - The Quaintrelle restaurant closes.
- January 4 – A railroad bridge over the Marys River collapses, and the freight train crossing it falls into the river.
- January 7 – Portland's Anna Bannanas Cafe closes.
- January 8 – The Oregon State Fire Marshal sends 240 firefighters and 60 fire engines to help combat wildfires in Southern California.
- January 13 – Governor Tina Kotek delivers a state of the state address at the State Capitol.
- January 13–27 – Cram Fire
- January 21 – The Portland Bangers FC are established.
- January 26
  - The Mama Bird restaurant in Portland closes.
  - Masala Lab PDX closes.

=== February ===
- February 7
  - Coos County Commissioners vote against a proclamation that would express their county's cooperation with ICE, citing Oregon's sanctuary laws, which ban local governments and law enforcement from assisting federal immigration enforcement.
  - Response to the Department of Government Efficiency: Oregon joins eight other states in a lawsuit to stop the Trump administration–and specifically Elon Musk and DOGE–from accessing citizens' private information.
- February 13 – Officials announce that the Bonneville Dam has lost a significant portion of its workforce due to Trump and DOGE's federal cost-cutting campaign.
- February 14 – Governor Kotek places the head of the Oregon Youth Authority on leave amid complaints about the treatment of youths in the system.

=== March ===
- March 5 – Festival Lanterns is demolished.
- March 10 – The United States Senate approves former Oregon representative Lori Chavez-DeRemer as the new United States Secretary of Labor.
- March 18 – A patient at the Oregon State Hospital dies in a secure room after the hospital mishandles the patient's medical emergency.
- March 23 – Postal workers meet at Pioneer Courthouse Square to protest Trump slashing funding for USPS.

=== April ===
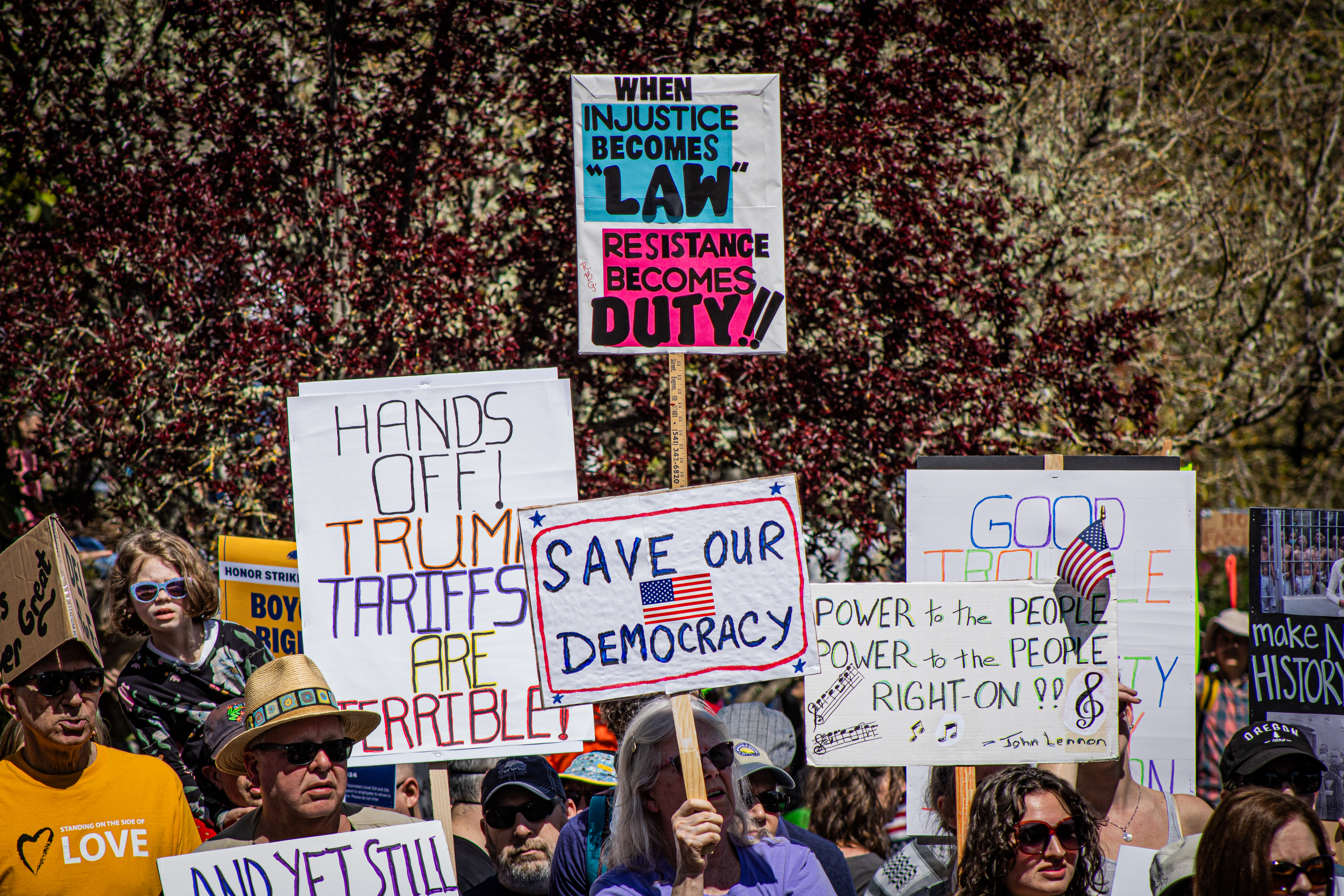
Hands Off protest in Eugene, April 5, 2025

- April 7 – CAHOOTS announces the immediate termination of services in Eugene.
- April 9 – Portland restaurant XLB closes.
- April 11 – Governor Kotek replaces the head of the Oregon State Hospital after receiving additional information about the death of a patient in March.
- April 23 – Oregon Senate Bill 605 passes, preventing medical debt from impacting patients' credit scores.

=== May ===
- May 8 – LGBTQ bar Misfits Bar and Lounge closes.
- May 9 – Former Secretary of State Shemia Fagan is fined and apologizes after the Oregon Government Ethics Commission finds she improperly used her position as auditor to secure a consulting gig.
- May 11 – The original Assembly Brewing location closes.
- May 15
  - Police raid the West Coast Game Park Safari in Bandon, seizing illegal methamphetamines and over 300 animals that were held in poor conditions.
  - A case of active tuberculosis is confirmed at Lane Middle School in Portland.
- May 22 – Travel Oregon CEO Todd Davidson announces his retirement amid mounting controversy around compensation and workplace culture at the agency.
- May 29 – A dead sperm whale washes up between Del Ray and Sunset Beach, north of Seaside. The necropsy finds that it was killed by a watercraft.
- May 30 – Crater Lake National Park superintendent Kevin Heatley steps down from the role after only five months, citing Trump administration staffing cuts as the main reason.
- May 31
  - Portland coffee shop Oui Presse officially closes; the business is sold to a new owner and renamed.
  - Malheur Enterprise publishes their last online edition, marking the newspaper's closure.

=== June ===
- June 6 – Portland Aquarium, an art installation by Mike Bennett, opens in Portland.
- June 9 – Governor Kotek expands the plastic bag ban to affect all bags of any thickness, closing a loophole in the 2020 ban. The law is set to come into effect in 2027.
- June 11–23 – Rowena Fire
- June 11 – The AEW Summer Blockbuster streams live from the Moda Center Theater of the Clouds in Portland.
- June 12 – A group of young Indigenous kayakers begin their descent along the entire course of the Klamath River, starting from the headwaters in Chiloquin, Oregon. It is the first "source-to-sea" descent in over 100 years, and is possible because of the removal of several dams along the Klamath in the few years before the event.
- June 13 – The Federal Bureau of Investigation (FBI) announces that people are using aerial drones and duffel bag drops to smuggle drugs and other contraband into the Federal Correctional Institution in Sheridan.
- June 14 – People attend No Kings protests at various cities in Oregon.
- June 20 – Oregon House Bill 3954 passes; the bill protects the Oregon National Guard from being used as law enforcement or deployed without the consent of the state's governor, and was put forward in reaction to Trump's deployment of the California National Guard during the June 2025 Los Angeles protests.
- June 24 – Measles resurgence in the United States: Amid the measles outbreak in the Southwest, the Oregon Health Authority announces the state's first confirmed measles case for 2025.
- June 30 – Portland's Rams Head Pub closes.

=== July ===
- July 1 – The state's minimum wage increases by 35 cents, so that it is now $16.30 per hour in Portland, $14.05 per hour in rural areas, and $15.05 per hour everywhere else.
- July 5 – The 2025 Prefontaine Classic airs live from Eugene, Oregon.
- July 7 – The Oregon Department of Transportation issues layoff notifications to over 480 employees, the first of two rounds of planned layoffs.
- July 8 – Portland restaurant Beastro closes.
- July 9 – The Federal Trade Commission (FTC) uses medical records from OHSU as examples in a presentation which argues that gender-affirming care is a kind of “fraud” that should be civilly prosecuted.
- July 15
  - The Women's National Basketball Association (WNBA) announces the expansion team in Portland will be called the Portland Fire, bringing back the name of a WNBA team from the early 2000s.
  - Immigration officials arrest a parent in the parking lot of a preschool in Beaverton. This is the first publicly known immigration enforcement arrest at a school in Oregon.
- July 16 – Governor Kotek declares a statewide wildfire emergency, effective immediately and lasting until the end of the year.
- July 19 – Six people are swept over Dillon Falls near Bend. Three are rescued, two are killed, and one is missing.
- July 24 – The Supreme Court issues a ruling that Oregon's adoption law requiring guardians to "respect, accept and support” a child's gender expression and sexual orientation is unconstitutional.
- July 25 – The U.S. Department of Education’s Office for Civil Rights accuses the Oregon Department of Education of violating Title IX protections by allowing transgender girls to compete with cisgender girls in school sporting competitions.
- July 27 – Portland art installation Fathom closes.
- July 30 – Fair Weather, a brunch restaurant, closes in Portland.
- July 31–August 3 – The 2025 USA Outdoor Track and Field Championships are held at Hayward Field in Eugene.

=== August ===
- August 1–3 – The 34th and final Oregon Jamboree Music Festival is held in Sweet Home.
- August 6
  - Nearly 200 educators attend the eighth annual Grand Ronde Education Summit, held at Spirit Mountain Casino by the Confederated Tribes of Grand Ronde.
  - Governor Kotek signs five bills into law in an effort to address a behavioral health crisis in the state.
- August 7
  - ICE arrests Guatemalan field workers in Woodburn. This is the first publicly known ICE arrest of field workers in Oregon since the start of Trump's second term.
  - Governor Kotek signs several bills, including one which allocates $45 million to the Willamette Falls Trust to allow the coalition of tribal governments, with leadership from former Governor Kate Brown, to build a visitor facility and programs at the Willamette Falls.
- August 9 – Portland's Slow Bar closes.
- August 10
  - Avelo Airlines ceases operations at the McNary Field airport in Salem, as it pulls out of all West Coast operations. This leaves the Salem airport without any airline carriers.
  - 2025 BitNile.com Grand Prix of Portland
- August 13 – The Oregon Employment Department announces that the state's unemployment rate has reached 5%, the highest since July 2021.
- August 14 – OHSU receives a $2 billion donation for cancer care and research; it is the largest single donation ever made to a U.S. university or academic health center.
- August 20 – The State of Oregon grants $12.5 million to Oregon City for the Grand Ronde to create tumwata village at the former site of the Blue Heron Paper Mill.
- August 21
  - Oregon Secretary of State Tobias Read rejects U.S. Attorney General Pam Bondi's demand that the state give them residents' voter data.
  - President Trump appoints Tootie Smith as the director of the Oregon Farm Service Agency.
  - A team extinguishes a fire inside the trunk of the Doerner Fir tree in Southern Oregon. The tree survives, but loses some of its height and its status as the world's tallest Douglas fir.
- August 22
  - Hood to Coast is held in Portland.
  - Portland temperatures surpass 100 degrees (F) for the first time in 2025.

=== September ===
- September 3 – Amid Robert F. Kennedy, Jr.'s broad changes to the CDC, the governments of Oregon, Washington, and California announce that they will form the West Coast Health Alliance to take over some of the CDC's former functions.
- September 16 – The Department of Justice sues Oregon and Maine over their refusal to deliver complete voter rolls to the Trump administration.
- September 27 – Trump announces he is sending federal troops to Portland.
- September 28 – The state of Oregon and city of Portland file a lawsuit against the Trump administration over the deployment of National Guard troops to Portland.

=== October ===
- October 3 – Trump announces an order to send 200 members of the Oregon National Guard to Portland as part of his deployment of federal forces to U.S. cities. A federal judge grants a temporary restraining order the same day.
- October 23 – Portland Trail Blazers head coach Chauncey Billups is charged in connection to an illegal gambling operation tied to the Italian mafia.
- October 26 – A fire engulfs the home of Portland City Councilor Candace Avalos. She and her pet cat escape the house unharmed. The fire is initially investigated as a possible arson. A homeless man is later charged with starting the fire, which prosecutors say he started in the shed after an outlet failed to power a heater he had.

=== November ===
- November 17 – In response to a lawsuit seeking clarification about Oregon's sanctuary laws, a federal judge orders Clackamas, Marion, Multnomah, and Washington counties to turn over information about immigrants who were convicted of violent crimes.

=== December ===
- December 11 – Willamette University and Pacific University, two of the oldest colleges in the western United States, announce plans to merge in 2026 into a new system called the University of the Northwest.
- December 31 – Trump says he is dropping his push to deploy National Guard troops in Portland, as well as Chicago and Los Angeles.

== See also ==
- 2025 Oregon Ducks baseball team
- 2025 Oregon Ducks football team
