= Jacqueline (restaurant) =

Restaurant in Portland, Oregon, U.S.

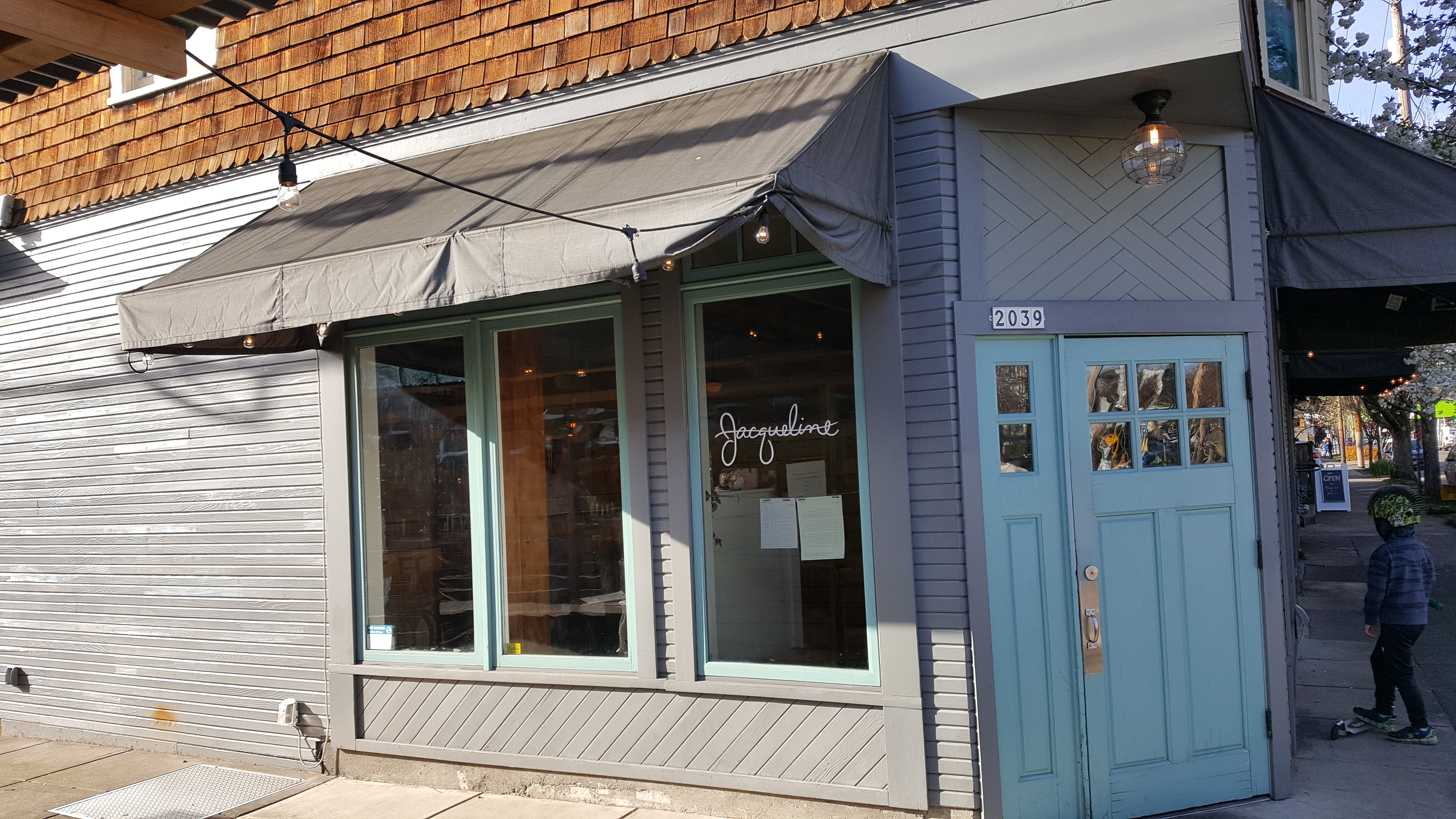
- The restaurant's exterior in March 2022
- Interactive map of Jacqueline

Restaurant information
- Established: August 24, 2016
- Owners: Derek Hanson; Brian Dufour
- Previous owner: Brandi Lansill
- Food type: Pacific Northwest; seafood
- Location: 2039 Southeast Clinton Street, Portland, Oregon, 97202, United States
- Coordinates: 45°30′12.7″N 122°38′41.3″W
- Website: jacquelinepdx.com

Jacqueline is a seafood restaurant serving Pacific Northwest cuisine in Portland, Oregon. The restaurant was established in 2016 and has an aquatic theme.

== Description ==
Eater Portland described Jacqueline as a "seasonal, vegetable and seafood-focused restaurant". Located in southeast Portland's Hosford-Abernety neighborhood, the Pacific Northwest restaurant has an aquatic theme and its name alludes to the film The Life Aquatic with Steve Zissou. The interior features a painting of actor Bill Murray.

== History ==
Chef owners Derek Hanson and Brandi Lansill opened the restaurant with co-owner Brian Dufour on August 24, 2016, in a space which previously housed St. Jack and the French restaurant Renard. Jacqueline began serving brunch in 2017. Lansil was no longer a co-owner, as of 2018.

During the COVID-19 pandemic, the restaurant's take-out menu included tacos, seafood buns, and ceviche. Jacqueline was "reborn" as Fair Weather in early 2021. The daytime cafe operation ended in December 2021. According to Thom Hilton of Eater Portland, Fair Weather's "seasonal doughnuts and colorfully-garnished coffee cocktails made it a social media sensation".

In September 2024, Eater Portland described plans for Jacqueline to relocate to 25th Avenue, in the Hosford-Abernethy space that previously housed La Moule. Hanson also announced plans to operate the pop-up Fair Weather in the original Jacqueline space, until the lease ends. Jacqueline re-opened in the new space on November 9, 2024.

== Reception ==
In 2017, Jacqueline was nominated for Restaurant of the Year by Eater Portland. Nick Woo included the restaurant in the website's 2019 list of "14 Delightful Spots to Eat and Drink on SE Clinton". Nathan Williams included Jacqueline in Eater Portland's 2022 overview of "Where to Crack Open a Dungeness Crab in Portland". He said Jacqueline "is one of the city's finest spots for seasonal seafood, and its Dungeness crab toast is easily one of its menu's biggest stars".

In 2023, pastry chef Darla Shaffer was one of 18 Portland industry professionals deemed "rising stars" by the restaurant resource and trade publication StarChefs. The business was included in Time Out Portland's 2025 list of the city's eighteen best restaurants. Michael Russell included Jacqueline in The Oregonian's 2025 list of the 21 best restaurants in southeast Portland. He also ranked the business number 12 in the newspaper's 2025 list of Portland's 40 best restaurants. Jacqueline ranked fourth in the happy hour category of the newspaper's Readers Choice Awards in 2025.

== See also ==
- List of Pacific Northwest restaurants
- List of seafood restaurants
