= Fair Weather (restaurant) =

Restaurant in Portland, Oregon, U.S.

- Interactive map of Fair Weather

Restaurant information
- Owner: Derek Hanson
- Head chef: Cici Wollack
- Chef: Derek Hanson
- Location: 2039 Southeast Clinton Street, Portland, Multnomah, Oregon, 97202, United States
- Coordinates: 45.5035°N 122.6448°W
- Website: fairweatherpdx.com

Fair Weather was a restaurant in Portland, Oregon, United States. It had two iterations and was described as a pop-up restaurant. Chef and owner Derek Hanson opened Fair Weather in January 2021, during the COVID-19 pandemic. The restaurant closed in December. Fair Weather re-opened in February 2025, with Cici Wollack as head chef. It closed permanently in July 2025.

== Description ==
The brunch restaurant Fair Weather operated in southeast Portland's Hosford-Abernethy. The menu was described as "vegan- and pescatarian-friendly" and included a variant of Eggs Benedict (poached egg on toast) with Dungeness crab, cedar-plank trout with potatoes and scrambled eggs, and fried chicken and waffles. It also included porridge bowls with jasmine rice, shiitakes, and bok choy, a yeasted waffle with hazelnut praline butter, and shrimp and grits. Fair Weather also served seasonal doughnuts, chocolate chip cookies and other pastries, as well as espresso and other coffee drinks.

== History ==
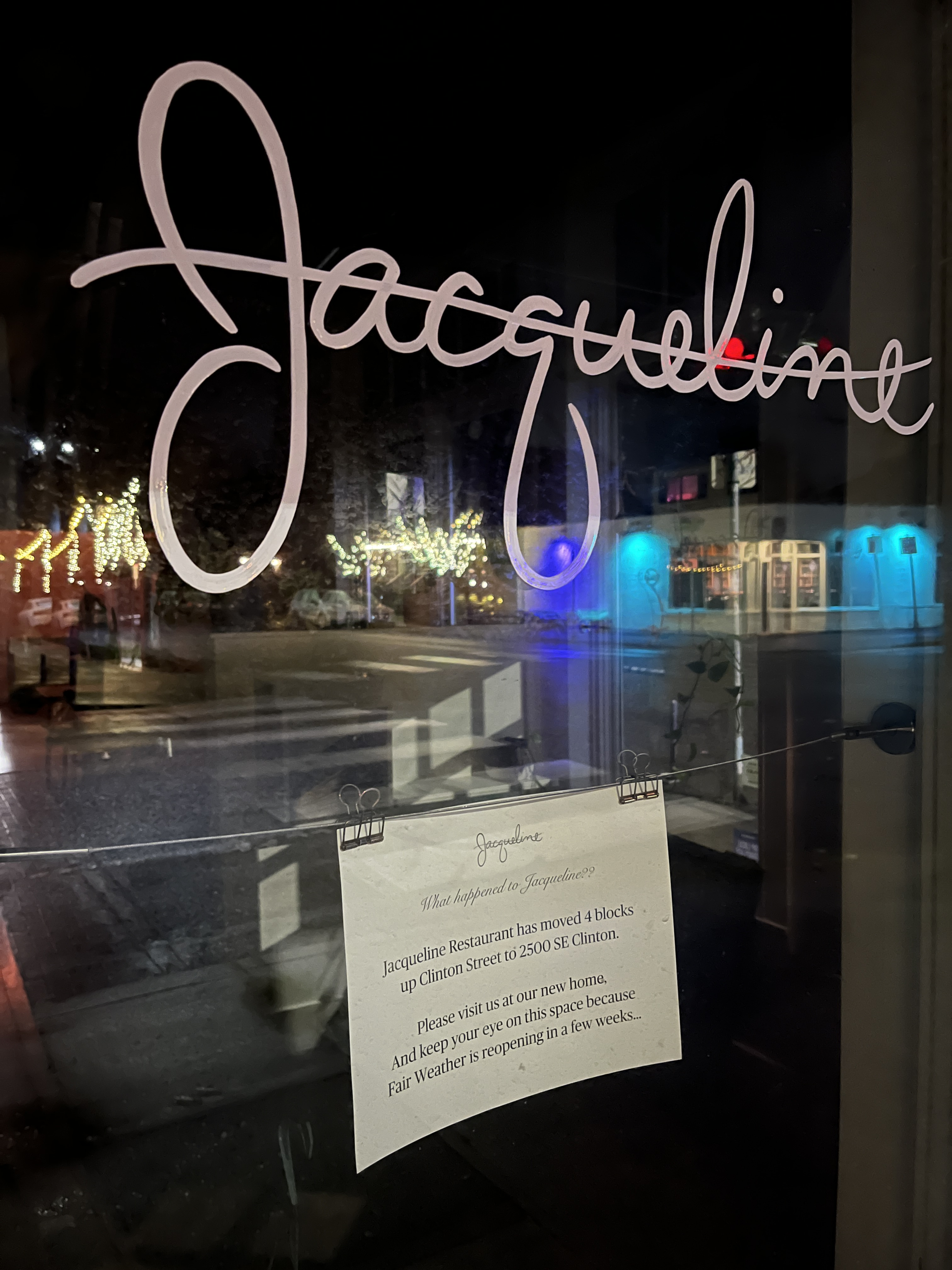
Note on the window of the restaurant Jacqueline in December 2024, teasing the opening of Fair Weather, which opened in 2025

Derek Hanson was the chef and owner. In January 2021, during the COVID-19 pandemic, Hanson announced that Fair Weather would replace the seafood restaurant Jacqueline. The new restaurant would open in late January, initially operating via take-out and limited outdoor dining, and would serve some items similar to Jacqueline's menu (but with eggs). Fair Weather operated until December. In an interview published by Eater Portland in February 2022, Hanson said, "Fair Weather will hopefully be back someday. We might find another spot to do it."

In August 2024, Hanson announced plans for Jacqueline to relocate to the former La Moule space. The Oregonian reported, "For the remainder of the lease on the current space, Hanson hopes to dust off a version of his much loved brunch concept, Fair Weather." Hanson said the temporary restaurant would offer brunch and coffee drinks in the mornings and limited dinner options and events in the evenings. Fair Weather began operating in early February 2025, with Cici Wollack as head chef. Reporting on the opening, Eater Portland said: "In a perfect world, Fair Weather is a big part of restoring Clinton Street's communal energy. Events, everything from private parties to wine pours from local producers, are big on Hanson's radar."

Fair Weather closed permanently in July 2025. The wine and seafood pop-up Merrow began operating in the space on July 31.

== Reception ==
Thom Hilton of Eater Portland said Fair Weather's doughnuts and "colorfully-garnished coffee cocktails" made the restaurant "a social media sensation". When the restaurant reopened in 2025, the website's Paolo Bicchieri included Fair Weather in a list of the city's best new restaurants and food carts. Eater Portland's Zoe Baillargeon also included Fair Weather in a 2025 list of the city's best new restaurants and food carts. Michael Russell of The Oregonian described Fair Weather as a "much loved pandemic-time brunch concept". The newspaper included Fair Weather in an overview of Portland's best new brunches of 2025. Russell included the yeasted waffle in The Oregonian's list of Portland's 25 best dishes of 2025.

== See also ==
- List of defunct restaurants of the United States
