= Boise Creek =

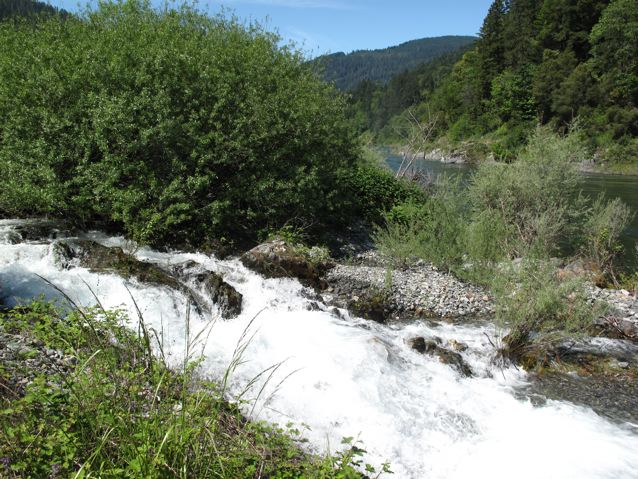
- Bedrock Falls blocks salmon passage up Boise Creek from the Klamath River

Location
- Country: United States
- State: California
- Region: Humboldt County

Physical characteristics
- Source: Orleans Mountain
  - coordinates: 41°15′54″N 123°26′43″W
  - elevation: 4,560 ft (1,390 m)
- Mouth: Confluence with the Klamath River
  - location: 2.25 miles southeast of Orleans, California
  - coordinates: 41°16′56″N 123°34′35″W
  - elevation: 320 ft (98 m)

Basin features
- Tributaries
  - left: Little South Fork Boise Creek
  - right: North Fork Boise Creek

Boise Creek is a stream in Humboldt County, California, United States. From its origin on Orleans Mountain it flows 8.5 miles to join the Klamath River about 2.25 miles southeast of Orleans, California. The creek lies within the Six Rivers National Forest and is part of the Lower Klamath River Watershed.

Coho salmon (Oncorhynchus kisutch) populations have declined dramatically in the Klamath River watershed due to eutrophication, raised water temperatures and decreased stream flows induced by the construction of dams, especially in years of drought. In addition, the dams have blocked access for salmon spawning grounds on over 300 miles of Klamath River watershed. The Coho salmon in the Southern Oregon - Northern California Coast (SONCC) Evolutionarily Significant Unit (ESU) are federally listed as threatened and are also listed as threatened by the California Department of Fish and Game since 2002.

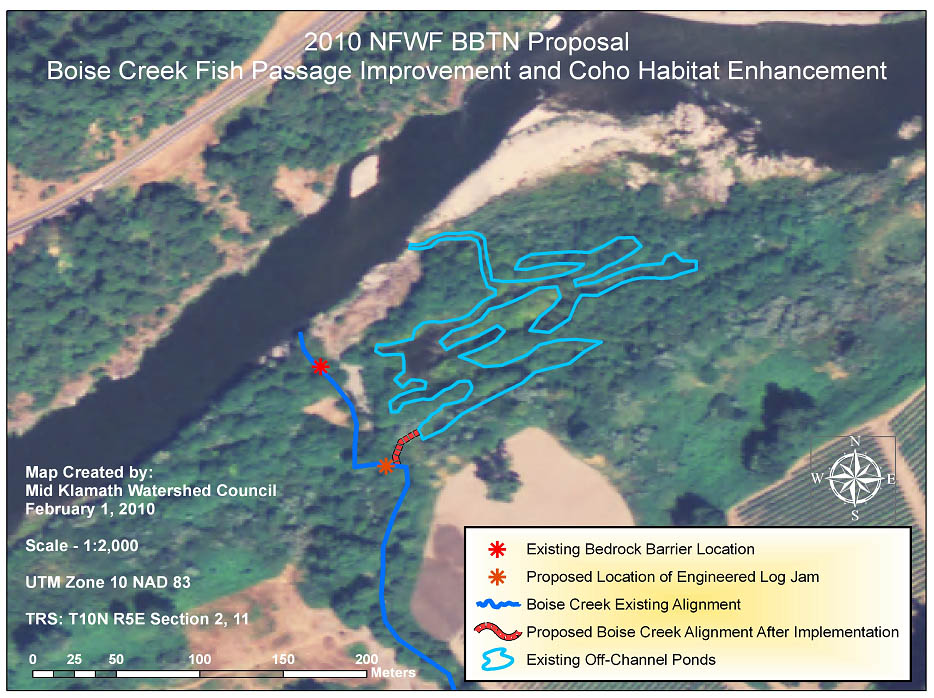
Proposal to Engineer Logjam to Divert Boise Creek to Bypass the Falls and Provide Salmon Passage courtesy of Mid Klamath Watershed Council

Access to Boise Creek for salmon has been blocked by a bedrock falls 13.5 feet high near the creekmouth (see figure) so the Mid Klamath Watershed Council proposed, in February 2010, creation of an engineered logjam to divert flows into historic side channels which would re-connect the creek to the Klamath River mainstem and bypass the falls. Before the logjam could be constructed, beaver coincidentally constructed a dam across Boise Creek at the proposed site, and numerous Coho salmon, Chinook salmon (Oncorhynchus tshawytscha) and Steelhead trout (Oncorhyncus mykiss) are now accessing the stream from the Klamath, opening several new miles of historic spawning habitat to the fish.

The beaver dam has also created off-channel ponds which have been shown to benefit coho by providing refuge from high flow conditions in the main river and a productive summer rearing habitat, leading to as much as a five-fold increase in coho abundance as well as increased size. It has also been shown that off-channel wetlands enhance chinook salmon growth and survival.

== See also ==
- Course of the Klamath River
