= Evoe (restaurant) =

Defunct lunch counter in Portland, Oregon, U.S.

- Interactive map of Evoe

Restaurant information
- Established: 2008
- Closed: 2014
- Chef: Kevin Gibson
- Location: 3731 SE Hawthorne Blvd., Portland, Multnomah, Oregon, 97214, United States
- Coordinates: 45°30′44″N 122°37′31″W

Evoe was a lunch counter in Portland, Oregon, in the United States. Kevin Gibson was the chef. Evoe operated on southeast Portland's Hawthorne Boulevard from 2008 to 2014, serving small plates such as sandwiches and salads.

== Description ==
The lunch counter Evoe operated next to the speciality grocery store Pastaworks on Hawthorne Boulevard. Matt Rodbard of Food Republic described Evoe as a "quirky room of stools and hyperseasonal worship". The counter served small plates such as sandwiches and Mediterranean salads. Among sandwiches was the Gallego, which had sardines and fennel. The Bob the Burner was an open sandwich with coppa, Calabrese salami, Calabrian chiles, and mozzarella, and the Dansk had cured salmon, horseradish, and dill. The Little Bo Peep had lamb meatballs on ciabatta. One of the salads had squash, balsamic vinegar, and pumpkin seeds. Evoe also served a Sauvie Island beet salad.

== History ==
Evoe opened in 2008 and closed in 2014, after Gibson departed in November 2013. Nodoguro began operating in the space. Gibson carried some of Evoe's dishes over to Davenport.

== Reception ==
In 2013, Eater Portland's Erin DeJesus called Evoe "beloved" and included the Gallego in a list of the city's "most iconic" sandwiches.
