= Oui Presse =

Defunct coffee shop in Portland, Oregon, U.S.

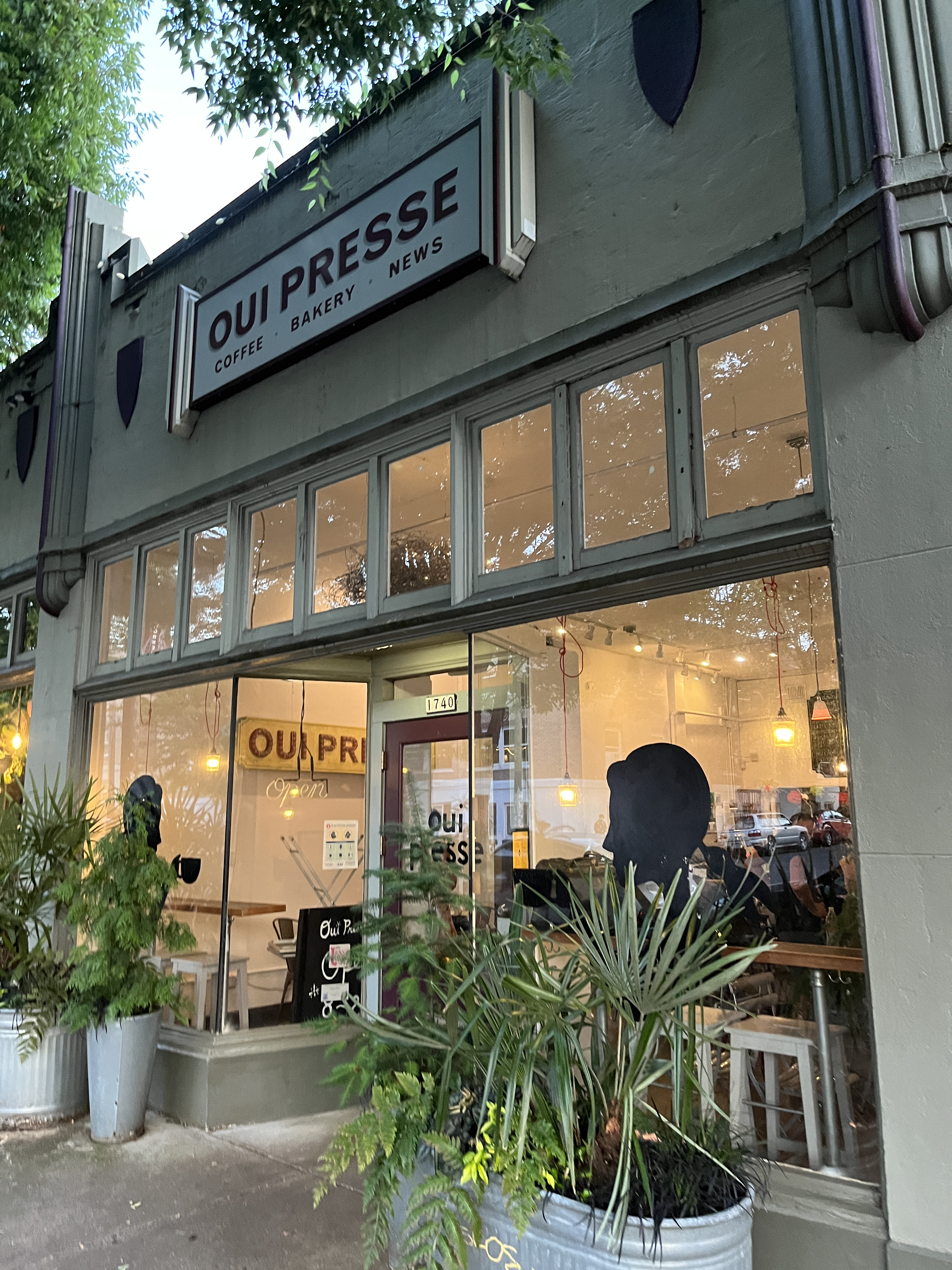
- The coffee shop's exterior in 2022
- Interactive map of Oui Presse

Restaurant information
- Established: December 23, 2010
- Closed: May 31, 2025
- Owner: Shawna McKeown
- Location: 1740 Southeast Hawthorne Boulevard, Portland, Multnomah, Oregon, 97214, United States
- Coordinates: 45.5120°N 122.6476°W
- Reservations: No

Oui Presse was a coffee shop, bakery, and newsstand in Portland, Oregon, United States. Owner Shawna McKeown opened the shop in the Ladd's Addition part of southeast Portland's Hosford-Abernethy neighborhood in December 2010. Oui Presse served coffee and espresso drinks, ice cream, pot pies, coffee cake and other baked goods, as well as a peanut butter and jelly sandwich (PB&J) and soups. The business garnered a positive reception, especially for its coffee cake and PB&J, and was deemed one of the city's best coffee shops by Condé Nast Traveler in 2018. After operating for fourteen years, the business closed permanently on May 31, 2025.

== Description ==
The coffee shop, bakery, and newsstand Oui Presse operated on Hawthorne Boulevard in the Ladd's Addition part of southeast Portland's Hosford-Abernethy neighborhood. It had a magazine rack and an outdoor patio. Jingle bells hung above the front door and large front windows allowed a lot of natural light. The interior had a high ceiling as well as stainless steel tables and chairs. Kitchen Table Magazine said the interior had a "warm" color scheme and a "well-balanced, uncluttered" design. There was also a metal sign with blinking lights and a display with vintage scoops and thermoses.

Condé Nast Traveler described Oui Presse as "cheery and feminine, with lights strung around and the smell of freshly baked cookies emanating from the kitchen". Similarly, Portland Monthly called the shop "a cozy, light-strung space stacked like an old-school newsstand with titles from The Art of Eating to Seventeen". Willamette Week described the business as "part bakery and cafe, part magazine stand" with publications like Vogue Italia and Lucky Peach. The shop also stocked Diner Journal and Remedy Quarter.

=== Menu ===
In addition to coffee and espresso drinks made using Stumptown, the menu included ice cream and a peanut butter and jelly sandwich (PB&J) called the PB&J Royale. Baguettes and toast were served with butter and jam. Oui Presse also served pot pie with chicken, soups, coffee cake, and other baked goods such as chocolate chip cookies.

Ice cream was made in small batches and caramel was the most popular flavor in 2012, according to Willamette Week. Other varieties included butterscotch pudding and crème fraiche. The coffee cake was made with butter, buttermilk, espresso, and sour cream, with a crumble topping made from brown sugar, hazelnut, and leftover batter. Pistachio was among cake varieties and lentil was among soup options. The chocolate chip cookies had chocolate chips from Belgium. Oui Presse's hot chocolate was made using dark chocolate and Belgian milk. The shop made its own chocolate base for mochas and caramel for lattes and macchiatos. Americanos and cappuccinos were among other coffee options on the drink menu.

== History ==
Owner Shawna McKeown opened Oui Presse on December 23, 2010, after signing a lease for the storefront in October. The space had previously been a cafe and a clothing shop. In January 2011, Oui Presse carried approximately 50 publications and McKeown planned to expand the selection to 150 titles.

As of 2014, Kurt Heilemann of the restaurant Davenport hosted a monthly pop-up supper club at Oui Presse. During the COVID-19 pandemic, Oui Presse offered socially distanced indoor dining and required face masks at times.

The business closed permanently on May 31, 2025. McKeown sold the business and Rose City Pour is slated to move into the space.

== Reception ==
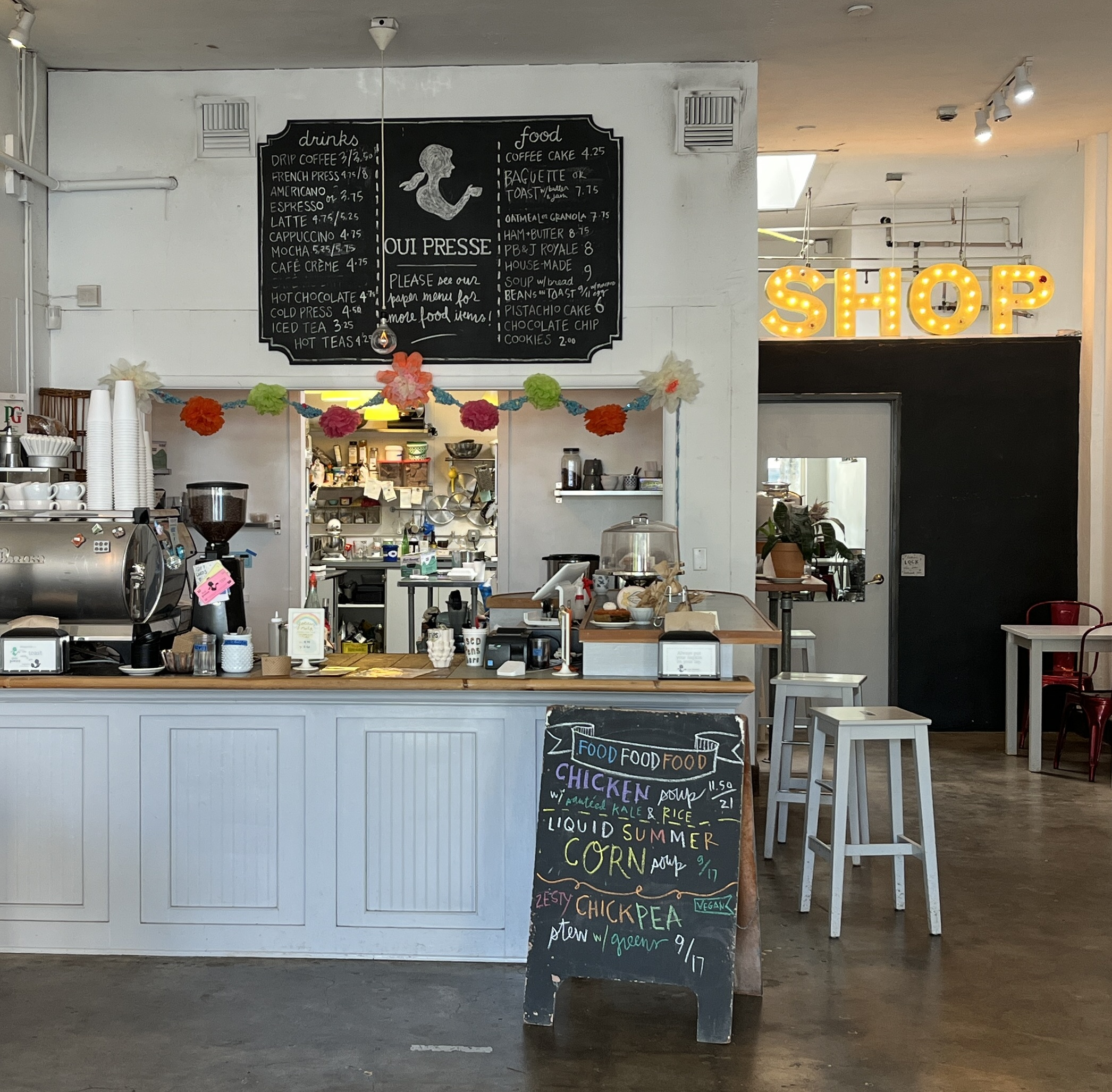
The coffee shop's interior, 2022

Michael Russell included Oui Presse in The Oregonian's 2017 overview of the city's best PB&Js. He called the business "charming" and said the PB&J Royale "is what PB&Js must have seemed like when we were kids". Hannah Wallace included the business in Condé Nast Traveler's 2018 list of Portland's fourteen best coffee shops. She opined, "The coffee here is perfectly adequate, but it won't impress coffee nerds—really, people are coming for the homey ambiance, the relative quiet, and the baked goods. Oh, and the amazing PB&J, which along with a hazelnut espresso coffee cake, comprises the very limited (but very delicious) food menu."

Penelope Bass of Willamette Week called Oui Presse "really cute" and wrote, "In fact, it's so downright adorable I expected to see Zooey Deschanel behind the counter serving cupcakes with a wink." Bass also called the ice cream "delicious" and said McKeown "has attracted a loyal following of fans with her tasty treats, delightful kitsch and collection of semi-obscure knitting magazines". The newspaper's Jason Cohen included Oui Presse in a 2019 survey of Portland's best coffee cake.

In 2011, Benjamin Tepler of Portland Monthly called the butterscotch pudding ice cream "fantastically creamy" and said the crème fraiche variety "brings a surprising tang, a delicious acid that cuts through the heavy dairy". In 2017, he called Oui Presse "a neighborhood favorite" and "our dream Portland coffee shop". Tepler said the coffee cake was among the city's best and "proof that you can have your coffee and eat it, too". Eater Portland's Erin DeJesus called the ice cream "killer" in 2013. In the website's 2022 overview of recommended restaurants near Ladd's Addition, Nathan Williams said "there's little wonder [Oui Presse is] a Ladd's favorite". Katherine Chew Hamilton also described Oui Presse as "charming" and recommended the French press in the website's 2025 list of the best restaurants and bars in the Hawthorne District.

Kerry Politzer of Oregon Jewish Life called Oui Presse "beloved" in 2015. Anna McClow of The La Salle Falconer, a student publication for La Salle High School in Milwaukie, included the business in a 2019 list of five "trendy" coffee shops in Portland. She complimented the coffee and inviting staff, and said the shop had a "homey, 'stay in on a rainy day' feel". Kitchen Table called the pistachio cake "the best cake ever" and said Oui Presse's cakes are "moist without being puddingy, sweet but not cloying, with a perfectly crumbly mouthfeel and just the right amount of thick, creamy frosting".

== See also ==
- List of defunct restaurants of the United States
