= Course of the Klamath River =

Coordinates: 41.5330600°N 124.0811300°W

The Klamath River is a river in southern Oregon and northern California in the United States. This article describes its course.

== Oregon ==
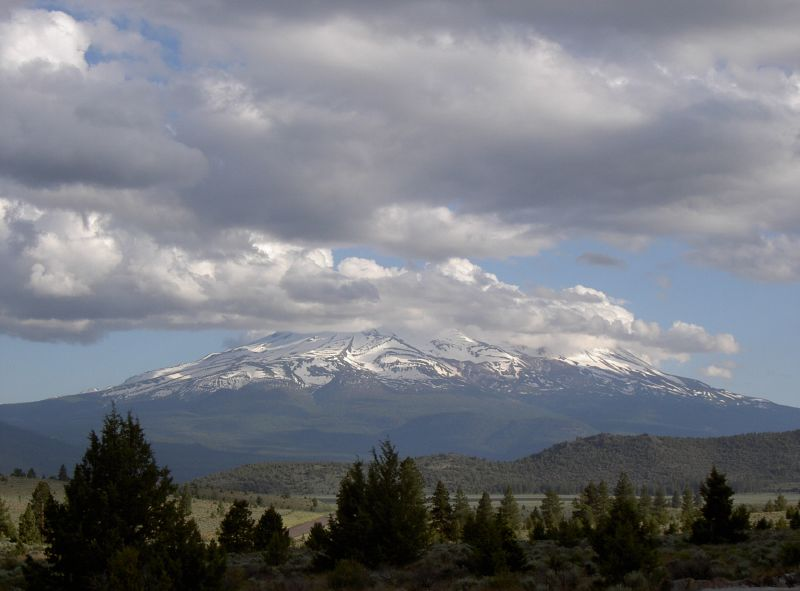
Mount Shasta rises above the Klamath River's watershed.

The Klamath River's drainage basin above Upper Klamath Lake is fed primarily by the Williamson River and the Sprague River, which stretch into south-central Oregon east of the Cascades. The official beginning of the 263-mile (423 km) long river is at the outlet of Upper Klamath Lake, a large and artificially expanded lake east of the Cascade Range. Above Upper Klamath Lake, several streams drain south and southeast from the Cascades to form Agency Lake, which is connected to Upper Klamath Lake. After flowing out of the Bureau of Reclamation-built dam, the river flows into a 1-mile (1.6 km) stretch known as the Link River, past the city of Klamath Falls and into Lake Ewauna, a 20-mile (32 km)-long reservoir. The Lost River enters from the left via a series of agricultural ditches and canals (formerly, all of its water emptied into Tule Lake). It crosses under Oregon State Route 97 twice, once upstream of and once downstream of Oregon Route 140, and continues west through an agricultural valley to Keno. At Keno the river veers sharply south and passes through the Keno Dam, which forms Lake Ewauna, 240 miles (390 km) from the mouth, passing the now-drained Lower Klamath Lake.

The Klamath enters a narrow gorge and runs northeast, then enters the area formerly holding the J.C. Boyle Reservoir, before the John C. Boyle Dam was removed, 231 miles (372 km) from the mouth. The river heads south and plunges rapidly into a narrow and deep gorge about 800 feet (240 m) deep and 2,300 feet (700 m) wide. After flowing a few miles through this narrow gorge, it widens into a rugged valley and turns west-southwest, crossing the Oregon-California border. Butte Creek comes in from the south. After crossing the border, the river turns sharply south, diverges around a small island, and receives Edge Creek from the right. The river then flows into the area, 200 miles (320 km) from the mouth, that contained Copco Lake. Copco Dam 1 and 2 have also been removed. From here the river bends sharply north then south around a ridge and receives Fall Creek from the right as it passes the town of Copco.

On October 2, 2024, Governor Newsom of California announced that the Klamath River restoration project to remove the four lower dams was complete. The removal of the Boyle, COPCO and Iron Gate dams reopened 400 miles of free flowing salmon spawning stream bed. The renewal project was a 20-year dream of the Yurok tribe, and a combined effort of Indian tribes, state government and utilities.

== Far northern California ==
The river then enters the former Iron Gate Reservoir area (also removed), 196.8 miles (316.7 km) from the mouth. The river receives Jenny Creek, a much larger tributary, which is formed by streams draining out of Howard Prairie Lake nearly 20 miles (32 km) to the north. The reservoir bends south and the Klamath flows away through Iron Gate Dam, 190 miles (310 km) from the mouth. The river then swings west and passes through an arid valley used for farming and ranching. Near Hornbrook the river receives Hutton Creek from the right and turns sharply south as it meets Interstate 5.The river then veers west again as it receives the Shasta River, which flows north from the Mount Shasta area, from the left. California State Route 96 drops into the canyon and begins to parallel the river, some 180 miles (290 km) from the mouth.

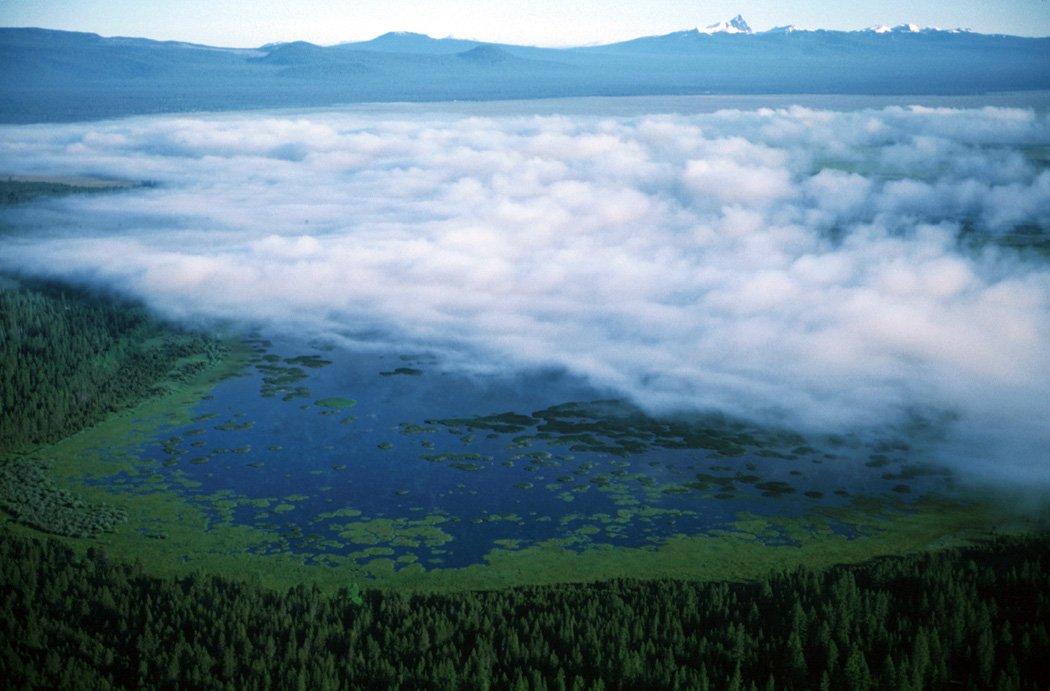
Lower Klamath Lake seen today under heavy fog, with Mount Thielsen in the far background

Flowing through its narrow canyon, the river receives Beaver Creek from the right, 170 miles (270 km) from the mouth, as it passes the small hamlet of Klamath River from the south. It then turns west, and with the massive bulk of Dry Lake Mountain looming to the north, the river receives Horse Creek from the right after passing the town of the same name. It then turns south and then west, whipsawing through an increasingly narrow gorge, and receives the Scott River from the left and passes Hamburg, 150 miles (240 km) from the mouth. The river then passes Seiad Valley and receives Seiad Creek from the right and Grider Creek from the left, 141 miles (227 km) from the mouth. The river then enters another narrower gorge and passes Fort Goff before dropping over a series of rapids.

The river rounds a bend southward, then twists sharply northward, southwest and southeast around a ridge as it receives China Creek from the left, 135 miles (217 km) from the mouth. The river then again bends southwest, then curves northward, diverges around two islands, then swings east and finally southwest around another ridge as it enters a wider valley and passes the town of Happy Camp, 130 miles (210 km) from the mouth. Receiving wide, shallow Indian Creek from the right, the Klamath then bends southwest into a narrow gorge, still paralleling State Route 96. The river passes Clear Creek 85 miles (137 km) from the mouth and receives the creek of the same name as it begins to flow south-southeast; a little farther on, it receives Independence Creek from the left, then bends west as it receives King Creek from the left.

Now incised into a narrow channel and meandering around sandbars and gravel bars, the river drops over rapid after rapid and turns south as it receives Dillon Creek from the right, 78 miles (126 km) from the mouth. Ti Creek enters from the left and Rock Creek from the right as the river continues to flow south through a steep and narrow gorge, cutting through the Cascade Range itself. The valley of the Klamath gradually transitions from an arid high desert to a temperate rainforest climate. It drops over Ishi Pishi Falls, a historical Native American fishing spot, and receives the Salmon River, its most powerful tributary thus far, from the left, 50 miles (80 km) from the mouth. Here it rounds a small ridge, then turns southwest and passes the town of Orleans, 45 miles (72 km) from the mouth. The river then bends north, west and south around another ridge, receives Boise Creek from the left and Slate Creek and Bluff Creek from the right, 28 miles (45 km) from the mouth.

== Weitchpec to mouth ==
The Klamath rounds a northerly bend around Burrill Peak, passing Weitchpec as it turns northwestward on the beginning of its final run to the sea. At Weitchpec, the river receives its largest and most important tributary, the Trinity River, from the south (left), 30 miles (48 km) from the mouth. A vital contributor to the flow of the lower Klamath, the Trinity drains 2,853 square miles (7,390 km^{2}) in the Cascade Range south of the Klamath and Salmon rivers. More than 90 percent of its flow is diverted at Trinity Lake – leaving the most important tributaries below the dam, the North Fork, South Fork, and the New River to replenish it. At Weitchpec, State Route 96 turns away from the Klamath and runs south up the Trinity, and its role along the Klamath is replaced by California State Route 169. After collecting the Trinity, the Klamath turns north-northwest and receives Pine Creek and Tully Creek from the left.

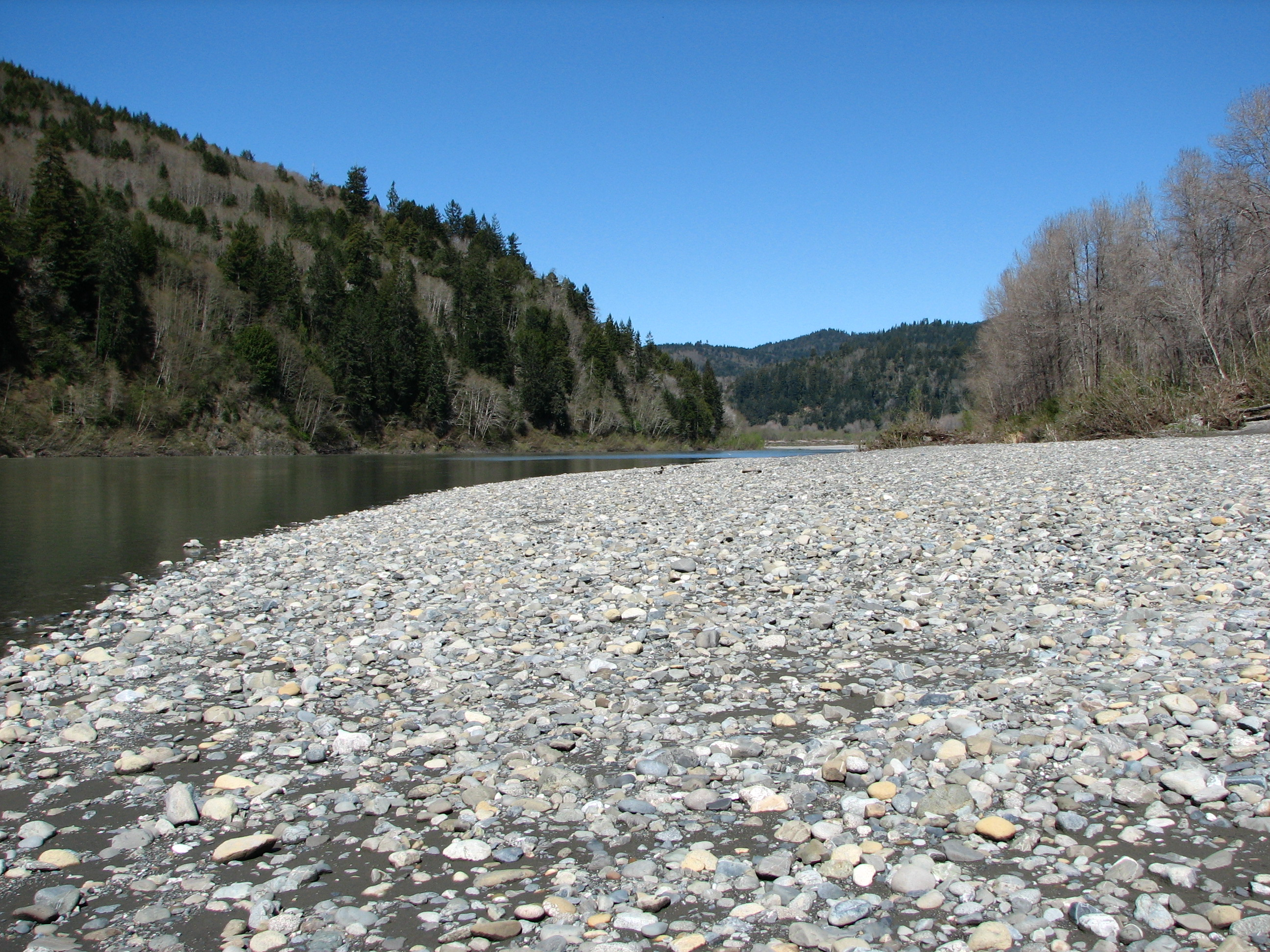
The Klamath approaching its mouth, near the Turwar Creek confluence

Twisting westwards, then again north, the Klamath passes the town of Johnsons, 20 miles (32 km) from the mouth. State Route 169 terminates at Johnsons, and for the remainder of its course, the Klamath flows through a wild canyon nearly untouched by human intervention. It diverges around a large sandy island, and receives Ah Pah Creek from the left and Blue Creek from the right, 12 miles (19 km) from the mouth. This area was originally intended to be the site of a massive storage dam, Ah Pah Dam. The river flows north through an increasingly wide valley, then passes the town of Klamath Glen, where State Route 169 resumes. The river meanders north and then veers west, crossing under U.S. Highway 101 and passing the towns of Klamath and Requa. All three towns are on the right bank of the river. Less than a mile downstream of this point, the Klamath empties into the sea, 16 miles (26 km) south of Point St. George and 30 miles (48 km) north of Trinidad Head.

Much of the middle course of the river in California is within the Klamath National Forest. The lower course of the river, in northern Humboldt County and southern Del Norte County, passes through the homeland of the Karuk Tribe and the Yurok Indian Reservation. An 11-mile (18 km) stretch of the river in Oregon south of Klamath Falls to the California–Oregon border, including the Hell's Corner Gorge, has been designated as the Klamath Wild and Scenic River.

== See also ==
- Klamath River
- Klamath Project, the set of United States Bureau of Reclamation dams on upstream tributaries of the Klamath, primarily for agricultural water storage
- Klamath River Hydroelectric Project, the set of privately owned dams on the mainstem of the Klamath, some of which are targeted for removal
- River of Renewal: Myth and History in the Klamath Basin (book)

== Works cited ==
- Palmer, Tim (1993). The wild and scenic rivers of America. Island Press. ISBN 1-55963-145-7.
- U.S. Coast and Geodetic Survey (UCGS, 1951). United States Coast Pilot. University of California.
- Board on Environmental Studies and Toxicology (BEST); Water Science and Technology Board (WSTB), 2008. Hydrology, Ecology and Fishes of the Klamath River Basin. National Academies Press.
