= Rowena Fire =

2025 wildfire in Oregon, U.S.

- Part of 2025 Oregon wildfires
- The Rowena Fire on the night of June 11, 2025
- Date: June 11 – June 25, 2025
- Location: Rowena, Wasco County, Oregon
- Coordinates: 45°40′45″N 121°17′21″W

Statistics
- Burned area: 3,700 acres (1,500 ha)
- Land use: Federal, state, tribal, and private

Impacts
- Deaths: 0
- Injuries: 2
- Evacuated: 8,000 under notices
- Structures destroyed: 56 residential, 91 secondary, 18 minor
- Cost: $9 million (suppression, 2025 USD) $236,676 (confirmed cleanup efforts) (Note: Phase two of cleanup efforts, removing debris off burned properties to prepare for rebuilding, was estimated at over $4.5 million.)

Ignition
- Cause: Human-caused; (Note: The exact cause has not been determined.)

Map
- Perimeter of Rowena Fire (map data)

The Rowena Fire was a wildfire that burned near Rowena and The Dalles, Oregon, United States. The wildfire ignited shortly after 1:30 pm Pacific Daylight Time (PDT) (Note: All times are in Pacific Daylight Time (PDT) unless otherwise noted.) on June 11, 2025, from a cause that remains under investigation. The fire quickly spread to 3,000 acres (1,200 ha) that day. Governor Tina Kotek issued an Emergency Conflagration Act, enabling extra resources to fight the fire, and she declared a state of emergency. The fire destroyed 56 residential, 91 secondary, and 18 minor structures.

Preceded by a record-breaking heatwave across the Pacific Northwest and several months of abnormal dryness and heat, the Rowena Fire was fanned across dry, vegetation-covered hillsides in the eastern Columbia River Gorge. Evacuation notices were soon issued, eventually encompassing 8,000 residents. Stretches of Interstate 84 and U.S. Route 30 closed. It was mapped at 3,831 acres (1,550 ha) on June 13, and the damage assessment was completed on June 15. All evacuation orders were downgraded on June 16. The Rowena Fire was fully contained (Note: Containment measures control lines around a fire's perimeter that the fire should not cross. When a fire reaches 100 percent containment, a line has been built around the fire perimeter. Containment does not mean a hazard no longer exists in or around the fire perimeter or the fire has stopped burning.) on June 25.

All residential structures destroyed were in Rowena. The State of Oregon granted several million dollars to Wasco County for cleanup efforts. State-funded cleanup efforts were completed in June 2026. The Federal Emergency Management Agency partially covered the cost of suppression efforts. Water and septic systems were compromised by the Rowena Fire. Low burn severity was seen throughout the burn scar, allowing several impacted plant species to regrow. A couple impacted by the Rowena Fire alleges sparks from a Union Pacific Railroad train started the fire, although no federal agency has confirmed a cause.

== Background ==
Wildfire season in Oregon typically lasts between mid-May and the first major rains, often in late September. The Rowena Fire burned west of The Dalles, which lies in the eastern Columbia River Gorge. The Cascade Range roughly divides the Columbia River Gorge into east and west; the eastern Columbia River Gorge is dominated by drier grassland from the mountain range's rain shadow. The Columbia River Gorge also functions as a wind funnel from its topography through the Cascades, often creating winds up to 50 miles per hour (80 km/h) during wildfire season. The Gorge has seen multiple wildfires in recent years, including the 2017 Eagle Creek Fire, the 2018 Substation Fire, and the 2024 Microwave Tower Fire near Mosier, Oregon. A separate wildfire in 2014, also known as the Rowena Fire, burned in a similar area at 3,500 acres (1,400 ha) and destroyed one residential structure. The Columbia River Gorge is also considered a wildland-urban interface, a residential setting where neighborhoods lie within fire-prone wildland.

The 2024–25 winter saw above-average precipitation and a steady snowpack, leading to rapid vegetation growth in eastern Oregon that spring. In late March 2025, there was no drought or abnormal dryness in Oregon since 2019. However, April, May, and the first weeks of June were abnormally warm and dry, minimizing the impacts of the winter and drying out the now-abundant vegetation. The National Interagency Fire Center (NIFC) had forecast above-average wildfire potential across Oregon. Western Wasco County was experiencing abnormally dry conditions. (Note: The United States Drought Monitor classifies dry or drought-stricken areas in five levels: D0 means "abnormally dry" and D4 means "exceptional drought". D0 is generally classified as the 20.01 to 30.00 percentile for precipitation.) on June 10, 2025. In the preceding week, an intense heatwave across the Pacific Northwest dried out soil and vegetation, leaving plants more vulnerable to wildfire ignition and spread; The Dalles broke its daily high temperature record for June 9, recording a temperature of 101 °F (38 °C).

The Rowena Fire was fueled by record-low fuel moistures. Strong, gusty winds between 30 and 40 miles per hour (48 and 64 km/h) fanned the fire across the dry land. These strong winds led to the fire spotting (Note: A spot fire starts from an ember jumps the fire perimeter, often driven by wind.) before fire crews were fully situated. The Rowena Fire ignited in steep terrain, fueling its quick eastern and upwards movement towards The Dalles. The Oregon State Fire Marshal said, "conditions are like it's August." However, low burn severity was seen due to reduced vegetation after the 2014 Rowena Fire and fuel treatment efforts in the Rowena Basin between 2006 and 2020 that involved thinning and pile burns. (Note: Pile burns are a kind of prescribed burn that involves firefighters piling and burning vegetation and forest debris.) Regionally on June 11, temperatures peaked between 80 and 90 °F (27 and 32 °C) and dipped to 50 and 60 °F (10 and 16 °C).

According to estimates by the United States Census Bureau by June 2025, the unincorporated community of Rowena, Oregon (where the bulk of the Rowena Fire's destroyed structures lie) had a population of about 130. Over fifty percent are above sixty years old and over fifty percent live below the poverty line. A spokesperson for Wasco County estimated over fifty percent of the residents do not have home insurance due to the high cost. Rowena already had a low number of housing units before the Rowena Fire.

== Cause ==
The Rowena Fire started on June 11, 2025, near the unincorporated community of Rowena, Oregon. The Oregon Department of Forestry said it believed the fire was human-caused after ruling out a lightning strike, but the cause remains under official investigation. The Oregon Department of Forestry request help from witnesses to identify the cause. The precise area of origin is still under investigation.

In a lawsuit, a couple affected by the Rowena Fire allege that the fire was caused by a Union Pacific Railroad train sending off sparks. The victims' legal complaint alleges "several eyewitnesses" saw "superheated particles" emitted from the train, and flames sparked in nearby brush and vegetation. A California-based attorney interviewed witnesses and reviewed social media posts related to the fire. The couple is suing for "property loss, emotional distress, lost wages, and evacuation costs" (seeking double damages for economic losses under a state law) and argues Union Pacific violated the Federal Railroad Safety Act and the Locomotive Inspection Act. No official cause for the fire has been identified by the Oregon Department of Forestry or any other county, state, or federal authority.

== Progression ==
The Rowena Fire at exit 76 of Interstate 84 on June 11

The Rowena Fire is estimated to have started at 1:37 pm on June 11, 2025, near milepost 78 of Interstate 84. Sustained winds were reported at 25 miles per hour (40 km/h); the fire's size was unclear. Interstate 84 between Mosier and The Dalles was request to be shut down by 1:46 pm, per radio traffic. The Wasco County Sheriff's Office was flooded with reports of the Rowena Fire. Level 1, 2, and 3 evacuations (Note: In Oregon, a Level 1 (Ready) evacuation means a resident should prepare to evacuate and be aware of danger in their area. A Level 2 (Set) evacuation means a resident should be ready to evacuate at any moment. A Level 3 (Go) evacuation means a resident is under a lawful evacuation order and leave immediately due to extreme hazards in the area.) would be issued near Rowena and along Interstate 84 within one hour. Door-to-door evacuations were conducted along U.S. Route 30 by 2:05 pm. All evacuation notices were upgraded to evacuation orders at about 3 pm between Rowena Ferry Road and Discovery Road at the intersection with U.S. Route 30. Shortly after 4:00 pm, Governor Tina Kotek invoked the Emergency Conflagration Act, which allowed the Oregon State Fire Marshal to direct resources towards the Rowena Fire. Throughout the late afternoon and evening, Level 1 and 3 evacuation levels were issued south of the Rowena Fire and Level 1 and 2 evacuations were issued southeast of the fire towards The Dalles. At points throughout the day, law enforcement went door-to-door to evacuate residents. The Red Cross set up an emergency shelter at The Dalles Middle School; 45 evacuees stayed overnight. The Wasco County Fairgrounds in Tygh Valley opened to livestock, horses, and trailers. Firefighting pilots estimated the fire at 2,500 acres (1,000 ha) around 7:25 pm, although the exact size remained unclear. Three task forces were sent in by the Oregon State Fire Marshal that night. Spread to the west was largely stopped, credited to local fire teams. Throughout the day, two small wildfires under 50 acres (20 ha) across the Columbia River near Carson, Washington.

The Rowena Fire on June 12, seen from Interstate 84

Interstate 84 reopened early morning on June 12 after hazardous trees along the highway were removed. Level 1 evacuations were issued south and southwest of the Rowena Fire. The fire was "aggressively burning" that morning, mapped at 3,500 acres (1,400 ha) by the NIFC. An estimated 180 firefighters were responding. A preliminary damage assessment recorded 20 structures destroyed and 2,200 threatened. Despite high winds between 20 and 30 miles per hour (32 and 48 km/h)) that posed a challenge to firefighting efforts, there was little growth on the fire; by the morning of June 13, it was mapped at 3,831 acres (1,550 ha) with an infrared flight.

Overnight, fire crews make progress around Rowena and U.S. Route 30. Over 450 personnel were responding to the Rowena Fire by the morning of June 13. A Level 2 evacuation in The Dalles was reduced to Level 1 status shortly after noon. According to the Wasco County Sheriff's Office, damage assessments updated that afternoon were destroyed, although assessments had not concluded. At 7 pm, the Oregon Fire Marshal, Oregon Department of Forestry, and Wasco County Sheriff's Office held a community meeting at The Dalles High School.

The Rowena Fire experienced winds up to 30 miles per hour (48 km/h) overnight. Progress was made on the containment line on the west and southwestern perimeter of the fire, while mop-up efforts (Note: Mop-up typically involves firefighters extinguishing flames and removing material set ablaze along a wildfire's perimeter, often to secure a wildfire's perimeter or reduce smoke.) continued. Fire crews prioritized hazard tree removal, especially along Interstate 84 and U.S. Route 30. Five percent contained, 484 personnel were combating the Rowena Fire. Winds throughout the day were weaker, sustained winds 8 to 22 miles per hour (13 to 35 km/h) and gusts up to 33 miles per hour (53 km/h) along ridges. Multiple Level 3 evacuation zones along Interstate 84 were downgraded to Level 2 evacuations throughout the afternoon and evening. Mapped at 3,633.4 acres (1,470.4 ha), containment increased to 10 percent that night. A flare-up (Note: A flare-up is a relatively short yet sudden rapid intensification in the spread or severity of a wildfire.) was seen well within the northern perimeter, but it was soon extinguished. The focus was now patrolling the fire's perimeter and mop-up operations.

Night crews focused on mop-up and extinguishing hot spots, (Note: A hot spot is an area of a wildfire that is especially active.) with such operations continuing into the day. Firing operations took place on the southwestern edge of the fire on June 15 as conditions permitted, removing unburned vegetation. A firing operation took place near Seven Mile Hill along the Rowena Fire's southern perimeter around 1 pm. The damage assessment was finalized by employees of the Oregon State Fire Marshal, they confirmed the Rowena Fire destroyed 56 residential structures and 91 other structures that included outbuildings and commercial structures. That evening, containment increased to 24 percent as the fire was mapped at 3,636 acres (1,471 ha) with 726 personnel. Overall, conditions were much cooler, but winds gusting up to 40 miles per hour (64 km/h) proved problematic for containment efforts.

Handheld infrared tools helped crews identify hot spots overnight. Crews made progress on the Rowena Fire as containment increased to 37 percent on June 16. All Level 3 evacuations were reduced to Level 1 or 2 notices at 12 pm, and all previous Level 1 evacuations were lifted. Strong afternoon winds prompted fire crews to halt hazard tree removal in the southeast area of the burn scar for the remainder of the day. The fire was mapped at 3,570 acres (1,440 ha) that night; few areas of problematic heat remained.

On June 17, the battalion chief of a crew dispatched to the Rowena Fire stated the fire saw improvement, but he still considered fire activity significant. Locally, some houses remained under Level 3 evacuations due to hazardous rockslides and trees. Additional progress was made around the perimeter, as the fire was 53 percent contained. The bulk of the Rowena Fire's southern perimeter was surrounded by a cold containment line 150 feet (46 m) deep that was 100 feet (30 m) deep along other stretches of the perimeter. Several fire crews were demobilized to their home district or assigned to other wildfires. Shortly before noon, two Level 2 evacuation zones were downgraded to Level 1; the NIFC mapped the fire at 3,700 acres (1,500 ha) around 8:30 pm. All Level 2 evacuations were downgraded to Level 1 on June 18, and all previous Level 1 evacuations were lifted. Fire crews prioritized mop-up, primarily around U.S. Route 30. Suppression repair began, including erosion control efforts. All Level 1 evacuations were lifted and the evacuation shelter at The Dalles Middle School closed at 12 pm on June 19.

The fire was 96 percent contained on June 24, and management was transitioned to local resources. Rain helped suppression efforts, and U.S. Route 30 had reopened to local traffic. Containment increased to 99 percent by the end of the day. The Rowena Fire reached 100 percent containment on June 25.

== Effects ==
Satellite view centered on the Rowena Fire, showing Mount Hood in the bottom left corner

=== Damage ===
The Rowena Fire burned across federal, state, tribal and private land. The fire destroyed 56 residential, 91 non-residential, and 18 minor structures in and around Rowena and The Dalles. All residential structures destroyed were located in Rowena. Critical infrastructure was also severely damaged. Initially, damage assessments showed 20 residential structures destroyed on June 12 and 49 destroyed on June 13. The area and structures near the fire were considered hazardous because of unstable structures, toxic ash, and sharp metal. Impacted residents struggled to find shelter, partially due to the low number of rentals in the Rowena area and the housing market was dominated by vacation and second homes. Hotels were booked with upcoming sports events and summer tourists, straining hotel availability. Initial toxic debris removal efforts were expected to take several weeks. The Oregon Department of Environmental Quality initiated hazardous waste cleanup efforts on July 18, 2025, costing $236,676. (Note: All monetary values are in 2025 USD unless otherwise noted.) remaining cleanup fell primarily to Wasco County. The State of Oregon was initially unable to fund the second stage of cleanup efforts despite promises to residents, but Kotek's office later allocated the necessary funds. Such efforts were expected to cost over $4.5 million, with the state promising to pay for at least 50 percent. Additional money was authorized case-by-case. The second phase of cleanup was completed in June 2026. The fire destroyed the Fulton-Taylor House. The nearby the Columbia Gorge Discovery Center & Museum sustained fire and water damage, and it had to evacuate four raptors to the Sunriver Nature Center. Its sign along Interstate 84 was destroyed; several trails and scenic overviews were left inaccessible from hazardous trees. The museum closed until September 2025. The Wasco County Board Commissioner members estimated recovery may last five to seven years after the Rowena Fire. The fire came very close to The Dalles Country Club; its restaurant lost part of its larger supply anticipated to be used on the upcoming Father's Day. Two injuries were reported, although no serious injuries or fatalities occurred.

Several victims opened GoFundMe pages to financially recover, although scams were reported by the Wasco County Sheriff's Office. Governor Tina Kotek declared a state of emergency for the Rowena Fire and invoked the Emergency Conflagration Act. The state of emergency was initially set to last between June 20 and July 30, but it was extended until November 2, 2025 on August 1. On June 12, the Federal Emergency Management Agency (FEMA) authorized federal funds to pay for up to 75 percent of suppression costs to the State of Oregon. Suppression efforts cost approximately $9 million. State legislators on the Oregon Joint Emergency Board voted to give the Oregon Department of Emergency Management $2.5 million in November 2025. In December 2025, the Oregon Department of Emergency Management granted $3.5 million to Wasco County to remove hazardous debris on private property because the damage from the Rowena Fire was below the threshold for a Presidential Disaster Declaration which restricted direct aid from FEMA to civilians. The agreement was made because wildfire debris on private property prevented homeowners from rebuilding. The grant also covered costs of necessary soil testing and stormwater, dust, erosion, and safety controls. United Way raised money for Rowena Fire victims.

=== Closures and evacuations ===
About 8,000 residents were under some kind of evacuation notice, including 1,400 under Level 3 evacuation orders. Level 1 and 2 evacuations were issued south of the Columbia River, southeast of the Rowena Fire into The Dalles, and west of Rowena. Level 3 evacuations were issued in Rowena, the Interstate 84 corridor along the Columbia River up to The Dalles, and south of the fire near Sevenmile Hill. The Dalles Middle School opened as an evacuation shelter. Evacuees brought pets, including cats, dogs, and one turtle. The Columbia Gorge Humane Society evacuated several dozen animals from its shelter; they all returned on June 13 and 14.

The Oregon Parks and Recreation Department closed Mayer State Park and the Rowena Crest Viewpoint due to the Rowena Fire. Memaloose State Park temporarily closed on June 11. The parks were also placed under campfire bans on June 12. Despite the closure, people were reported in Mayer State Park to observe the Rowena Fire. The Gorge Ride, a bicycling event that had about 500 people sign up, was canceled.

On June 11, Interstate 84 was closed between Mosier and The Dalles (mileposts 64–82). It reopened early morning on June 12 after a ten-hour closure. The closure caused traffic backups in Hood River, Oregon and Bingen, Washington, and one local commuter reported a three-hour drive between Hood River and The Dalles. The Port of Hood River advised residents of potential traffic on the Hood River–White Salmon Interstate Bridge. After reopening, drivers on Interstate 84 were told to remain cautious. U.S. Route 30 was closed in the same area, initially between Hood River and The Dalles and later the Rowena lookout and Adeline Way in The Dalles. Hazard tree removal between October 6 and 30, 2025, led to the Oregon Department of Transportation advising residents to expect delays, slow lanes, and shoulder closures. A portion of U.S. Route 30 is designated as the Columbia River Highway and is a National Historic Landmark; a portion was damaged after the Rowena Fire, remaining open only to local traffic as crews repaired damage. Several thousand feet of wooden guard rails were destroyed, initially added for "historic character", which resulted in a longer repair process. It fully reopened in late July 2026. The Federal Aviation Administration (FAA) issued a temporary flight restriction 6,500 feet (2,000 m) above the fire between June 11 and 13 for aerial firefighting operations.

=== Environmental impacts ===
Residents in the Rowena Crest Manor were advised to drink and cook with bottled water because parts of the water system belonging to the Tooley Water District lost pressure, so harmful contaminants from burned structures may have entered water supplies. Potable and bottled water were provided at The Dalles Middle School. Septic systems in the Rowena Crest Manor were also compromised. Eighteen septic systems required repairs. Damage to water sources prompted officials to caution residents who used private wells. Toxic hazards, including the carcinogenic asbestos, prompted state and county officials to advise resident not to conduct debris cleanup without professional assistance. Wind pushed smoke east, impacting Arlington and Moro, Oregon and Kennewick and Walla Walla, Washington.

The brisk expansion of the Rowena Fire led to low burn severity in most areas on United States Forest Service (USFS) land, leaving most understory vegetation minimally burned. The fire damaged plants early in the growing season, meaning several damaged species of plants retained enough energy to regrow in the following weeks. Tall wooly buckwheat, oceanspray, and other various shrubs had regrown new shoots by August 2025. During the Rowena Fire, firefighters saved an injured baby fawn. Several house pets were killed and injured, although a KGW crew in an evacuation zone saved an injured kitten that fully recovered in early September 2025.

== Growth and containment table ==
| Date | Area burned | Personnel | Containment | Ref. |
|---|---|---|---|---|
| June 12 | 3,500 acres (1,400 ha; 14 km^{2}) | Unknown | | |
| June 13 | 3,831 acres (1,550 ha; 15.50 km^{2}) | 453 | | |
| June 14 | 3,858 acres (1,561 ha; 15.61 km^{2}) | 592 | | |
| June 15 | 3,636 acres (1,471 ha; 14.71 km^{2}) | 726 | | |
| June 16 | 3,570 acres (1,440 ha; 14.4 km^{2}) | 668 | | |
| June 17 | 3,570 acres (1,440 ha; 14.4 km^{2}) | 668 | | |
| June 18 | 3,700 acres (1,500 ha; 15 km^{2}) | 588 | | |
—
| June 24 | 3,700 acres (1,500 ha; 15 km^{2}) | 73 | | |
| June 25 | 3,700 acres (1,500 ha; 15 km^{2}) | Unknown | | |

== See also ==
- 2024 Oregon wildfires
- 2025 United States wildfires
- Burdoin Fire
- Eagle Creek Fire
- Substation Fire
