= Flat Fire (2025) =

2025 wildfire in Oregon

- Part of the 2025 Oregon wildfires
- Date: August 21, 2025 – Present
- Location: Culver, Oregon
- Coordinates: 44°30′47″N 121°21′16″W

Statistics
- Perimeter: 7% contained
- Burned area: 23,380 acres (9,462 ha)

Impacts
- Structures destroyed: 6

Ignition
- Cause: Undetermined

Map
- Location in northern Oregon

The Flat Fire is a wildfire burning near Sisters, Oregon and Culver, Oregon that began on August 21, 2025. As of August 29, the fire burned 23,380 acres (9,462 ha) and was 7% contained.

The cause of the fire is currently under investigation.

== Progression ==
The Flat Fire was first reported on August 21, 2025, at around 4:29 pm PST about 7 miles west of Culver, Oregon.

On August 24, a red flag warning was issued for the fire.

== Impact ==
Nearly 4,000 homes were placed under evacuation orders near Sisters, Oregon.

4 homes and 6 buildings were destroyed by the fire.

The Office star, Rainn Wilson and his family evacuated their Oregon home due to the fire on August 26, 2025.

== See also ==
- 2025 Oregon wildfires
- List of Oregon wildfires
