= 2025 Oregon wildfires =

Natural disasters in the USA

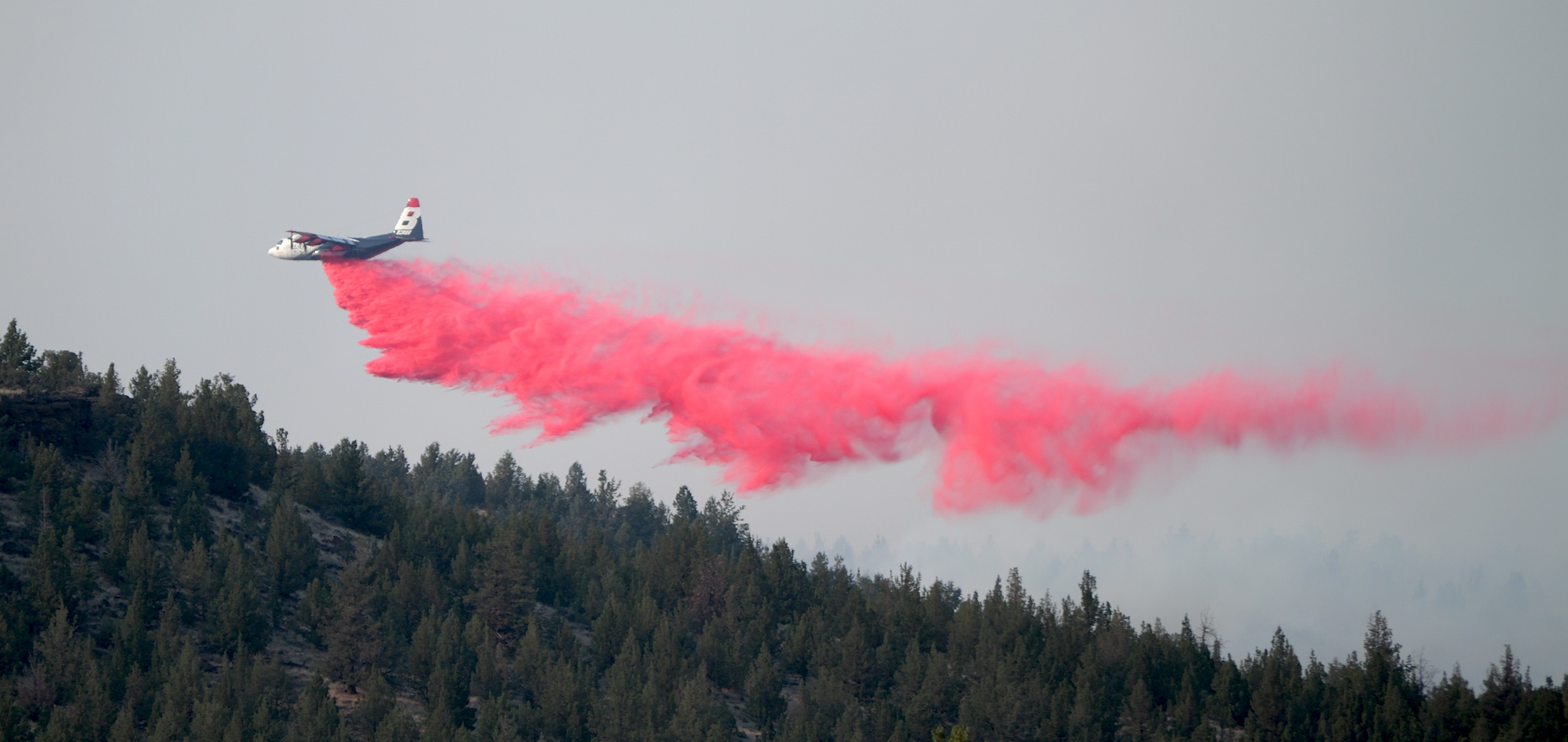
- An air tanker drops fire retardant on the Alder Springs Fire on June 16, 2025

Statistics
- Total area: 338,551 acres (137,007 ha) (as of Oct 11, 2025)

Impacts
- Structures destroyed: 205

The 2025 Oregon wildfire season was a series of wildfires that burned throughout the U.S. state of Oregon.

On May 7, Governor Tina Kotek signed a declaration declaring May “Wildfire Awareness Month”. The season is expected to be similarly destructive as the 2024 season, the most destructive in history. On May 27, Senator Ron Wyden criticized cuts to NOAA under the second presidency of Donald Trump and other federal firefighting resources like the Forest Service, framing the agencies as nonpartisan and the cuts as not warranted. The Oregon Department of Forestry (ODF) set the start date for the season as June 1, but forecasts showed unseasonably hot and dry weather could start fires before the date.

By season end, Oregon wildfires burned 338,551 acres in 2025, which was under the 10-year average, and much less than the 2024 Oregon wildfire season. While acreage was much lower compared to recent years, over 205 structures were lost to wildfires in Oregon in 2025.

== Background ==
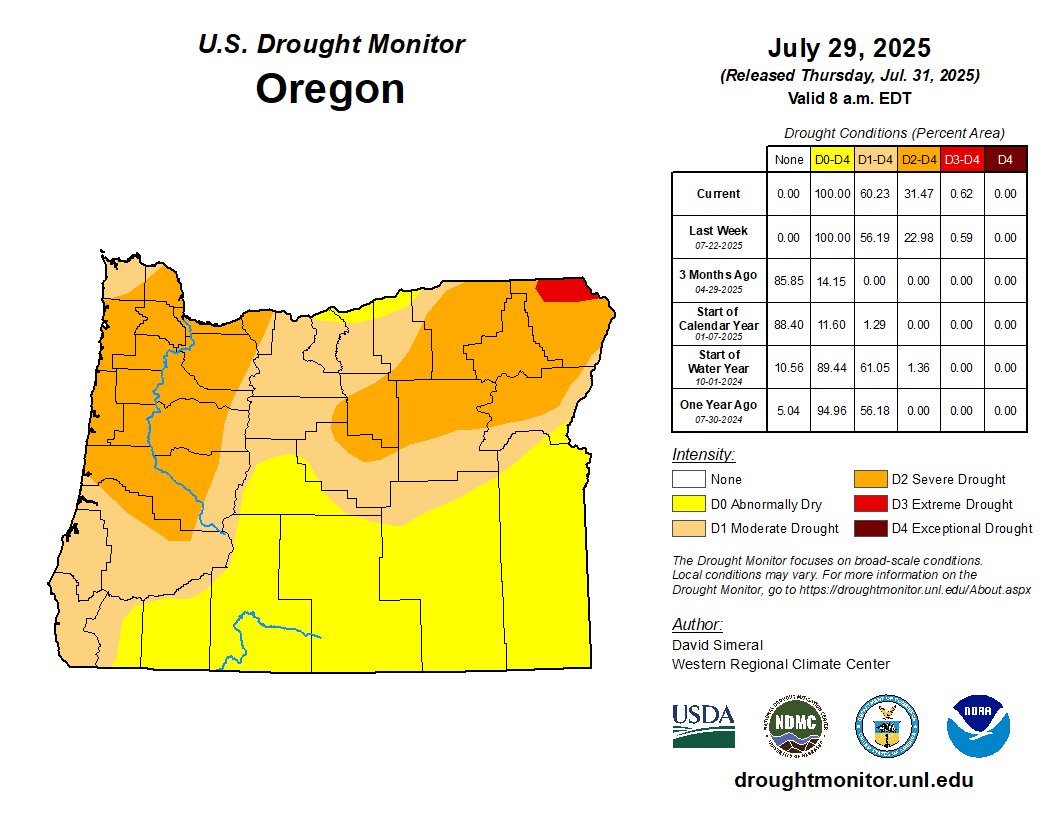
Oregon Drought Monitor on July 29, 2025

"Fire season" in Oregon typically begins in mid-May and ends with the first rains that normally begins in late September. Drought, snowpack levels, and local weather conditions play a role in Oregon's fire season, particularly in Eastern and Southwest Oregon. During peak fire season from July to September, most wildfires are caused by lightning, while ignitions in the early and later parts of the season are related to humans. Warm, dry conditions in summer heighten the wildfire risk. After over 100 years of fire suppression and prevention of all fires, there is now an abundance of fuel. Climate change is leading to a reduced snowpack with an earlier and reduced snowmelt, so there is a higher risk for areas that receive wildfires.

== List of wildfires ==
The following is a list of fires that burned more than 1,000 acres (400 ha), or produced significant structural damage or casualties.

| Name | County | Acres | Start date | Containment date (Note: Containment means that fire crews have established and secured control lines around the fire's perimeter. These lines are artificial barriers, like trenches or cleared vegetation, designed to stop the fire's spread, or natural barriers like rivers. Containment reflects progress in managing the fire but does not necessarily mean the fire is starved of fuel, under control, or put out.) | Notes | Ref |
|---|---|---|---|---|---|---|
| Butte Creek | Wheeler | 1,776 | May 25 | May 30 | First non-prescribed or debris burn in 2025. Burned 9 miles (14 km) north of Clarno and prompted evacuations for Mosier. | |
| Rowena | Wasco | 3,700 | June 11 | June 25 | Closed Interstate 84, evacuations for The Dalles, Kotek invokes Emergency Conflagration Act. Portion of Washington State Route 14 closed. At least 2,000 residential structures under evacuation notices. 56 residences and 91 secondary structures destroyed as of 6/16. | |
| Ferry | Gilliam and Sherman | 10,458 | June 11 | June 19 | Burned in Cottonwood Canyon State Park near State Route 206. Evacuations near Highway 206. | |
| Alder Springs | Jefferson | 3,279 | June 16 | June 30 | Quickly growing fire that burned near Crooked River Ranch on the Crooked River National Grassland. Evacuations issued for portions of Jefferson and Deschutes Counties. Oregon State Fire Marshal mobilizes structure protection resources under Emergency Conflagration Act for second time in a week. | |
| Wolf Hollow | Gilliam | 1,200 | June 17 | June 17 | Started by a pickup truck. Burned Conservation Reserve Program fields and grassland. | |
| Black Canyon | Lake | 1,584 | July 1 | July 5 | Lightning-caused. Burned near Hart Mountain National Antelope Refuge. | |
| Cold Springs | Umatilla | 2,489 | July 2 | | Burned near Hat Rock, one home has been destroyed and threatened 15 to 30 structures. | |
| Elk | Klamath County | 2,637 | July 8 | August 6 | Cause under investigation. Burned 8 miles (13 km) north of Bonanza. Prompted a closure area for parts of Fremont-Winema National Forest. | |
| Willow | Crook | 4,417 | July 9 | August 4 | Lightning-caused. Burned 20 miles (32 km) south of Paulina. | |
| Cram | Jefferson, Wasco | 95,736 | July 13 | July 29 | Human-caused. Burning 15 miles (24 km) north of Madras. 4 homes and 2 other structures have been destroyed. | |
| Helix | Umatilla | 3,472 | July 14 | July 15 | A brush fire started in a wheat field near Helix and burned to the Oregon-Washington border. Multiple departments from both states responded. A burn-over destroyed a Milton-Freewater Rural Fire Department engine, and one firefighter was treated and released for smoke inhalation. | |
| Black Hills | Malheur | 4,958 | July 17 | July 19 | Undetermined cause. Burned 10 miles (16 km) southeast of Burns Junction. | |
| Mendiola Road | Malheur | 1,641 | July 18 | July 19 | Undetermined cause. Burned 3 miles (4.8 km) west of Adrian. | |
| Kinkade | Morrow | Unknown | July 18 | July 18 | Four fires started almost simultaneously in Boardman, one by a lawnmower, and one suspicious in nature. The brush fire near Kinkade Road spread quickly and destroyed five homes and a former church convented to a food pantry. Multiple vehicles were also destroyed. | |
| Butte Creek | Wasco | 2,046 | July 19 | | Undetermined cause. Burned 5 miles (8.0 km) northeast of Simnasho. | |
| Little John | Malheur | 12,934 | July 27 | August 4 | Unknown cause. Burned 8 miles (13 km) west of Arock. | |
| Rock Creek | Malheur | 31,960 | July 29 | August 4 | Unknown cause. Burned 12 miles (19 km) southwest of Jordan Valley. | |
| Lost Tom | Malheur | 1,124 | July 29 | July 31 | Unknown cause. Burned 3 miles (4.8 km) west of Huntington. | |
| Doerner Fir | Coos | Unknown | August 16 | Extinguished August 22 | Unknown cause, but unrelated to lightning. Burned the Doerner Fir, decreasing its height by 50 feet (15 m). | |
| Flat | Jefferson | 23,346 | August 21 | | Human-caused. Started west of Culver in hot, windy conditions. Three structural tasks forces sent under Conflagration act. | |
| Emigrant | Lane, Douglas | 33,500 | August 24 | December 16 | Lightning-caused. Burned 24 miles (39 km) northwest of Oakridge. Closed several recreational sites. | |
| Marks Creek | Crook | 1,718 | September 2 | | Unknown cause. Burned 18 miles (29 km) east of Prineville. Prompted evacuations and closed part of Ochoco National Forest. | |
| Kelsey Peak | Curry, Josephine | 1,039 | September 3 | | Lightning-caused. Burning 14 miles (23 km) west of Glendale. | |
| Moon Complex | Curry | 19,520 | September 4 | March 9, 2026 | Lightning-caused. Prompted evacuations and burned 11 miles (18 km) northeast of Agness. | |
| Black Rock | Wasco | 43,842 | September 4 | | Lightning-caused. Threatened thirty-five homes about 13 miles (21 km) west of Fossil. | |

Perimeters of 2025 Oregon wildfires (map data)

== See also ==
- 2025 United States wildfires
