= Misfits Bar and Lounge =

Defunct bar in Portland, Oregon, U.S.

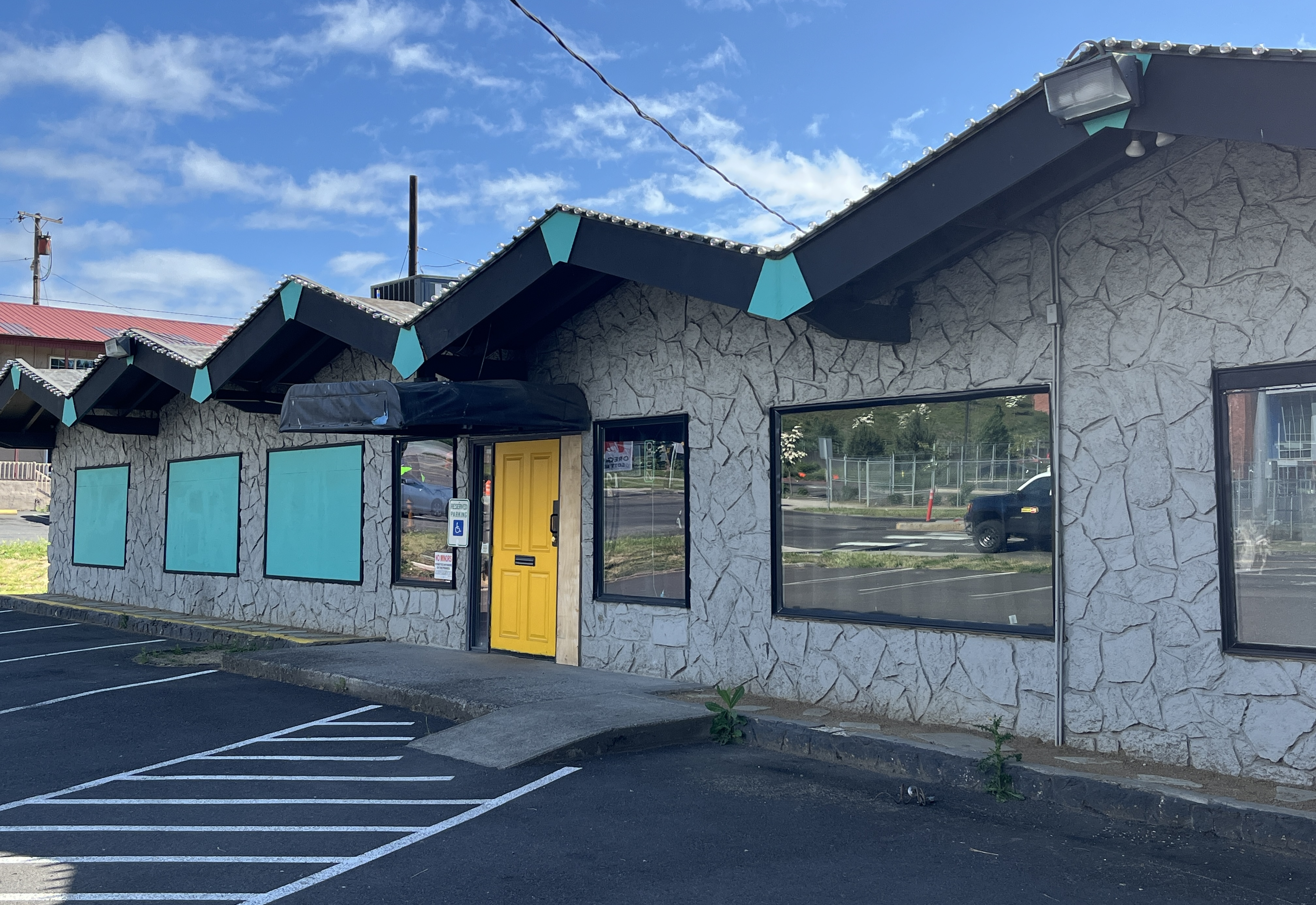
- The bar's exterior, 2025
- Interactive map of Misfits Bar and Lounge

Restaurant information
- Established: 2022
- Closed: May 2025
- Owners: David Elderton; Sophie Garibbo
- Location: 2530 Northeast 82nd Avenue, Portland, Multnomah, Oregon, 97220, United States
- Coordinates: 45.5406°N 122.5785°W

Misfits Bar and Lounge (stylized as Misfits Bar + Lounge) was an LGBTQ-friendly bar in Portland, Oregon, United States. It operated on 82nd Avenue in Northeast Portland's Madison South neighborhood and hosted various events such as burlesque and drag performances, open mics for comedians, and viewing parties for television shows. After purchasing the dive bar and music venue Eastside Bar & Grill in 2022, owners David Elderton and Sophie Garibbo transitioned the space into Misfits over a few months and announced the new name on New Year's Eve (December 31). The business received some backlash, with the owners experiencing homophobia and event performers and producers being cyberbullied. The bar closed in May 2025.

== Description ==
The LGBTQ-friendly Misfits Bar and Lounge operated on 82nd Avenue at Russell Street in Northeast Portland's Madison South neighborhood. It hosted concerts, karaoke, variety shows, and various "inclusive" events such as burlesque shows featuring transgender performers, cabaret and drag shows, open mics for comedians, and RuPaul's Drag Race viewing parties. "Drag Out the Hot Ones" was Misfits' signature drag event. The bar's billiard table was free to use on Thursdays. Portland Monthly said Misfits had the largest parking lot of the city's LGBTQ bars. Misfits' logo had robin egg blue-colored text over the "progress" version of the rainbow flag.

One of the co-owners' namesake cocktail was the Sophie Juice, a purple-colored drink with blueberry Smirnoff vodka, blue curaçao, and cranberry juice. The food menu included burgers (including a vegetarian option), chicken tenders, and onion rings.

== History ==
Co-owners David Elderton and Sophie Garibbo operated Misfits in the space that previously housed the dive bar and music venue Eastside Bar & Grill. The duo began exploring options to open a restaurant in February 2020, just prior to the start of the COVID-19 pandemic, and became interested in Eastside after attending an event with the longstanding comedy series "The Real Comedy Spot" featuring Tyrone and Courtenay Collins, the founders of the NW Black Comedy Festival. Elderton and Garibbo purchased Eastside in September 2022, then "opened quietly after a slow transition over the course of a few months", according to Eater Portland. Elderton managed business and entertainment operations and Garibbo oversaw bar and kitchen logistics.

Drag queens announced the business's name change on New Year's Eve (December 31) in 2022. Elderton and Garibbo chose the name "Misfits" because it resonated with friends and acted as a "calling card". Misfits became a "queer hangout", joining Escape Bar & Grill and the gay strip club Fuzzy Navels as the few LGBTQ establishments in the area. Even before the name change, the business received an online "homophobic backlash". The owners experienced homophobia, while the entertainers and event producers were subjected to cyberbullying for working at Misfits. According to Eater Portland, a group "organized a protest at Eastside following the ownership change, soon after the bar started hosting drag, and other Facebook users have targeted producers behind some of the bar's events, using slurs directed at LGBTQ+ people and Black people."

=== Events ===
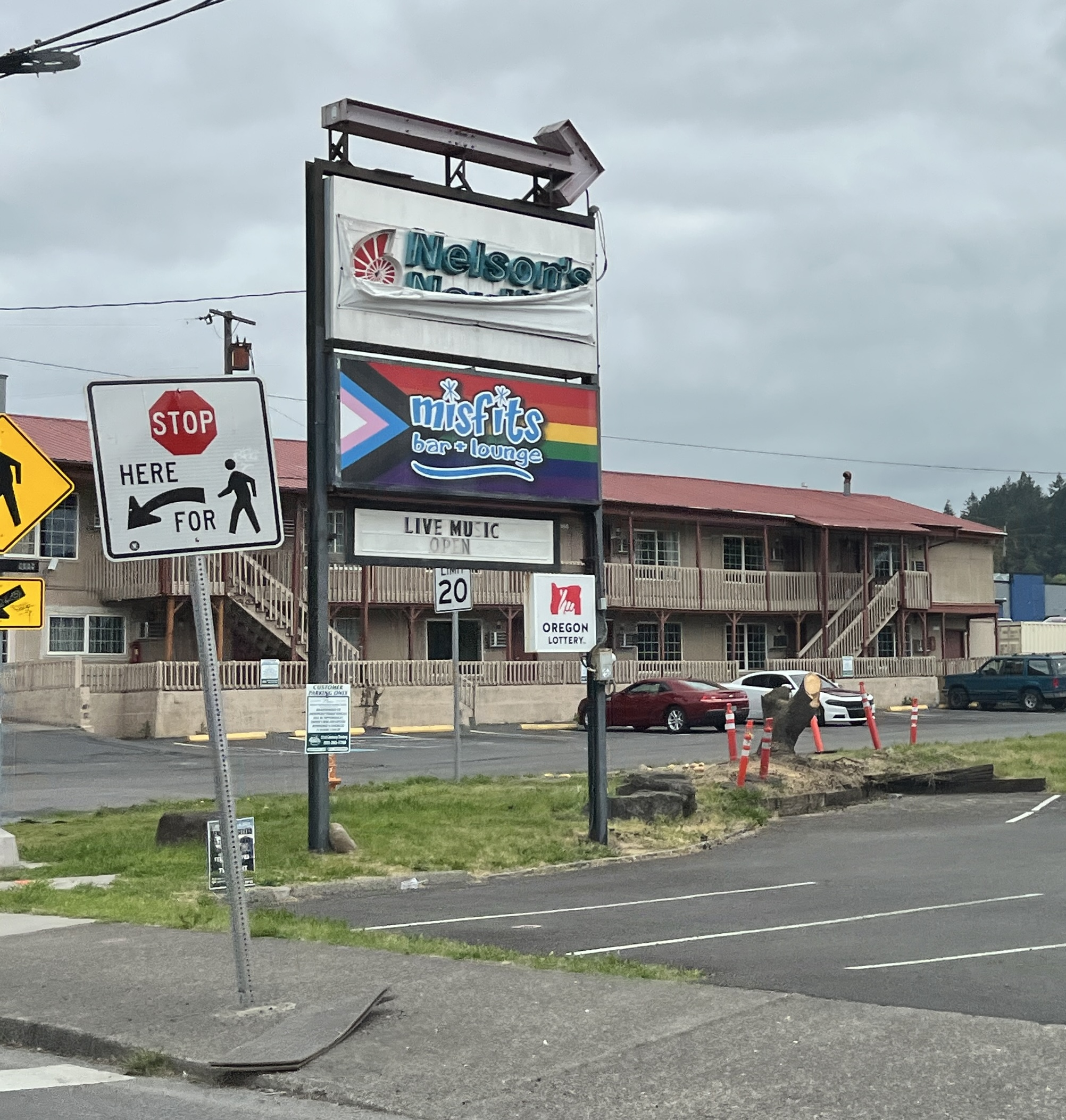
Sign for the bar, 2025

Elderton kept Eastside's "The Real Comedy Spot" series and worked to diversify the types of events hosted at Misfits. As of April 2023, he and Garibbo were planning to host a Pride barbecue and party in July, either in the front parking lot or an adjacent open space. The event was expected to be among the only Pride-related events in East Portland.

In August 2023, The Oregonian described plans for Shobi Dahl, the co-founder and former chief executive officer of Dave's Killer Bread, to perform as drag persona Mona Trombona at Misfits, Escape Bar & Grill, and Funhouse Lounge in September. Dahl planned to dress as Dorothy Gale from The Wizard of Oz (1939), a "sexy" version of Mrs. Claus, Princess Peach from the animated film The Super Mario Bros. Movie (2023), and a "gender-bent" Prince from "Purple Rain".

In conjunction with Pride, which in 2024 was celebrated locally in July, Misfits hosted Diana Fire's drag show Under the Covers, featuring performances to covers, mashups, parodies, and remixes of songs. The bar also hosted Dadfest!, a two-day drag king festival co-hosted by Ed Du'Bull, UmBruh, Tomboy, and WolfgangX. The Portland chapter of the Sisters of Perpetual Indulgence organized a variety show for February 2025 hosted by drag entertainer Coco Jem Holiday and featuring performances by Bolivia Carmichaels and other local artists.

=== Reception and closure ===
Thom Hilton included Misfits in Eater Portland's 2024 overview of the city's "liveliest" LGBTQ bars and nightclubs.

In April 2025, Misfits closed temporarily for repair work. In an announcement, the owners acknowledged that business had been "extremely low" in recent months. Days later, the owners said a drag performance being promoted might be the bar's last. Despite hosting a fundraiser to continue operating, the bar closed in May 2025. In the closure announcement, Elderton said he was sad to see another space for LGBTQ people close. He also said the bar could possibly re-open with a new business partner.

== See also ==
- List of defunct restaurants of the United States
