= Ah Pah Creek =

- Location within California

Location
- Country: United States
- State: California
- County: Humboldt County

Physical characteristics
- Source
  - coordinates: 41.407998°N 123.99826°W
- Mouth
  - location: Klamath River
  - coordinates: 41.420649°N 123.940707°W
- Length: 5.25 mi (8.45 km)

Ah Pah Creek is a stream in the U.S. state of California. The 5.25-mile (8.45 km) long stream is a tributary to the Klamath River.

"Ah Pah" is a name derived from the Yurok language word ʼOhpoh.
