= Anna Bannanas Cafe =

Defunct restaurant in Portland, Oregon, U.S.

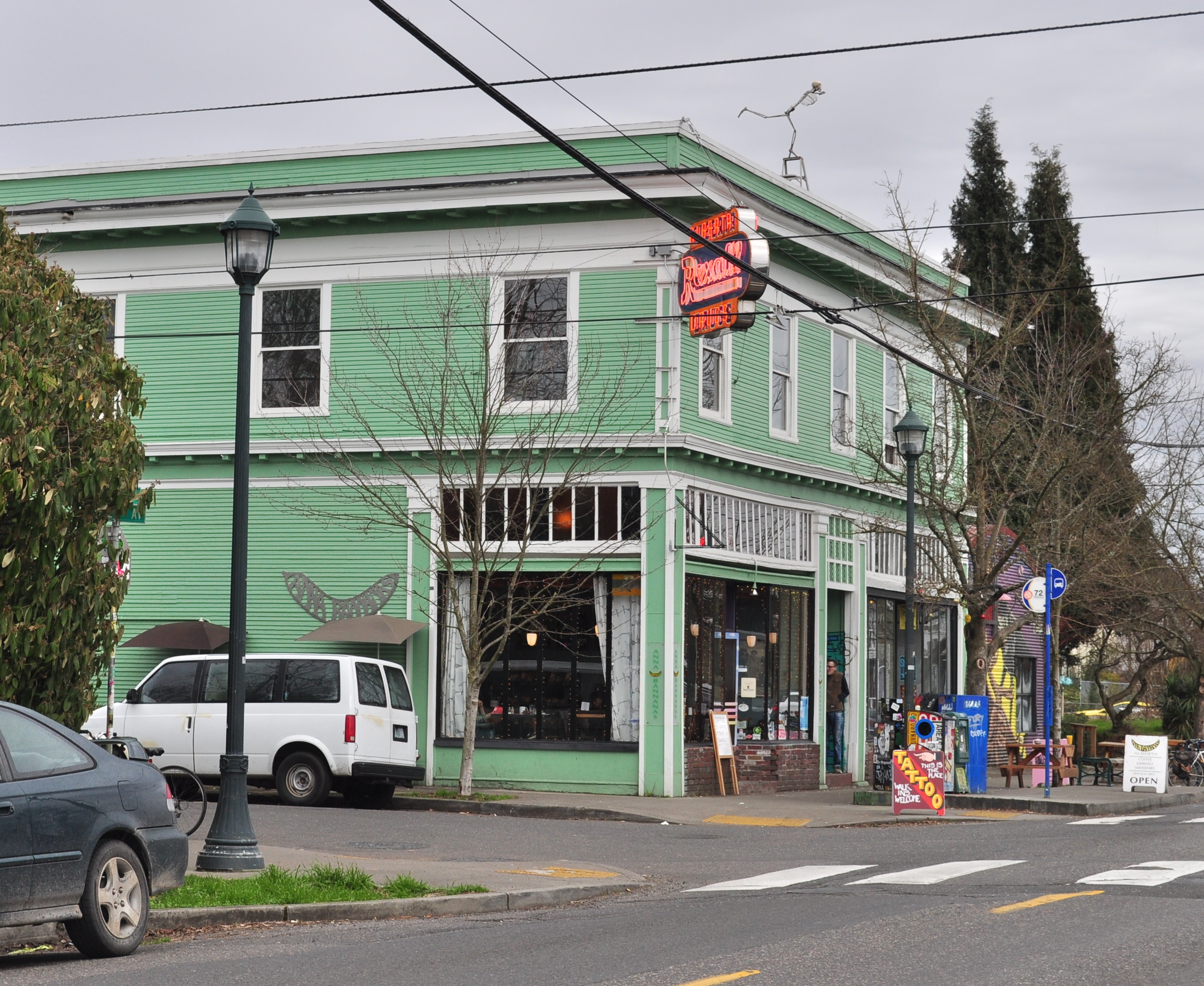
- Exterior of the Alberta Street restaurant in northeast Portland
- Interactive map of Anna Bannanas Cafe

Restaurant information
- Established: 1994
- Closed: January 7, 2025
- Location: 1214 Northwest 21st Avenue, Portland, Oregon, 97209, United States
- Coordinates: 45.5316°N 122.6944°W

Anna Bannanas Cafe, or simply Anna Bannanas, was a coffee shop with multiple locations in Portland, Oregon, United States. In addition to the original location on 21st Avenue in northwest Portland's Northwest District, the business had outposts in north and northeast Portland.

== Description and history ==
There were three locations: the original restaurant on 21st Avenue in northwest Portland's Northwest District, another in north Portland's St. Johns neighborhood, and another on Alberta Street in northeast Portland's Vernon neighborhood. The original shop opened in 1994, and the St. Johns location opened in 2006. The Alberta location closed in 2014.

The business ended operations on January 7, 2025.

== Reception ==
In 2015, Pete Cottell of Willamette Week included Anna Bannanas in the "dive" category of "Where to Coffice in Portland". Jordan Michelman included the cafe in the newspaper's 2016 list of "Five Essential Old-School Portland Cafes". Willamette Week also included Anna Bannanas in a 2017 list of "The Best Secret Nooks and Hidey-Holes in Portland Cafes".

== See also ==
- List of coffeehouse chains
- List of restaurant chains in the United States
