= La Moule =

Defunct bar and restaurant in Portland, Oregon, U.S.

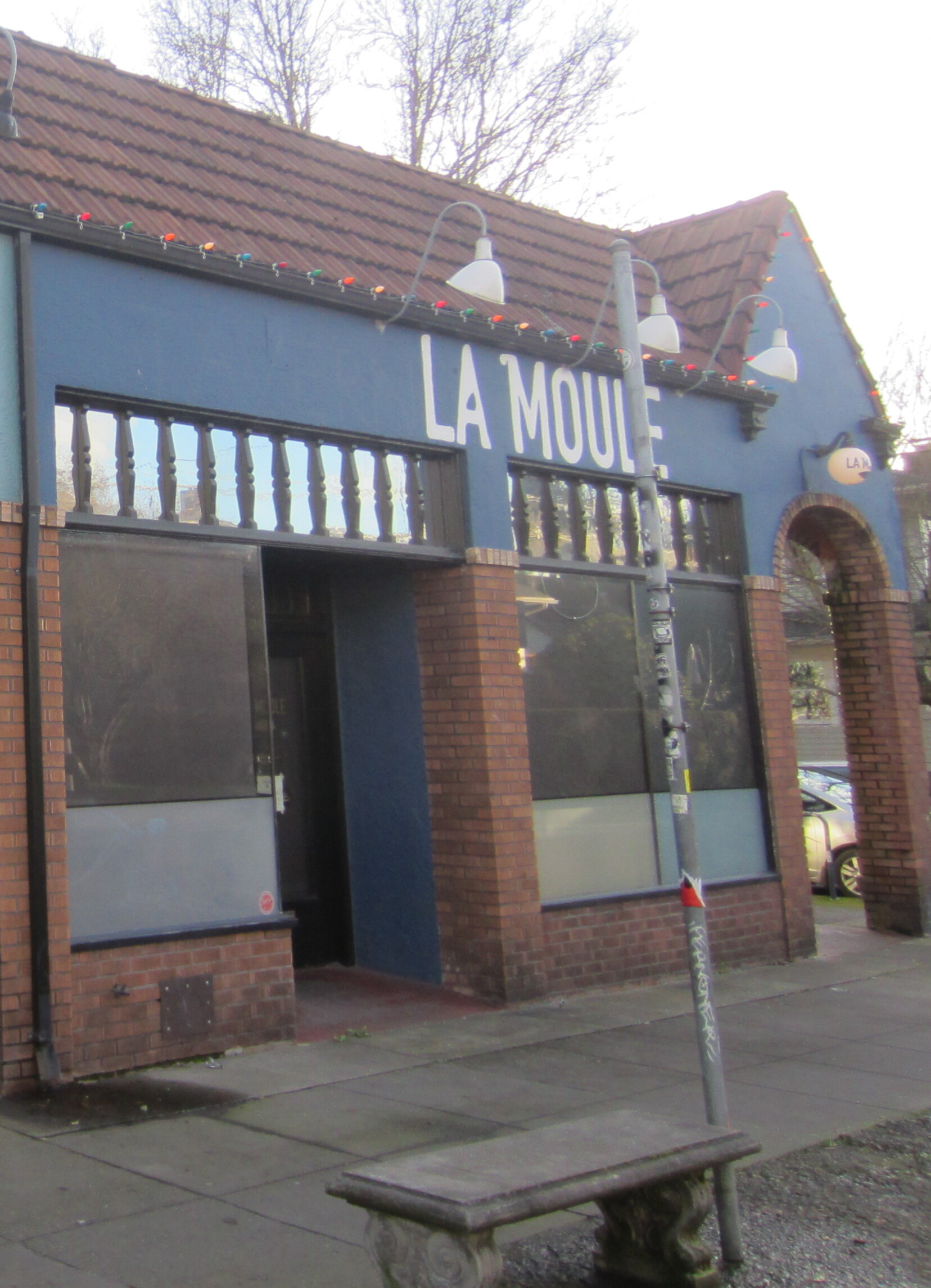
- The restaurant's exterior, 2021
- Interactive map of La Moule

Restaurant information
- Established: 2015
- Closed: 2023
- Location: 2500 Southeast Clinton Street, Portland, Multnomah, Oregon, 97202, United States
- Coordinates: 45.5032°N 122.6402°W

La Moule was a bar and restaurant in Portland, Oregon. It operated from 2015 to 2023. Aaron Barnett was the chef and a co-owner, alongside Tommy Klus.

== Description ==
La Moule operated on Clinton Street in Southeast Portland's Hosford-Abernethy neighborhood. According to Condé Nast Traveler, "This bar, a favorite among restaurant-industry types and couples on dates, spins creative spirits and botanical liqueurs into well-balanced cocktails." The menu included mussels and chicken liver mousse.

== History ==
The bar opened in 2015, in the space previously occupied by Savoy Tavern. La Moule was described as a "sister" establishment to St. Jack.

La Moule closed permanently in 2023. It was replaced by Baker's.

== Reception ==
Alexander Frane included La Moule in Condé Nast Traveler's 2018 list of Portland's thirteen best bars.
