= Davenport (restaurant) =

Restaurant in Portland, Oregon, U.S.

- Interactive map of Davenport

Restaurant information
- Location: 2215 East Burnside Street, Portland, Oregon, 97232, United States
- Coordinates: 45.5230°N 122.6430°W
- Website: davenportpdx.com

Davenport is a restaurant in Portland, Oregon.

== History ==
Kevin Gibson (Evoe) and Kurt Heilemann opened the restaurant in November 2013. Davenport began serving ice cream one month later.

== Reception ==
Michael Russell of The Oregonian gave the restaurant a rating of 'A−'. He also ranked Davenport number 11 in the newspaper's 2025 list of Portland's 40 best restaurants. Bon Appétit included Davenport in a list of "The 50 Nominees for America's Best New Restaurants 2014". Hannah Wallace included the business in Condé Nast Traveler's 2025 list of Portland's 23 best restaurants.
