= Cram Fire =

2025 massive wildfire in Oregon

- Part of the 2025 Oregon wildfires
- Date: July 13, 2025 – July 27, 2025
- Location: Madras, Oregon
- Coordinates: 44°47′48″N 121°56′31″W

Statistics
- Burned area: 95,736 acres (38,743 ha)

Ignition
- Cause: Undetermined

Map
- Perimeter of Cram Fire (map data)
- Location in northern Oregon

The Cram Fire was a massive wildfire burning near Madras, Oregon that began on July 13, 2025. The fire burned 95,736 acres (38,743 ha).

The cause is currently under investigation.

== Events ==
The Cram Fire was first reported on July 13, 2025, at around 12:55 pm PST. The fire was fully contained on July 27, 2025.

== Impact ==
Evacuation orders for several very rural areas near the fire were issued.

U.S. 97 from mile markers 70 to 76 was closed due to the fire but reopened a few days later on July 15.

== See also ==
- 2025 Oregon wildfires
- List of Oregon wildfires
