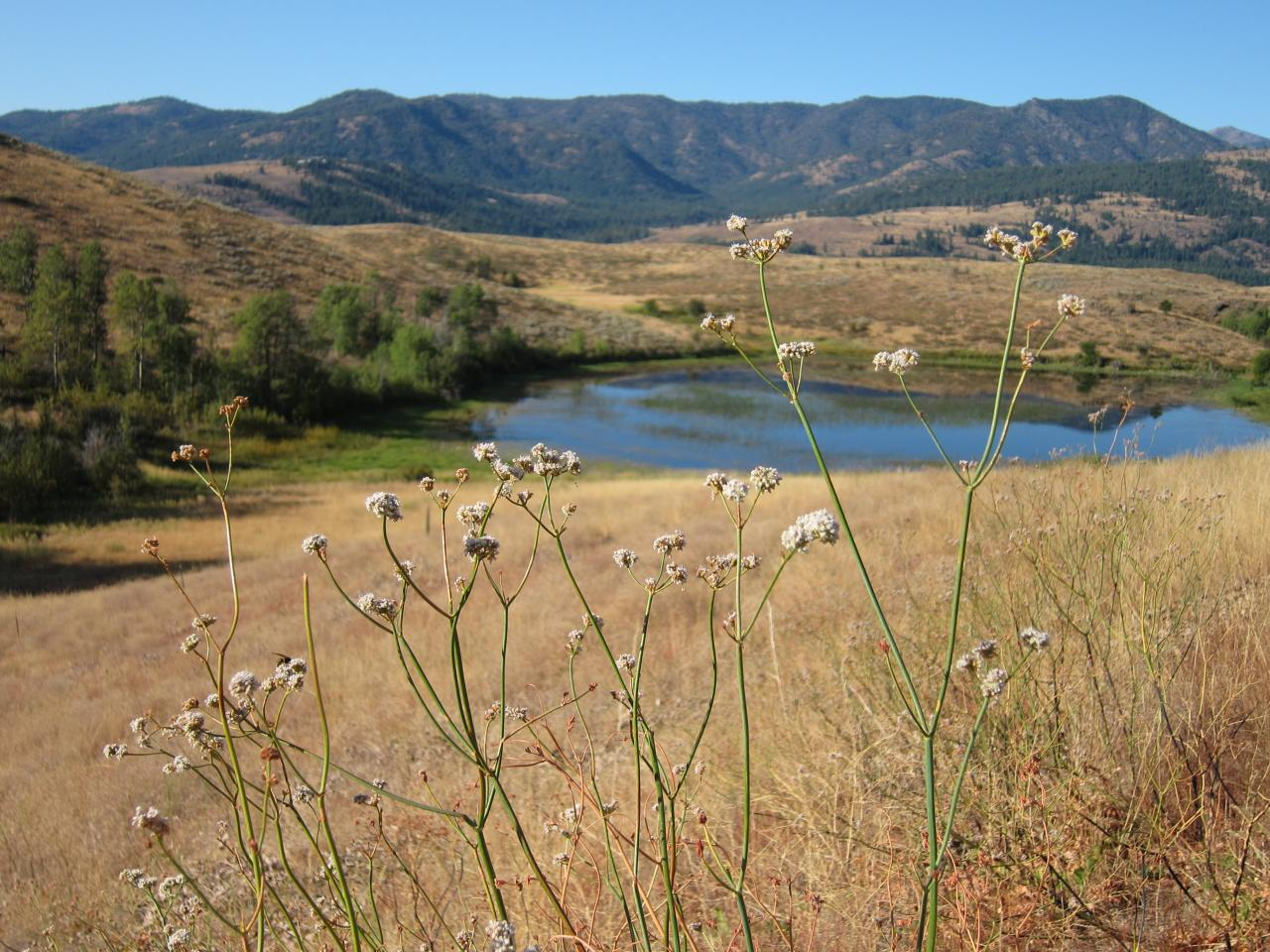

Scientific classification
- Kingdom: Plantae
- Clade: Tracheophytes
- Clade: Angiosperms
- Clade: Eudicots
- Order: Caryophyllales
- Family: Polygonaceae
- Genus: Eriogonum
- Species: E. elatum

Binomial name
- Eriogonum elatum Dougl. ex Benth.

= Eriogonum elatum =

Species of wild buckwheat

Eriogonum elatum is a species of wild buckwheat known by the common name tall woolly buckwheat. It is native to the western United States from California to Idaho. It is a perennial herb varying in size from one half to 1.5 meters in height. Its long leaves are located at the base of the plant and can be quite long for a buckwheat, over 20 centimeters in maximum length. The erect, branching stems are thin and naked and occasionally hollow. The plant produces small to large inflorescences with clusters of tiny flowers in shades of white to dark pink.
