= St. Jack =

Restaurant in Portland, Oregon, U.S.

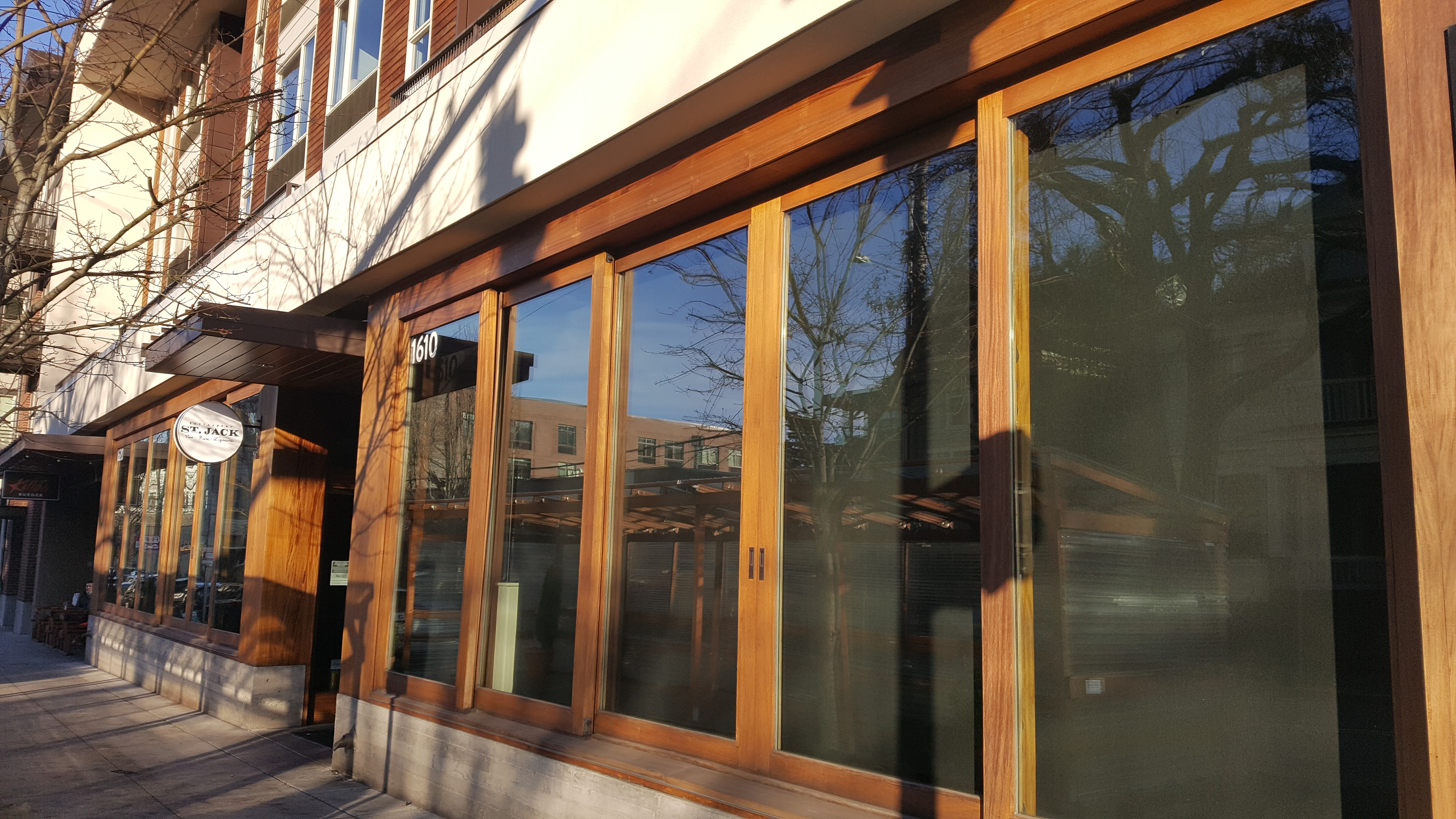
- The restaurant's exterior in 2022
- Interactive map of St. Jack

Restaurant information
- Food type: French
- Location: 1610 Northwest 23rd Avenue, Portland, Oregon, 97210
- Coordinates: 45°32′3.5″N 122°41′55.2″W
- Website: stjackpdx.com

St. Jack is a "Northwest French" restaurant in Portland, Oregon, United States.

== Description ==
St. Jack serves French cuisine. The menu includes chicken liver mousse, roasted bone marrow, and steak frites.

== History ==
The original St. Jack restaurant opened on Clinton Street in southeast Portland's Hosford-Abernethy neighborhood in 2010. The location on Northwest 23rd Avenue opened in 2014, slightly later than the previously planned December 2013 opening. The restaurant was briefly known as St. Jack NW to avoid confusion with the original location, which closed in early 2014.

St. Jack launched a happy hour menu in April 2014; options included duck confit poutine, the Lyonnaise cheese spread cervelle de canut, and the St. Jack burger. The restaurant launched a late night happy hour in 2015. Chef Aaron Barnett opened the "spinoff" restaurant La Moule in mid 2015.

Jacob Harth became St. Jack's chef de cuisine in 2016. The restaurant stopped using plastic straws in 2018, and launched a brunch menu in 2019.

Plans to open a restaurant in Lake Oswego, Oregon, were confirmed in 2019. The restaurant Lac St. Jack closed in 2022.

The business participated in Portland Dining Month in 2026. In 2026, St. Jack was among local restaurants, community organizations, and other businesses that joined the "We Are Rip City" campaign in support of the Moda Center renovation project.

== Reception ==
In 2021, Alex Frane and Brooke Jackson-Glidden included St. Jack in Eater Portland's list of "11 Charming French Restaurants in Portland". Additionally, Frane and Maya MacEvoy included St. Jack in a list of "16 Quintessential Restaurants and Bars in Slabtown", and Jackson-Glidden included St. Jack in a list of "The 38 Essential Restaurants and Food Carts in Portland".

In 2023, chef John Denison was one of 18 Portland industry professionals deemed "rising stars" by the restaurant resource and trade publication StarChefs. Michael Russell ranked St. Jack number 15 in The Oregonian's 2025 list of Portland's 40 best restaurants.

== See also ==
- List of French restaurants
