= 2018 Oregon wildfires =

2018 wildfire season in the U.S. state of Oregon

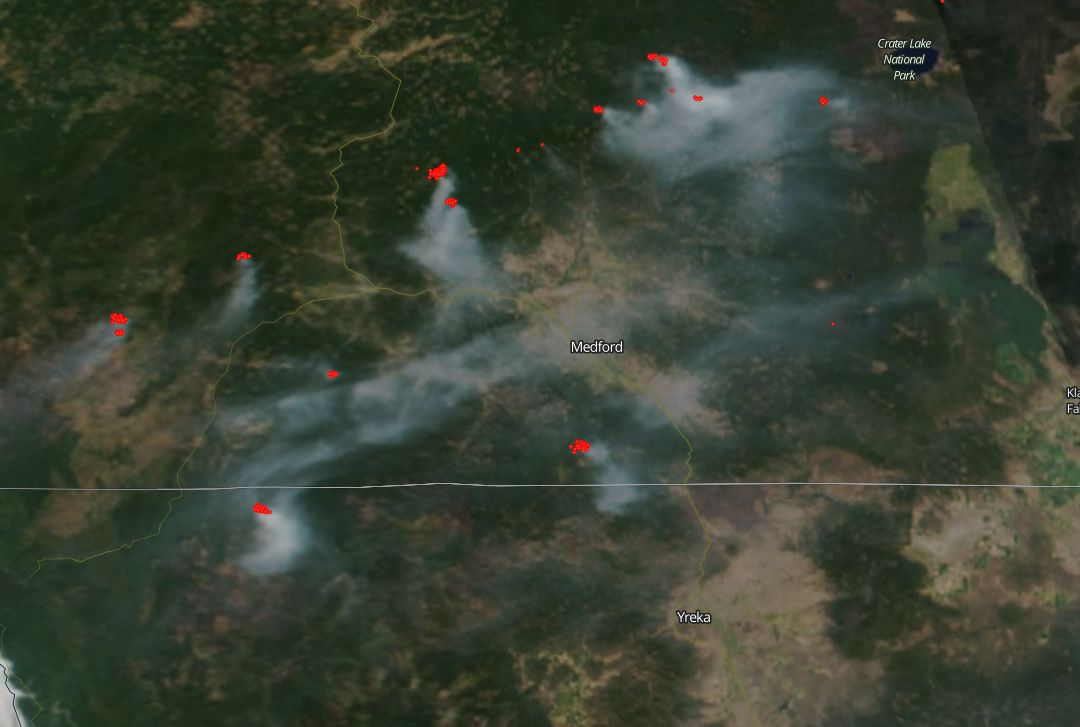
- Thunderstorms over the weekend of July 14-15 brought thousands of lightning strikes to the state of Oregon, starting 150 wildfires. Fires on the Umpqua, Rogue River, Winema, and Siskiyou National Forests are seen in this July 18, 2018, NASA satellite photo.

Statistics
- Total fires: 2,019
- Total area: 897,263 acres (3,631.09 km^{2})

Wildfires in the U.S. state of Oregon in 2018 include the Boxcar Fire, Graham Fire, and Jack Knife Fire.

In July, one person was killed by the Substation Fire, which also destroyed the Charles E. Nelson House.

== Background ==
"Fire season" in Oregon typically begins in mid-May and ends with the first rains that normally begins in late September. Drought, snowpack levels, and local weather conditions play a role in Oregon's fire season, particularly in Eastern and Southwest Oregon. During peak fire season from July to September, most wildfires are caused by lightning, while ignitions in the early and later parts of the season are related to humans. Warm, dry conditions in summer heighten the wildfire risk. After over 100 years of fire suppression and prevention of all fires, there is now an abundance of fuel. Climate change is leading to a reduced snowpack with an earlier and reduced snowmelt, so there is a higher risk for areas that receive wildfires.

== Wildfires ==
The following is a list of fires that burned more than 1,000 acres, or produced significant structural damage or loss of life.

Name	County	Acres	Start date	Containment date (Note: Containment means that fire crews have established and secured control lines around the fire's perimeter. These lines are artificial barriers, like trenches or cleared vegetation, designed to stop the fire's spread, or natural barriers like rivers. Containment reflects progress in managing the fire but does not necessarily mean the fire is starved of fuel, under control, or put out.)	Status	Notes	Ref
Boxcar	Wasco	100,207	June 21, 2018	July 6, 2018	Contained	Lightning-caused. Portions of U.S. Route 197 closed and evacuations issued for Maupin	
Graham	Jefferson	2,175	June 21, 2018	July 4, 2018	Contained	Lightning-caused. Threatened structures and burned near Lake Billy Chinook.	
Jack Knife	Sherman	15,676	June 22, 2018	July 6, 2018	Contained	Lightning-caused. Burned east of Maupin near John Day River.	
Klondike	Josephine	175,258	July 15, 2018	November 6, 2018	Contained	Lightning-caused. Burned near the Illinois River and evacuations issued for Galice, Merlin, and communities along U.S. Route 199.	
Taylor Creek	Josephine	52,839	July 15, 2018		Contained	Lightning-caused. Evacuations near Rogue River and Grants Pass. Portion of Rogue River closed.	
Garner Complex	Josephine	8,886	July 15, 2018	August 14, 2018	Contained	Included Grave Fires, Pleasant Creek Fire, and Spencer Fires. Burned north of Rogue River with evacuations for Wimer.	
Hendrix	Jackson	1,082	July 15, 2018	August 14, 2018	Contained	Lightning-caused. Burned in Little Applegate River area southwest of Ashland. Evacuations for Ruch.	
Miles	Jackson, Douglas	54,334	July 15, 2018		Contained	Sugar Pine, South Umpqua Complex and Miles fire merged	
Timber Crater 6	Klamath	3,126	July 15, 2018	August 16, 2018	Contained	Lightning-caused. Burned in northeast corner of Crater Lake National Park.	
Substation	Wasco	78,425	July 17, 2018	August 2, 2018	Contained	Possibly human-caused. Burned close to The Dalles. Evacuations near Moro and Grass Valley. Killed one person and destroyed the Charles E. Nelson House.	
Long Hollow	Wasco	33,451	July 26, 2018	August 14, 2018	Contained	Caused by farming equipment. Evacuations along the Deschutes River.	
Lake Wallula	Umatilla	12,462	July 29, 2018	July 30, 2018	Contained	Unknown cause. Burned along U.S. Route 730.	
South Valley	Wasco	20,026	August 1, 2018	August 10, 2018	Contained	Human-caused. Evacuations for 500 people south of Dufur. Closed portion of U.S. Route 197 closed.	
Watson	Lake	16,227	August 15, 2018		Contained	Started from a vehicle conducting maintenance on Paradise Creek allotment. Burned in Fremont-Winema National Forest.	
