= South Valley Fire =

2018 wildfire in the U.S. state of Oregon

- Part of the 2018 Oregon wildfires
- Date: August 1, 2018 – August 9, 2018
- Location: Dufur, Wasco County, Oregon, United States

Statistics
- Burned area: 20,026 acres (81 km^{2})

Ignition
- Cause: Human

The South Valley Fire was a human-caused wildfire in Wasco County near Dufur in the U.S. state of Oregon, during the summer of 2018. The fire was one of three fires near Dufur, specifically the Long Hollow Fire and the contained Substation Fire. The South Valley Fire burned 20,026 acres (81 km^{2}). It caused the evacuation of 500 people and threatened 200 homes. It impacted recreational activities along the Deschutes River.

== Events ==
The fire started around 1:30 p.m. on August 1, 2018, near Dufur in Wasco County, Oregon. Firefighters determined it was likely started by humans. Due to high winds and fueled by dry grass, fields, and trees, the fire grew fast, burning almost 3,500 acres (14 km^{2}) by the evening. Level three (go now) evacuations were put in place, and Governor Kate Brown call into action the emergency conflagration act as a result of the fire, sending resources. Highway 197 was closed. The Bureau of Land Management issued an evacuation for areas along the Deschutes River, specifically from Sandy Beach to Macks Canyon. By the evening of August 1, the fire had burned an estimated 6,000 acres (24 km^{2}). The next day, it had grown exponentially to 20,000 acres (81 km^{2}) with 400 people evacuated. A historic barn, built in 1906, was burned by the fire.

Highway 197 reopened the next day, Thursday, August 2, 2018. The fire was contained August 9, 2018.

== Impact ==
The South Valley Fire was one of three fires to have burned in the area, adding to the heavy smoke and evacuations already in place, particularly around the community of Dufur. The fire also impacted recreational activities along the Deschutes River.

=== Evacuations ===
The following areas were under mandatory evacuation by August 1:

- 82000 block of Rail Hollow Road to the forest boundary
- All of Winslow Road and Shell Rock Road
- South of the above zone all the way south to Friend Road
- Dufur Gap Road
- Hix Road to Kingsley Road
- Hwy 197 to forest boundary
- Tygh Ridge Road
- The Deschutes River from Sandy Beach to Macks Canyon
