= Maupin Section Foreman's House =

Historic house in Oregon, United States

- U.S. National Register of Historic Places
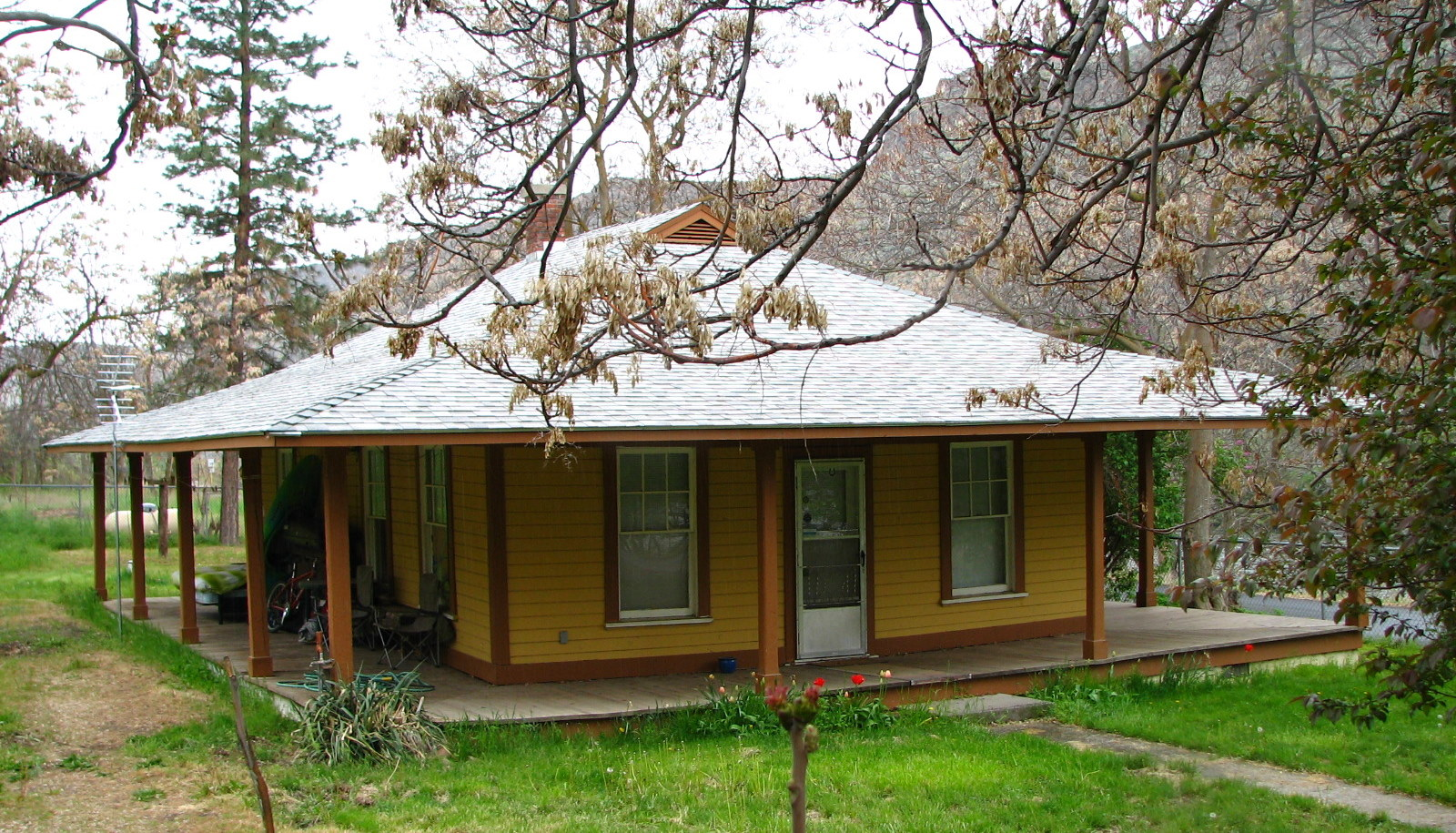
- The Maupin Section Foreman's House in 2009
- Location: 601 Deschutes Access Road; Maupin, Oregon
- Coordinates: 45°10′06″N 121°05′04″W
- Area: 5.7 acres (2.3 ha)
- Built: 1910
- Built by: Des Chutes Railroad Company
- Architect: Union Pacific Railroad
- NRHP reference No.: 06001082
- Added to NRHP: November 29, 2006

The Maupin Section Foreman's House is a historic section house in Maupin, Oregon, United States. It recalls the days of the "Last Great Railroad War" (construction 1909–1911) between the rival transportation empires of E. H. Harriman and James J. Hill, as they raced to build routes up the Deschutes River canyon, connecting the mainlines along the Columbia River to the new markets of Central Oregon. Harriman's Des Chutes Railroad Company built the house to the Union Pacific Common Standard Plan for buildings (with allowed variations) in 1910. It was one of three buildings in the "country combination station" at Maupin, and served as residence for the maintenance of way foreman for the local section of track. The other two buildings of the station (a depot and a bunk residence for the maintenance crew) were demolished by 1968. Most of the Des Chutes Railroad tracks in the canyon were abandoned in 1936, granting Hill the final victory in the race. The road passing in front of the house utilizes the former railroad grade.

The Bureau of Land Management acquired the house in 1968. It was added to the National Register of Historic Places in 2006.

== See also ==
- National Register of Historic Places listings in Wasco County, Oregon
