= Dufur School =

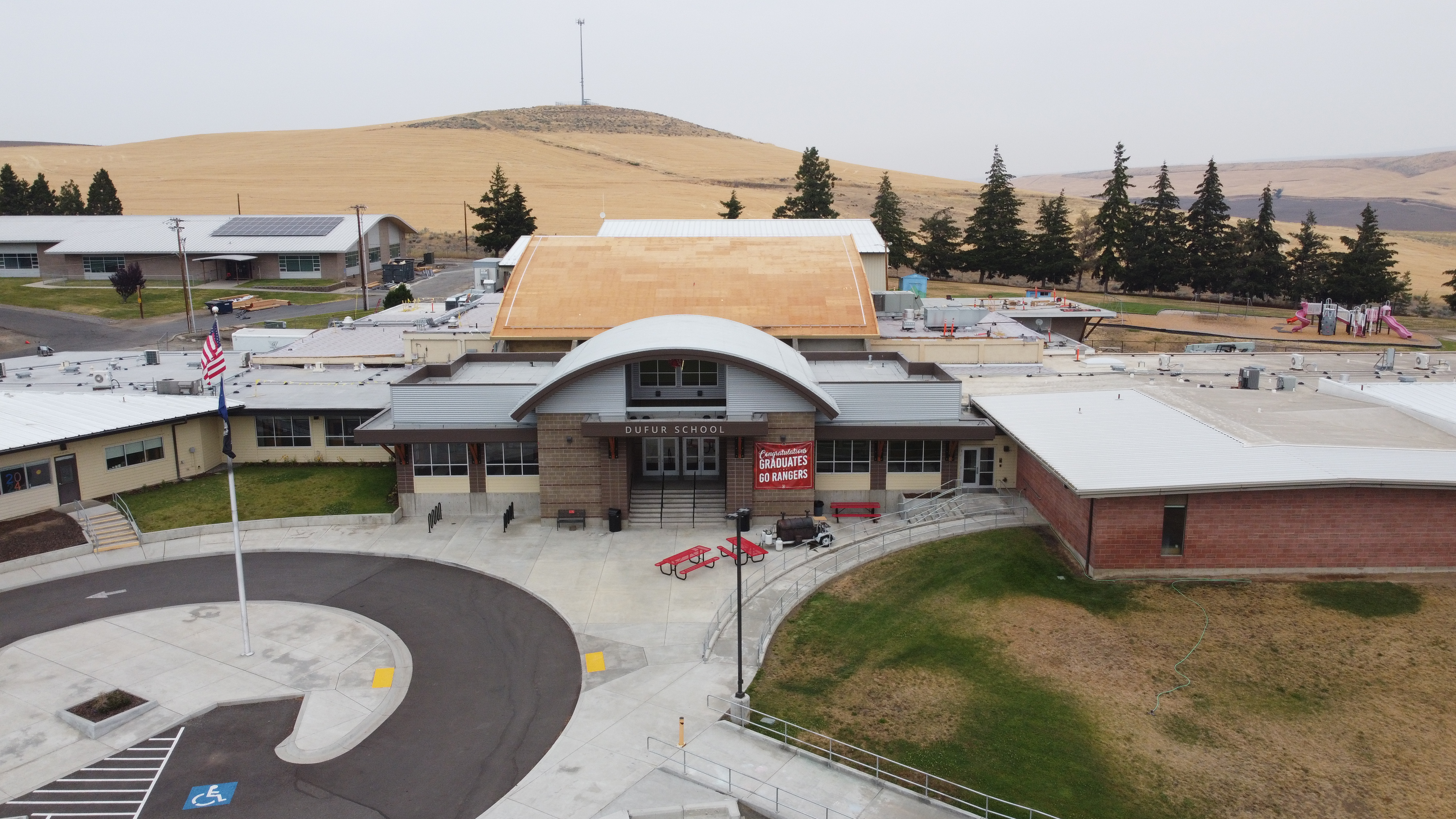
- Dufur School in July, 2024

Location
- 802 NE 5th Street; Dufur, Wasco County, Oregon 97021; United States; 45.4552°N 121.124°W

Information
- Type: Public
- School district: Dufur School District #29
- NCES School ID: 410441001162
- Principal: Bert Wyatt
- Grades: K-12
- Enrollment: 343 (2023–2024)
- Colors: Scarlet and white
- Athletics conference: OSAA Big Sky League 1A-6
- Mascot: Rangers
- Rival: Sherman Junior/Senior High School (Moro, Oregon)
- Website: www.dufur.k12.or.us

Dufur School is a K-12 public school of approximately 280 students in Dufur, Oregon, United States.

== Academics ==
In 2008, 79% of the Dufur High School seniors received their high school diploma. Of 19 students, 15 graduated, 3 dropped out, and 1 received a modified diploma.
