= Dufur School District =

School district in Oregon, USA

Location
- Dufur, Oregon; United States

District information
- Type: Public
- Grades: K–12
- NCES District ID: 4104410

Students and staff
- Enrollment: 280
- District mascot: Rangers
- Colors: Scarlet and White

Other information
- Website: www.dufur.k12.or.us

Dufur School District #29 is a K-12 school district of approximately 280 students, in Dufur, Oregon, United States.

== History ==
In 1953, the Liberty, Boyd, Ramsey, Nansene, Center Ridge, Ireland, Railhollow, Kingsley, Harmony, Friend, and Shell Rock School Districts were merged into the Dufur School District.

== Academics ==
In 2008, 79% of the Dufur High School seniors received their high school diploma. Of 19 students, 15 graduated, 3 dropped out, and 1 received a modified diploma.
