= Boxcar Fire =

2018 wildfire in the U.S. state of Oregon

- Part of the 2018 Oregon wildfires
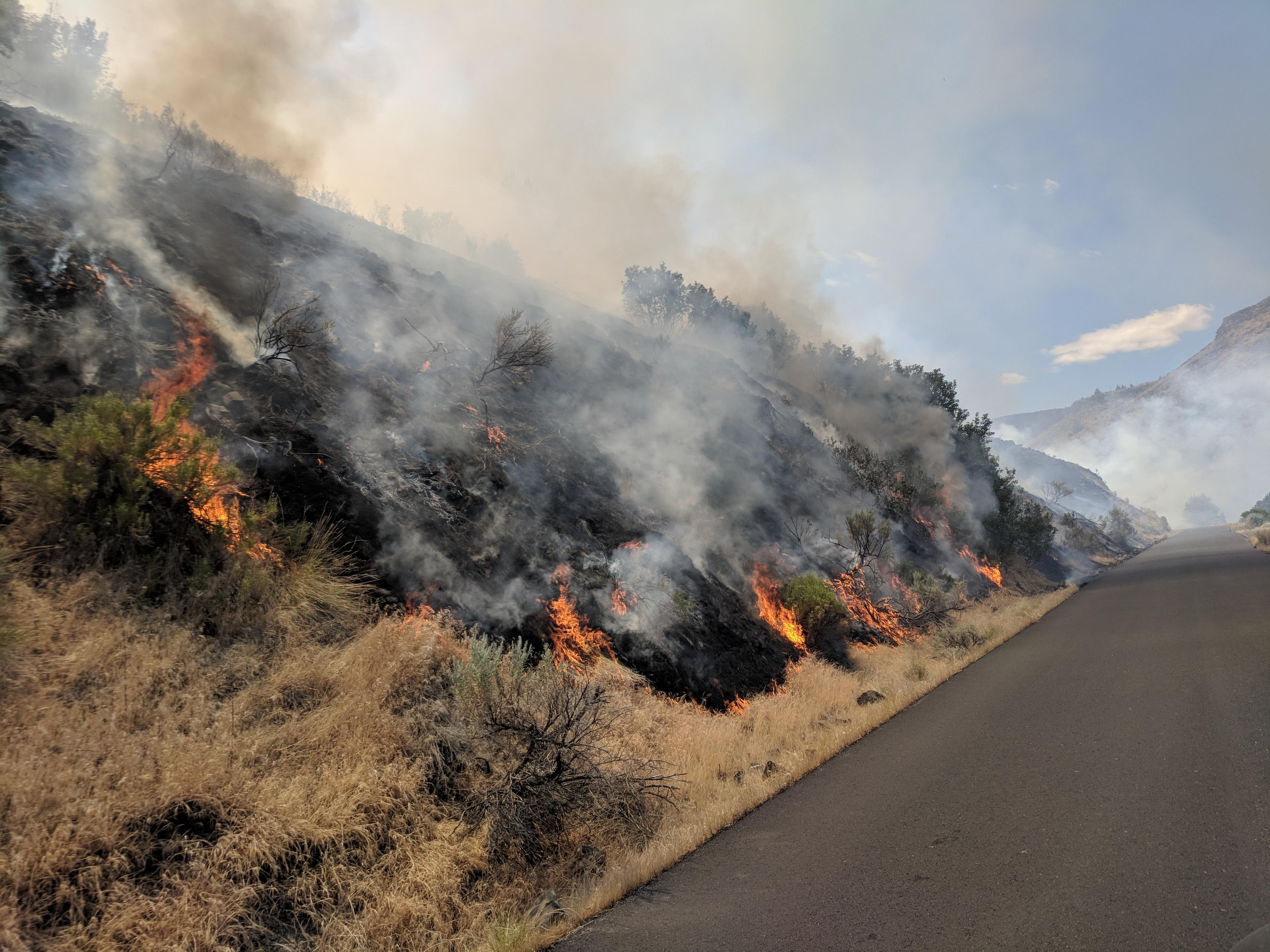
- Boxcar Fire on June 23, 2018
- Date: June 21, 2018 – July 6, 2018
- Location: Maupin, Oregon, United States
- Coordinates: 45.16°N 121.071°W

Statistics
- Burned area: 100,207 acres (406 km^{2})

Map
- Location of fire in Oregon.

The Boxcar Fire was a wildfire one mile southeast of Maupin, Oregon in the United States. The fire started on June 21, 2018 due to a lightning strike and subsequently burned 100,207 acres (406 km^{2}) due to dry, windy conditions in Central Oregon. The fire was one of 70 wildfires started in Oregon due to lightning strikes over a two-day period. The Boxcar Fire was the largest out of three major fires burning in the region, which included the Jack Knife Fire and South Junction Fire. The fire was contained in late June.

== Events ==
The Boxcar Fire was started by a lightning strike around 7:45 a.m. on June 21, 2018, one mile southeast of Maupin, Oregon during a heavy bout of lightning strikes that impacted Central Oregon of the course of two days, which caused almost 70 wildfires.

Fueled by grass and brush, the fire has spread south and east due to gusty winds. By June 23, the fire had expanded to 23,000 acres (93 km^{2}). Of the areas burned, 22,000 acres (89 km^{2}) were private land. Sections of U.S. Route 197 were closed due to efforts by fire crews to contain the blaze. Bakeoven Road was closed for burnout operations.

The fire merged into the South Junction Fire on June 24 and was at 47 percent containment. By the next evening, the fire had grown to 99,170 acres (401 km^{2}).

As of June 27, the fire had burned 100,207 acres (406 km^{2}) and was contained days later.

== Impact ==
The Boxcar Fire impacted the community of Maupin and nearby traffic, causing areas of Highway 197 to be closed.

=== Tourism ===
Harpham Flat Campground was burned by the fire, as well as the accompanying day use area, even though it was reopened to the public with no structural damage. Access areas to the Deschutes River were closed due to the fire, yet the river itself remained open for boating and recreation. Camping was discouraged by authorities in areas between Trout Creek and Maupin, impacting four campgrounds. Fourteen miles of camping areas along the John Day River were closed.
