= Sherman High School =

Sherman High School may refer to one of these U.S. high schools:

- Sherman High School (Moro, Oregon)
- Sherman High School (Texas)
- Sherman High School (Seth, West Virginia)
- Sherman Central School (including the high school), a high school in New York
