= Section house =

Building near railroad for railroad workers

A section house is a building or house-like structure located near or next to a section of railroad used for housing railroad workers, or for the storing and maintenance of equipment for a section of railroad. Section houses were used mainly from the 1890s to the 1960s. By the 1970s, section houses were being slowly phased out. In Canada section houses were usually located right across from the railway station. In the UK, a section house may be a building near a police station, providing collective accommodation for officers.

== Examples ==
=== United States ===
Alaska

- Potter Section House, Potter, Alaska, now housing a small museum with a rotary snow plow and crew cars, located south of Anchorage, Alaska.
- Whitney Section House, built in 1917 in Wasilla, Alaska.

Arizona

- Benson Section House, built by Southern Pacific Railroad in 1880s–'90s in Benson, Arizona.
- Elgin Section House, Elgin, Arizona, built for the now-abandoned Benson-to-Nogales mainline of the New Mexico & Arizona Railroad (later Southern Pacific).
- Patagonia Railroad Section Foreman Residence, built next to the Patagonia Depot in 1904 by New Mexico & Arizona Railroad and moved to its present location in Patagonia, Arizona in 1964.
- Skull Valley Section House, built in the 1920s in Skull Valley, Arizona.
- Wickenburg Section House, built by Atchison, Topeka and Santa Fe Railway in 1925 in Wickenburg, Arizona.

Kansas

- Kansas Pacific Railway Section House, an 1879 stone railroad superintendent's residence, one of only two remaining Kansas Pacific Railroad structures. Wallace, Kansas.

Oregon

- Maupin Section Foreman's House, built in 1910 in Maupin, Oregon. Now used as museum commemorating the Deschutes Railroad War

South Carolina

- Little Mountain Section House in Little Mountain, built in 1890 by the Columbia, Newberry and Laurens Railroad

=== United Kingdom ===
A section house is a house near a police station, providing collective accommodation for officers.

== Gallery ==
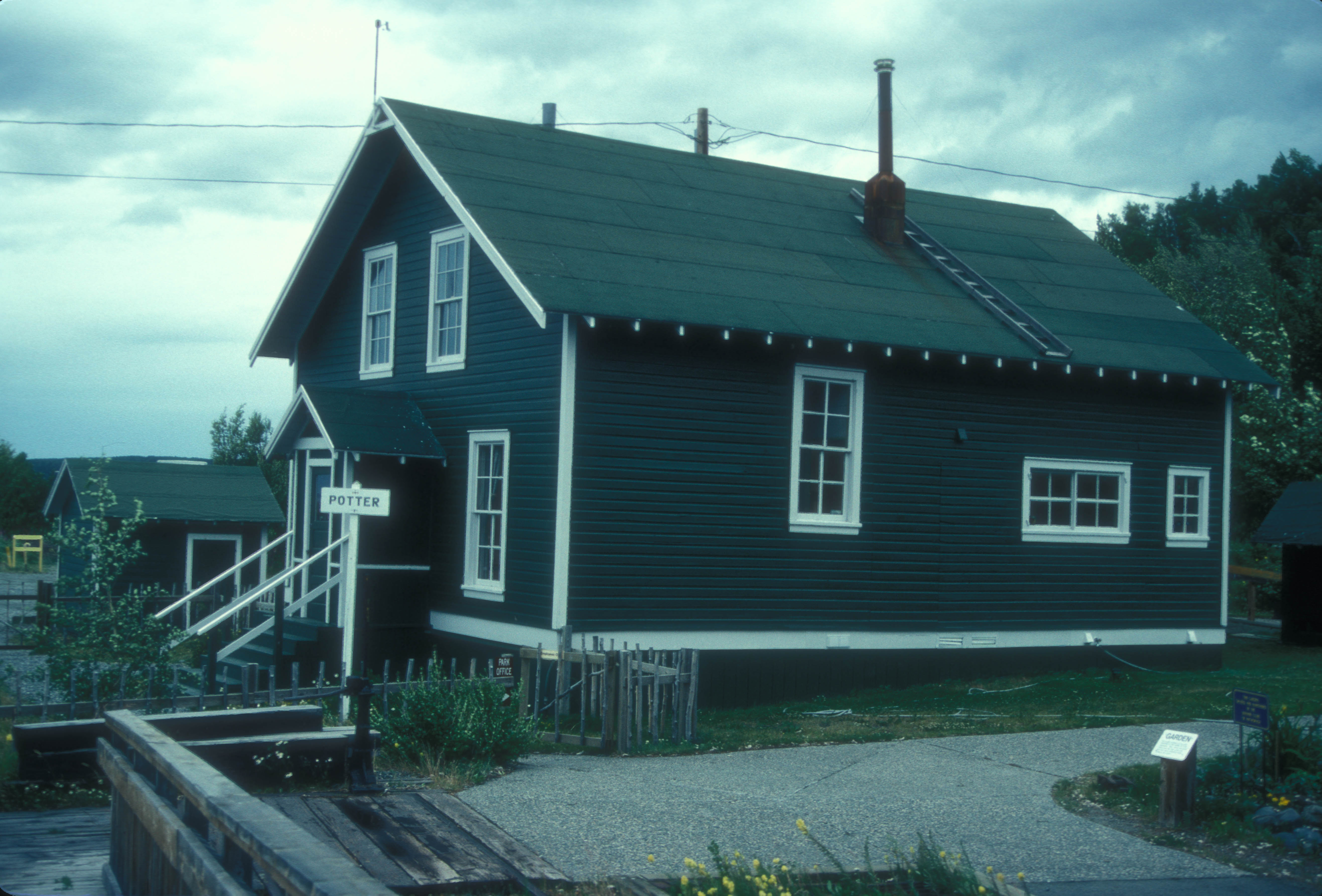
Potter Section House in Alaska.

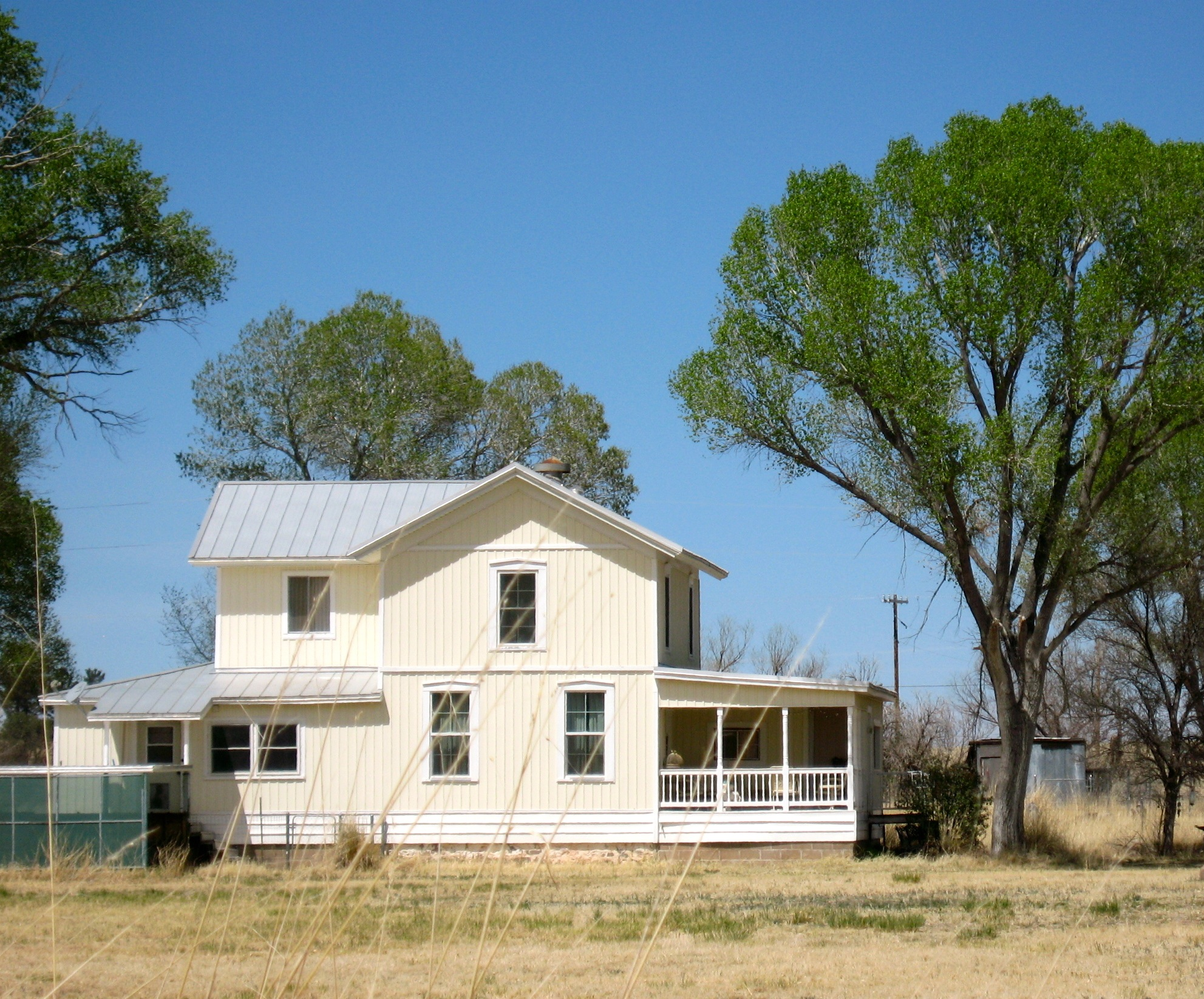
Section house for the New Mexico & Arizona Railroad, Elgin, Arizona. The railroad line ran just to the right of the large porch, approximately where the large cottonwood tree now stands.

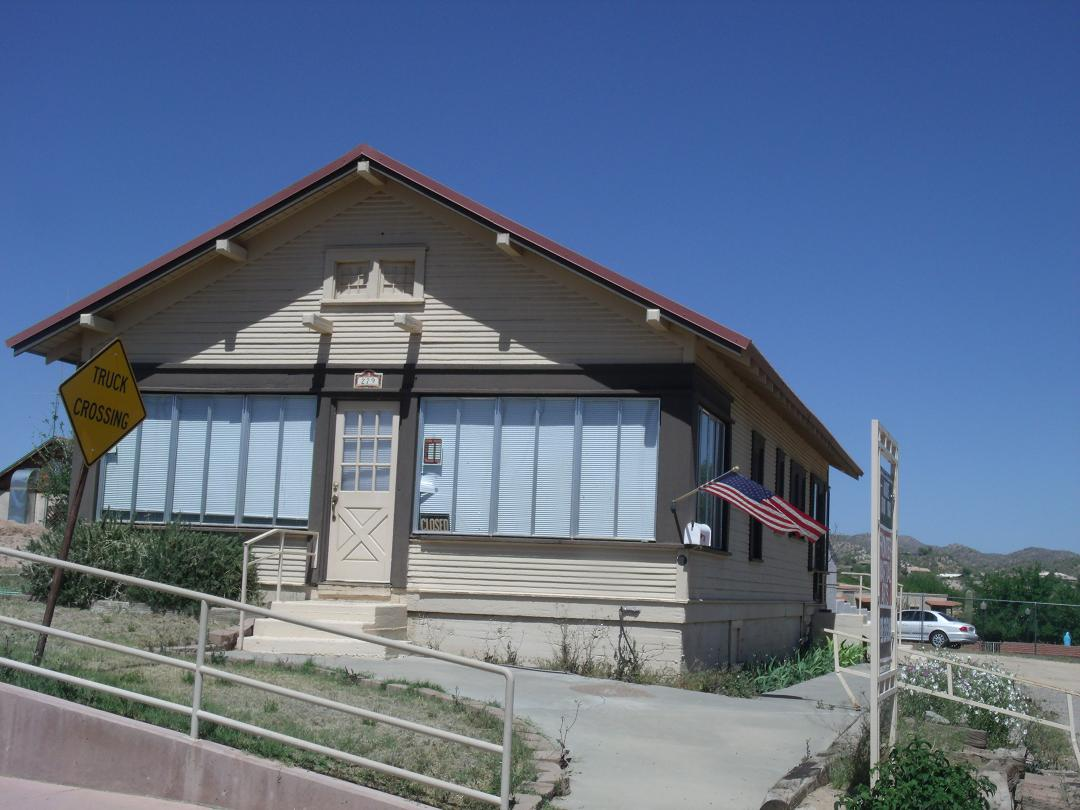
Atchison, Topeka and Santa Fe Railway section house in Wickenburg, Arizona.

Southern Pacific section foreman's house in Benson, Arizona.

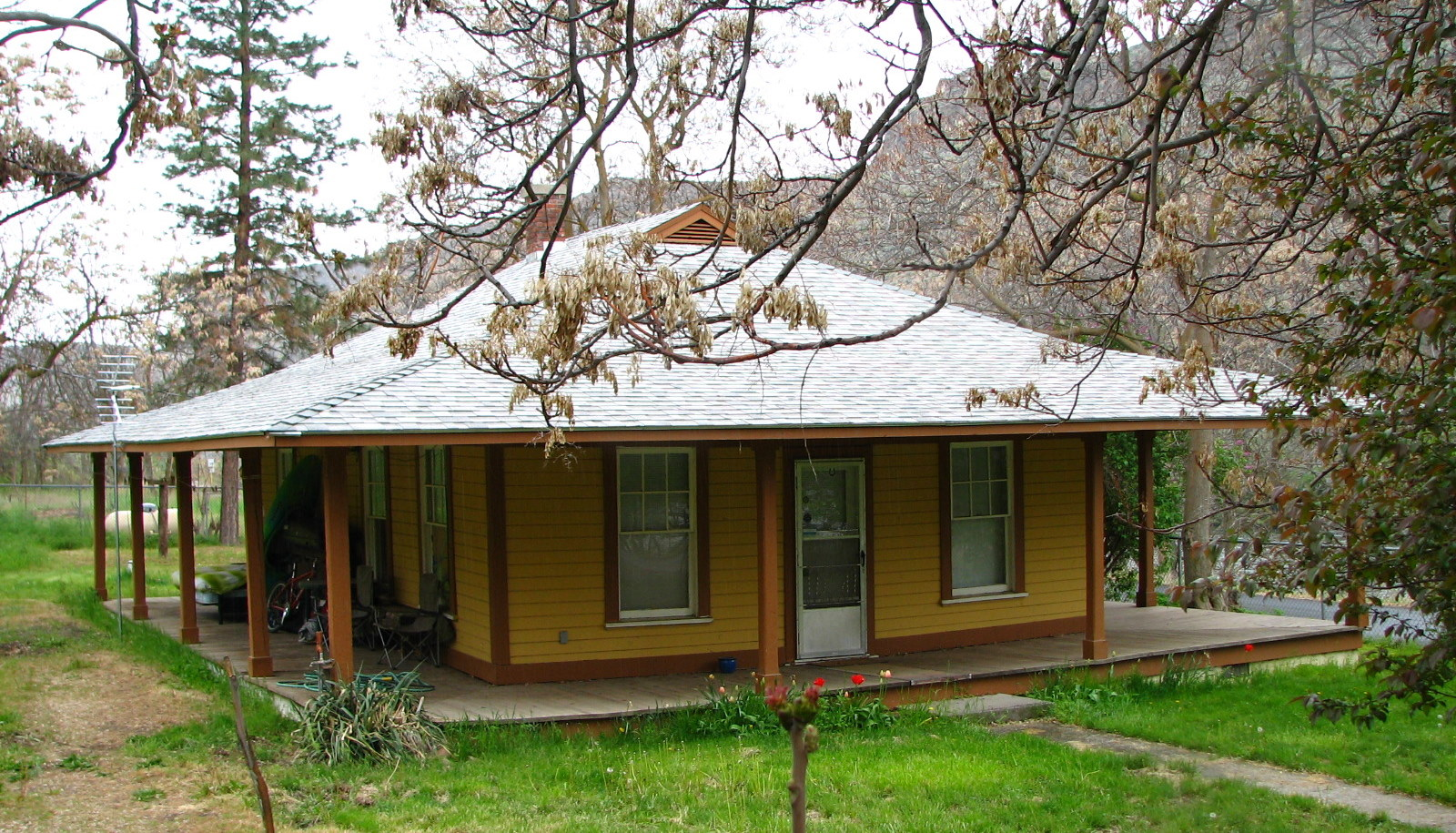
Maupin Section Foreman's House in Maupin, Oregon.

== See also ==
- Train station
- Section (rail transport)
