= Balch Hotel =

- U.S. National Register of Historic Places
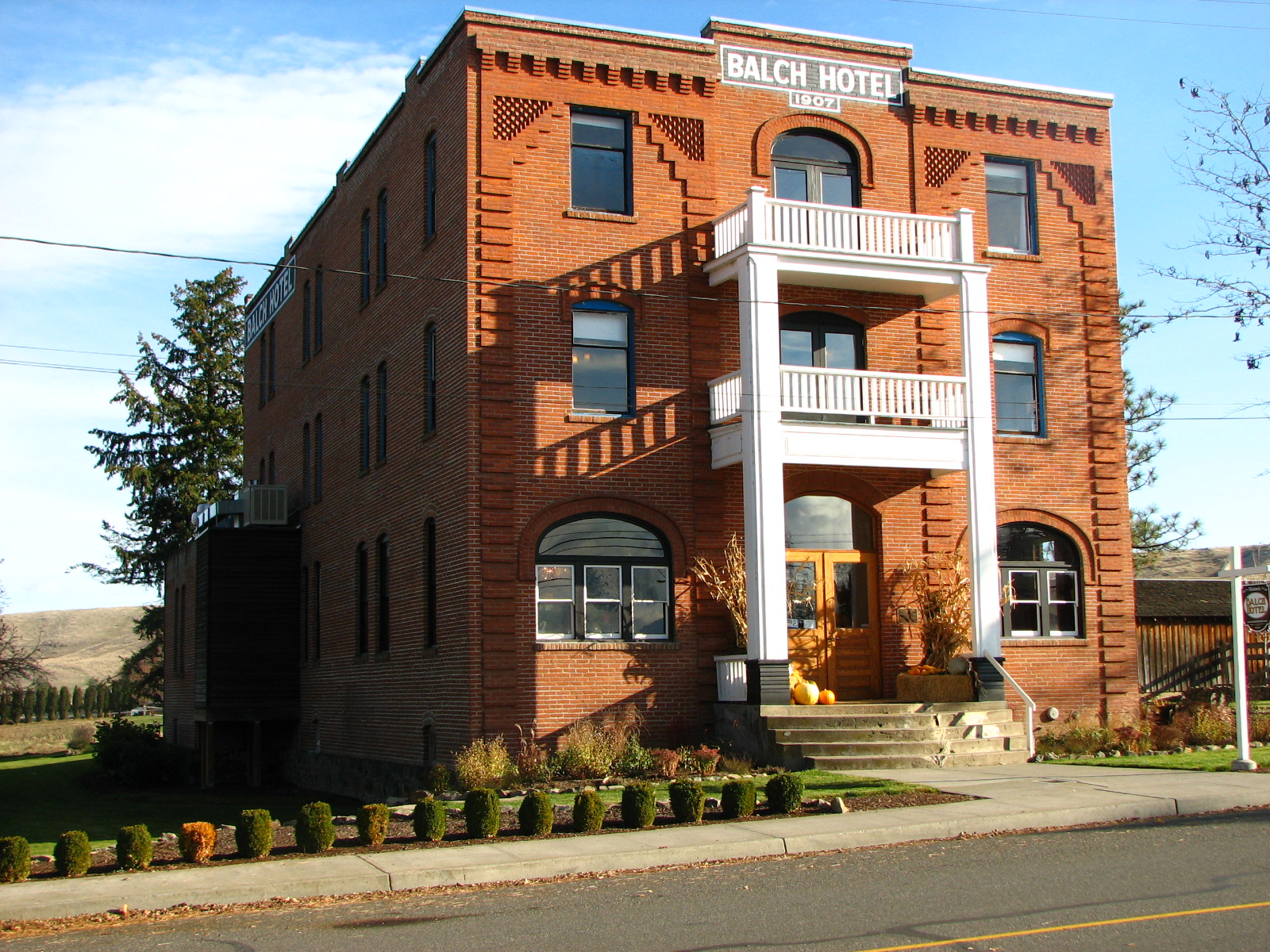
- The building's exterior in 2008
- Location: Dufur, Oregon, U.S.
- Coordinates: 45°27′02″N 121°07′53″W
- Built: 1907
- Architect: F. M. Andrews
- Architectural style: Italianate
- NRHP reference No.: 87001469
- Added to NRHP: 1987

The Balch Hotel is a historic commercial lodging building in Dufur, Oregon, United States. It was built in 1907 by Charles Balch, a local land owner and businessman. The hotel has changed hands a number of times over the years, but it has remained in continuous use since it was constructed. Today, the Balch Hotel is an active hotel serving visitors to the Dufur area. Because of its importance to local history, the Balch Hotel is listed on the National Register of Historic Places.

== History ==
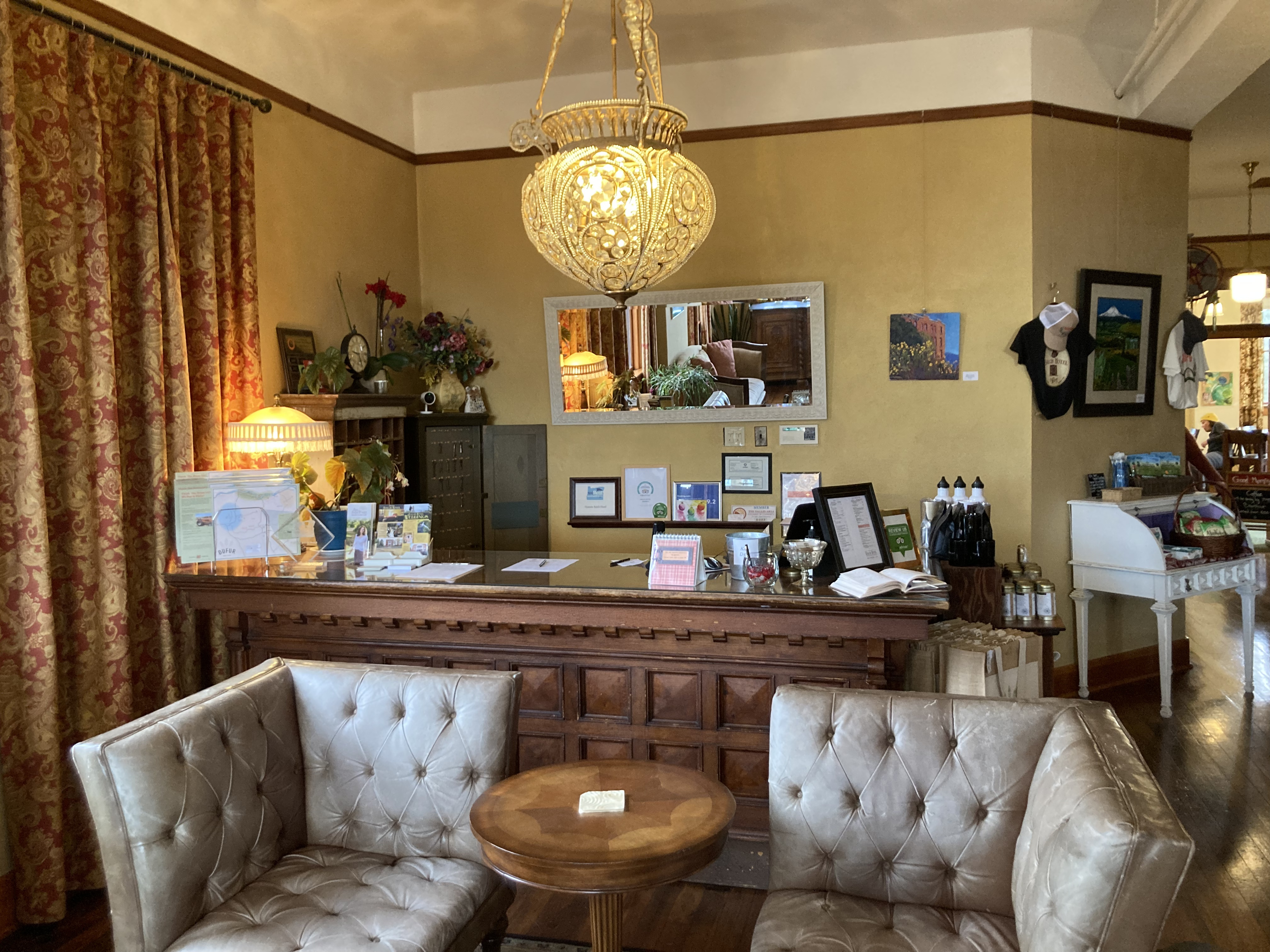
Reception desk

The first homesteader arrived in the Dufur area in 1852. The earliest community records are of church meetings beginning in 1862. The town was named for the Dufur family, successful ranchers who settled in the Dufur Valley in 1872. The Dufur post office was established in 1878. The town of Dufur was incorporated 1893.

The need to accommodate travelers grew along with the town of Dufur. The Balch Hotel was designed by F. M. Andrews for Charles P. Balch, a local rancher and pharmacist. It was built in 1907, and opened on 17 January 1908. When the hotel opened, the cost of a room ranged from $0.50 to $1.25 per night. The hotel boasted that it had hot water in every room, electric lights, and steam heat. At that time, there were only two places in the Dufur Valley that had electricity, the Balch Hotel and Dufur's saw mill. The two businesses shared the limited power supply; each got twelve hours of electricity per day. The lumber mill had electricity for 12 hours during the day, and the hotel was connected for twelve hours beginning in the evening. In its early years, the Great Southern Railroad would drop off salesmen, who could connect at Dufur between the railroad's northern terminus at The Dalles and coaches to points south in Central Oregon. The salesmen typically stayed at the Balch Hotel, and would set up their wares in the hotel's parlor. This made the hotel a center of community activity as well as a haven for travelers.

In 1914, Balch sold the hotel to Frank and Ethel Ingels. The onset of the Great Depression, which was attended by the closure of the railroad and the failure of a major local apple orchard, marked the end of Dufur's and the hotel's heyday. The Ingels family operated the hotel until the 1940s. When they sold the building, it was converted into apartments. It was a rooming house for a number of years and later a private residence. The building was eventually purchased by Howard and Patricia Green in 1988. The Greens restored and modernized the building and reopened the hotel. In 2006, Jeff and Samantha Irwin purchased the hotel from the Greens. The Irwins continued the Greens' restoration work. Then in June 2015, Claire Sierra and Josiah Dean took over operations. Today, the Balch Hotel is a small but well-appointed tourist hotel.

Because the Balch Hotel played an important role in the commercial development of Dufur and central Wasco County, the hotel was listed on the National Register of Historic Places on 8 September 1987. The historic site covers ten acres, with one historic building (the hotel) and three other non-contributing structures on the property.

== Structure ==
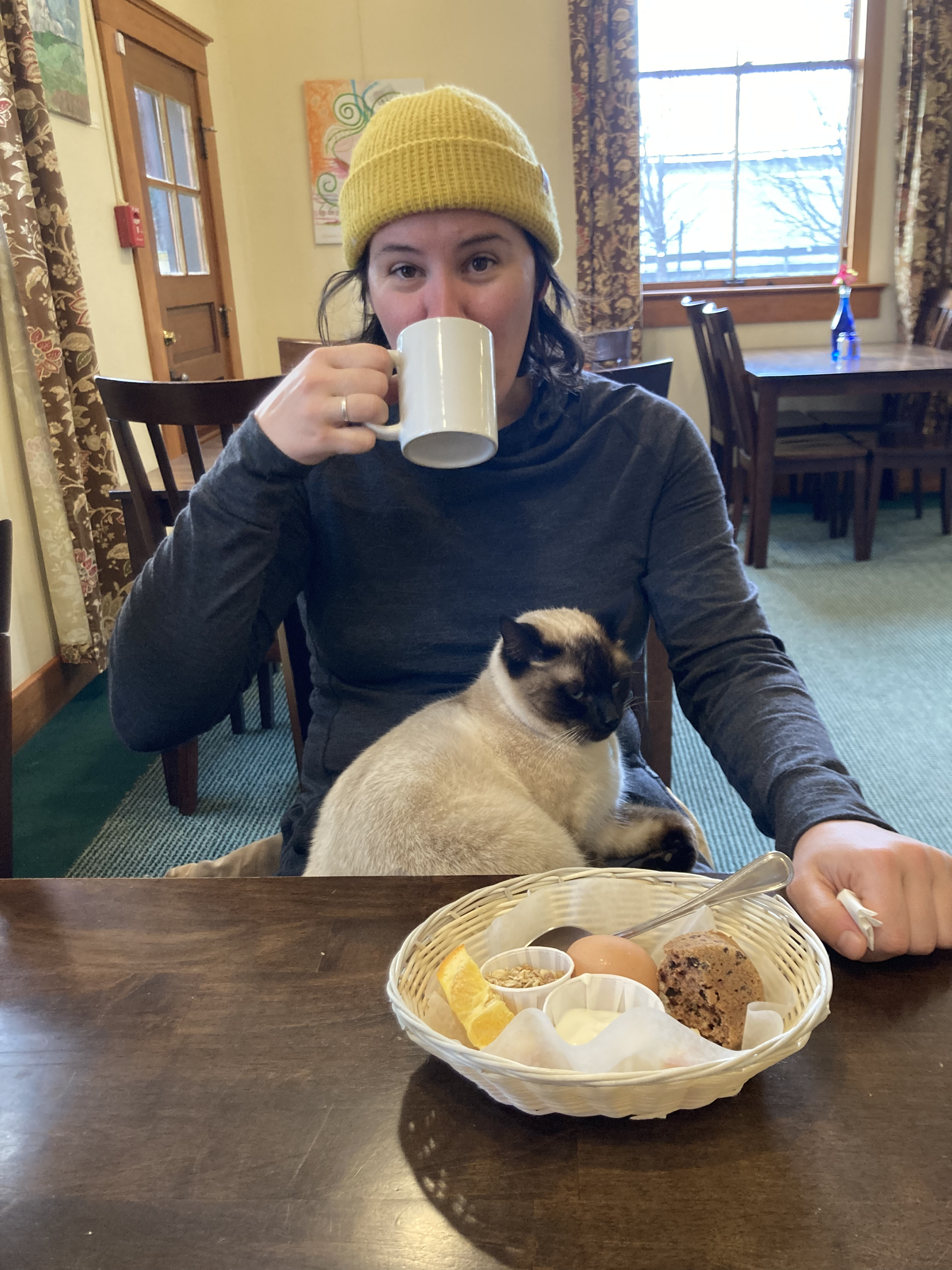
A guest eats breakfast with the hotel cat

The Balch Hotel is a three-story Italianate style brick building. The bricks used in the hotel's construction were made at a brickworks on Charles Balch's ranch, near the building site. The hotel's brick walls are 18 inches thick. This keeps the hotel's interior cool during the hot summer months.

All the rooms were restored and modernized between 1988 and 2007, so the Balch Hotel is quite modern; however, it still retains an early 20th-century feel. There are no telephones or televisions in the rooms, but there are wireless Internet connections. The building's historic character has been maintained in many small details; for example, original fire hoses hang in the hallway and an old electric meter is still in its original location on the second floor.

The hotel has 19 guest bedrooms plus a suite on the third floor with a view of Mount Hood and private whirlpool tub. Each room has an individual style with antique furnishings and unique period décor. All the rooms on the south side of the building have private baths. The rooms on the north side share common bath facilities with original claw-foot tubs.

== See also ==
- National Register of Historic Places listings in Wasco County, Oregon
