= Long Hollow Fire =

2018 wildfire in Oregon, United States

- Part of the 2018 Oregon wildfires
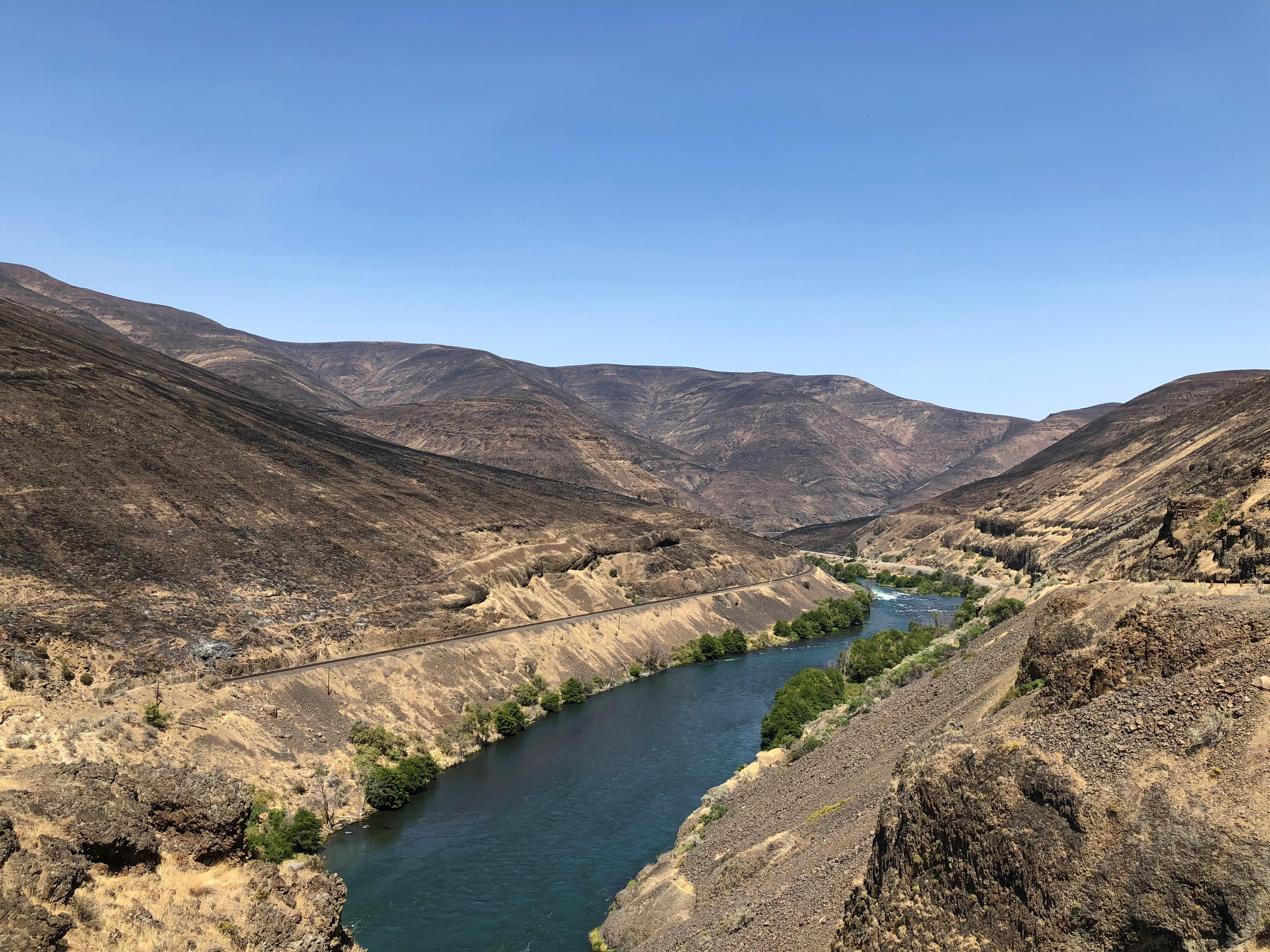
- Scorched land in the Deschutes River Canyon from the Long Hollow Fire
- Date: July 26, 2018 – August 14, 2018
- Location: Dufur, Oregon, United States
- Coordinates: 45.396°N 121.033°W

Statistics
- Burned area: 78,425 acres (317 km^{2})
- Land use: Agriculture

Ignition
- Cause: Human

Map
- Location of fire in Oregon

Location of Long Hollow Fire

The Long Hollow Fire was a wildfire burning five miles south of Dufur, Oregon in the United States. The fire was first reported on July 26, 2018, and has burned 78,425 acres (317 km^{2}) .The fire was started by farm equipment. The fire is located just south of the Substation Fire. It is the third major fire of the 2018 Oregon wildfire season.

== Events ==
=== July ===
The Long Hollow Fire was first reported on July 26, 2018, at 4:45 pm in a field southeast of Dufur, Oregon. The fire was started by farm equipment. Dry temperatures and strong winds led to the fire's rapid growth by evening into the canyon of the Deschutes River. A portion of the river and Highway 216 were closed as a result. On July 28, crews focused on targeting the fire in Jones Canyon. By July 29, the fire had burned over 30,000 acres (121 km^{2}). Despite the growth, containment lines were improved and by morning containment was 27 percent. Highway 216 and river access were made available again.

The next morning, July 30, the fire was over half contained, with the fire showing little growth despite warm temperatures. As of July 31, the Long Hollow Fire had burned 33,451 acres (135 km^{2}) and was 95 percent contained.

== Impact ==
The fire has impacted recreational activities along the Deschutes River. A segment of the river was closed for three days due to the fire's location in the river's canyon.
