= Andrew Dufur =

- Born: August 29, 1847; Williamstown, Vermont, U.S.
- Died: June 19, 1914 (aged 66); Dufur, Oregon, U.S.
- Resting place: Wilhelm's Portland Memorial Funeral Home, Portland, Oregon, U.S.

Andrew Jackson Dufur, Jr. (August 29, 1847 – June 19, 1914) was an American businessman and stockraiser who founded the city of Dufur, Oregon, which took his namesake.

== Biography ==
Dufur was born in Williamstown, Vermont, on August 29, 1847. His father was a native of New Hampshire, as were his parents. His father served through the entire War of 1812 and drew a pension for a partial disability. Andrew Jr.'s great grandfather was a French Huguenot, a refugee from France at the time of the historic French Revolution. They were of the aristocratic element whose lives were forfeited through the edict of the leaders of the Sans-culottes, Marat and Robspierre. Andrew J. Dufur, Sr., crossed the plains to California in 1859. His wife, Lois (Burnham) Dufur, was a native of Williamstown, Vermont, descendant of an old and distinguished New England family. She died at Dufur in 1895. She and her son went to Portland, Oregon, via Panama, arriving in April, 1860. They had been preceded by the father, Andrew J., Sr. For 12 years the family lived 6 miles (10 km) from Portland, on a farm owned jointly by father and sons, comprising 800 acres (320 ha). This property they disposed of in 1871. The father of our subject died at Dufur, in June, 1897.

Dufur was educated in district schools, supplemented by a term at Pacific University in Forest Grove, Oregon. In 1872 Dufur and his brother, Enoch B. Dufur, came to the vicinity of where is now the town of Dufur, and jointly purchased between 500 and 600 acres (200 and 240 ha). They were pioneers; only one settler was there before them, Joseph Beasley. The brothers platted the townsite in 1880. Dufur and his wife owned about 2,300 acres (930 ha) of land as of 1905. With his son-in-law, Charles P. Balch, he was engaged profitably in stock-raising. Mr. Dufur had two brothers, Enoch B. Dufur, a practicing attorney at Portland, Oregon. William H.H. Dufur, a farmer near Dufur, and one sister, Arabelle, wife of Thomas W.S. Slusher, a farmer living 3 miles (4.8 km) from Dufur.

On May 2, 1869, in Portland, Dufur married Mary M. Stansbery, of Indiana, daughter of John E. and Ann M. (Hughes) Stansbery. The father came to Oregon in 1862, settling on Columbia Slough, where he lived until the time of his death, in 1889. The mother lived in East Portland. Mrs. Dufur had three brothers and five sisters; John E. and Stephen E., at Woodlawn, Oregon; William G., on the Yukon River, in Alaska; Elizabeth, married to Milton M. Sunderland, a Portland capitalist; Susan, wife of James Wendell, of Portland; Lucetta, widow of John Foster, late of Hood River, Oregon; Rosabelle, married to Daniel Zeller, a builder and contractor at Dawson, Alaska; and Frances, wife of Morgan A. Zeller, of Portland.

Mr. and Mrs. Dufur had two children, Lois, wife of Charles P. Balch, and Anna, married to H.A. May, a merchant at Portland. He was a Democrat and frequently served his party at county and state conventions.
