= Klondike Fire =

2018 wildfire in the U.S. state of Oregon

- Part of the 2018 Oregon wildfires
- Date: July 15, 2018 – November 6, 2018
- Location: Siskiyou National Forest, Oregon, United States
- Coordinates: 42.369°N 123.86°W

Statistics
- Burned area: 175,258 acres (70,924 ha)

Impacts
- Structures destroyed: 0
- Cost: Unknown

Ignition
- Cause: Lightning

Map
- Location of fire in Oregon.

Location of Klondike Fire

The Klondike Fire was a wildfire in the U.S. state of Oregon. The fire had burned more than 175,258 acres (709 km^{2}). During the fire, a part of the fire was merged into the Taylor Creek Fire, that specific fire, had burned 52,839 acres (214 km^{2}).

== Events ==
The Klondike fire was started by a lightning strike on July 15, 2018 in the Kalmiopsis Wilderness area 9 miles west of Selma, Oregon. High winds and inaccessible terrain allowed for rapid growth. By August 14 the Klondike and Taylor Creek fires merged and jumped the Illinois River. Fire growth was slowed by the burn scars of the 2017 Chetco Bar Fire. On August 29, the fire passed 100,000 acres and was 40% contained.

== Fire growth and containment progress ==
Fire containment status Gray: contained; Red: active; %: percent contained;
Date	Area burned acres (km^{2})	Containment
Aug 7	28,746 (116)	
Aug 8	35,072 (142)	
Aug 9	36,876 (149)	
Aug 10	38,382 (155)	
Aug 11	47,030 (190)	
Aug 12	51,120 (207)	
Aug 13	55,248 (224)	
Aug 14	55,248 (224)	
Aug 15	57,325 (232)	
Aug 16	59,015 (239)	
Aug 17	62,731 (254)	
Aug 18	66,332 (268)	
Aug 19	68,241 (276)	
Aug 20	72,074 (292)	
Aug 21	76,098 (308)	
Aug 22	76,098 (308)	
Aug 23	79,501 (322)	
Sep 9	130,258 (527)	
Oct 31	175,258 (709)	
Nov 1	175,258 (709)	
Nov 2	175,258 (709)	
Nov 3	175,258 (709)	
