= South Wasco County High School =

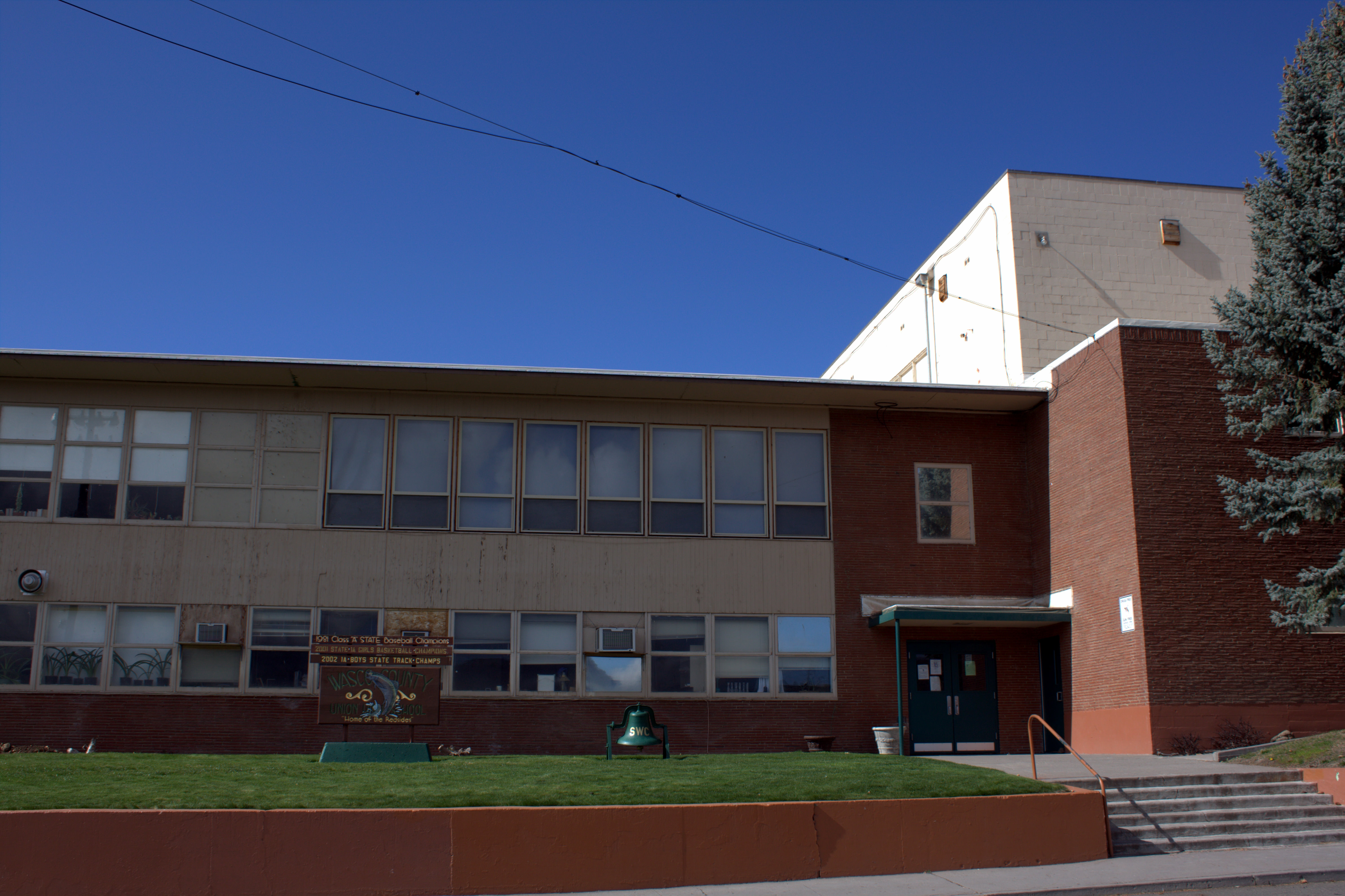

Location
- 699 4th Street; Maupin, (Wasco County), Oregon 97037; United States
- Coordinates: 45.176475°N 121.078949°W

Information
- Type: Public
- School district: South Wasco County School District
- Principal: Ryan Wraught
- Grades: 7-12
- Enrollment: 118 (2016-17)
- Colors: Green and gold
- Athletics conference: OSAA Big Sky League 1A-6
- Mascot: Redside
- Rival: Sherman Junior/Senior High School (Moro, Oregon)
- Website: www.swasco.net

South Wasco County High School is a public high school in Maupin, Oregon, United States.

== Academics ==
In 2008, 93% of the school's seniors received a high school diploma. Of 27 students, 25 graduated, none dropped out, and two were still in high school the following year.
