= Graham Fire =

2018 wildfire in Oregon, United States

- Part of the 2018 Oregon wildfires
- Date: June 21, 2018 – July 4, 2018
- Location: Culver, Oregon, United States
- Coordinates: 44.539°N 121.426°W

Statistics
- Burned area: 2,175 acres (9 km^{2})
- Land use: Private

Impacts
- Structures lost: 7

Ignition
- Cause: Lightning

Map
- Location of fire in Oregon.

The Graham Fire was a wildfire four miles south of the Metolius River near Culver, Oregon. The fire was caused by a lightning strike and was first reported on June 21, 2018. The fire is one of 70 started over a two-day period of dry conditions and heavy winds in Central Oregon. The fire was contained on July 4 at a size of 2,175 acres (9 square kilometers).

== Events ==
The Graham Fire was reported on the afternoon of June 21, 2018 south of the Metolius River near Culver, Oregon. The fire was started by a lightning strike and was fueled by brush, timber and grass, primarily burning private lands. By Saturday, June 23, the fire had reached 2,143 acres (9 km^{2}), with fire crews focusing on burnout efforts to contain the fire. Two homes and five out buildings were destroyed.

The Graham Fire was contained on June 27 and burned a total of 2,175 acres (9 km^{2}).

== Impact ==
The Graham Fire burned private lands protected by the Oregon Department of Forestry and Lake Chinook Fire and Rescue, as well as public lands owned by the Bureau of Land Management. In total, two homes and five outbuildings were destroyed.

=== Evacuations ===
The subdivision of Three Rivers was evacuated on June 21 due to extreme fire conditions threatening homes.
