= Sherman Junior/Senior High School (Moro, Oregon) =

Sherman High School

Location
- 65912 High School Loop; Moro, (Sherman County), Oregon 97039; United States; 45.473686°N 120.741527°W

Information
- Type: Public
- School district: Sherman County School District
- Principal: Mike Somnis
- Grades: 7-12
- Enrollment: 288 K-12 (2024–2025)
- Colors: Orange and black
- Athletics conference: OSAA Big Sky League 1A-6
- Mascot: Husky
- Rival: Dufur School South Wasco County High School
- Newspaper: Husky Times
- Website: www.sherman.k12.or.us

Sherman High School is a public high school in Moro, Oregon, United States.

== Academics ==
In 2008, 92% of the school's seniors received a high school diploma. Of 26 students, 24 graduated, one dropped out, and one received a modified diploma.
