= Charles E. Nelson House =

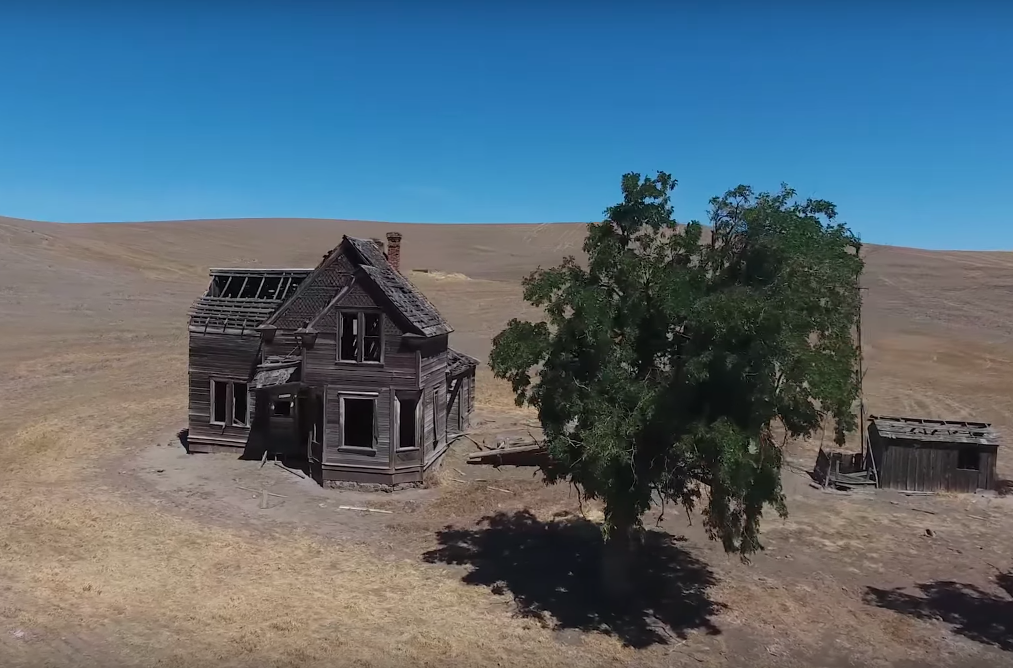
- The Nelson House in 2017
- Interactive map of the Charles E. Nelson House area
- Etymology: Charles E. Nelson

General information
- Type: House
- Architectural style: Queen Anne
- Location: Dufur, Oregon, United States
- Coordinates: 45.5418364°N 121.024195°W
- Completed: Late-19th century
- Demolished: 2018

Design and construction
- Known for: One of the most widely photographed houses in Oregon

The Charles E. Nelson House was an historic house located in Dufur, Oregon, in the United States. The late-19th century Queen Anne Victorian was burned by the Substation Fire in mid-2018. It was one of the most widely photographed houses in Oregon.
