= Jack Knife Fire =

2018 wildfire in the U.S. state of Oregon

- Part of the 2018 Oregon wildfires
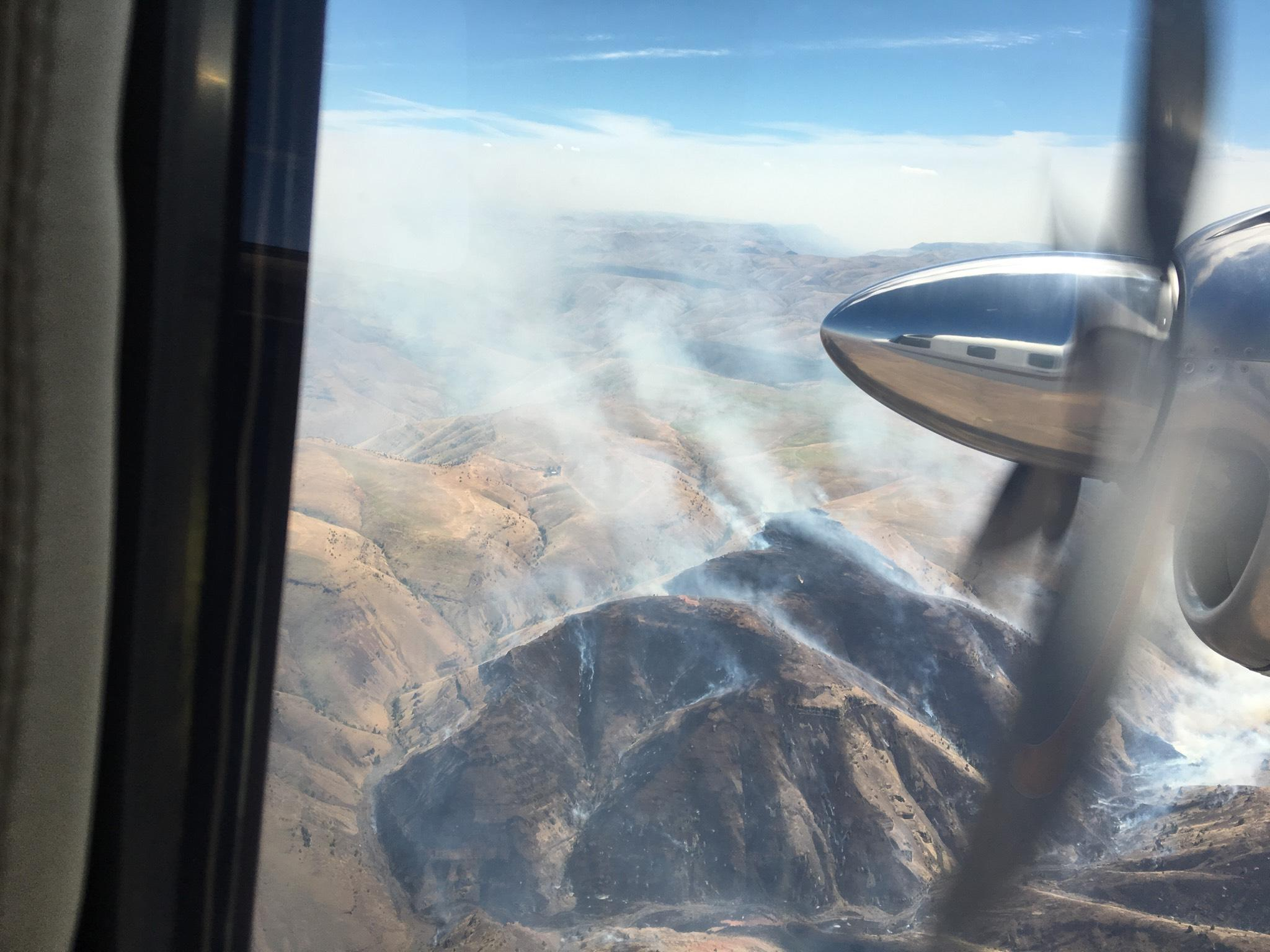
- Jack Knife Fire on June 22, 2018
- Date: June 20, 2018 – July 6, 2018
- Location: Kent, Oregon, United States
- Coordinates: 45.272°N 120.613°W

Statistics
- Burned area: 15,676 acres (63 km^{2})

Map
- Location of fire in Oregon.

The Jack Knife Fire was a wildfire five miles north of Kent, Oregon in the United States. The fire was started by lightning on June 20, 2018, around 3:00 pm, just west of the John Day River. The fire burned 15,676 acres (63 km^{2}).

== Events ==
The Jack Knife fire was started on June 20, 2018, by a lightning strike, along the John Day River, five miles north of Kent, Oregon. The fire was one of 70 wildfires started in Oregon due to lightning strikes over a two-day period. By June 23, the fire had spread to 2,000 acres (8 km^{2}), moving along the river and north to Wilson Point and south to Adobe Point.

By June 26, the fire had grown to 15,676 acres (63 km^{2}) as the result of hot and dry weather. It was contained on July 6.
