= Dufur, Oregon =

- City
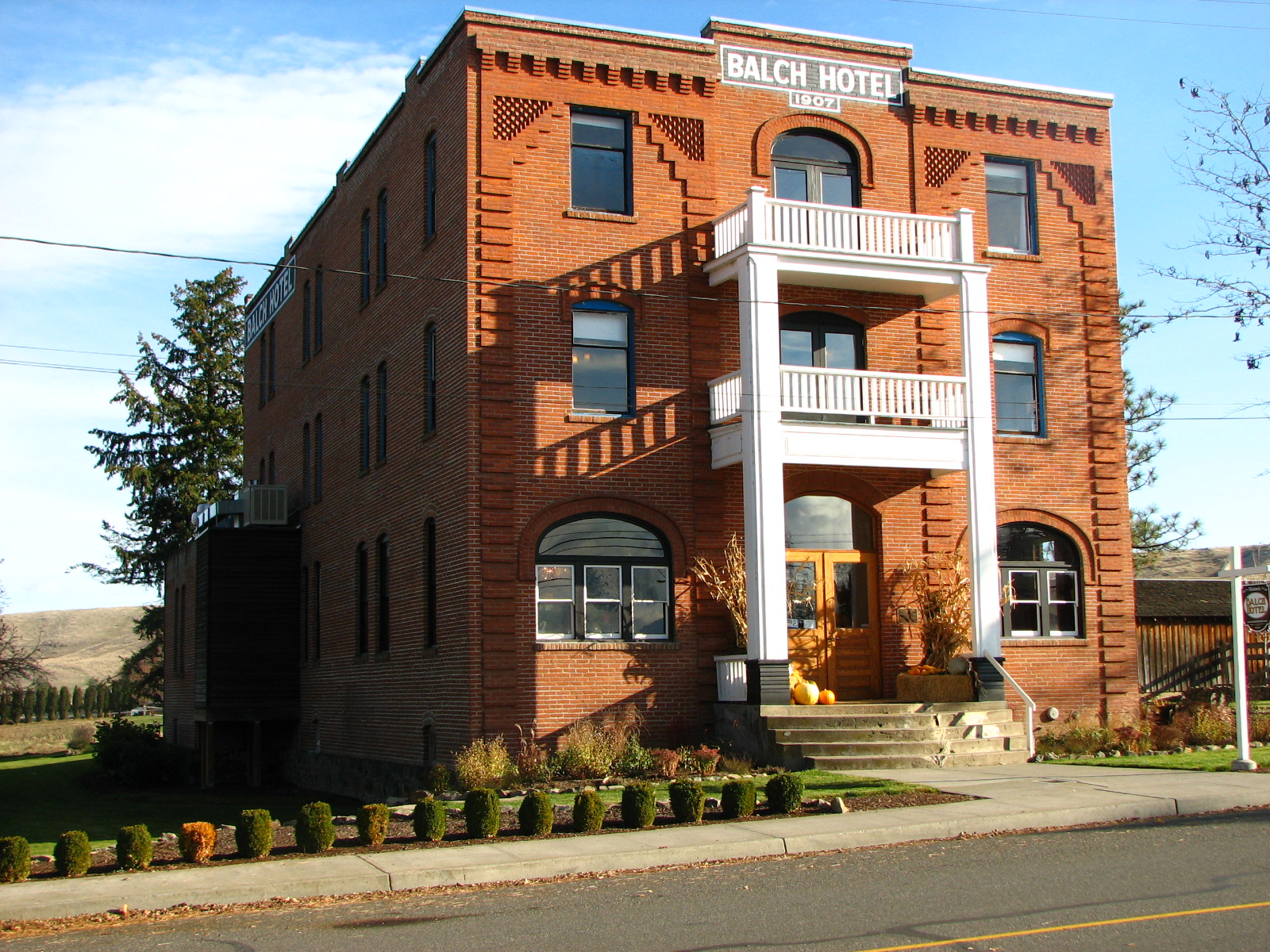
- The Balch Hotel in Dufur

- Location in Oregon
- Coordinates: 45°27′11″N 121°07′38″W
- Country: United States
- State: Oregon
- County: Wasco
- Incorporated: 1893

Government
  - Mayor: Merle Keys

Area
  - Total: 0.59 sq mi (1.53 km^{2})
  - Land: 0.59 sq mi (1.53 km^{2})
  - Water: 0 sq mi (0.00 km^{2})
- Elevation: 1,339 ft (408 m)

Population (2020)
  - Total: 632
  - Density: 1,073.0/sq mi (414.29/km^{2})
- Demonym: Dufurite
- Time zone: UTC-8 (Pacific)
  - Summer (DST): UTC-7 (Pacific)
- ZIP code: 97021
- Area codes: 458 and 541
- FIPS code: 41-20900
- GNIS feature ID: 2410366
- Website: cityofdufur.org

Dufur is a city in Wasco County, Oregon, United States. As of the 2020 census, Dufur had a population of 632. It is a farming community where wheat, tree fruit, and grapes are important crops.

== History ==
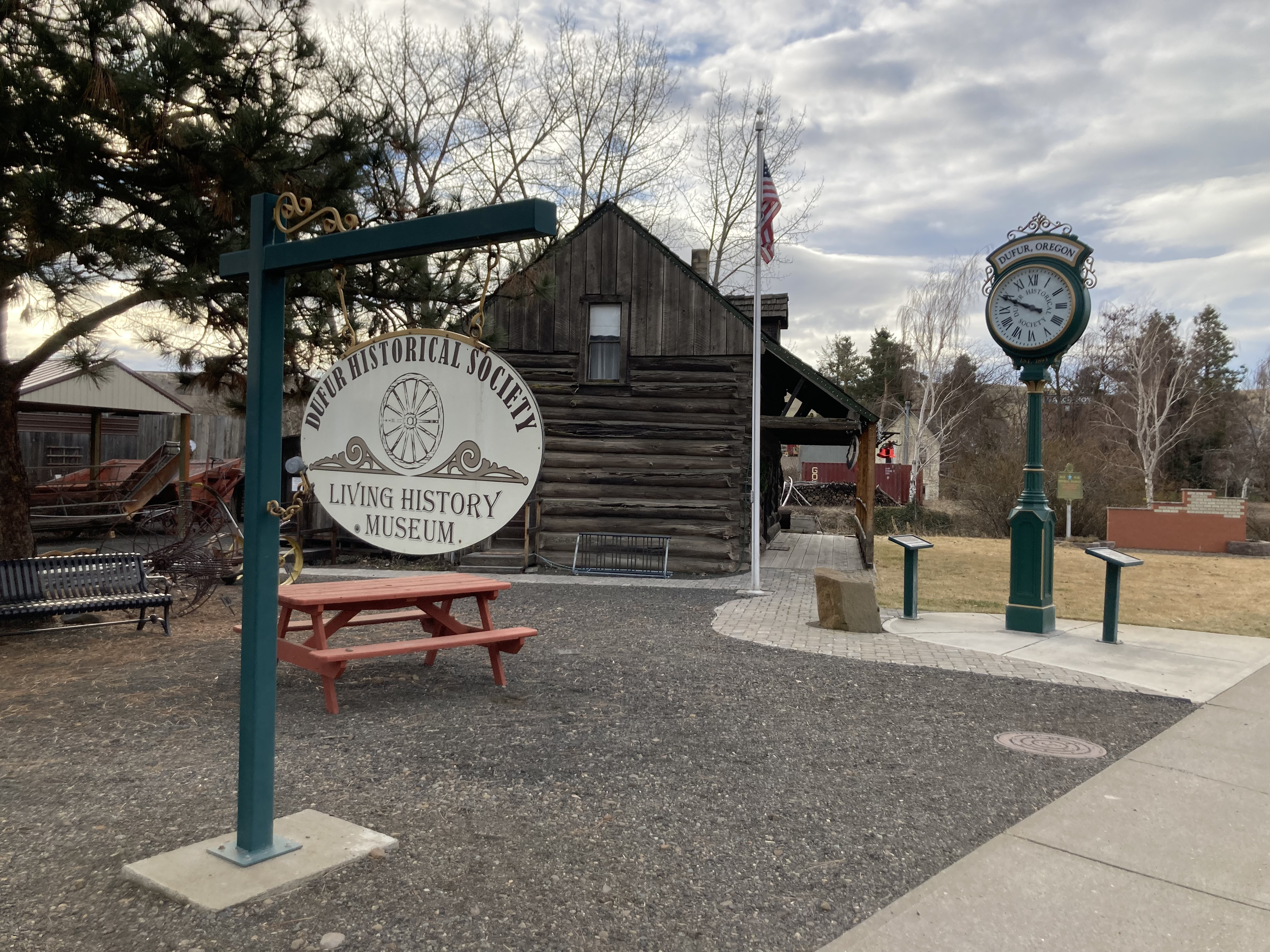
Dufur Historical Society's Living History Museum

Originally named Wasco, Dufur was incorporated on February 10, 1893, and named after Andrew Dufur and his brother Enoch Burnham Dufur. In 1859 they began raising stock on 600 acres (2.4 km^{2}) of land located where the city now stands.

In 2018, areas of Dufur were evacuated due to three wildfires, the Long Hollow Fire, the Substation Fire, and the South Valley Fire, which burned over 100,000 acres in total.

== Geography ==
According to the United States Census Bureau, the city has a total area of 0.58 square miles (1.50 km^{2}), all of it land.

The hillside letter D can be seen in the northwest. (45.458°N 121.1387°W)

== Climate ==
This region experiences warm (but not hot) and dry summers, with no average monthly temperatures above 68 °F. According to the Köppen Climate Classification system, Dufur has a warm-summer Mediterranean climate, abbreviated "Csb" on climate maps.

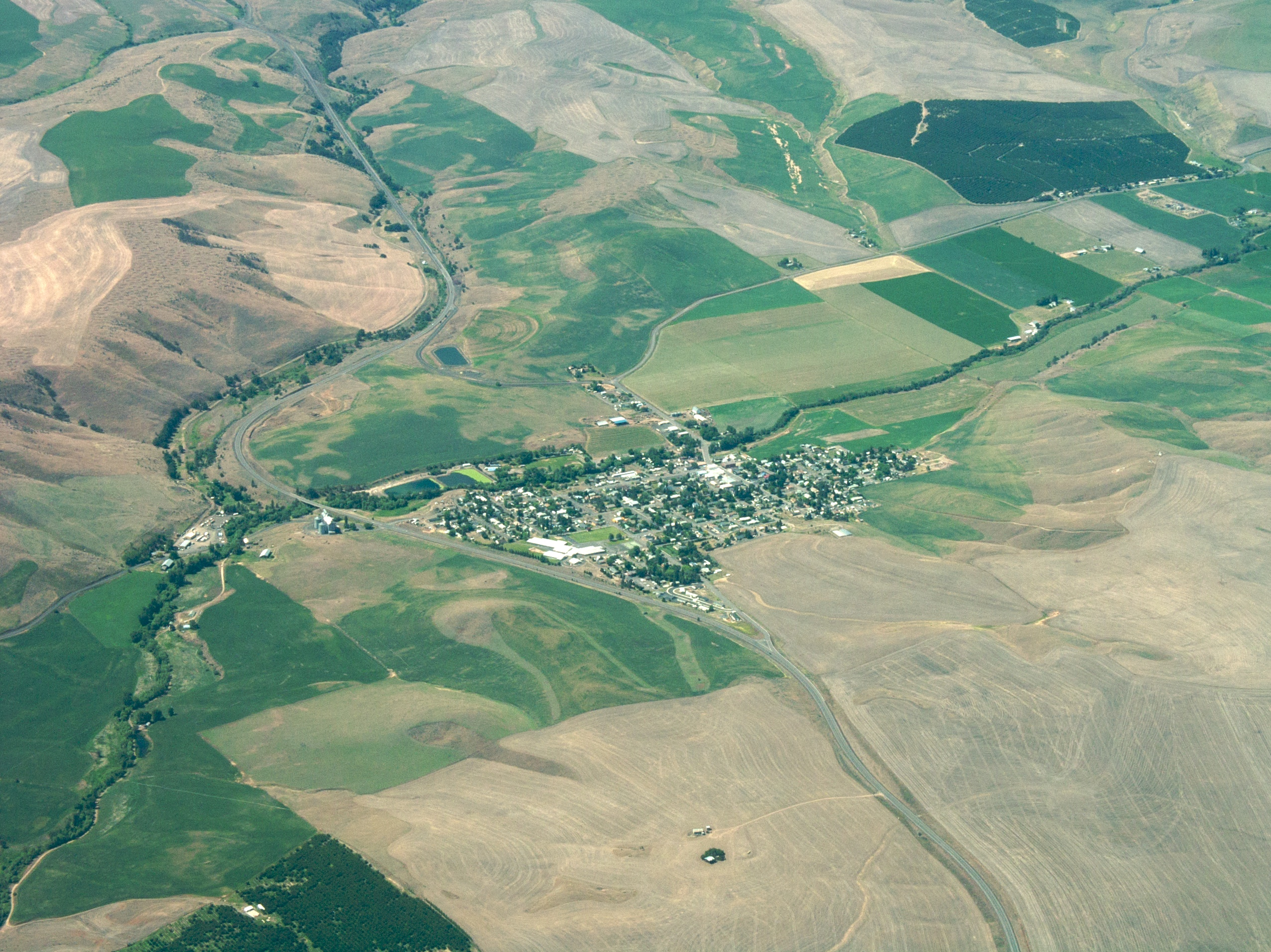
Aerial view of the city

Climate data for Dufur
Month	Jan	Feb	Mar	Apr	May	Jun	Jul	Aug	Sep	Oct	Nov	Dec	Year
Record high °F (°C)	70 (21)	73 (23)	80 (27)	90 (32)	103 (39)	106 (41)	110 (43)	109 (43)	103 (39)	92 (33)	75 (24)	67 (19)	110 (43)
Mean daily maximum °F (°C)	39.5 (4.2)	46 (8)	54.4 (12.4)	62.1 (16.7)	70.4 (21.3)	77.3 (25.2)	85.9 (29.9)	85 (29)	77 (25)	63.9 (17.7)	48.6 (9.2)	40.5 (4.7)	62.5 (16.9)
Mean daily minimum °F (°C)	23.8 (−4.6)	27.1 (−2.7)	30.9 (−0.6)	34.3 (1.3)	39.6 (4.2)	44.8 (7.1)	48.8 (9.3)	48.4 (9.1)	43.4 (6.3)	36.4 (2.4)	30.2 (−1.0)	25.8 (−3.4)	36.1 (2.3)
Record low °F (°C)	−26 (−32)	−28 (−33)	5 (−15)	16 (−9)	10 (−12)	23 (−5)	31 (−1)	32 (0)	17 (−8)	8 (−13)	−12 (−24)	−25 (−32)	−28 (−33)
Average precipitation inches (mm)	2.01 (51)	1.4 (36)	1.09 (28)	0.81 (21)	0.86 (22)	0.68 (17)	0.24 (6.1)	0.29 (7.4)	0.59 (15)	0.91 (23)	1.82 (46)	2.08 (53)	12.77 (324)
Average snowfall inches (cm)	9.7 (25)	4.9 (12)	1.5 (3.8)	0.1 (0.25)	0 (0)	0 (0)	0 (0)	0 (0)	0 (0)	0.2 (0.51)	2.8 (7.1)	7.6 (19)	26.7 (68)
Average precipitation days	12	10	9	7	6	5	2	2	4	7	11	12	87

== Demographics ==
Historical population
Census	Pop.	Note	%±
1900	336		—
1910	523		55.7%
1920	533		1.9%
1930	382		−28.3%
1940	392		2.6%
1950	422		7.7%
1960	488		15.6%
1970	493		1.0%
1980	560		13.6%
1990	527		−5.9%
2000	588		11.6%
2010	604		2.7%
2020	632		4.6%
U.S. Decennial Census

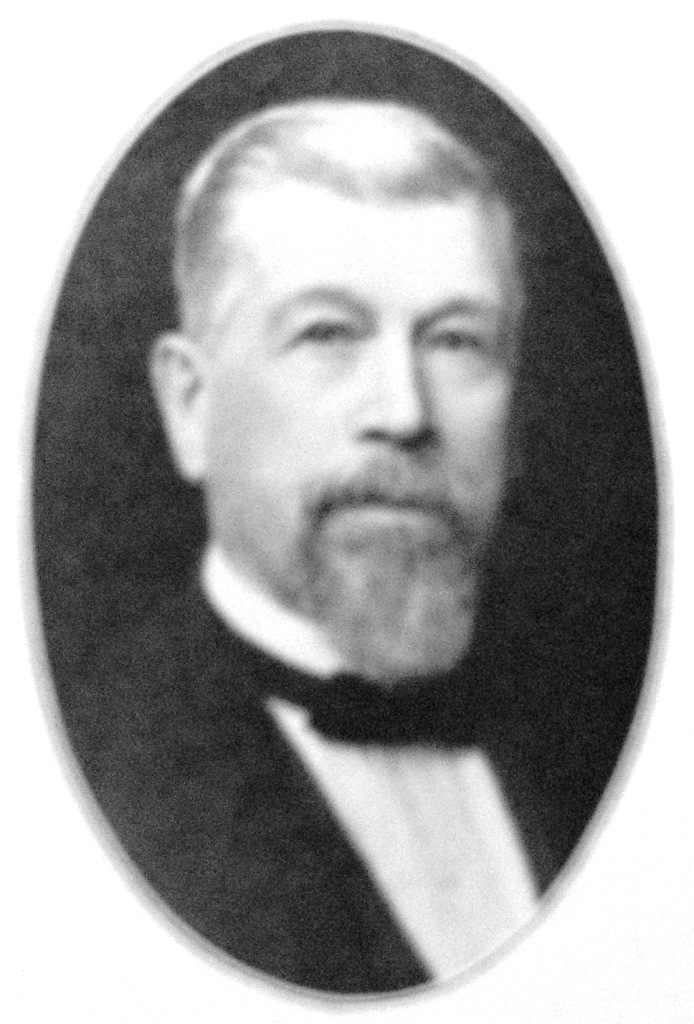
Namesake, Enoch Dufur

=== 2020 census ===
As of the 2020 census, Dufur had a population of 632. The median age was 41.8 years. 25.3% of residents were under the age of 18 and 23.3% of residents were 65 years of age or older. For every 100 females there were 101.9 males, and for every 100 females age 18 and over there were 93.4 males age 18 and over.

0% of residents lived in urban areas, while 100.0% lived in rural areas.

There were 249 households in Dufur, of which 36.9% had children under the age of 18 living in them. Of all households, 49.0% were married-couple households, 22.5% were households with a male householder and no spouse or partner present, and 22.1% were households with a female householder and no spouse or partner present. About 27.3% of all households were made up of individuals and 15.2% had someone living alone who was 65 years of age or older.

There were 276 housing units, of which 9.8% were vacant. Among occupied housing units, 76.3% were owner-occupied and 23.7% were renter-occupied. The homeowner vacancy rate was 1.0% and the rental vacancy rate was 1.6%.

Racial composition as of the 2020 census
Race	Number	Percent
White	582	92.1%
Black or African American	5	0.8%
American Indian and Alaska Native	2	0.3%
Asian	1	0.2%
Native Hawaiian and Other Pacific Islander	1	0.2%
Some other race	6	0.9%
Two or more races	35	5.5%
Hispanic or Latino (of any race)	20	3.2%

=== 2010 census ===
As of the census of 2010, there were 604 people, 244 households, and 163 families living in the city. The population density was 1,041.4 inhabitants per square mile (402.1/km^{2}). There were 263 housing units at an average density of 453.4 per square mile (175.1/km^{2}). The racial makeup of the city was 94.5% White, 1.7% Native American, 0.2% Asian, 0.2% Pacific Islander, 1.3% from other races, and 2.2% from two or more races. Hispanic or Latino of any race were 1.5% of the population.

There were 244 households, of which 33.2% had children under the age of 18 living with them, 55.7% were married couples living together, 7.8% had a female householder with no husband present, 3.3% had a male householder with no wife present, and 33.2% were non-families. 29.5% of all households were made up of individuals, and 14% had someone living alone who was 65 years of age or older. The average household size was 2.47 and the average family size was 3.04.

The median age in the city was 42.6 years. 26.2% of residents were under the age of 18; 5.9% were between the ages of 18 and 24; 20.2% were from 25 to 44; 27.1% were from 45 to 64; and 20.5% were 65 years of age or older. The gender makeup of the city was 50.2% male and 49.8% female.

=== 2000 census ===
As of the census of 2000, there were 588 people, 244 households, and 173 families living in the city. The population density was 1,007.5 inhabitants per square mile (389.0/km^{2}). There were 265 housing units at an average density of 454.1 per square mile (175.3/km^{2}). The racial makeup of the city was 97.45% White, 0.68% Native American, 0.34% from other races, and 1.53% from two or more races. Hispanic or Latino of any race were 1.36% of the population.

There were 244 households, out of which 32.0% had children under the age of 18 living with them, 57.8% were married couples living together, 8.2% had a female householder with no husband present, and 28.7% were non-families. 26.2% of all households were made up of individuals, and 11.9% had someone living alone who was 65 years of age or older. The average household size was 2.41 and the average family size was 2.89.

In the city, the population was spread out, with 26.5% under the age of 18, 4.4% from 18 to 24, 21.9% from 25 to 44, 28.4% from 45 to 64, and 18.7% who were 65 years of age or older. The median age was 43 years. For every 100 females, there were 103.5 males. For every 100 females age 18 and over, there were 102.8 males.

The median income for a household in the city was $37,500, and the median income for a family was $41,667. Males had a median income of $34,375 versus $19,792 for females. The per capita income for the city was $17,615. About 5.2% of families and 8.3% of the population were below the poverty line, including 10.4% of those under age 18 and 7.5% of those age 65 or over.

== Culture ==
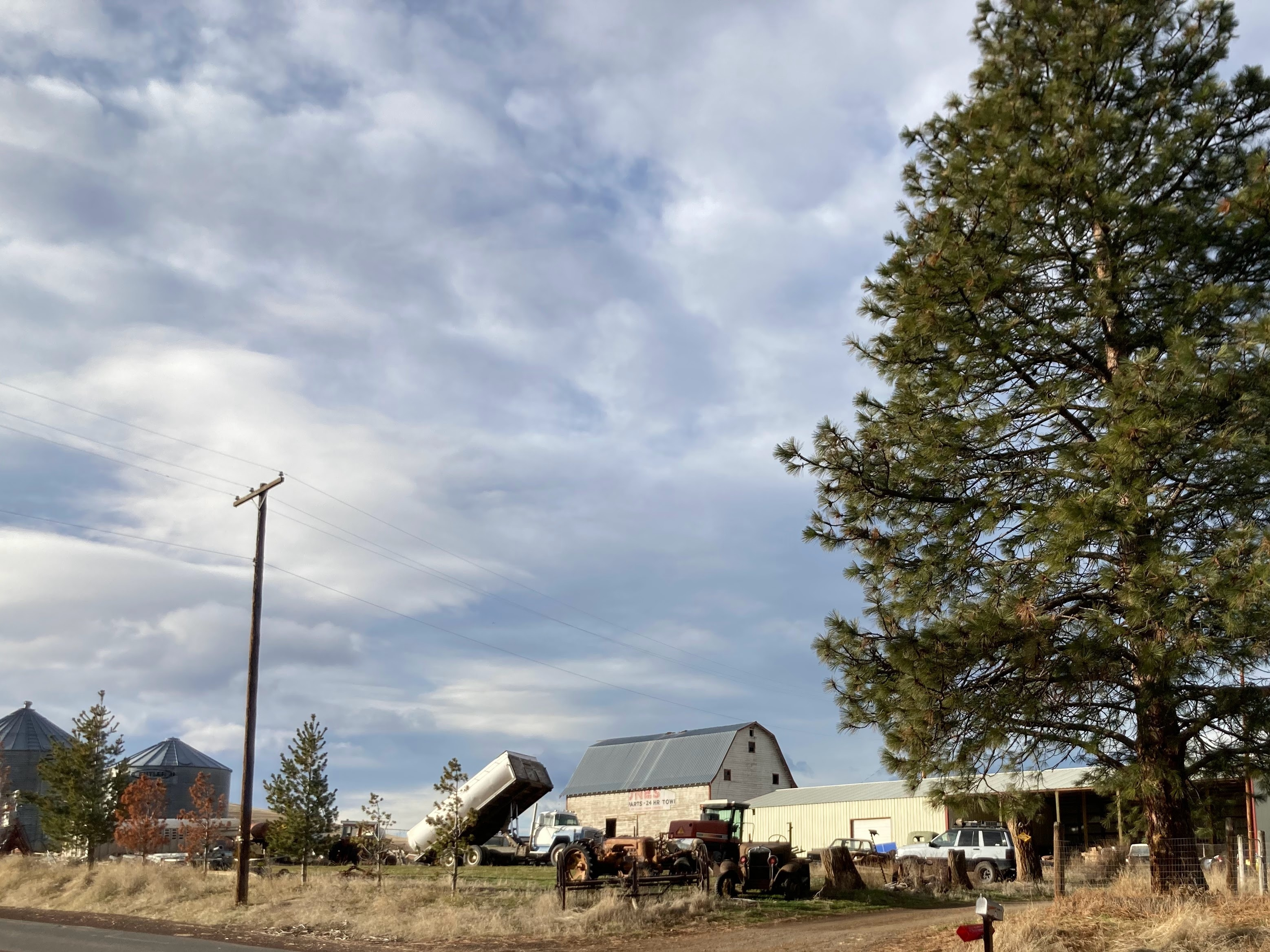
A farm in Dufur

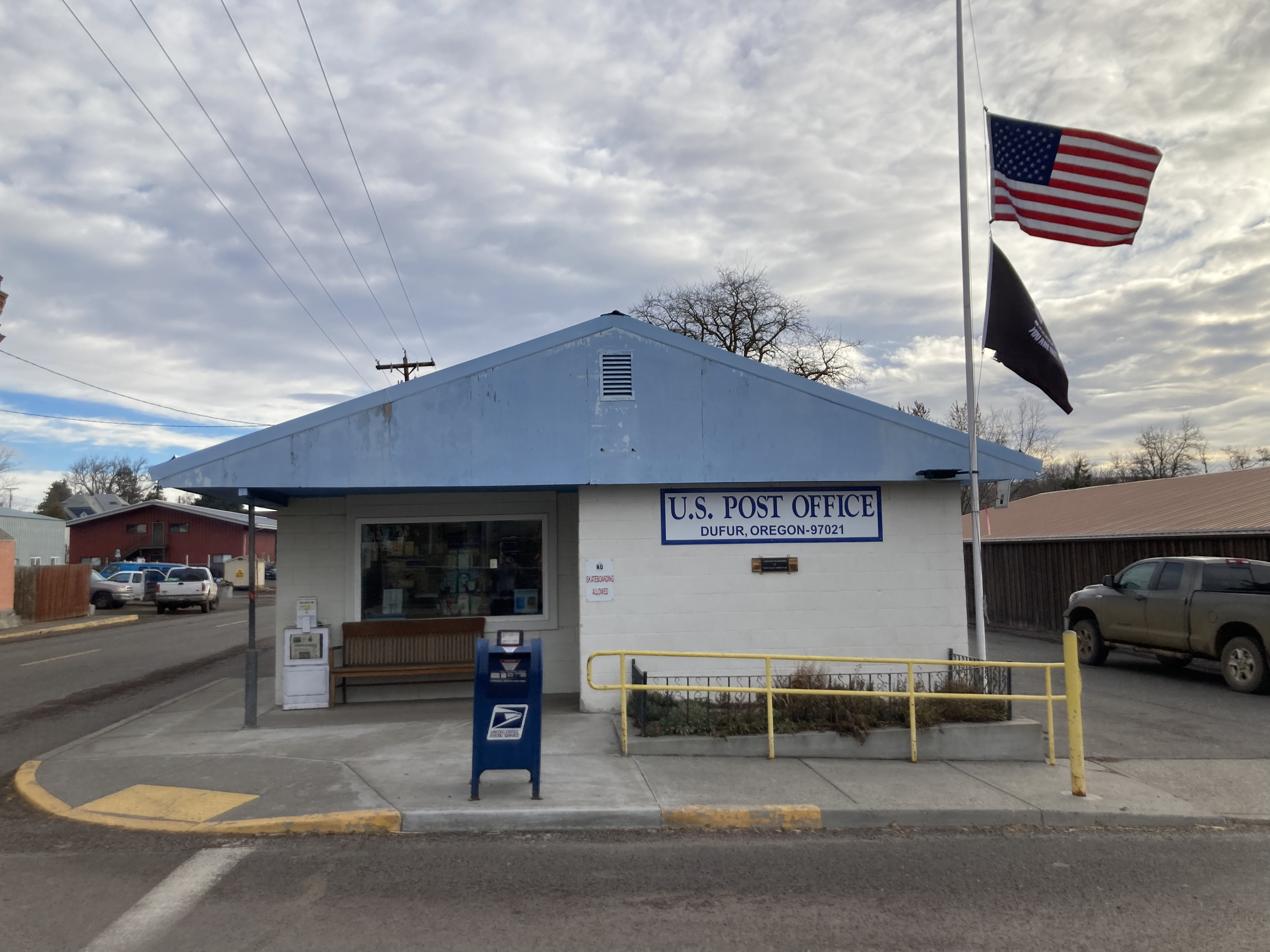
Dufur Post Office

On the second full weekend of August, Dufur holds its annual Threshing Bee, a harvest festival celebrating the local agricultural economy. The festival includes demonstrations of horse-drawn harvesting equipment, and a steam tractor that powers a belt-driven threshing machine.

== Notable people ==
- Shemia Fagan, former Oregon Secretary of State, former Oregon State Representative and State Senator

== See also ==
- Great Southern Railroad
- U.S. Route 197
- Charles E. Nelson House in Dufur
- Long Hollow Fire
