= Substation Fire =

2018 wildfire in the U.S. state of Oregon

- Part of the 2018 Oregon wildfires
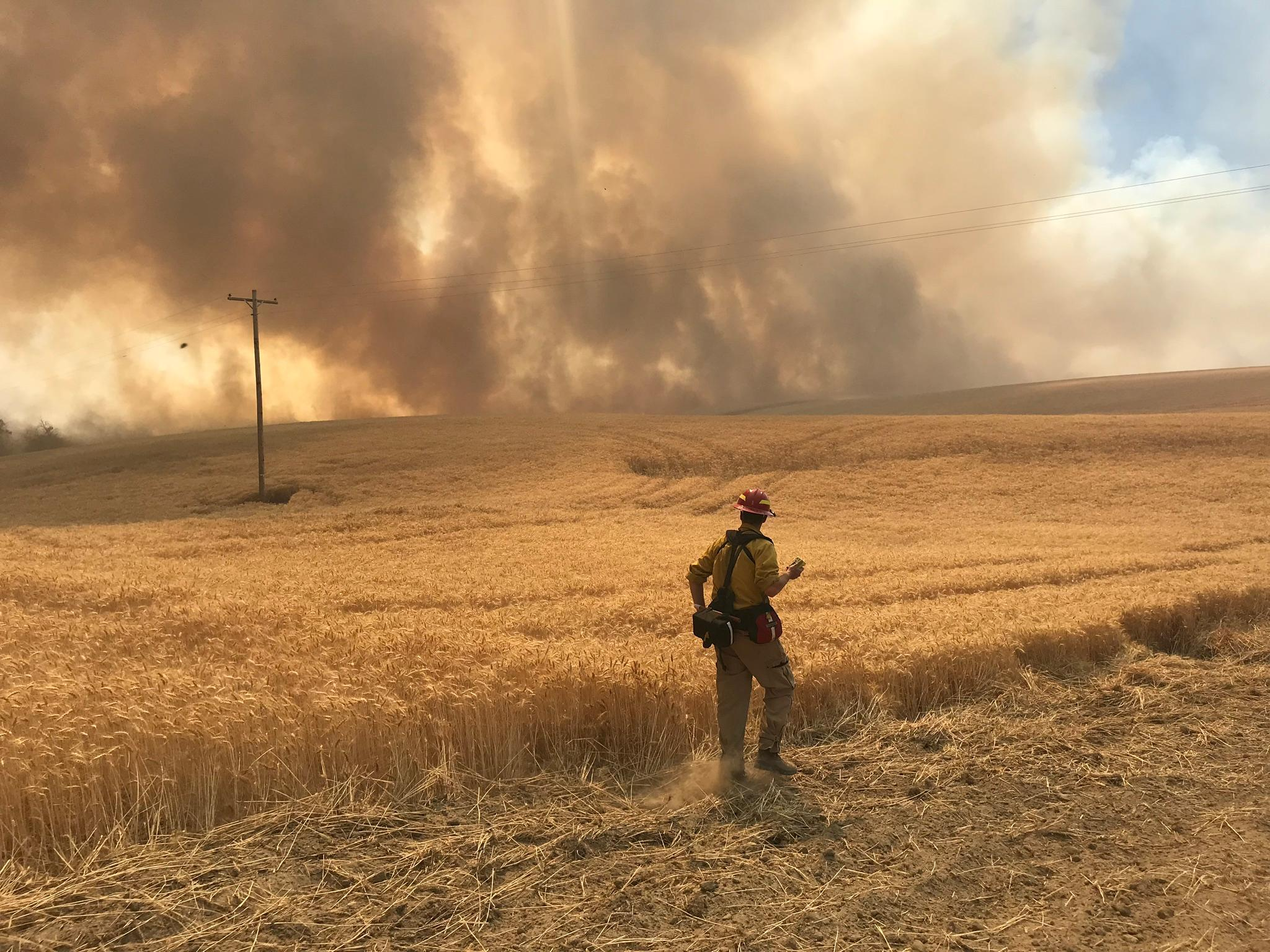
- A firefighter assessing a fire line during the Substation Fire
- Date: July 17, 2018 – August 2, 2018
- Location: Private land, The Dalles, Oregon, United States
- Coordinates: 45.576°N 121.103°W

Statistics
- Burned area: 78,425 acres (317 km^{2})
- Land use: Private

Ignition
- Cause: Unknown

Map
- Location of fire in Oregon

Location of Substation Fire

The Substation Fire was a wildfire in the U.S. state of Oregon near The Dalles. The fire was first reported on July 17, 2018, and had burned 78,425 acres (317 km^{2}).

== Incidents ==
The Substation Fire was reported, burning on private land, in the late afternoon on July 17, 2018, five miles south of The Dalles, two miles west of Moro and near the border of Grass Valley. Strong winds caused the fire to grow rapidly, with the fire moving over 18 miles in days. Agricultural and recreational areas suffered heavy damage and by July 18, Oregon Governor Kate Brown had declared a state of emergency, which included calling the Oregon National Guard to assist with fighting the fire and the communities of Moro, Grass Valley and Kent were evacuated. The next day, evacuation orders were lifted, however a temporary flight restriction was put in place in the area. On July 21, the fire spread another 10,000 acres (4,000 ha), swelling to 80,763 acres (32,684 ha).

As of July 23, the fire had destroyed 78,425 acres (317 km^{2}) and was 92 percent contained.

== Effects ==
One person was killed from the Substation Fire, a 64-year-old farmer. Officials believe he was trying to create a fire line. Four residential structures were destroyed, four others were damaged, and forty-eight outbuildings were destroyed. The Charles E. Nelson House, an iconic abandoned house, was destroyed by the fire.
