= Maupin, Oregon =

City in Wasco County, Oregon, United States

- City
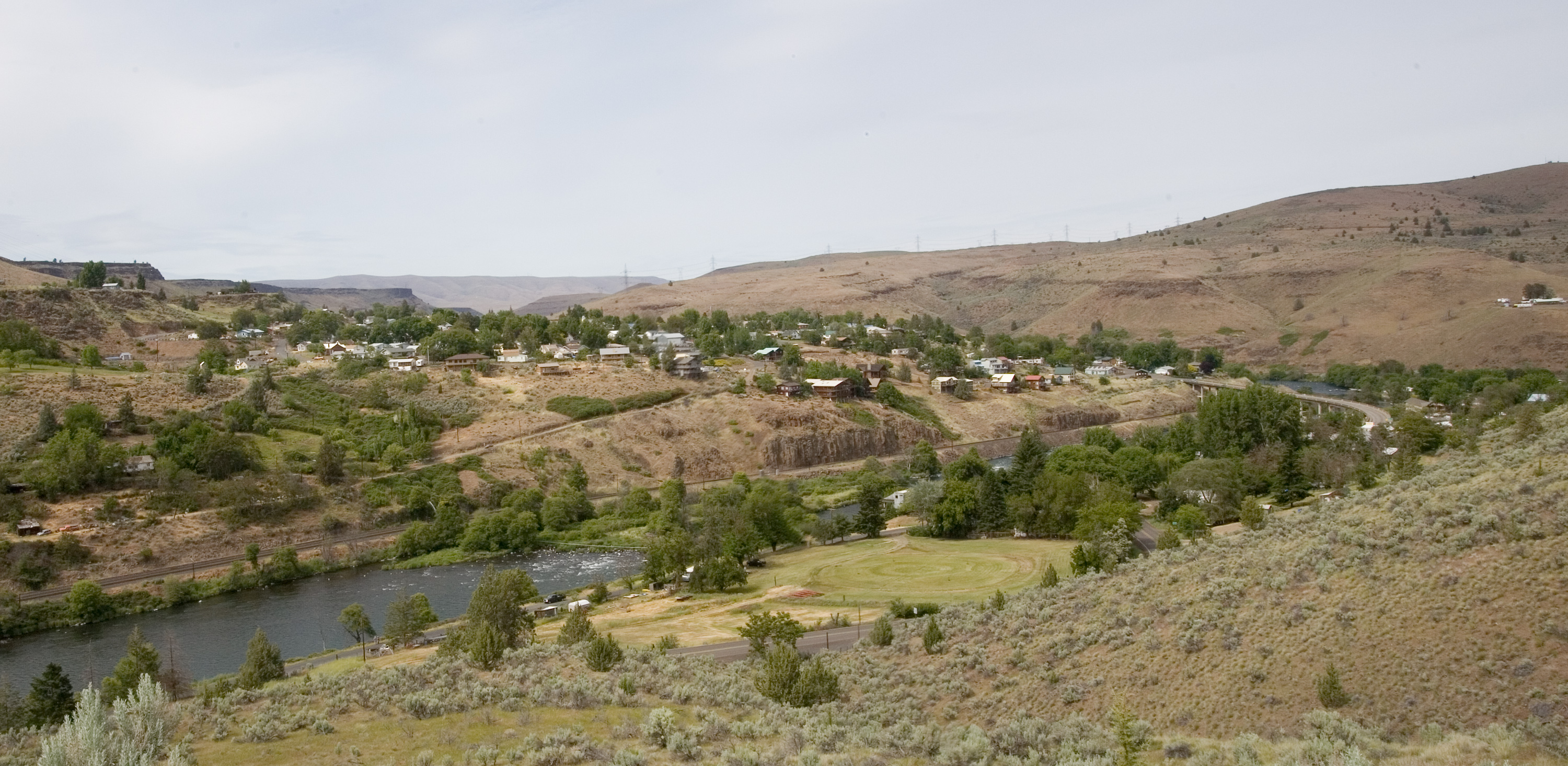
- Maupin and the Deschutes River, May 2007

- Location in Oregon
- Coordinates: 45°10′23″N 121°05′17″W
- Country: United States
- State: Oregon
- County: Wasco
- Incorporated: 1922

Area
  - Total: 1.45 sq mi (3.75 km^{2})
  - Land: 1.39 sq mi (3.61 km^{2})
  - Water: 0.054 sq mi (0.14 km^{2})
- Elevation: 1,227 ft (374 m)

Population (2020)
  - Total: 427
  - Density: 306.0/sq mi (118.15/km^{2})
- Time zone: UTC-8 (Pacific)
  - Summer (DST): UTC-7 (Pacific)
- ZIP code: 97037
- Area code: 541
- FIPS code: 41-46500
- GNIS feature ID: 2411052
- Website: cityofmaupin.org

Maupin is a city in Wasco County, Oregon, United States. Located on the Deschutes River, much of the city's economy is related to the river through outdoor activities, such as fishing and rafting. As of the 2020 census, Maupin had a population of 427.

== History ==
Maupin is named for Howard Maupin, a pioneer who had a farm and ferry at the town's location in the late 19th century. Originally named Hunts Ferry after the owner of a ferry on the Deschutes River, the name was changed to Maupin Ferry by town founder William H. Staats. The city's name was shortened to Maupin in about 1909.

== Geography ==
According to the United States Census Bureau, the city has a total area of 1.45 square miles (3.76 km^{2}), of which, 1.4 square miles (3.63 km^{2}) is land and 0.05 square miles (0.13 km^{2}) is water. Road access is provided by U.S. Route 197, which crosses the Deschutes River in town at one of the few places the Deschutes can be crossed north of Madras.

=== Climate ===
This region experiences warm (but not hot) and dry summers, with no average monthly temperatures above 71.6 °F (22.0 °C). Being in the high desert, the nights cool down from the daytime heat. According to the Köppen Climate Classification system, Maupin has a warm-summer Mediterranean climate, abbreviated "Csb" on climate maps.

== Demographics ==
Historical population
| Census | Pop. | Note | %± |
|---|---|---|---|
| 1920 | 198 | | — |
| 1930 | 240 | | 21.2% |
| 1940 | 267 | | 11.3% |
| 1950 | 312 | | 16.9% |
| 1960 | 381 | | 22.1% |
| 1970 | 428 | | 12.3% |
| 1980 | 495 | | 15.7% |
| 1990 | 456 | | −7.9% |
| 2000 | 411 | | −9.9% |
| 2010 | 418 | | 1.7% |
| 2020 | 427 | | 2.2% |
U.S. Decennial Census

Racial composition as of the 2020 census
| Race | Number | Percent |
|---|---|---|
| White | 376 | 88.1% |
| Black or African American | 4 | 0.9% |
| American Indian and Alaska Native | 6 | 1.4% |
| Asian | 1 | 0.2% |
| Native Hawaiian and Other Pacific Islander | 2 | 0.5% |
| Some other race | 7 | 1.6% |
| Two or more races | 31 | 7.3% |
| Hispanic or Latino (of any race) | 12 | 2.8% |

=== 2020 census ===
As of the 2020 census, Maupin had a population of 427. The median age was 57.8 years. 12.4% of residents were under the age of 18 and 38.9% of residents were 65 years of age or older. For every 100 females there were 99.5 males, and for every 100 females age 18 and over there were 98.9 males age 18 and over.

0% of residents lived in urban areas, while 100.0% lived in rural areas.

There were 206 households in Maupin, of which 18.0% had children under the age of 18 living in them. Of all households, 42.7% were married-couple households, 26.2% were households with a male householder and no spouse or partner present, and 27.2% were households with a female householder and no spouse or partner present. About 34.9% of all households were made up of individuals and 24.8% had someone living alone who was 65 years of age or older.

There were 310 housing units, of which 33.5% were vacant. Among occupied housing units, 75.2% were owner-occupied and 24.8% were renter-occupied. The homeowner vacancy rate was 8.8% and the rental vacancy rate was <0.1%.

=== 2010 census ===
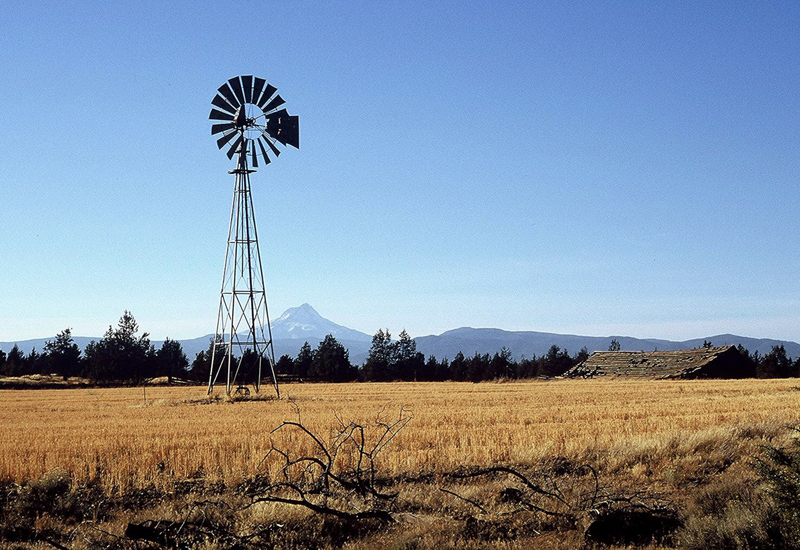
Old farm near Maupin with Mount Hood in the distance,October 2001

As of the 2010 census, there were 418 people, 199 households, and 113 families residing in the city. The population density was about 299 inhabitants per square mile (115.4/km^{2}). There were 274 housing units at an average density of about 196 per square mile (75.7/km^{2}). The racial makeup of the city was 95.7% White, 0.7% Native American, 0.2% Asian, 0.2% Pacific Islander, 0.2% from other races, and 2.9% from two or more races. Hispanic or Latino of any race were 1.2% of the population.

There were 199 households, of which about 20% had children under the age of 18 living with them, about 50% were married couples living together, 3.5% had a female householder with no husband present, 3% had a male householder with no wife present, and about 43% were non-families. About 41% of all households were made up of individuals, and about 21% had someone living alone who was 65 years of age or older. The average household size was 1.98 and the average family size was 2.65.

The median age in the city was about 56 years. About 15% of residents were under the age of 18; about 5% were between the ages of 18 and 24; 15.5% were from 25 to 44; 32.8% were from 45 to 64; and about 32% were 65 years of age or older. The gender makeup of the city was about 51% male and 49% female.

== Education ==
Maupin is served by the South Wasco County School District, a two-school district that comprises Maupin Grade School and South Wasco County Junior/Senior High School, both of which are in Maupin.

== In popular culture ==
Scenes from the movie My Own Private Idaho were filmed in Maupin in late 1990.

== See also ==
- List of cities in Oregon
- Boxcar Fire
