= 2026 in Oregon =

- Decades: 2000s; 2010s; 2020s
- See also: History of Oregon; Historical outline of Oregon; List of years in Oregon; 2026 in the United States

The following is a list of events of the year 2026 in Oregon, as well as predicted and scheduled events that have not yet occurred.

== Politics and government ==
=== State government ===
- Governor: Tina Kotek (D)
- Secretary of State: Tobias Read (D)
- 83rd Oregon Legislative Assembly

== Events ==
=== Ongoing ===
- 2025–2026 Portland, Oregon protests
- 2026 Oregon wildfires

=== January ===
- January 8 – A Border Patrol agent shoots two people in Portland.
- January 18 – Portland bar and restaurant Interurban closes.
- January 30
  - The Skanner, one of Oregon's only Black community newspapers, closes after 50 years of publication.
  - Thousands of people participate in a nationwide general strike against ICE, gathering in Eugene, Portland, and Springfield. Hundreds of students in Portland stage walk-outs, many joining the protest of more than 1,000 outside the state's only ICE facility. A protest at a federal building in Eugene is declared a riot, and tear gas is deployed.
- January 31 – Over 1,000 protestors, including children and labor groups affiliated with unions like the SEIU, Oregon Education Association, and Oregon AFL–CIO, gather for a peaceful, non-destructive march past the ICE facility in Portland. Without providing any warning or directions to the crowd, federal agents deploy smoke and tear gas, which leads to public outcry, criticism from city officials, and increased scrutiny of previous uses of crowd control munitions at the facility.

=== February ===
- February 2 – The 2026 legislative session begins.
- February 5 – The Portland Chamber Orchestra announces its dissolution, citing financial reasons.
- February 6 – Researchers in Oregon and Nevada publish a paper describing archaeological artifacts found in Cougar Mountain Cave and the Paisley Caves in Central Oregon. One of these artifacts is two pieces of animal hide sewn together with cord, and it is estimated to be more than 12,000 years old (created during the Ice Age), making it the oldest sewn object to be preserved into the 21st century.
- February 20
  - Prestige Roseland XIII: The End
  - Amid continuing recovery efforts from the storms that impacted the state in December 2025, Governor Tina Kotek requests a federal disaster declaration and funding from FEMA to help with recovery in Clackamas, Hood River, Lane, Lincoln, Linn, Polk, Tillamook, Union, and Yamhill counties.
- February 27
  - Portland implements a new 180-day ban on the use of chemical irritants at the city's ICE facility while the city government works on developing more permanent rules.
  - The 2026 Fisher Poets Gathering begins in Astoria.

=== March ===
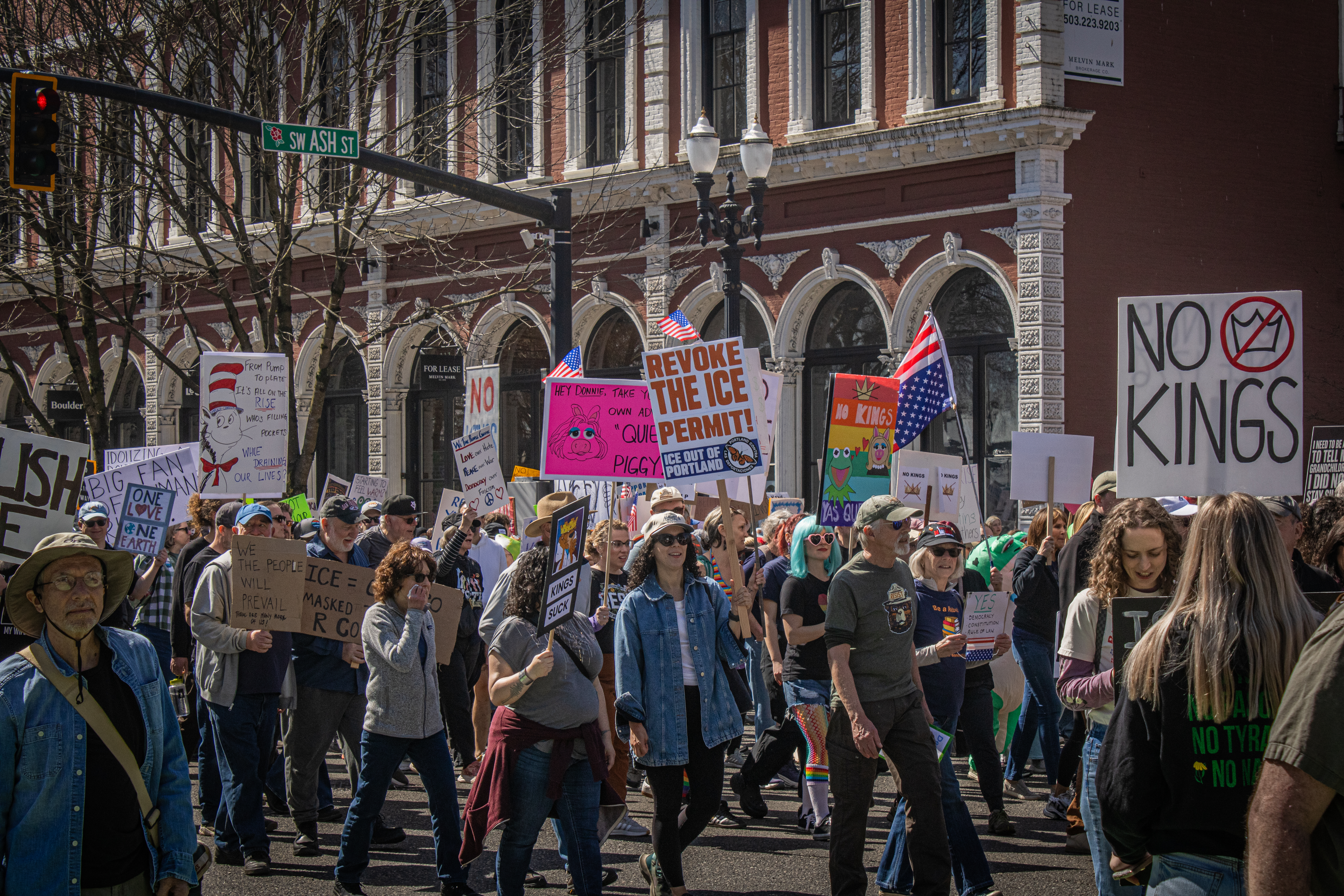
No Kings protest in Portland, March 28

- March 6 – A federal judge limits ICE's use of tear gas during protests.
- March 28 – Tens of thousands in cities across Oregon attend the third wave of No Kings Protests against President Donald Trump.

=== April ===
- April 6 – A worker dies on the job at the Amazon warehouse in Troutdale, sparking renewed discussion about working conditions at the company.
- April 9 – The Thompson Elk statue is reinstalled in downtown Portland.
- April 23 – Nike announces layoffs of around 1,400 employees.

=== May ===
- May 2 – A man drives a car with explosives into an athletic club in Portland. The driver is identified as a former employee of the club, and he is the only fatality.
- May 16 – The new building of the East County Library opens.
- May 25 – The Zen Fire starts near Clarno and the Spring Basin Wilderness, burning 1,000 acres before the end of the day.
- May 26 – The Oregon State Capitol plaza reopens to the public, including new artwork showcasing the culture of several Native American tribes in Oregon.
- May 29 – Three people are arrested in Aloha after stealing $36,000 of retail goods from several stores in Seattle. Their vehicle is recovered near the Tualatin Valley Highway.

=== June ===
- June 3 – Two earthquakes of magnitudes 5.1 and 5.7 strike off the coast near the Oregon–California border.
- June 10–13 – The 2026 NCAA Division I Outdoor Track and Field Championships are held in Eugene.
- June 18 – Governor Kotek signs a law ensuring statewide access to the Imagination Library, which sends free books to young children every month.

=== July ===
- July 10–12 – Oregon Country Fair
- July 13 – Sean Murphy is hired as superintendent of the Oregon State Hospital.
- July 18–19 – Portland Pride Festival
- July 25 – Wildfires close parts of Highway 26 near Madras and Warm Springs.
- July 28 – Using a modern genetic testing and genealogy techniques, police identify a body from a 1965 cold case as Armes Henry Lahti, World War II veteran and professional fisherman from Astoria.

=== August ===
- Early August – Smoke from ongoing wildfires causes poor air quality in almost the entire state of Oregon.
- August 5–9 – The 2026 World Athletics U20 Championships is held in Eugene.
- August 8 – The Lloyd Center shopping mall in Portland closes after 66 years.
- August 12 – Sean Murphy resigns from his position as superintendent of the Oregon State Hospital, one month after starting the job.
- August 17 – Governor Kotek declares August to be National Emergency Management Awareness Month in the state of Oregon.
- August 23 – A man kills five people and several animals at a rural property in Forest Grove. The suspect is later found dead from a self-inflicted gunshot in Enumclaw, Washington. The victims are identified as his girlfriend, her mother, grandmother, her friend, and friend's boyfriend.
- August 27 – The U.S. Department of Justice files a lawsuit against the government of Oregon and multiple colleges in the state, challenging a 2013 policy of offering in-state tuition and financial aid to undocumented students.
- August 28–September 7 – The Oregon State Fair is held in Salem.

=== September ===
- September 8 – In an incident at Portland's Benson Polytechnic High School, a 15-year-old student is arrested for allegedly mixing hazardous chemicals in the school cafeteria. He passes out from the fumes and is hospitalized. Seven staff members are treated for chemical exposure. The teenager is later charged with several offenses, including attempted murder and domestic terrorism.
- September 9
  - Portland City Council votes to rename César E Chávez Boulevard to Campesinos Boulevard following public allegations of sexual abuse by Chavez.
  - The owner of the defunct West Coast Game Park Safari in Bandon is sentenced to seven and a half years in prison for animal neglect, methamphetamine distribution, and other crimes.
- September 20 – Pro- and anti-transgender protesters claah outside The Sports Bra in Portland.

=== October ===
- October 11 – A Republican super PAC, Defending Main Street, accidentally buys attack ads against Senate candidate Troy Jackson to air in Portland, Oregon, instead of the intended market of Portland, Maine.
- October 15
  - The Trump administration sues the city of Portland over its ban on law enforcement, including federal officers, from wearing masks on-duty.
  - Four people are killed in a mass shooting at Silver Rail Elementary School in Bend. The 16-year-old gunman is shot killed by an armed bystander who saw him break into the school.
  - A man stabs two people in Downtown Portland before being shot and killed by a responding police officer.

=== November ===
- November 3: 2026 Oregon elections:
  - 2026 Oregon House of Representatives election
  - 2026 Oregon State Senate election
  - 2026 Portland, Oregon City Council election
  - 2026 Salem, Oregon mayoral election
  - 2026 Oregon gubernatorial election: Tina Kotek wins reelection.
  - 2026 United States House of Representatives elections in Oregon
  - 2026 United States Senate election in Oregon: Jeff Merkley wins reelection.
- November 17 – The Oregon Department of Justice sues OpenAI.

== Sports ==
- 2025–26 Oregon Ducks men's basketball team
- 2025–26 Oregon Ducks women's basketball team
- 2025–26 Portland Pilots women's basketball team
- 2025–26 Portland Pilots women's basketball team
- 2025–26 Oregon State Beavers men's basketball team
- 2025–26 Oregon State Beavers women's basketball team
- 2025–26 Portland State Vikings men's basketball team
- 2025–26 Portland State Vikings women's basketball team
- 2025–26 Portland Trail Blazers season
- 2026 Oregon Ducks football team
- 2026 Oregon State Beavers baseball team
- 2026 Portland Fire season
- 2026 Portland Hearts of Pine season
- 2026 Portland Timbers season
- 2026 Portland Thorns FC season

== Deaths ==
- January 4
  - Claire Hall (born 1959), politician
  - Donald C. Rogers, sound engineer
- January 5 – Tom Cherones (born 1939), television director and producer
- January 7 – Rebecca Kilgore (born 1949), jazz vocalist
- February 15 – Paul Brainerd (born 1947), businessman and computer programmer
- February 17 – Avel Gordly (born 1947), politician
- February 20 – Rod Monroe (born 1942), politician
- March 29
  - Lewis Goldberg (born 1932), psychologist
  - Jeffrey Paul Cutlip (born 1949), serial killer
- April 19 – Keith Jellum (born 1939), artist
- May 3 – Charles W. Curtis (born 1926), mathematician and historian
- May 4 – George Trahern (born 1936), politician
- May 12 – Jack Taylor (born 1926), actor
- May 15 – Brian Lindstrom (born 1961), filmmaker
- May 21 – Julienne Bušić (born 1948), writer and co-conspirator of Zvonko Bušić
- May 24 – Gene Derfler (born 1924), politician
- June 2 – Ray Lampkin (born 1947), boxer
- June 3 – Bob Packwood (born 1932), politician
- June 14 – Anne Schedeen (born 1949), actor
- June 30 – Joe Smith (born 1935), politician
- July 20 – Zale Parry (born 1933), scuba diver, photographer, and actor
- July 26 – Mike Clock (born 1935), wrestling coach and mathematics professor

== See also ==
- 2026 in the United States
