= 2024 in Oregon =

- Decades: 2000s; 2010s; 2020s
- See also: History of Oregon; Historical outline of Oregon; List of years in Oregon; 2024 in the United States

The year 2024 in Oregon involved several major events.

== Politics and government ==
=== Incumbents ===
- Governor: Tina Kotek (D)
- Secretary of State: LaVonne Griffin-Valade (D)

== Events ==
- 2024 Oregon wildfires

=== January ===
- January 5 – Alaska Airlines Flight 1282: An Alaska Airlines Boeing 737 Max 9 aircraft loses a door section of its fuselage mid-air and makes an emergency landing in Portland, with no major injuries reported. The Federal Aviation Administration subsequently orders a temporary grounding of all 737 Max 9 aircraft in response to the incident.
- January 17 – Three people are killed when a power line falls on a car during a major winter storm in Portland.
- January 21 – The death toll from the ongoing winter storms in the United States increases to 89, with most of the deaths reported in Oregon and Tennessee.
- January 31 – The Governor of Oregon Tina Kotek declares a 90-day state of emergency in Portland in response to record deaths from fentanyl.

=== February ===
- February 1 – The Oregon Supreme Court rules that the Oregon legislators who were absent for 6 weeks in 2023 cannot run for reelection because of Oregon Ballot Measure 113.

=== March ===
- March 1 – The Oregon Legislature approves a bill to partially roll back 2020 Oregon Ballot Measure 110; possession of small amounts of drugs will be criminalized again starting in September.
- March 15 – A panel falls off of a Boeing 737 during a United flight from San Francisco to Medford.

=== April ===
- April 19 – Nike announces layoffs for 740 employees in Beaverton.
- April 20 – The Little Yamsay Fire begins.
- April 29 – 2024 University of Oregon pro-Palestinian campus occupation begins
- April 30 – Gaza war – The Oregon Food Bank releases a statement calling for a ceasefire in Palestine.

=== May ===
- May 2
  - 10 Portland Police vehicles are set on fire; a group called "Rachel Corrie's Ghost Brigade" claims responsibility in a social media post.
  - The Portland Police clear protesters who were occupying the library at Portland State University.
- May 10 – Debbie Colbert becomes the first woman director of the Oregon Department of Fish and Wildlife.
- May 21 – Crook County votes in favor of Measure 7–86 Greater Idaho movement. This makes it the 13th county in Oregon that has passed a similar ballot measure resulting in the majority of Counties in the proposed Greater Idaho map having voted in favor.
  - 2024 Oregon Republican presidential primary
  - 2024 Oregon Democratic presidential primary
  - 2024 Multnomah County District Attorney election
- May 22 – Nathan Vasquez is elected Multnomah County District Attorney.
- May 23 – 2024 University of Oregon pro-Palestinian campus occupation ends

=== June ===
- June 1 – Portland Rose Festival – The Starlight Parade is held in Portland.
- June 8 – Portland Rose Festival – The Grand Floral Parade is held in Portland. Pro-Palestinian protesters unsuccessfully attempt to block the parade; 8 are arrested.
- June 14 – At Oaks Park, more than 2 dozen people are stuck upside down on a pendulum ride for about 30 minutes.
- June 20 – People gather at the Portland waterfront for the World Refugee Day Walk.
- June 22 – John McDougall dies in Portland at 77.

=== July ===
- July 17 – The Durkee Fire is ignited by lightning. In a few days' time, it will grow to be considered the biggest fire in the country.
- July 20–21 – The Portland Pride Waterfront Festival is celebrated. The parade is on Sunday, the same day that Joe Biden withdraws from the 2024 election.

=== August ===
- August 2 – Coraline's Curious Cat Trail is installed in Portland.
- August 20 – A railroad trestle in Oak Grove, Oregon is set ablaze; anonymous anarchists take responsibility in a blog post.
- August 21 – The Durkee Fire is 95% contained.
- August 31 – A plane from the Troutdale Airport crashes into a townhome in Fairview, killing 3.

=== September ===
- September 1 – The partial rollback of 2020 Oregon ballot measure 110 comes into effect, meaning that possession of small amounts of drugs is once again treated as a crime.
- September 4 – U.S. Bank announces that it will not renew its lease in the U.S. Bancorp Tower.
- September 9 – Gonzo journalist Alissa Azar is sentenced to two weeks in jail and three years' probation for her role in a fight with Proud Boys at Clackamette Park in Oregon City three years prior.
- September 13
  - The 2024 Boeing machinists' strike begins, involving workers in Oregon and Washington.
  - Presidential candidate Donald Trump calls for the Columbia River to be diverted to California to help with drought conditions there.
- September 15 – Volunteers gather in Portland on Islamic Day of Dignity to provide resources and services to homeless and poor people for free.
- September 22 – 10 goats and a llama are brought to Eastmoreland Golf Course as an eco-friendly way to deal with weeds and overgrowth.

=== October ===
- October 8 – Jeff Chow of Portland restaurant Mama Chow's Kitchen is hospitalized after a fall while hiking in the Columbia River Gorge.
- October 15 – Intel announces that they will lay off 1,300 employees at their Hillsboro location.
- October 20
  - An Alaska Airlines flight makes an emergency landing at the Portland airport due to a bird strike.
  - Shari's permanently closes all of their restaurants in Oregon.
- October 27 – An anonymous artist installs a statue of Donald Trump, titled In Honor of a Lifetime of Sexual Assault, in Portland. Within 24 hours, the statue is beheaded, then almost completely destroyed.
- October 28 – Two ballot boxes – one in Vancouver and one in Portland – are set on fire, damaging the ballots inside.
- October 30 – The Oregon Department of Agriculture confirms the first-ever U.S. case of avian flu in a pig at a small farm in Crook County.

=== November ===
- November 5
  - 2024 Oregon Senate election
  - Schools in the Riverdale School District are temporarily shut down due to a bomb threat.
  - 2024 Oregon Attorney General election
  - 2024 Oregon House of Representatives election
  - 2024 United States presidential election in Oregon
  - 2024 United States House of Representatives elections in Oregon
  - 2024 Portland, Oregon, mayoral election
  - 2024 Portland, Oregon, City Council election
  - 2024 Oregon State Senate election
  - 2024 Oregon State Treasurer election
  - 2024 Oregon Secretary of State election
- November 6 – The 2024 Boeing machinists' strike ends.
- November 18 – November 2024 Northeast Pacific bomb cyclone forms

=== December ===
- Early December – Multiple Oregon public officials receive letters calling for them to track "brown people" and people suspected of being immigrants in anticipation of an immigration crackdown in January, after Trump's inauguration. Several officials, such as the mayors of Toledo and Lincoln City, publicly reject the letters.
- December 5 – A tsunami warning is issued along the coast of Southern Oregon after an earthquake strikes about 45 miles off the coast of Eureka, California.
