= 2026 Oregon wildfires =

- Multiple fires blanketing Northern and Eastern Oregon in smoke on July 26
- Date: May 7, 2026 - present

Statistics
- Total fires: 1,873
- Total area: 2,543,011 acres (1,029,120 ha; 3,973.455 sq mi) (September 22)

Impacts
- Deaths: 2

The 2026 Oregon wildfire season is an ongoing and severe wildfire season that is primarily affecting central, north and Eastern Oregon. According to officials, they anticipated this season would potentially have been severe. In Southern Oregon, restrictions in Jackson County and Josephine County were initiated with the start of the fire season in May 2026, with it quickly escalating into a major lightning sparked wildfire event by July.

In September 2026, the Oregon Legislature’s Joint Emergency Board approved about $108 million for the Oregon Department of Forestry and $15 million to the Department of the State Fire Marshal to help the agencies cover the costs of the wildfire season.

The Oregon Department of Forestry announced an end to wildfire season on November 4, 2026, with officials noting 2026's wildfires set a new record for burned acreage in the state, with over 2.5 million acres burned.

== Background ==
"Fire season" in Oregon typically begins in mid-May and ends with the first rains that normally begins in late September. Drought, snowpack levels, and local weather conditions play a role in Oregon's fire season, particularly in Eastern and Southwest Oregon. During peak fire season from July to September, most wildfires are caused by lightning, while ignitions in the early and later parts of the season are related to human activity. Warm, dry conditions in summer heighten the wildfire risk. After over 100 years of fire suppression and prevention of all fires, there is now an abundance of fuel. Climate change is leading to a reduced snowpack with an earlier and reduced snowmelt, so there is a higher risk for areas that receive wildfires.

By July 2026, despite a relatively slow start to the season, thousands of lightning strikes sparked numerous wildfires that expanded across north central Oregon, with many prompting immediate evacuations for areas many miles wide and catching firefighters off guard by the sudden and dramatic increase in activity, especially in Wheeler, Gilliam and Baker counties. Two major wildfire complexes occurred after most of the major wildfires merged, especially into the Crosswhite fire which quickly burned passed 100,000 acres. This fire was a part of the Rowe Creek Complex, and the Hay Creek Complex, a little farther north, also contained several large and rapidly growing fires due to extremely dry conditions and an ongoing heatwave. Multiple west coast task forces and the Oregon National Guard were deployed to help fight these fires and other fires to the south, north, and east that were also showing significant growth. Smoke from all of these wildfires contributed to widespread very unhealthy air quality, with the entire state having the worst air quality in the United States for a prolonged period, during which air quality advisories were issued. The Crosswhite fire also merged with the 28,000 acre Box Springs fire on July 28, bringing its total above 170,000 acres as crews continued to battle extreme fire weather conditions, primarily in the form of widespread Red Flag warnings and more lightning storms sparking even more wildfires across the state, as over 2,000 lightning strikes occurred within only a few hours of each other.

In the beginning of August, the National Interagency Fire Center and Oregon Department of Forestry were both reporting that the season-to-date cumulative wildfire acreage was over two million acres, making 2026 the state's most active wildfire season. This surpassed the previous record, set in 2024, when 1.93 million acres burned in Oregon.

== List of wildfires ==
The following is a list of fires that burned more than 1,000 acres (400 ha), or produced significant structural damage or casualties.

Name	County	Acres	Start date	Containment date (Note: Containment means that fire crews have established and secured control lines around the fire's perimeter. These lines are artificial barriers, like trenches or cleared vegetation, designed to stop the fire's spread, or natural barriers like rivers. Containment reflects progress in managing the fire but does not necessarily mean the fire is starved of fuel, under control, or put out.)	Notes	Ref
Pine Mountain	Deschutes	2,589	May 7 (Note: Prescribed burn escaped on May 7 but was initially conducted on May 1)	May 11	Started from an escaped prescribed burn. Burned southeast of Bend.	
Zen	Wasco	1,634	May 25	May 29	Burned 5 miles (8.0 km) south of Clarno.	
Frontage	Baker	1,938	June 6	June 7	Undetermined cause. Burned near Huntington. Prompted evacuations for Farewell Bend State Park and closed Interstate 84 and U.S. 30.	
Unknown	Umatilla	6	June 9	June 9	Burned in Umatilla. Destroyed one home, five outbuildings, and several vehicles.	
Old Emigrant	Umatilla	1,424	June 16	June 21	Prompted Level 2 evacuations north of Interstate 84 south of Mission.	
Basin	Malheur	1,404	June 20	June 21	Lightning-caused. Burned southeast of U.S. 95, 10 miles (16 km) south of Rome.	
Dry Creek	Malheur	3,205	June 20	June 21	Burned 10 miles (16 km) south of Rome.	
Unknown	Umatilla	1,300	June 21	June 21	Burning in Milton-Freewater.	
Lytle	Malheur	6,063	June 22	June 25	Burned 3 miles (4.8 km) south of Vale.	
Antelope Creek	Wasco	1,347	July 4	July 6	Cause under investigation. Burned 1 mile (1.6 km) north of Antelope and prompted evacuation orders.	
North Cayuse	Umatilla	4,887	July 4	August 5	Burned near Adams and prompted evacuations.	
Salmon	Baker, Grant	1,433	July 7	86%	Lightning-caused. Includes the Greenhorn Fire. Burning west of Greenhorn and prompting evacuations. Injured two firefighters.	
Olive Butte	Grant	3,092	July 7	94%	Lightning-caused. Burning in Sumpter and prompting evacuations.	
Anthony	Baker	2,584	July 7	89%	Lightning-caused. Burning in the Elkhorn Mountains and prompting evacuations.	
East Evans Creek	Jackson	15,580	July 10	98%	Burning 14 miles (23 km) northeast of Rogue River and prompting evacuations.	
Lower Dry Creek	Umatilla	8,096	July 15	July 18	Burned near Weston prompting evacuation of the entire city. One home and multiple structures have been lost. The fire has closed down highways 11 and 204, and cut power to the City of Athena.	
Hay Creek Complex	Gilliam, Sherman, Wasco, Wheeler	200,292	July 15	August 8	Lightning-caused complex comprising the Hopkin, Porcupine Ridge, Hoag, Little Buck, and Cottonwood fires. The Hoag and Cottonwood fires to the north merged, while in the south the Little Buck and Porcupine Ridge fires merged, nearly merging with the Crosswhite East fire at the John Day River near the John Day Fossil Beds National Monument - Clarno Unit.	
Rowe Creek Complex	Crook, Jefferson, Wasco, Wheeler	373,927	July 15	October 2	Complex of multiple lightning-caused fires, prompting widespread evacuations for a large region of central Oregon. Though also including the Camel Hump and Deep Canyon fires, it comprises primarily the Crosswhite East fire, which merged with the Pats Cabin, Cove Creek, and 059 fires on July 19, Box Springs fire on July 23, and Green Mountain and Brewer fires on July 27. The area where the Crosswhite East, Green Mountain, and Brewer fires is managed as the Rowe Creek Complex - West Zone. Overall, the Rowe Creek Complex burned a majority of the land in the John Day Fossil Beds National Monument. 1 fatality from the Brewer fire.	
Akawa Butte	Jefferson	27,491	July 16	August 6	Lightning-caused. Burning southwest of Lake Billy Chinook and prompting evacuations, moving to the south and west. It destroyed two homes, including the stone house at Wildhaven Preserve.	
Coyote	Crook	17,448	July 16	89%	Lightning-caused. Burning south of Post. Prompting evacuations and threatening structures.	
Paradise	Umatilla, Wallowa, Columbia (WA), Walla Walla (WA)	9654	July 16	86%	Lightning-caused. Burning on the border of Washington in the Umatilla National Forest.	
Henry	Crook	29,889	July 16	97%	Burning 1.7 miles (2.7 km) south of Paulina.	
Powder River	Baker	21,088	July 16	96%	Burning 0.5 miles (0.80 km) west of the Powder River and threatening structures.	
Egypt	Harney	4,553	July 16	82%	Lightning-caused. Burning 13 miles (21 km) north of Riley.	
Hagen	Umatilla & Union	59,515.3	July 16	19%	Burning 4 miles (6.4 km) east of Gibbon. Prompting evacuations.	
Bologna	Grant	2,425	July 17	August 7	Burning 9 miles (14 km) northwest of Monument.	
Burnt Creek	Wallowa	4,169	July 17	87%	Lightning-caused. Burning 23 miles (37 km) north of Enterprise.	
Cow Camp Complex	Malheur	8,044	July 21	July 24	Included eight individual fires. Burned north of Brogan.	
Castle	Douglas	3,612	July 22	67%	Likely lightning-caused. Burning northwest of Crater Lake National Park.	
Ten Mile	Jefferson, Wasco	4,834	July 23	July 30	Burned and caused evacuations along Route 97.	
Big Grass	Malheur, Owyhee (ID)	578,637	July 23	September 12	Burning southeast of Jordan Valley. Largest wildfire in Oregon history, though partially burning in Owyhee County, Idaho.	
Stubble	Harney	15,673	July 23	93%	Burning south of Malheur Lake and prompting evacuations.	
Crowley	Malheur	2,500	July 23	July 25	Burned in Harper.	
Shingle	Baker	73,092	July 23	70%	Lightning-caused. Burning 13 miles (21 km) southeast of Mitchell and prompting evacuations.	
Bench	Jefferson	67,080	July 23	86%	Burning 9 miles (14 km) southwest of Warm Springs and prompting evacuations. Merged with the Beachcomb Fire on July 26.	
Grasshopper	Hood River, Wasco	93,971	July 23	98%	Burning east of Government Camp and prompting evacuations around Mount Hood and Pine Hollow.	
Bald Mountain	Harney, Malheur	76,134	July 23	67%	Burning across the Stonehouse Wilderness Study Area.	
Fox	Baker	78,903	July 24	September 7	Burning in Huntington and prompting evacuations. Reached the Powder River Fire burn scar on July 30. The fire destroyed 3 homes, and Huntington Fire Chief Eric Bronson was injured while fighting the fire.	
Hat	Malheur	44,122	July 24	99%	Burning 1 mile (1.6 km) east of Hat Butte.	
Jackass Butte	Harney	24,724	July 24	92%	Burning on Jackass Mountain.	
Second Flat	Harney	105,854.3	July 24	96%	Burning north of U.S. 20 and prompting evacuations in around the city of Burns.	
Coleman Creek	Harney, Malheur	308,863	July 24	99%	Burning in the vicinity of Warm Springs Reservoir and threatened the town of Juntura.	
Eggo	Wallowa	4,225	August 1	95%	Likely lightning-caused.	
Round Butte	Jefferson	1,163	August 1	90%	Prompted some evacuations near Madras.	
Wrights Spring	Klamath	55,134	August 5	September 29	Burning north of Klamath Falls.	
Austin	Clackamas	12,884	August 9	98%	Burning in the Mt. Hood National Forest.	
Picture Rock	Lake County	1,228	August 16	August 29	North of Summer Lake.	

== See also ==
- 2026 California wildfires
- 2026 United States wildfires
- Wildfires in 2026
