= Chris Beck =

Chris Beck may refer to:

- Chris Beck (baseball) (born 1990), American baseball player
- Christophe Beck (born 1968), Canadian film and television composer
- Chris Beck (Navy SEAL) (born 1966), retired US Navy SEAL who came out as a trans woman and then detransitioned
- Chris Beck (politician) (born 1963), American politician and former member of the Oregon House of Representatives
- Chris Beck, a character in The Martian (Weir novel)
