= 2026 Salem, Oregon mayoral election =

- May 19, 2026

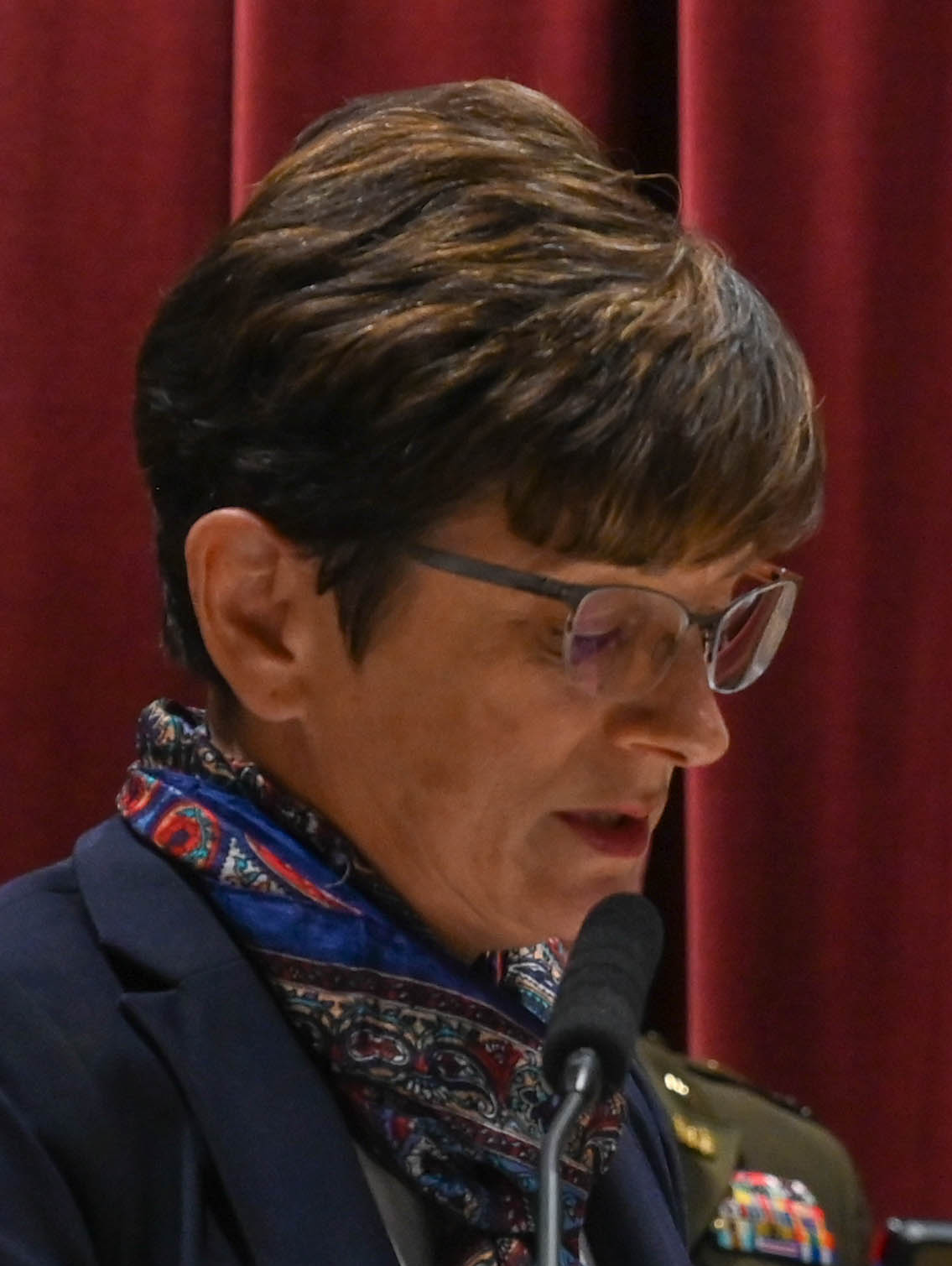
Candidate	Vanessa Nordyke	Julie Hoy
Popular vote	23,768	18,396
Percentage	56.10%	43.42%
Mayor before election
Julie Hoy
Elected mayor
Vanessa Nordyke

The 2026 Salem, Oregon mayoral election was decided by the primary election, which took place on May 19, 2026. Incumbent mayor Julie Hoy ran for re-election, but was defeated by city councilor Vanessa Nordyke.

== Background ==
The mayor of Salem serves a two-year, voluntary (unpaid) term. It is non-partisan position. The mayor is the de facto leader of the city council, although they only have one vote on council decisions, just like the other council members.

The primary election was held on May 19, 2026, at the same time as statewide primary elections, including elections for Salem City Council Wards 2, 4, 6, and 8. If a candidate wins more than 50% of the vote in the primary election, that candidate wins the election entirely; otherwise, a second election is held during the general elections in November.

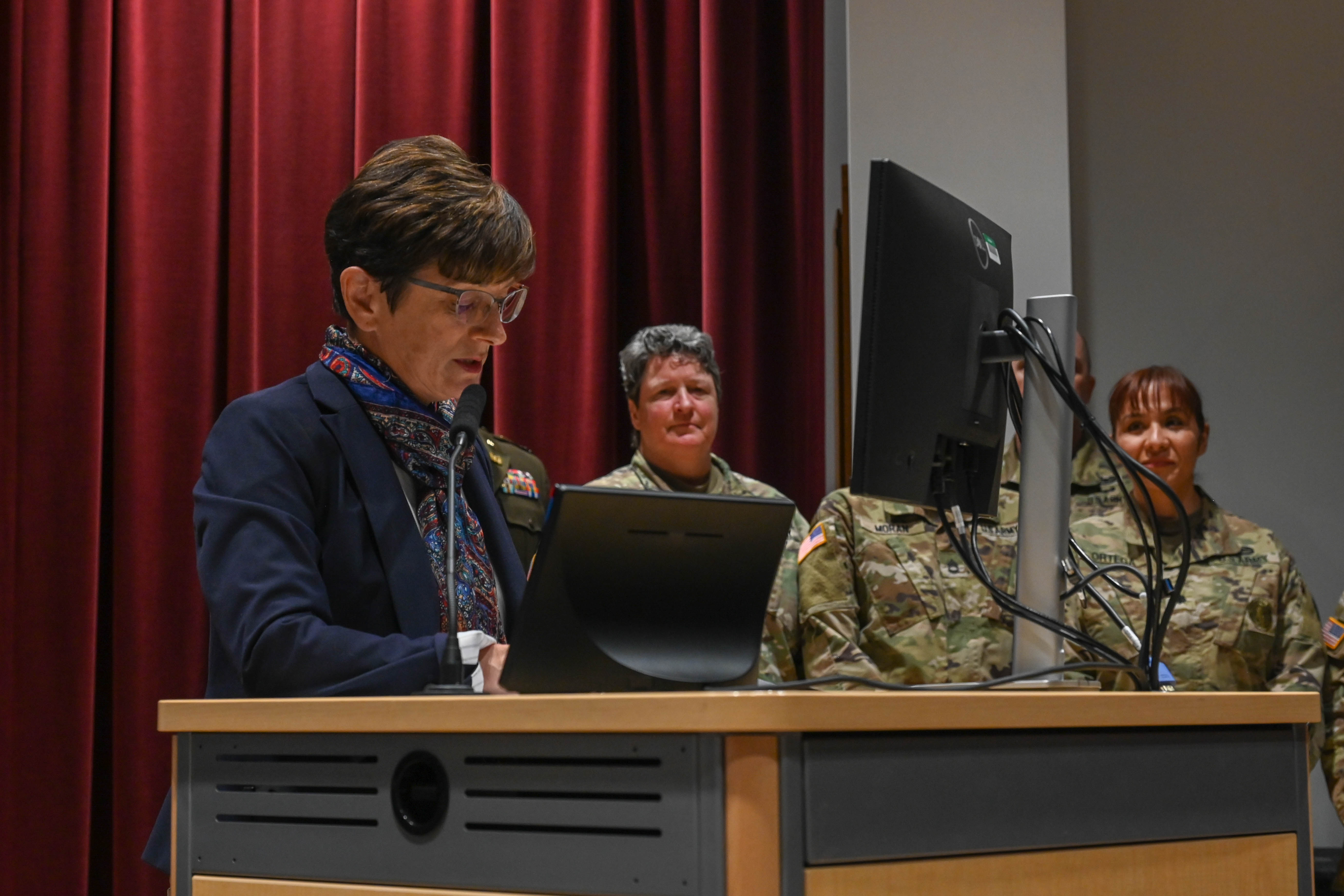
Julie Hoy (left) speaks at an Oregon Army National Guard event, June 2025

Incumbent Mayor Julie Hoy, who took office in 2025, ran for re-election. Hoy is co-owner of Geppetto's Italian Restaurant. She is also a Catholic singer, musician, and songwriter who has produced music for Oregon Catholic Press (OCP). She studied at the Phil Mattson School of Music in Spokane, Washington, and at Shoreline Community College. She was city councilor starting in May 2022, then in 2024 she ran against then-mayor Chris Hoy and won, becoming mayor in early 2025.

Vanessa Nordyke, city councilor for Ward 7 in South Salem since 2019, announced in September 2025 that she would run against Hoy. Nordyke is a lawyer and has served as the executive director of CASA of Marion County since 2023. She graduated from Georgetown University School of Foreign Service and University of Oregon School of Law. She was assistant attorney general with the Oregon Department of Justice for 15 years, and became the youngest elected president of the Oregon State Bar in 2018.

== Campaign ==
Salem Reporter noted the race was "dominated by attack ads and partisan politics despite the mayor’s role being a nonpartisan volunteer position."

Hoy's campaign positioned her as a conservative with a focus on balancing the city's budget. Her campaign promises included no new taxes without voter approval, safer neighborhoods, more homeless services, and cleaner public spaces. She was endorsed by the Salem Area Chamber of Commerce, the Salem Police Employees Union, the Salem Professional Firefighters union, Taxpayers Association of Oregon, Mid Valley Association of REALTORS, Oregon Hispanic Business Association, former Salem mayor Chuck Bennett, and Polk County Commissioners Lyle Mordhorst and Craig Pope.

Nordyke was described as a progressive candidate, and she said she agreed with many progressive policies. Her campaign promised she would push for affordable housing, funding for youth services and the Salem Public Library, expanding mental health services, and opening a sobering center. Her supporters included AFSCME Councils 67 and 75, PCUN, SEIU 503, the Oregon League of Conservation Voters, North Coast States Carpenters Union, Salem Progressive (of which former mayor Chris Hoy is the chairperson), Polk County Democrats, Deb Patterson, and Paul Evans.

Hoy raised over $210,000 for her campaign, with a third of the funds donated by real estate companies and political action committees like Marion Polk First Political Action Committee.

Nordyke raised $77,410, with most (85%) of the funds coming from individual donors. Some of her larger donations came from AFSCME Councils 67 and 75.

== Results ==
Nordyke won the primary election; Hoy conceded the race on May 20. Nordyke will be inaugurated in January 2027.

More than 34,000 people voted in the mayoral election, breaking the city's record for the most votes in a primary mayoral election.

== See also ==
- 2026 in Oregon
- 2026 Portland, Oregon City Council election
- List of mayors of places in Oregon
