= 2026 Oregon elections =

- November 3, 2026
- Turnout: 63.80% (as of 12:15 pm PST 10/13)

A general election was held in the U.S. state of Oregon on November 3, 2026. Primary elections were held on May 19, 2026.

== Federal ==
=== United States House of Representatives ===
All six of Oregon's seats in the United States House of Representatives are up for election in 2026. These seats are represented by five Democrats and one Republican prior to the election. All six incumbents won their reelection campaigns.

=== Senate ===
Democrat Jeff Merkley, the incumbent, won a fourth term against Republican David Brock Smith.

== State offices ==
=== Governor ===
Democrat Tina Kotek, the incumbent, won a second term against Republican Christine Drazan.

=== Labor Commissioner ===
First-term incumbent Christina Stephenson (non-partisan, Democratic-aligned) won a second consecutive term against challenger Chris Lynch.

=== Legislature ===
All 60 seats in the Oregon House of Representatives and 15 of 30 seats in the Oregon State Senate are up for election.

== Local elections ==
=== Portland ===
The 2026 Portland City Council elections will be the second election under the new city council form of government adopted following Portland's 2022 charter reform, and the second to use ranked-choice voting. Half of the city council is up for election: the three seats for district 3 and the three seats for district 4.

=== Salem ===
In the May 19 election for Salem mayor, Salem city councilor Vanessa Nordyke defeated incumbent Julie Hoy.

== Ballot measures ==
There was one statewide Oregon ballot measure in the May primary election.

=== Measure 120 ===
Ballot Measure 120
- May 19, 2026
- Increases fuel taxes, registration/title fees for roads, tax on wages for public transportation services

Results
Choice	Votes	%
Yes	207,066	16.98%
No	1,012,663	83.02%
County results
No
90–100%
80–90%
70–80%

Oregon Ballot Measure 120 was a failed referendum. If approved, the state would have raised the fuel tax by six cents to 46 cents per gallon, vehicle registration fees by $42, and title fees for passenger vehicles by $139; the state payroll tax for public transportation services would also have increased from 0.1% to 0.2% until January 1, 2028. The increased revenue would be used for public transportation and the State Highway Fund.

Because of the increased adoption of fuel-efficient vehicles and inflation raising infrastructure costs, the state saw a shortage in funds for transportation. In the 2025 session, the Oregon Legislative Assembly failed to find funding. Governor Tina Kotek called a special legislative session to pass a $4.3 billion transportation package. In response, a campaign was launched to petition for a portion of the law to be placed on the ballot as a referendum. Over 200,000 signatures were submitted to the Oregon Secretary of State, enough to place the referendum on the ballot.

The measure was originally scheduled for the general election in November, but was moved to the May primary election when the assembly passed Senate Bill 1599 in the 2026 legislative session. Republican lawmakers staged walkouts in protest, and four unsuccessful lawsuits were filed to prevent moving the referendum date.

As of April 1, 2026, the Right to Vote on the Gas Tax PAC had reported over $243,000 in contributions and $198,000 in expenses to support a "no" vote. There were no PACs that campaigned in support of the measure.

The measure failed to pass, with more than 80% of votes being cast against it.

==== Results ====
Oregon Measure 120
Choice	Votes	%
For	207,066	16.98
Against	1,012,663	83.02
Total	1,219,729	100.00
Source: Secretary of State of Oregon

== See also ==
- 2026 in Oregon
