= 2026 United States House of Representatives elections in Oregon =

- November 3, 2026

All 6 Oregon seats to the United States House of Representatives
	Majority party	Minority party
Party	Democratic	Republican
Last election	5	1
Seats won	5	1
Seat change	Steady	Steady
Popular vote	1,099,604	757,204
Percentage	58.54%	40.31%
Swing	▲5.16%	▼1.99%

Democratic
50–60%
60–70%
70–80%
Republican
50–60%
60–70%
70–80%

The 2026 United States House of Representatives elections in Oregon were held on November 3, 2026, to elect the six U.S. representatives from the state of Oregon, one from each of the state's congressional districts. The elections coincided with other elections to the House of Representatives, elections to the United States Senate, and various state and local elections. The primary elections took place on May 19, 2026.

== District 1 ==
2026 Oregon's 1st congressional district election
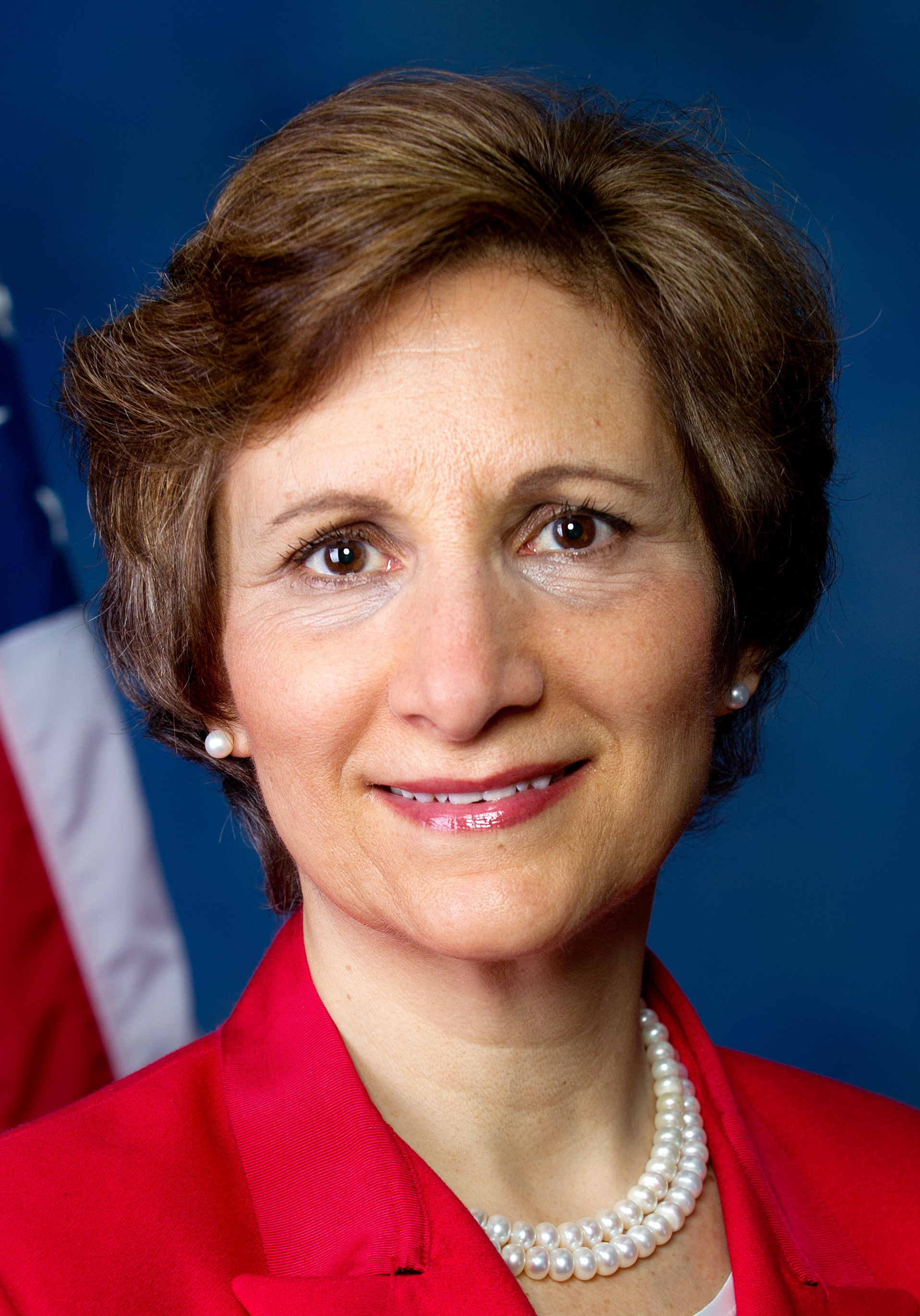

Nominee	Suzanne Bonamici	Barbara Kahl
Party	Democratic	Republican
- County results Bonamici: 50–60% 60–70% 80–90% Kahl: 50–60%
Incumbent U.S. Representative
Suzanne Bonamici
Democratic

The 1st district is located in northwestern Oregon and includes the western Portland metropolitan area, including the Portland suburbs of Beaverton and Hillsboro, parts of Portland west of the Willamette River, and Tillamook County. The incumbent is Democrat Suzanne Bonamici, who was re-elected with 68.6% of the vote in 2024.

=== Democratic primary ===
==== Nominee ====
- Suzanne Bonamici, incumbent U.S. representative

==== Eliminated in primary ====
- Jamil Ahmad, mechanical engineer

==== Endorsements ====
Suzanne Bonamici

Labor unions

- Oregon AFL-CIO

Organizations

- Center for Freethought Equality
- J Street
- Jewish Democratic Council of America
- League of Conservation Voters
- Planned Parenthood Action Fund

Newspapers

- Willamette Week

==== Fundraising ====
Campaign finance reports as of March 31, 2026
Candidate	Raised	Spent	Cash on hand
Suzanne Bonamici (D)	$597,348	$615,983	$527,329
Jamil Ahmadi (D)	$5,376 (Note: Includes $5,000 that was self-funded by Ahmadi.)	$510	$5,473
Source: Federal Election Commission

==== Results ====
Democratic primary results
Party	Candidate	Votes	%
Democratic	Suzanne Bonamici (incumbent)	77,306	86.6
Democratic	Jamil Ahmad	11,458	12.8
Write-in		497	0.6
Total votes		89,261	100.0

=== Republican primary ===
==== Nominee ====
- Barbara Kahl, veterinarian

==== Eliminated in primary ====
- John Verbeek, retired banker

==== Endorsements ====
Barbara Kahl

Organizations

- Log Cabin Republicans

==== Results ====
Republican primary results
Party	Candidate	Votes	%
Republican	Barbara Kahl	26,877	71.5
Republican	John Verbeek	10,285	27.4
Write-in		437	1.2
Total votes		37,599	100.0

=== General election ===
==== Predictions ====
Source	Ranking	As of
Decision Desk HQ	Safe D	July 14, 2026
The Cook Political Report	Solid D	February 6, 2025
Inside Elections	Solid D	March 7, 2025
Sabato's Crystal Ball	Safe D	September 18, 2025

==== Fundraising ====
Campaign finance reports as of May 25, 2026
Candidate	Raised	Spent	Cash on hand
Suzanne Bonamici (D)	$640,072	$640,488	$545,548
Barbara Kahl (R)	$1,191	$491	$1,350
Source: Federal Election Commission

==== Results ====
2026 Oregon's 1st congressional district election
Party	Candidate	Votes	%	±%
Democratic	Suzanne Bonamici (incumbent)			
Republican	Barbara Kahl			
Total votes				

== District 2 ==
2026 Oregon's 2nd congressional district election
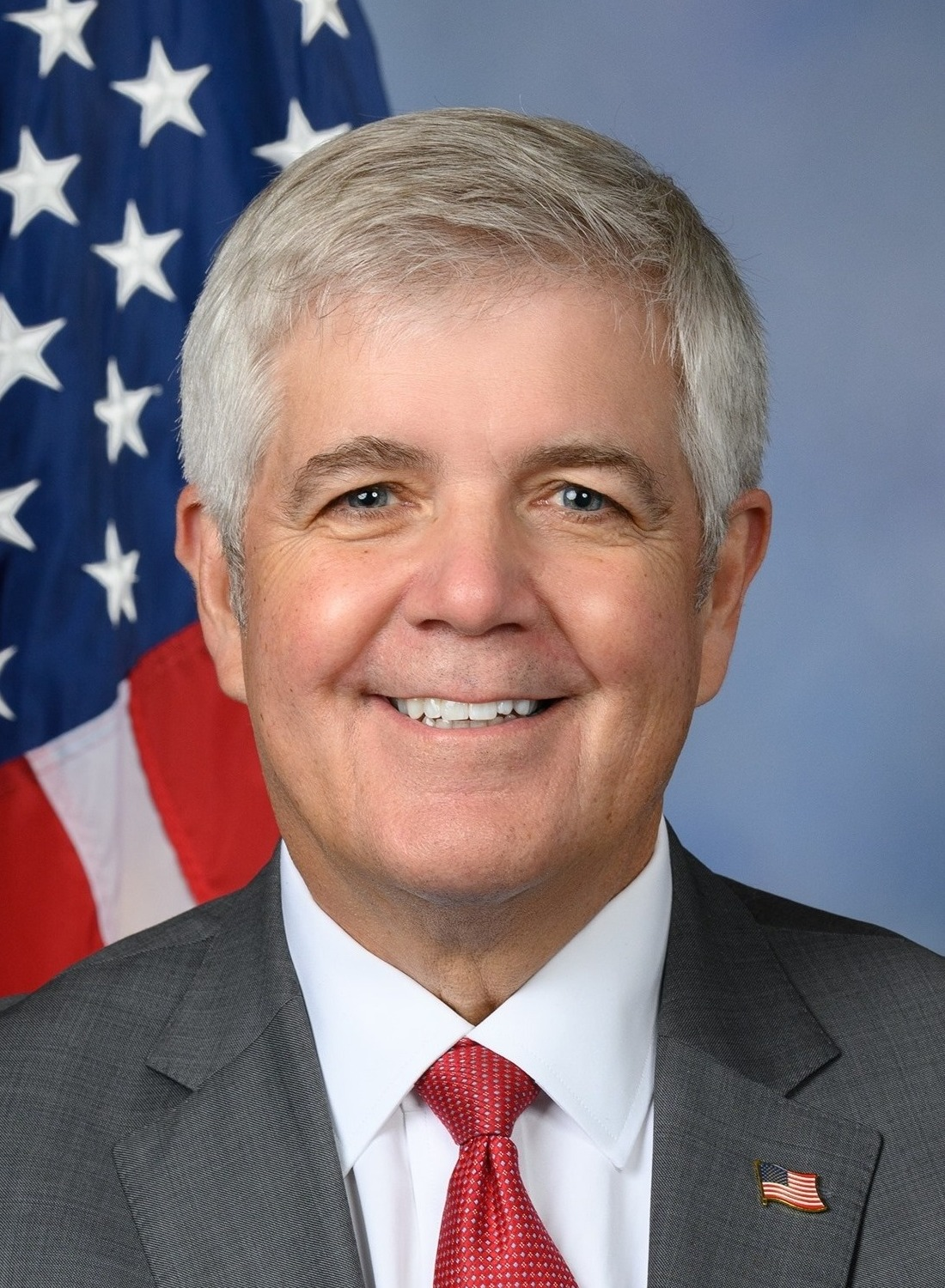

Nominee	Cliff Bentz	Chris Beck
Party	Republican	Democratic
- County results Bentz: 50–60% 60–70% 70–80% 80–90%
Incumbent U.S. Representative
Cliff Bentz
Republican

The 2nd district encompasses most of Eastern Oregon and a portion of southern Oregon. The incumbent is Republican Cliff Bentz, who was re-elected with 63.9% of the vote in 2024.

=== Republican primary ===
==== Nominee ====
- Cliff Bentz, incumbent U.S. representative

==== Eliminated in primary ====
- Andrea Carr, personal support worker
- Peter Larson, admissions counselor

==== Endorsements ====
Cliff Bentz

Executive branch officials

- Donald Trump, 45th and 47th president of the United States (2017–2021, 2025–present)
Andrea Carr

Labor unions

- Oregon AFL-CIO

Political parties

- Oregon Working Families Party

==== Fundraising ====
Campaign finance reports as of March 31, 2026
Candidate	Raised	Spent	Cash on hand
Cliff Bentz (R)	$764,671	$420,541	$1,400,474
Peter Larson (R)	$7,034	$7,034	$0
Source: Federal Election Commission

==== Results ====
Republican primary results
Party	Candidate	Votes	%
Republican	Cliff Bentz (incumbent)	79,543	79.6
Republican	Peter Larson	14,565	14.6
Republican	Andrea Carr	5,353	5.4
Write-in		474	0.5
Total votes		99,935	100.0

=== Democratic primary ===
==== Nominee ====
- Chris Beck, former state representative from the 12th district (1997–2003)

==== Eliminated in primary ====
- Mary Doyle, teacher
- Rebecca Mueller, pediatrician
- Peter Quince, writer
- Dawn Rasmussen, former North Wasco School Board member
- Patty Snow, business manager

=== Endorsements ===
Dawn Rasmussen

Political parties

- Oregon Working Families Party

==== Fundraising ====
Campaign finance reports as of March 31, 2026
Candidate	Raised	Spent	Cash on hand
Chris Beck (D)	$23,391	$3,265	$20,125
Mary Doyle (D)	$3,614	$1,981	$1,632
Rebecca Mueller (D)	$15,784	$4,953	$10,831
Dawn Rasmussen (D)	$55,117	$49,356	$5,761
Patty Snow (D)	$25,383	$16,207	$9,175
Source: Federal Election Commission

==== Results ====
Democratic primary results
Party	Candidate	Votes	%
Democratic	Chris Beck	15,951	34.4
Democratic	Mary Doyle	9,101	19.6
Democratic	Rebecca Mueller	8,357	18.0
Democratic	Dawn Rasmussen	6,880	14.8
Democratic	Patty Snow	4,224	9.1
Democratic	Peter Quince	1,258	2.7
Write-in		610	1.3
Total votes		46,381	100.0

=== General election ===
==== Predictions ====
Source	Ranking	As of
Decision Desk HQ	Safe R	July 14, 2026
The Cook Political Report	Solid R	February 6, 2025
Inside Elections	Solid R	March 7, 2025
Sabato's Crystal Ball	Safe R	September 18, 2025

==== Fundraising ====
Campaign finance reports as of May 25, 2026
Candidate	Raised	Spent	Cash on hand
Cliff Bentz (R)	$803,224	$469,467	$1,390,101
Chris Beck (D)	$30,426	$21,486	$8,940
Source: Federal Election Commission

==== Results ====
2026 Oregon's 2nd congressional district election
Party	Candidate	Votes	%	±%
Republican	Cliff Bentz (incumbent)			
Democratic	Chris Beck			
Total votes				

== District 3 ==
2026 Oregon's 3rd congressional district election
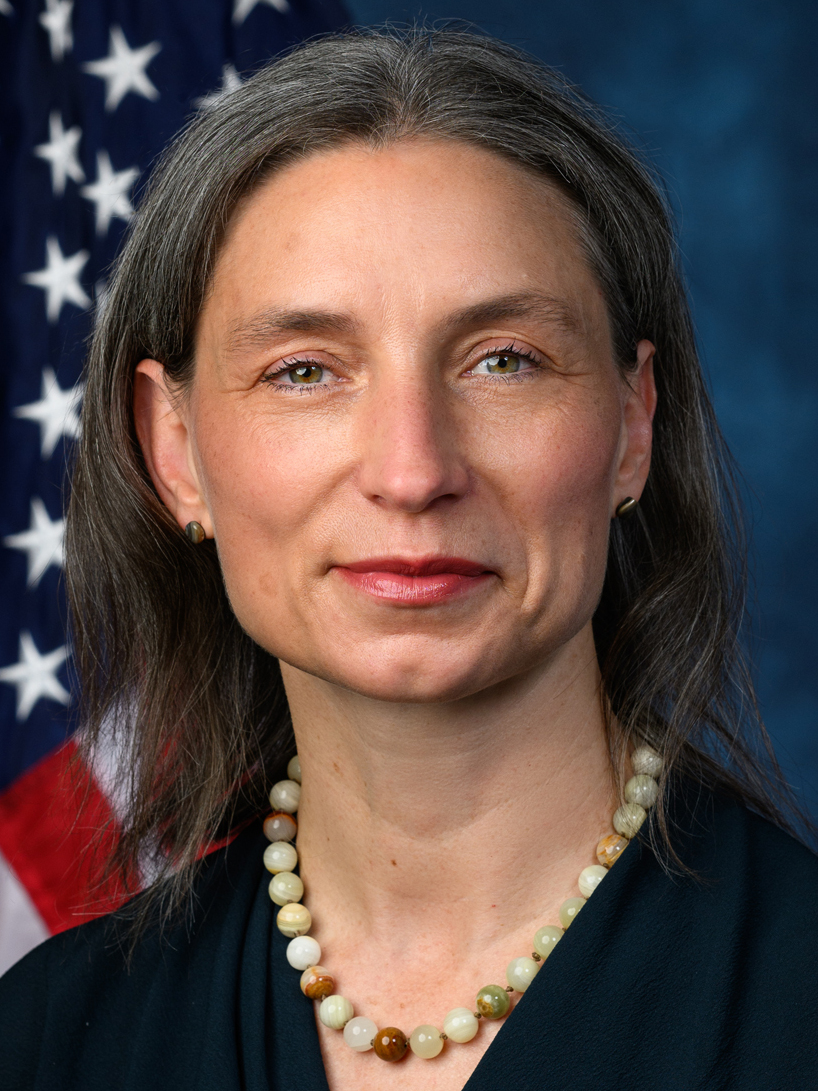

Nominee	Maxine Dexter	Loran Ayles
Party	Democratic	Republican
- County results Dexter: 70–80% 80–90% Ayles: 50–60%
Incumbent U.S. Representative
Maxine Dexter
Democratic

This district contains the eastern Portland metro area, covering Portland and Gresham, as well as northeastern Clackamas County and Hood River County. The incumbent is Democrat Maxine Dexter, who was elected with 67.7% of the vote in 2024.

=== Democratic primary ===
==== Nominee ====
- Maxine Dexter, incumbent U.S. representative

==== Eliminated in primary ====
- Andrew Castilleja, personal image consultant
- Jessica Salas, activist

==== Endorsements ====
Maxine Dexter

Labor unions

- Oregon AFL-CIO

Organizations

- 314 Action
- Jewish Democratic Council of America
- League of Conservation Voters Action Fund
- National Women's Political Caucus
- Planned Parenthood Action Fund
- Reproductive Freedom for All
- Vote Mama
Jessica Salas

Organizations

- Track AIPAC

==== Fundraising ====
Campaign finance reports as of March 31, 2026
Candidate	Raised	Spent	Cash on hand
Maxine Dexter (D)	$847,662	$696,860	$173,288
Jessica Salas (D) (Note: Includes $5,274 that was self-funded by Salas.)	$11,680	$11,360	$320
Source: Federal Election Commission

==== Results ====
Democratic primary results
Party	Candidate	Votes	%
Democratic	Maxine Dexter (incumbent)	81,643	89.1
Democratic	Jessica Salas	7,513	8.2
Democratic	Andrew Castilleja	2,082	2.3
Write-in		352	0.4
Total votes		91,590	100.0

=== Republican primary ===
==== Nominee ====
- Loran Ayles, heavy equipment operator

==== Results ====
Republican primary results
Party	Candidate	Votes	%
Republican	Loran Ayles	14,420	96.3
Write-in		557	3.7
Total votes		14,977	100.0

=== General election ===
==== Predictions ====
Source	Ranking	As of
Decision Desk HQ	Safe D	July 14, 2026
The Cook Political Report	Solid D	February 6, 2025
Inside Elections	Solid D	March 7, 2025
Sabato's Crystal Ball	Safe D	September 18, 2025

==== Fundraising ====
Campaign finance reports as of May 25, 2026
Candidate	Raised	Spent	Cash on hand
Maxine Dexter (D)	$908,658	$750,311	$180,834
Loran Ayles (R)	$0	$0	$0
Source: Federal Election Commission

==== Results ====
2026 Oregon's 3rd congressional district election
Party	Candidate	Votes	%	±%
Democratic	Maxine Dexter (incumbent)			
Republican	Loran Ayles			
Total votes				

== District 4 ==
2026 Oregon's 4th congressional district election
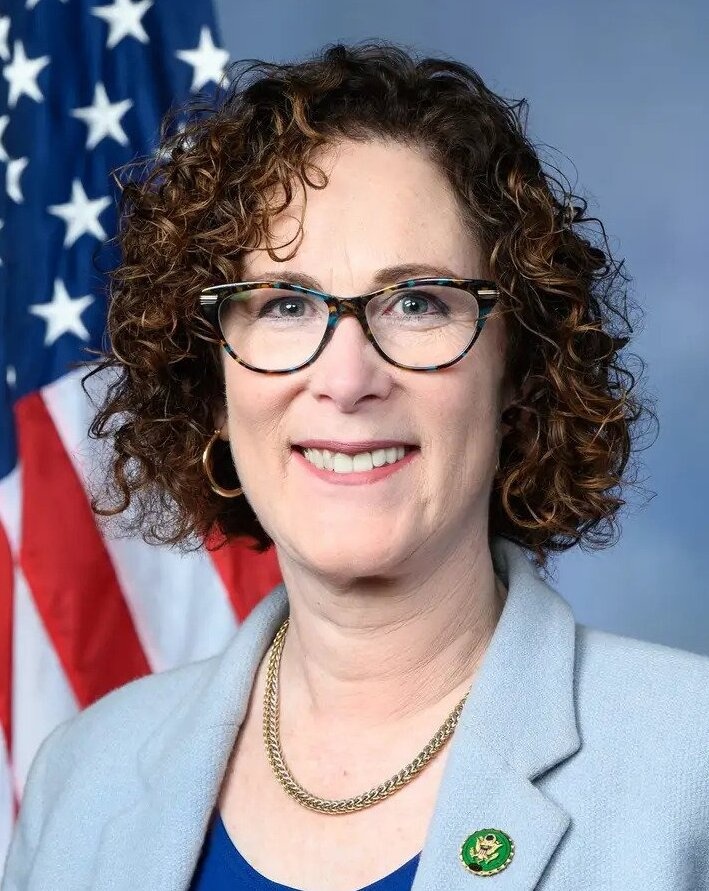

Nominee	Val Hoyle	Monique DeSpain
Party	Democratic	Republican
Popular vote	179,514	143,176
Percentage	53.7%	42.8%
- County results Hoyle: 50–60% 60–70% DeSpain: 50–60% 60–70%
U.S. Representative before election
Val Hoyle
Democratic
Elected U.S. Representative
Val Hoyle
Democratic

The 4th district includes the southern Willamette Valley and parts of the South and Central Coasts, including Eugene, Corvallis, and Roseburg. The incumbent is Democrat Val Hoyle, who was re-elected with 51.7% of the vote in 2024.

=== Democratic primary ===
==== Nominee ====
- Val Hoyle, incumbent U.S. representative

==== Eliminated in primary ====
- Daniel Bahlen, Apache tribal health official
- Melissa Bird, social worker

==== Withdrawn ====
- Melvin Smith, retired truck driver
- Bo Wiedenfeld-Needham, business owner

==== Endorsements ====
Melissa Bird

Organizations

- Progressive Democrats of America
- Progressive Victory
- Track AIPAC

Political parties

- Oregon Working Families Party
Val Hoyle

U.S. Senators

- Bernie Sanders, Vermont (2007–present) (Independent)

Labor unions

- American Federation of Government Employees
- Oregon AFL-CIO
- Oregon and Southern Idaho District Council of Laborers/LiUNA
- Oregon Nurses Association
- United Food and Commercial Workers 555

Organizations

- Christopher Street Project
- Congressional Hispanic Caucus BOLD PAC
- Giffords PAC
- J Street
- Jewish Democratic Council of America
- League of Conservation Voters Action Fund
- Planned Parenthood Action Fund

Political parties

- Working Families Party

==== Fundraising ====
Italics indicate a withdrawn candidate.

Campaign finance reports as of March 31, 2026
Candidate	Raised	Spent	Cash on hand
Melissa Bird (D)	$54,309	$51,764	$2,541
Val Hoyle (D)	$999,706	$586,589	$502,507
Bo Wiedenfeld-Needham (D)	$3,582	$2,6957	$624
Source: Federal Election Commission

==== Results ====
Democratic primary results
Party	Candidate	Votes	%
Democratic	Val Hoyle (incumbent)	68,900	75.2
Democratic	Melissa Bird	19,850	21.7
Democratic	Daniel Bahlen	2,259	2.5
Write-in		676	0.7
Total votes		91,685	100.0

=== Republican primary ===
==== Nominee ====
- Monique DeSpain, attorney and nominee for this district in 2024

==== Eliminated in primary ====
- Stefan Strek, student

==== Endorsements ====
Monique DeSpain

Organizations

- Log Cabin Republicans

==== Fundraising ====
Campaign finance reports as of March 31, 2026
Candidate	Raised	Spent	Cash on hand
Monique DeSpain (R)	$467,374	$146,278	$31,095
Source: Federal Election Commission

==== Results ====
Republican primary results
Party	Candidate	Votes	%
Republican	Monique DeSpain	59,232	86.6
Republican	Stefan Strek	8,507	12.4
Write-in		696	1.0
Total votes		68,435	100.0

=== General election ===
==== Post-primary endorsements ====
Val Hoyle (D)

Organizations

- National Women's Political Caucus
Monique DeSpain (R)

Organizations

- National Federation of Independent Business Fed PAC

==== Predictions ====
Source	Ranking	As of
Decision Desk HQ	Safe D	July 14, 2026
The Cook Political Report	Solid D	February 6, 2025
Inside Elections	Solid D	March 7, 2025
Sabato's Crystal Ball	Safe D	March 26, 2026

==== Fundraising ====
Campaign finance reports as of October 14, 2026
Candidate	Raised	Spent	Cash on hand
Val Hoyle (D)	$1,652,428	$1,555,163	$186,656
Monique DeSpain (R)	$921,876	$768,300	$153,576
Justin Filip (PG)	$4,636	$4,248	$3,616
Source: Federal Election Commission

==== Results ====
2026 Oregon's 4th congressional district election
Party	Candidate	Votes	%	±%
Democratic	Val Hoyle (incumbent)			
Republican	Monique DeSpain			
Pacific Green	Justin Filip			
Total votes				

== District 5 ==
2026 Oregon's 5th congressional district election
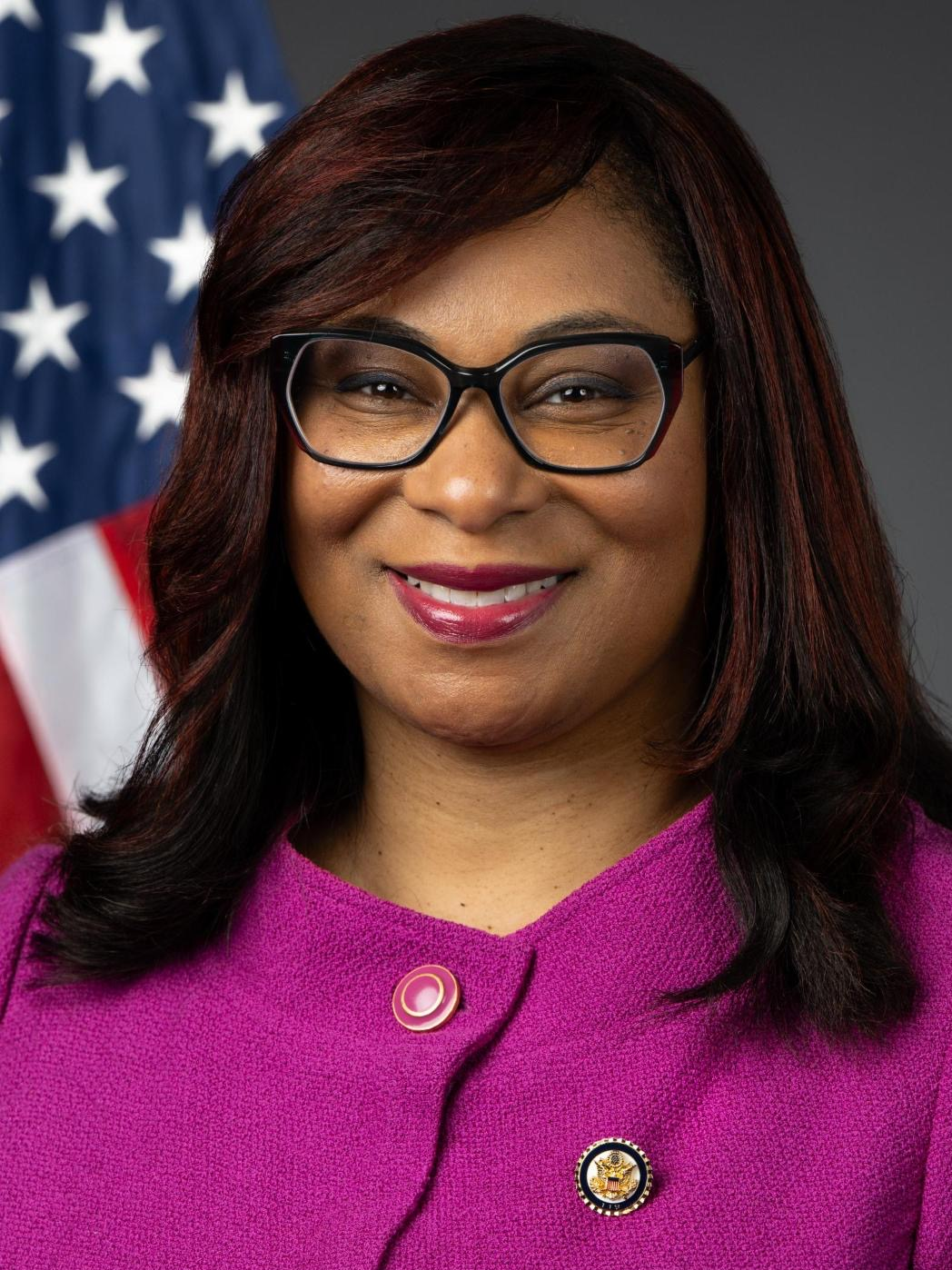

Nominee	Janelle Bynum	Patti Adair
Party	Democratic	Republican
Popular vote	190,023	153,946
Percentage	54.0%	43.7%
- County results Bynum: 50–60% 80–90% Adair: 50–60% 60–70%
U.S. Representative before election
Janelle Bynum
Democratic
Elected U.S. Representative
Janelle Bynum
Democratic

The 5th district includes portions of the Portland suburbs, also stretching southwards through the eastern parts of Marion and Linn counties to Bend. The incumbent is Democrat Janelle Bynum, who flipped the district and was elected with 47.7% of the vote in 2024.

=== Democratic primary ===
==== Nominee ====
- Janelle Bynum, incumbent U.S. representative

==== Eliminated in primary ====
- Zeva Rosenbaum, marketing coordinator

==== Endorsements ====
Janelle Bynum

Organizations

- 314 Action
- Congressional Hispanic Caucus BOLD PAC
- Elect Democratic Women
- EMILY's List
- End Citizens United
- Giffords
- Jewish Democratic Council of America
- Joint Action Committee for Political Affairs
- League of Conservation Voters Action Fund
- Planned Parenthood Action Fund
- Reproductive Freedom for All
- Vote Mama

Newspapers

- Willamette Week (primary only)
Zeva Rosenbaum

Organizations

- Track AIPAC

==== Fundraising ====
Campaign finance reports as of March 31, 2026
Candidate	Raised	Spent	Cash on hand
Janelle Bynum (D)	$3,036,463	$795,801	$2,285,795
Source: Federal Election Commission

==== Results ====
Democratic primary results
Party	Candidate	Votes	%
Democratic	Janelle Bynum (incumbent)	70,294	82.0
Democratic	Zeva Rosenbaum	14,951	17.4
Write-in		468	0.6
Total votes		85,713	100.0

=== Republican primary ===
==== Nominee ====
- Patti Adair, Deschutes County commissioner

==== Eliminated in primary ====
- Jonathan Lockwood, political communications consultant

==== Endorsements ====
Patti Adair

Newspapers

- Willamette Week (primary only)

==== Fundraising ====
Campaign finance reports as of March 31, 2026
Candidate	Raised	Spent	Cash on hand
Patti Adair (R)	$277,039	$88,009	$189,030
Source: Federal Election Commission

==== Results ====
Republican primary results
Party	Candidate	Votes	%
Republican	Patti Adair	43,524	59.6
Republican	Jonathan Lockwood	28,984	39.7
Write-in		504	0.7
Total votes		73,012	100.0

=== General election ===
==== Predictions ====
Source	Ranking	As of
Decision Desk HQ	Safe D	July 14, 2026
The Cook Political Report	Solid D	July 16, 2026
Inside Elections	Solid D	December 5, 2025
Sabato's Crystal Ball	Safe D	October 27, 2026

==== Fundraising ====
Campaign finance reports as of October 14, 2026
Candidate	Raised	Spent	Cash on hand
Janelle Bynum (D)	$4,737,332	$2,606,483	$2,175,981
Patti Adair (R)	$682,239	$559,654	$122,585
Source: Federal Election Commission

==== Results ====
2026 Oregon's 5th congressional district election
Party	Candidate	Votes	%	±%
Democratic	Janelle Bynum (incumbent)			
Republican	Patti Adair			
Pacific Green	Andrea Townsend			
Total votes				

== District 6 ==
2026 Oregon's 6th congressional district election
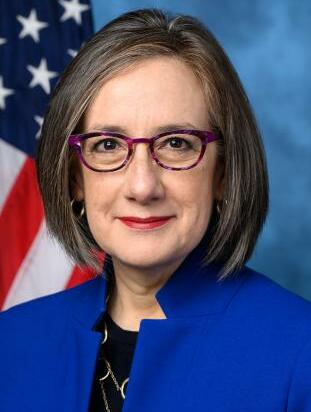

Nominee	Andrea Salinas	David Russ
Party	Democratic	Republican
- County results Salinas: 50–60% 60–70% Russ: 50–60%
Incumbent U.S. Representative
Andrea Salinas
Democratic

The 6th district consists of Polk County and Yamhill County, in addition to portions of Marion County (including the state capital, Salem), Clackamas County, and Washington County. The incumbent is Democrat Andrea Salinas, who was re-elected with 53.3% of the vote in 2024.

=== Democratic primary ===
==== Nominee ====
- Andrea Salinas, incumbent U.S. representative

==== Endorsements ====
Andrea Salinas

Labor unions

- Oregon AFL-CIO

Organizations

- Center for Freethought Equality
- Democratic Majority for Israel
- J Street
- Jewish Democratic Council of America
- Joint Action Committee for Political Affairs
- League of Conservation Voters Action Fund
- National Women's Political Caucus
- Planned Parenthood Action Fund
- Reproductive Freedom for All

Political parties

- Marion County Democratic Party

==== Fundraising ====
Campaign finance reports as of March 31, 2026
Candidate	Raised	Spent	Cash on hand
Andrea Salinas (D)	$1,285,426	$768,631	$578,268
Source: Federal Election Commission

==== Results ====
Democratic primary results
Party	Candidate	Votes	%
Democratic	Andrea Salinas (incumbent)	62,532	98.7
Write-in		797	1.3
Total votes		63,329	100.0

=== Republican primary ===
==== Nominee ====
- David Russ, former mayor of Dundee and candidate for this district in 2022 and 2024

==== Fundraising ====
Campaign finance reports as of March 31, 2026
Candidate	Raised	Spent	Cash on hand
David Russ (R)	$0	$14,123	$146
Source: Federal Election Commission

==== Results ====
Republican primary results
Party	Candidate	Votes	%
Republican	David Russ	44,027	98.4
Write-in		731	1.7
Total votes		44,758	100.0

=== General election ===
==== Predictions ====
Source	Ranking	As of
Decision Desk HQ	Safe D	July 14, 2026
The Cook Political Report	Solid D	February 6, 2025
Inside Elections	Solid D	March 7, 2025
Sabato's Crystal Ball	Safe D	March 26, 2026

==== Post-primary endorsements ====
Andrea Salinas (D)

Labor unions

- United Auto Workers

==== Fundraising ====
Campaign finance reports as of May 25, 2026
Candidate	Raised	Spent	Cash on hand
Andrew Salinas (D)	$1,359,544	$831,874	$589,145
David Russ (R)	$5,025	$14,124	$5,171
Source: Federal Election Commission

==== Results ====
2026 Oregon's 6th congressional district election
Party	Candidate	Votes	%	±%
Democratic	Andrea Salinas (incumbent)			
Republican	David Russ			
Total votes				
