= Clackamette Park =

Public park in Oregon City, Oregon, U.S.

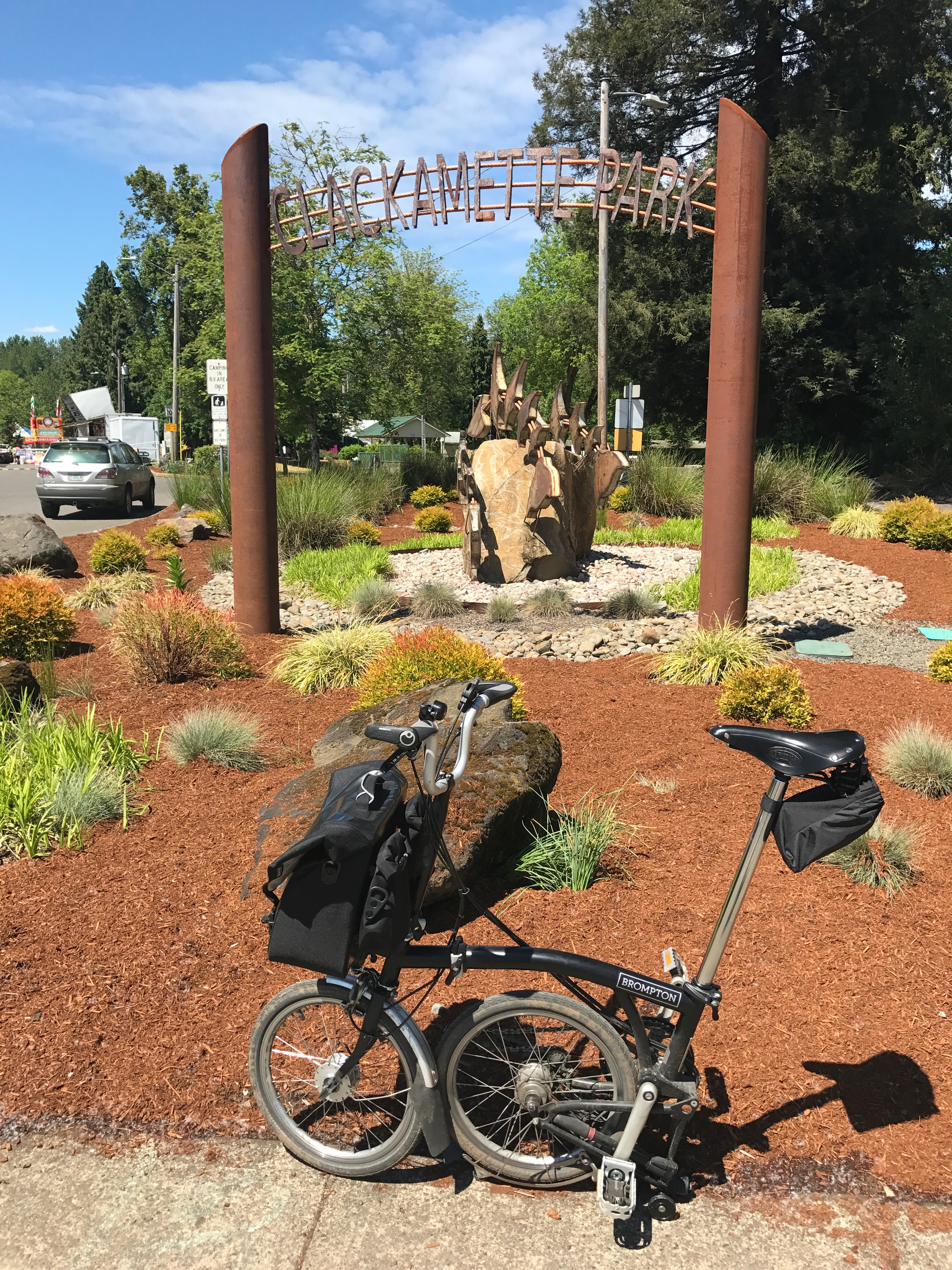
- Park sign, 2017

- Location within Oregon
- Location: Oregon City, Oregon, U.S.
- Coordinates: 45°22′16″N 122°36′12″W

Clackamette Park is a public park in Oregon City, in the U.S. state of Oregon. The park has a boat ramp, and served as a film location for Grimm.
