= Little Yamsay Fire =

2024 wildfire in Oregon, USA

- Part of the 2024 Oregon wildfires
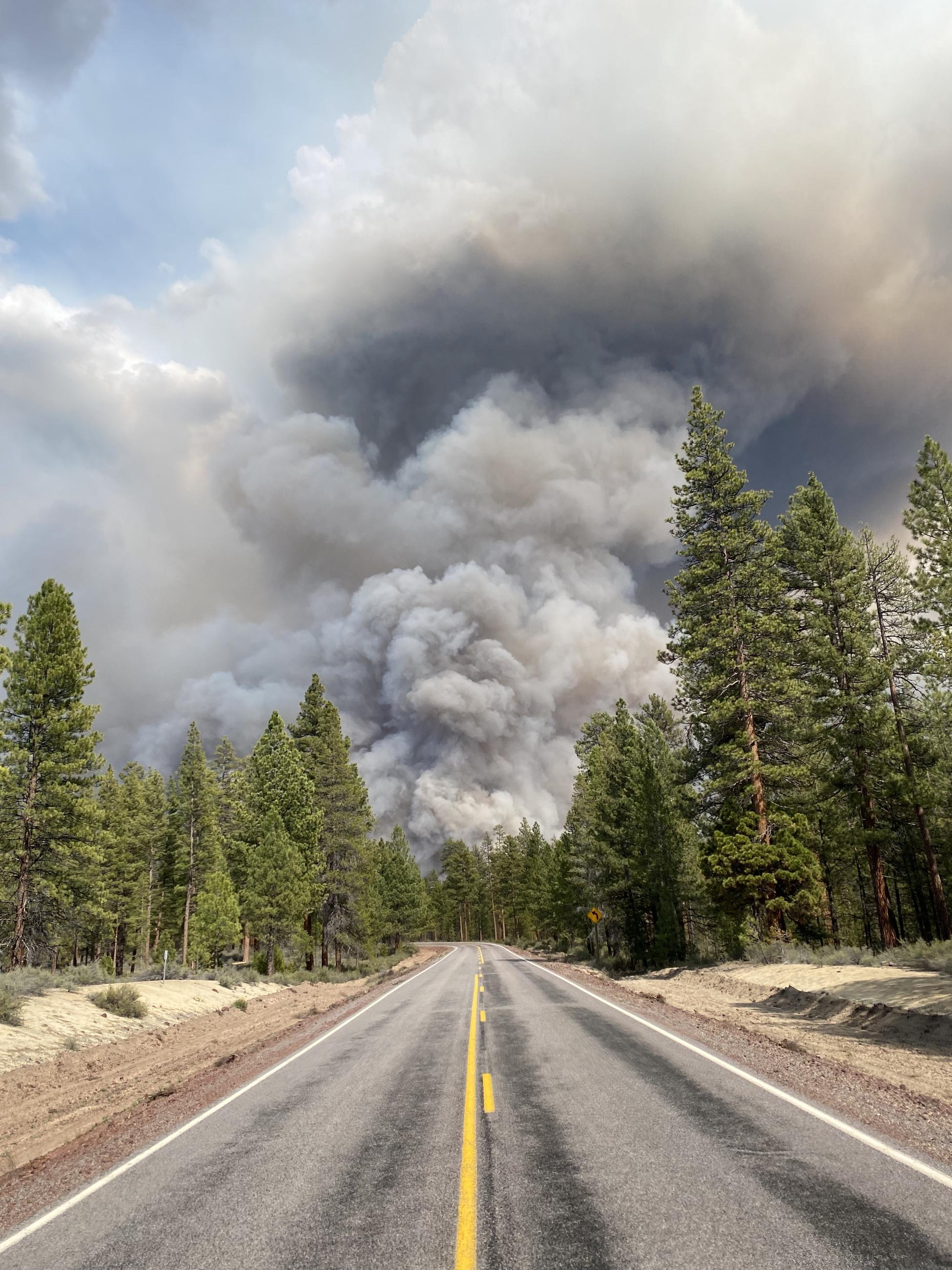
- Smoke column from the fire as seen on Silver Lake Road
- Date: April 20, 2024 –; May 13, 2024

Statistics
- Perimeter: 100% contained
- Burned area: 6,340 acres (2,566 ha; 10 sq mi; 26 km^{2})

Impacts
- Deaths: 0
- Injuries: 0
- Cost: $5.3 million (2024 USD)

Ignition
- Cause: Lightning
- Motive: Utilized to help prevent future wildfires

The 2024 Little Yamsay Fire was a wildfire that burned in Klamath County, Oregon from April 20 to May 13, 2024. The fire was utilized to help break up the forests around Klamath Falls, and was 100% contained as of August 2024. It was the first wildfire of the 2024 Oregon wildfire season, and was the 11th-largest as of August 2.

== Progression ==
The fire was first reported at around 6:00 p.m. on April 20. The fire slowly grew in acreage until May 1, where it reached a size of 240 acres. 100 personnel were assigned to the fire. It was determined that the fire should be let spread, as to break up toe landscape and prevent against catastrophic wildfires in the future. On May 2, the fire was allowed to cover an additional 365 acres as part of this plan. By May 3, the fire had again grown to 633 acres while under supervision from 120 personnel.

On May 4, the fire rapidly grew in size, covering 1,350 acres of land and brush. By 9:58 a.m. on May 5, the fire had reached an acreage of 2,009. A large tree unrelated to the fire fell on a firefighting cab that was en route, and none of the four passengers sustained injuries. On May 6, the number of personnel assigned to the fire dropped to 92.

On May 7, the fire was determined to be 15 miles southeast of Chemult, and remained at a constant 2,009 acres. In the morning hours of May 8, the number of personnel assigned to the fire again dropped to 91, and on May 9 the fire was purposefully let grow to 2,200 acres. On May 10, the fire reached 3,200 acres in size, and the firing operation continued with 106 personnel assigned to the fire.

By May 11, the fire reached 3,278 acres in size, and there were no evacuations. By May 12, the fire reached 4,791 acres in size, and by 9:05 a.m. on May 13 this number went up to 6,340. The fire was considered 100% contained on the same day.

== Usage by firefighters ==
The fire was allowed to grow in 3 phases (Phase I, Phase II and Phase III) and was purposefully ignited further during Phase II to reduce small and crowded ground foliage, including bushes and shrubs, that could potentially create a large and potentially catastrophic wildfire in the future.

== See also ==
- 2024 California wildfires
- Park Fire
