= Crosswhite Fire =

2026 wildfire in Oregon, United States

- Date: July 15–October 2, 2026
- Location: Wheeler, Wasco, Crook, and Jefferson counties, Oregon, United States

Statistics
- Status: Extinguished

Map
- Perimeter map of Crosswhite Fire (map data)

The Crosswhite Fire was a wildfire in the U.S. state of Oregon. It began on July 15, 2026, northwest of Twickenham, when more than 100 lightning strikes ignited numerous fires across Wheeler County during an overnight storm. As of September 5, 2026, the fire is 342,923 acres and 92% contained.

== Progression ==
By July 20, 2026, most of the fires that began on July 15–16 had merged with the original Crosswhite Fire, including the Twickenham, Red Rock, Pat's Cabin, and Cove's Creek fires, reaching an estimated 113,046 acres; the Camel Hump, Parrish, and Deep Canyon fires remained separate. The merged fires, together with several numbered incidents, were collectively designated the Rowe Creek Complex, with the majority of land affected in Wheeler County. By July 23, the fire had grown to more than 131,000 acres, prompting Level 3 "go now" evacuation orders across a large portion of Wheeler County from Clarno to Mitchell.

On July 24, 2026, the fire was split for management purposes into the Crosswhite West and Crosswhite East fires, divided along the Wheeler–Jefferson county line, after the Box Springs Fire merged into it. At that point the fire was 175,079 acres and 15 percent contained; although dozens of structures, including many homes, were threatened, no homes had been lost, though two small outbuildings had been destroyed. By August 1, 2026, the fire had reached 295,835 acres and was 51% contained, with 73 crews, 22 dozers, 179 engines, 12 skidgines, and 2,332 personnel assigned to the broader complex.

== Response ==
On July 17, 2026, Governor Tina Kotek invoked Oregon's Emergency Conflagration Act for the Rowe Creek Complex in Wheeler County, after the Wheeler County Fire Defense Board Chief requested assistance and the State Fire Marshal concurred that the threat exceeded local firefighting capabilities. Kotek later separately invoked the act for the Marks Creek area of the Crosswhite West Fire in Crook and Jefferson counties.

In September 2026, the Federal Emergency Management Agency (FEMA) denied Oregon's request for a major disaster declaration grant for the Rowe Creek Complex, while approving requests for several other Oregon fires burning the same month. Oregon senators Jeff Merkley and Ron Wyden sought an explanation from FEMA for the differing decisions.
