= Durkee Fire =

2024 wildfire in Oregon, USA

- Part of the 2024 Oregon wildfires
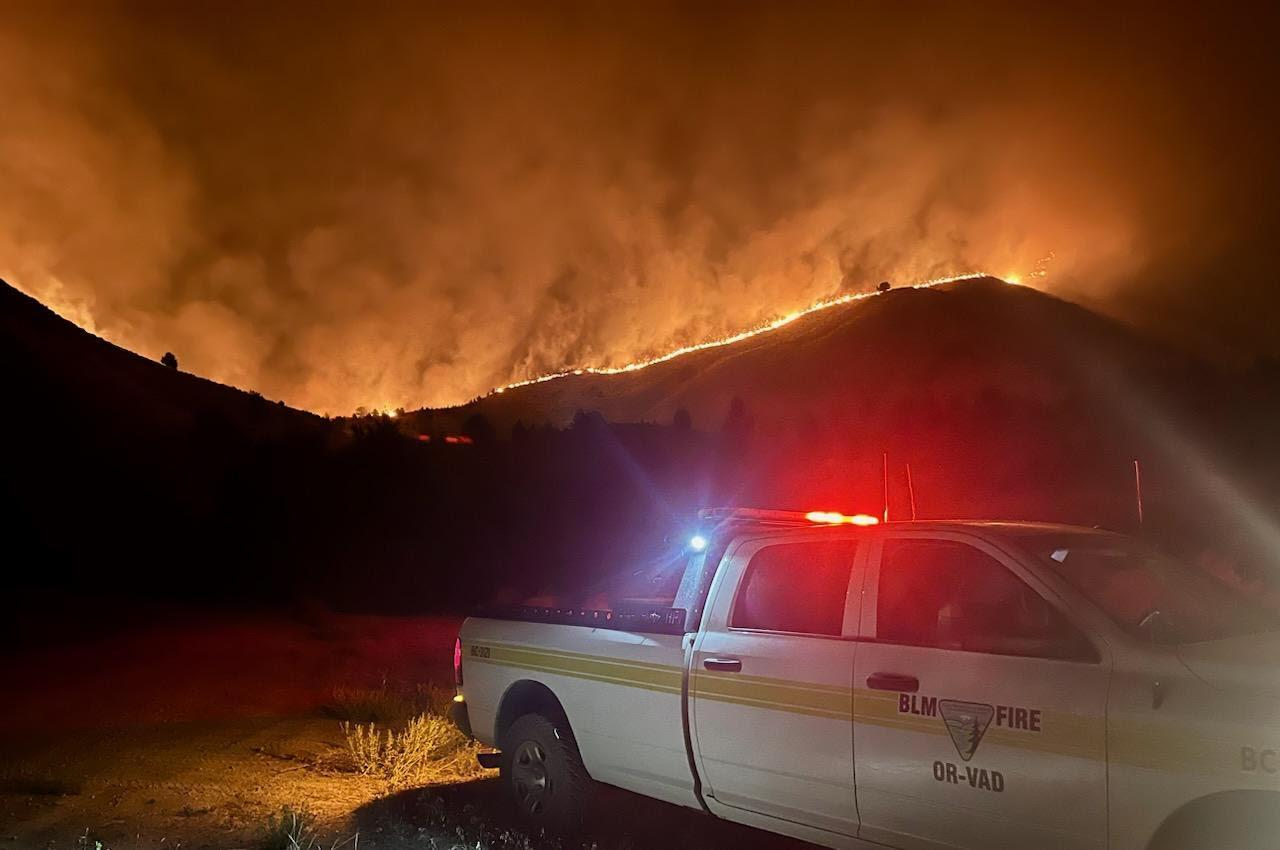
- A Bureau of Land Management vehicle at the Durkee Fire on July 21, 2024
- Date: July 17, 2024 – August 7, 2024; (21 days); (PDT)
- Location: Baker and Malheur counties, Oregon, U.S.
- Coordinates: 44°32′52″N 117°28′38″W

Statistics
- Status: Extinguished
- Burned area: 294,265 acres (1,190.85 km^{2})

The Durkee Fire was a wildfire that burned in Baker and Malheur counties in eastern Oregon. The Durkee Fire was briefly the largest wildfire in the United States and was the largest wildfire in Oregon's 2024 wildfire season.

== Cause ==
A lightning strike on private property in Baker County, Oregon, ignited the fire on July 17, 2024, at approximately 9:30 am.

== Background ==
The fire burned 294,265 acres (1,190.85 km^{2}) in Baker and Malheur counties, and is considered a megafire. The Durkee Fire was the largest wildfire in Oregon's 2024 wildfire season and the fifth largest in modern Oregon history.

The Durkee Fire was at one point the largest active wildfire in the United States. It was fully contained on August 7.

== Effects ==
As of July 24, 2024, the fire has destroyed 2 homes and 12 other buildings.

On July 20, the fire prompted the evacuation of Huntington, Oregon, a city home to about 500 people. On July 24, gas service to residents in the town was shut off.

The fire has prompted intermittent closures of Interstate 84 in Oregon (I-84), including from Pendleton to Ontario on July 24. The Durkee Fire is active to the west of I-84, but a separate smaller fire called the Thompson Fire has been active to the east of the road. Additionally, the Cow Valley Fire is to the southeast.

Idaho Power, a major electricity company in the area, warned customers to prepare for outages, and 7,000 of its customers had no power by the afternoon of July 24.

The fire has killed hundreds of cattle.
