= Claire Hall =

American politician

Claire Elizabeth Hall

Member of the Lincoln County, Oregon County Commission
- In office January 6, 2005 – January 4, 2026
- Succeeded by: (vacant)

Personal details
- Born: September 27, 1959 Portland, Oregon
- Died: January 4, 2026 (aged 66)
- Education: Pacific University; Northwestern University

Claire Elizabeth Hall (September 27, 1959 – January 4, 2026) was an American politician and journalist who served on the Lincoln County, Oregon County Commission from 2005 until her death in 2026. She came out as transgender in 2018, and was the first elected official to transition while in office.

== Early life ==
Hall was born in 1959 in Portland, Oregon. She suffered from gender dysphoria at a young age, but was afraid to express it for fear of how her family or society would react. She studied communications at Pacific University, and received a master's degree in journalism from Northwestern University.

After graduating, she worked for the Portland Public Schools radio station (KBPS) as a producer. In 1987, she moved to Newport, where she worked as a reporter for the Newport News Times and a news director for several Newport radio stations.

== Political career ==
Hall was first elected as a county commissioner in 2004, defeating Republican candidate Karen Gerttula. While in office, she was an advocate for helping Oregon's homeless population, building more affordable housing, and regulating short-term and vacation rentals in the county. She served on the Governor's Council on Alcohol and Drug Programs, the Oregon Ending Homelessness Advisory Council,, and as president of the Association of Oregon Counties. She was reelected five times to the position, in 2008, 2012, 2016, 2020, and 2024.

=== Recall ===
In July 2025, a recall campaign was launched against Hall, which garnered the nearly 4,000 signatures necessary to be placed on the ballot. The recall focused on Hall's handling of public meetings as commission chair, the exclusion of fellow commissioner Casey Miller from the county office, and possible mismanagement of Lincoln County's finances. A review by the Oregon Government Ethics Commission, released in October 2025, also concluded that the county commission might have violated the law by exempting certain county departments from a hiring freeze without public meetings.

Although Hall's commissioner position was nonpartisan, the recall campaign became politically polarized, with Lincoln County Republicans supporting her ouster and Lincoln County Democrats campaigning against it; Hall also faced several transphobic comments from recall supporters. After her death, the recall election became void.

== Personal life ==
Hall began her transition in 2017, soon after being divorced from her wife. She began with piercing her ears, before beginning electrolysis and gender-affirming hormone therapy. “I think I finally reached a point where I no longer saw an insurmountable barrier to transitioning,” Hall said. “I am living in a supportive community where I have a lot of friends and supporters...I finally found myself looking for a path to do it instead of finding reasons not to do it.” She publicly came out on June 3, 2018.

Hall was the author of McCallandia, a utopian novel set in an alternate universe where Oregon governor Tom McCall became president.

After a fall in September 2025, Hall was hospitalized for a fractured hip, shoulder, and several ribs. She attended commission meetings remotely but suffered from worsening health issues, and died on January 4, 2026 at the age of 66.
