= Chris Beck (politician) =

American politician

Member of the Oregon House of Representatives from the 12th district
- In office 1997–2003
- Preceded by: Gail Shibley

Personal details
- Born: May 29, 1963 (age 63) Portland, Oregon, U.S.
- Party: Democratic
- Education: Brown University (BA); Harvard University (MPA)

Chris L. Beck (born May 29, 1963) is an American politician who served in the Oregon House of Representatives from 1997 to 2003, representing the 12th district. A member of the Democratic Party, he is a candidate for the U.S. House of Representatives in Oregon's 2nd congressional district in the 2026 elections.

== Early life and education ==
Beck was born on May 29, 1963 in Portland, Oregon. He earned a Bachelor of Arts degree in history from Brown University in 1985 and later earned a Master of Public Administration degree from the John F. Kennedy School of Government at Harvard University.

== Career ==
Beck began his political career as a reading clerk for the Oregon Senate in 1987. From 1988 to 1990, he worked for the rail program of the Portland Office of Transportation. In 1991, he served as a staffer for the Oregon Senate's Agriculture and Natural Resources committee. From 1990 to 2004, he worked as a conservation professional at the Trust for Public Land.

Beck was elected to the Oregon House of Representatives in 1996, representing the 12th district. He served three terms and was a member of the chamber's Ways and Means Subcommittee from 1997 to 1999.

Beck served as a rural policy advisor for the United States Department of Agriculture during the Obama administration, from 2010 to 2016. He is a candidate for the U.S. House of Representatives in Oregon's 2nd congressional district in the 2026 elections.

Beck has served as a volunteer election observer for the Organization for Security and Co-operation in Europe. He is a trustee of the Henry Richmond Land Use Defense Fund and a board member of the Friends of the Columbia Gorge. He is also a supporter of 1000 Friends of Oregon and a consultant for the Hatfield School of Government at Portland State University.
