= Interurban (restaurant) =

Defunct bar and restaurant in Portland, Oregon, U.S.

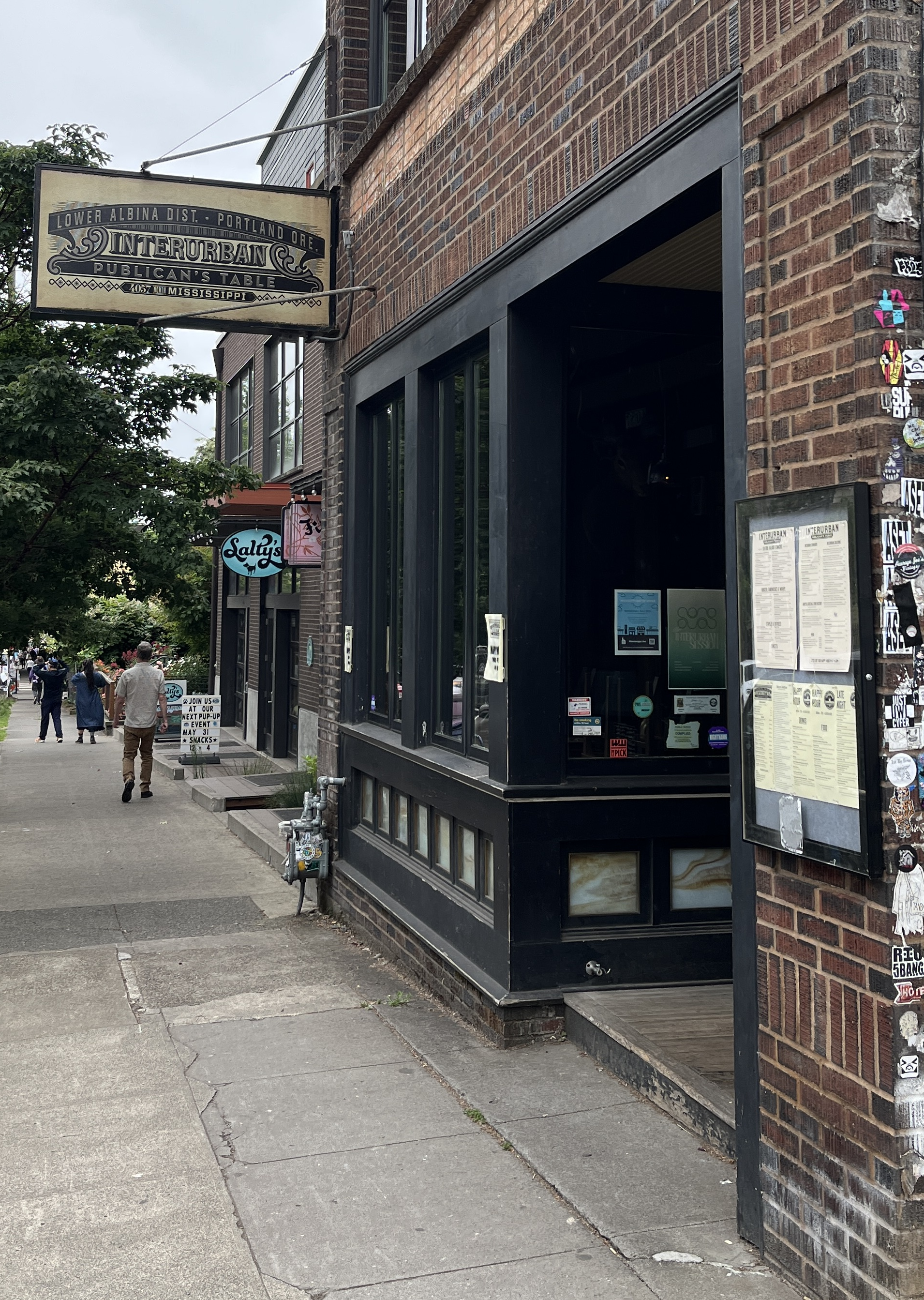
- The bar's exterior, 2025
- Interactive map of Interurban

Restaurant information
- Established: 2011
- Closed: January 2026
- Location: 4057 North Mississippi Avenue, Portland, Multnomah, Oregon, 97227, United States
- Coordinates: 45.5530°N 122.6757°W
- Website: interurbanpdx.com

Interurban was a bar and restaurant in Portland, Oregon, United States. It opened in 2011 and announced plans to close permanently in January 2026.

== Description ==
The bar and restaurant Interurban operated in north Portland. It had a patio and has been described as a gastropub, a saloon, a tavern, and a "dusky" watering hole. According to The Oregonian, the bar's name was "drawn from the line of electric trains that ran throughout the Portland metro area in the first half of the 20th century". The interior had a mural depicting the Steel Bridge. The exterior had a "free wall" with poster art, which Axios Portland described as "one of Portland's most recognizable landmarks".

Food options included biscuits and gravy, gazpacho, smash burgers and French fries. The Boar Burger had chiles, onions, queso botanero, pickled jalapeños, and aioli, and the Publican's Board had rabbit rillettes and venison-cherry terrine. In addition to cocktails and beer, the bar served Jello shots. Interurban also served brunch on weekends.

== History ==
Interurban opened in 2011, in the space that previously housed Lovely Hula Hands; a fire broke out during the soft opening in November. John Gorham, Kurt Huffman and Dan Hart are owners. It hosted the "Last Sunday BBQ" series. The business updated the menu and expanded happy hour in 2013. It participated in Dumpling Week in 2023, serving fried arepas with fried chicken gravy and dill pickles. In January 2026, the business announced plans to close permanently.

== Reception ==
Alex Frane included the business in Thrillist's 2016 overview of Portland's best cocktail bars. He also included the bottled cocktails in the website's 2016 "cocktail bucket list" of the city, or "50 Drinks to Try Before You Die".
