= Oregon AFL–CIO =

- Oregon American Federation of Labor and Congress of Industrial Organizations
- Headquarters: 3645 SE 32nd Ave; Portland, OR 97202
- Location: United States
- Members: 277,000 (2020)^{[1]}
- Key people: Graham Trainor, President
- Affiliations: AFL–CIO
- Website: oraflcio.org
- ^{1} Per official website above.

The Oregon American Federation of Labor and Congress of Industrial Organizations (ORAFL–CIO) is the Oregon state affiliate of the AFL–CIO, the largest union federation in the United States.

The Oregon AFL–CIO engages in assisting unions in organizing, political education campaigns, legislative advocacy, building labor-community partnerships, education and training. Among the Oregon AFL–CIO's areas of interest are: creating family-wage jobs, workers' rights, economic development, community engagement, activist training and labor education.

== Chapters ==
In 2015 11 of Oregon AFL–CIO's autonomous Central Labor Councils (CLC) were dissolved and consolidated into larger chapters of the statewide affiliate. These chapters, still known as either area labor federations or central labor councils (CLC) act as a regional representative for union individuals, union affiliates at the regional level. Personnel at the CLC level assist in the facilitation of strategic planning, budgeting, and assist in political campaigns.

- Central Oregon CLC – (based in Bend, Oregon)
- North Coast Labor Federation – (based in Astoria, Oregon)
- Eastern Oregon CLC – (based in Pendleton, Oregon)
- Lane County CLC – (based in Eugene, Oregon)
- Linn-Benton-Lincoln CLC – (based in Albany, Oregon)
- Marion-Polk-Yamhill CLC – (based in Salem, Oregon)
- Northwest Oregon CLC – (based in Portland, Oregon)
- Southern Oregon CLC – (based in Central Point, Oregon)

== Affiliated unions ==
- American Federation of Government Employees (AFGE)
- American Federation of Musicians (AFM)
- American Federation of State, County and Municipal Employees (AFSCME)
- American Federation of Teachers (AFT)
- American Postal Workers Union (APWU)
- Amalgamated Transit Union (ATU)
- International Association of Heat and Frost Insulators and Allied Workers (AWIU)
- International Union of Bricklayers and Allied Craftworkers (BAC)
- Brotherhood of Railway Signalmen (RBS)
- Bakery, Confectionery, Tobacco Workers and Grain Millers' International Union (BCTGM)
- Communications Workers of America (CWA)
- Glass, Molders, Pottery, Plastics and Allied Workers International Union (GMPIU)
- International Association of Bridge, Structural, Ornamental and Reinforcing Iron Workers (Ironworkers)
- International Association of Fire Fighters (IAFF)
- International Association of Machinists and Aerospace Workers (IAM)
- International Alliance of Theatrical Stage Employees (IATSE)
- International Brotherhood of Boilermakers (IBB)
- International Brotherhood of Electrical Workers (IBEW)
- International Federation of Professional and Technical Engineers (IFPTE)
- International Organization of Masters, Mates & Pilots (MM&P)
- International Union of Elevator Constructors (IUEC)
- International Union of Operating Engineers (IUOE)
- International Union of Painters and Allied Trades (IUPAT)
- Laborers' International Union of North America (LIUNA)
- National Association of Letter Carriers (NALC)
- National Air Traffic Controllers Association (NATCA)
- Operative Plasterers' and Cement Masons' International Association (OPCMIA)
- Office and Professional Employees International Union (OPEIU)
- Professional Aviation Safety Specialists (PASS)
- Screen Actors Guild, American Federation of Television and Radio Artists (SAG-AFTRA)
- Service Employees International Union (SEIU)
- International Association of Sheet Metal, Air, Rail and Transportation Workers (SMART)
- United Association (UA)
- United Auto Workers (UAW)
- United Food and Commercial Workers (UFCW)
- United Farm Workers (UFW)
- Union of Needletrades, Industrial and Textile Employees (UNITE)
- United Steelworkers (USW)
- United Union of Roofers, Waterproofers and Allied Workers (RWAW)
- Utility Workers Union of America (UWUA)
