= 2024 Oregon wildfires =

Natural disasters in the USA

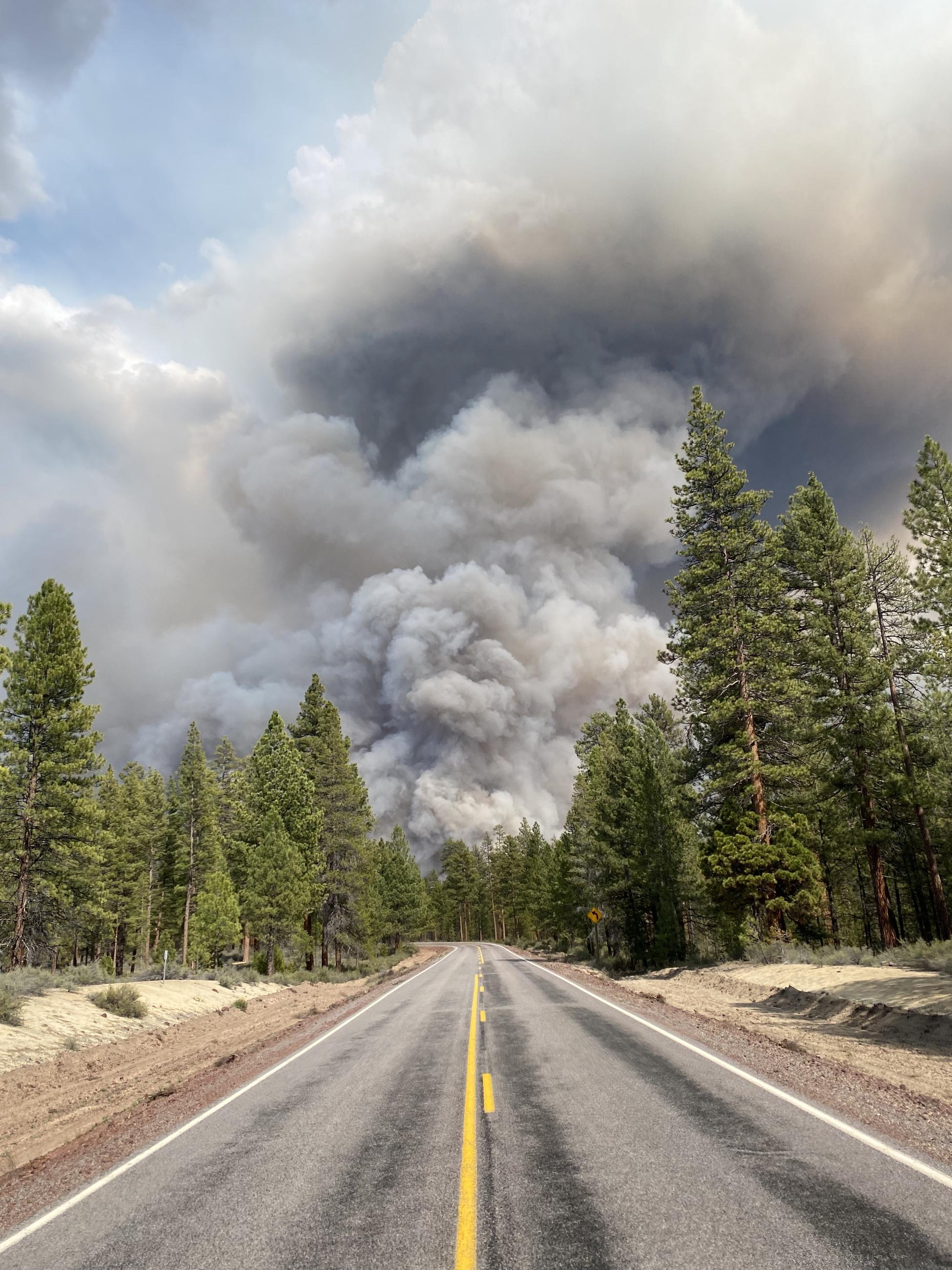
- Smoke column from the Little Yamsay Fire as seen on Silver Lake Road - May 11, 2024

Statistics
- Total fires: 2,039
- Total area: 1,915,554 acres (775,197 ha)

Impacts
- Deaths: 1

The 2024 Oregon wildfire season was a series of wildfires that burned throughout the U.S. state of Oregon.

Predictions for the 2024 fire season made by the National Interagency Fire Center forecasted above average wildfire potential in the southeastern portion of the state and average wildfire potential throughout the rest of Oregon.

As of September 23, an estimated 1.9 million acres have burned, breaking the state record previously set in 2020. The Oregon Department of Forestry (ODF) declared an official end to the record-breaking fire season on October 28.

== Background ==
"Fire season" in Oregon typically begins in mid-May and ends with the first rains that normally begins in late September. Drought, snowpack levels, and local weather conditions play a role in Oregon's fire season, particularly in Eastern and Southwest Oregon. During peak fire season from July to September, most wildfires are caused by lightning, while ignitions in the early and later parts of the season are related to humans. Warm, dry conditions in summer heighten the wildfire risk. After over 100 years of fire suppression and prevention of all fires, there is now an abundance of fuel. Climate change is leading to a reduced snowpack with an earlier and reduced snowmelt, so there is a higher risk for areas that receive wildfires.

== Summary ==
By late September, Oregon recorded a record-breaking ~1.9 million acres burned—a staggering jump compared to 2023’s much more moderate figures. The wildfire season featured several megafires—including the lightning-ignited Durkee Fire, which charred roughly 294,000 acres in eastern Oregon and became the largest blaze of the year in the state—as well as the Little Yamsay Fire, the season’s first, which spread over 6,340 acres near Klamath Falls but was fully contained with no fatalities.

Spending on wildfire response surged: the Oregon Department of Forestry reported a staggering $132 million spent—more than triple the usual amount—with total suppression costs nearing $317 million, much of which is expected to be reimbursed federally. In response, lawmakers convened a special legislative session, approving $218 million in emergency funding to shore up resources and prepare for increasing wildfire risk amid a warming climate.

== List of wildfires ==
The following is a list of fires that burned more than 1,000 acres (400 ha), or produced significant structural damage or casualties.

Name	County	Acres	Start date	Containment date (Note: Containment means that fire crews have established and secured control lines around the fire's perimeter. These lines are artificial barriers, like trenches or cleared vegetation, designed to stop the fire's spread, or natural barriers like rivers. Containment reflects progress in managing the fire but does not necessarily mean the fire is starved of fuel, under control, or put out.)	Notes	Ref
Little Yamsay	Klamath	6,340	April 20	May 13	Lightning-caused	
Bowden	Malheur	5,720	June 6	August 18		
Upper Applegate	Jackson	1,143	June 20	June 30	Caused by human activity.	
Long Bend	Wasco	1,024	June 22	July 26		
Darlene 3	Deschutes	3,903	June 25	July 1	undetermined	
Little Valley	Malheur	17,901	June 26	July 1	undetermined	
Dry Lake	Malheur	2,670	June 26	October 9	Lightning-caused.	
Salt Creek	Jackson	4,102	July 7	July 24	Human-caused	
Upper Pine	Harney	1,086	July 8	July 19	undetermined	
Larch Creek	Wasco	18,286	July 9	July 26	Human-caused	
Falls	Harney	151,680	July 10	August 22	Human-caused, destroyed 23 buildings, pilot killed in tanker plane crash.	
Huntington Mutual Aid	Baker	4,511	July 10	July 16	undetermined	
River	Malheur	2,799	July 10	July 13	undetermined, near Owyhee Dam	
Cow Valley	Malheur	133,490	July 11	October 1	Human-caused	
Bonita Road	Malheur	2,727	July 11	July 25	Human-caused	
Lone Rock	Gilliam, Morrow, Wheeler	137,222	July 13	September 11	undetermined	
Diamond Complex	Douglas	11,141	July 16	2024	12 Lightning-caused fires.	
Ore	Lane, Linn	3,479	July 16	September 26	Under Investigation.	
Red	Klamath	3,060	July 17	November 12	Lightning-caused fire.	
Battle Mountain Complex	Umatilla, Grant, Morrow	183,026	July 17	August 20	Lightning-caused. Originally consisting of the North Fork Owens and Snake Fires, the Monkey Creek and Boneyard fires also merged into the complex.	
Chalk	Lane	5,991	July 17	September 14	Part of the Oakridge Lightning Fires Complex.	
Coffeepot	Lane	6,176	July 17	August 23	Part of the Oakridge Lightning Fires Complex.	
Coombes Canyon	Umatilla	3,224	July 17	July 22	Lightning-caused.	
Durkee	Baker, Malheur	294,265	July 17	September 9	Lightning-caused; 5th-largest wildfire in Oregon history; hundreds of cattle killed.	
Lane 1	Douglas, Lane	25,951	July 17	November 10		
Middle Fork	Douglas, Klamath	5,286	July 17	October 31	Mostly located inside Crater Lake National Park, closing the north entrance.	
Pilot Rock	Umatilla	11,349	July 17	July 26	Lightning-caused.	
Moss Mountain	Lane	2,849	July 17	October 25	Lightning-caused.	
208	Lane	11,263	July 17	October 25	Lightning-caused fire.	
Pyramid	Linn	1,312	July 17	September 24	Lightning-caused fire.	
Twin Springs	Malheur	2,815	July 17	July 18		
Horse Heaven Creek	Lane	3,198	July 18	November 6	Part of Homestead Complex.	
No Man	Lane	2,148	July 18	November	Part of Homestead Complex.	
Whisky Creek	Hood River	3,240	July 20	October 31		
Fuller Lake	Douglas	6,378	July 20	November 5	Part of Homestead Complex.	
Courtrock	Grant	20,019	July 21	August 17	Lightning caused.	
Badlands Complex	Baker	54,563	July 22	August 12	Lightning-caused fires. Caused closures of Interstate 84 in eastern Oregon. Includes the Thompson and Coyote fires.	
Crazy Creek	Crook, Wheeler	86,968	July 22	September 25	Lightning-caused	
Telephone	Harney	54,034	July 22	August 21	Lightning-caused fires.	
Durgan	Crook	3,245	July 22	July 25		
Microwave Tower	Hood River, Wasco	1,312	July 22	August 12		
Camp Creek	Crook	1,581	July 23	July	Lightning-caused.	
Hole In The Ground	Malheur	98,977	July 24	August 2		
Whiskey Mountain	Harney	4,357	July 24	August 8		
Cedar Creek	Malheur	1,546	July 24	July 30		
Grasshopper	Malheur	2,665	July 24	August 2		
Gilespie Spring	Malheur	2,556	July 24	July 25	Lightning-caused.	
Poison Creek	Grant	1,060	July 25	August 7		
Sand	Grant	7,582	July 25	August 15	Lightning-caused.	
Powerline Road	Umatilla	1,500	July 25	August 1	Also referred to as the Walla Walla River Road Fire.	
Elk Lane	Jefferson	5,176	August 4	August 14	Lightning-caused.	
Town Gulch	Baker	18,234	August 5	August 19		
Porcupine	Harney	6,495	August 5	August 19		
Soldier Creek	Malheur	11,061	August 5	August 14		
Warner Peak	Lake	65,866	August 5	August 24		
Dixon	Douglas	1,965	August 10	August 21		
0672 RV	Gilliam	5,490	August 17	August 21		
Copperfield	Klamath	3,822	September 1	September 16		
Conroy Road	Wasco	1,500	September 1	September 2		
Wiley Flat	Crook	30,185	September 2	October 11		
Shoe Fly	Wheeler	26,817	September 2	September 15		
Oak Canyon	Wasco, Sherman	15,170	September 2	September 6		
Jones	Malheur	7,162	September 2	September 11		
Rail Ridge	Crook, Grant	176,661	September 2	November 1		
Solomon	Harney	2,600	September 2	September 8		
Sagehen	Harney	5,953	September 2	October		
Devils Knob	Douglas	4,149	September 5	October 17		
Bowman Well	Lake	2,853	September 6	October 14	Lightning caused.	
Firestone	Lake, Deschutes	9,462	September 6	October 5	Lightning caused.	
Service	Wheeler	23,890	September 6	September 25	Part of Fossil Complex.	
Flat Top	Lake	36,362	September 6	October 5	Likely lightning-caused.	
Young Grasshopper	Lane	5,313	September 6	November 9	Likely lightning-caused.	
Buck Creek	Lake	5,758	September 7	October 8	Likely lightning-caused.	
Linton Creek	Lane	1,310	September 7	November 3	Likely lightning-caused.	
Little Lava	Deschutes	15,514	September 8	November 15	Likely lightning-caused.	
Pine	Deschutes	6,634	October 7	October 24		

Perimeters of 2024 Oregon wildfires (map data)

== See also ==
- 2024 United States wildfires
