= 2012 in Oregon =

- Decades: 1990s; 2000s; 2010s; 2020s
- See also: History of Oregon; Historical outline of Oregon; List of years in Oregon; 2012 in the United States

The year 2012 in Oregon involved several major events.

== Politics and government ==
=== Incumbents ===
- Governor: John Kitzhaber (D)
- Secretary of State: Kate Brown (D)

== Events ==
=== January ===
- January 16–20 – January 2012 Pacific Northwest snowstorm

=== February ===
- February 14 – A 6.0 magnitude earthquake strikes off the Oregon Coast.
- February 16 – LGBTQ magazine PQ Monthly publishes its first issue.

=== May ===
- May 29 – Nicholas Drapela, a chemistry professor at Oregon State University, is told his instructional contract will not be renewed. Drapela tells multiple press agencies that he suspects he is being let go due to his views on climate change skepticism.

=== June ===
- June 21–July 1 – The 2012 United States Olympic trials (track and field) are held in Eugene.

=== July ===
- July 8 – The Long Draw Fire is ignited by lightning.
- July 14 – Strikeforce: Rockhold vs. Kennedy

=== August ===
- August 5 – Barry Point Fire is ignited by lightning.

=== September ===
- September 17 – Barry Point Fire is fully contained.

=== November ===
- November 13 – This England, an album by the Oregon Symphony, is released.
- November 6 – 2012 Oregon elections
  - Tina Kotek is elected Speaker of the House, becoming the first openly gay woman elected to a leadership position in any U.S. state legislature.
- November 28 – A jury indicts a Clackamas County election worker for tampering with ballots in the election earlier in the month.

=== December ===
- December 11 – Clackamas Town Center shooting
- December 19 – The Oregon Insurance Division of the Oregon Department of Consumer and Business Services announces new regulations that require health insurance agencies in the state to cover transgender healthcare and other medical services without discriminating against a person's actual or perceived gender identity.
- December 28 – A tour bus crashes down an embankment in Eastern Oregon, killing 9 people and injuring at least 30.
