= 2015 in Oregon =

- Decades: 1990s; 2000s; 2010s; 2020s
- See also: History of Oregon; Historical outline of Oregon; List of years in Oregon; 2015 in the United States

The year 2015 in Oregon involved several major events.

According to Philip Mote, director of the Oregon Climate Change Institute at Oregon State University, 2015 set a record as the hottest year in the state.

== Politics and government ==
=== Incumbents ===
- Governor: Kate Brown (D)
- Secretary of State:
  - Jeanne Atkins (D) – After March 11

== Events ==
=== January ===
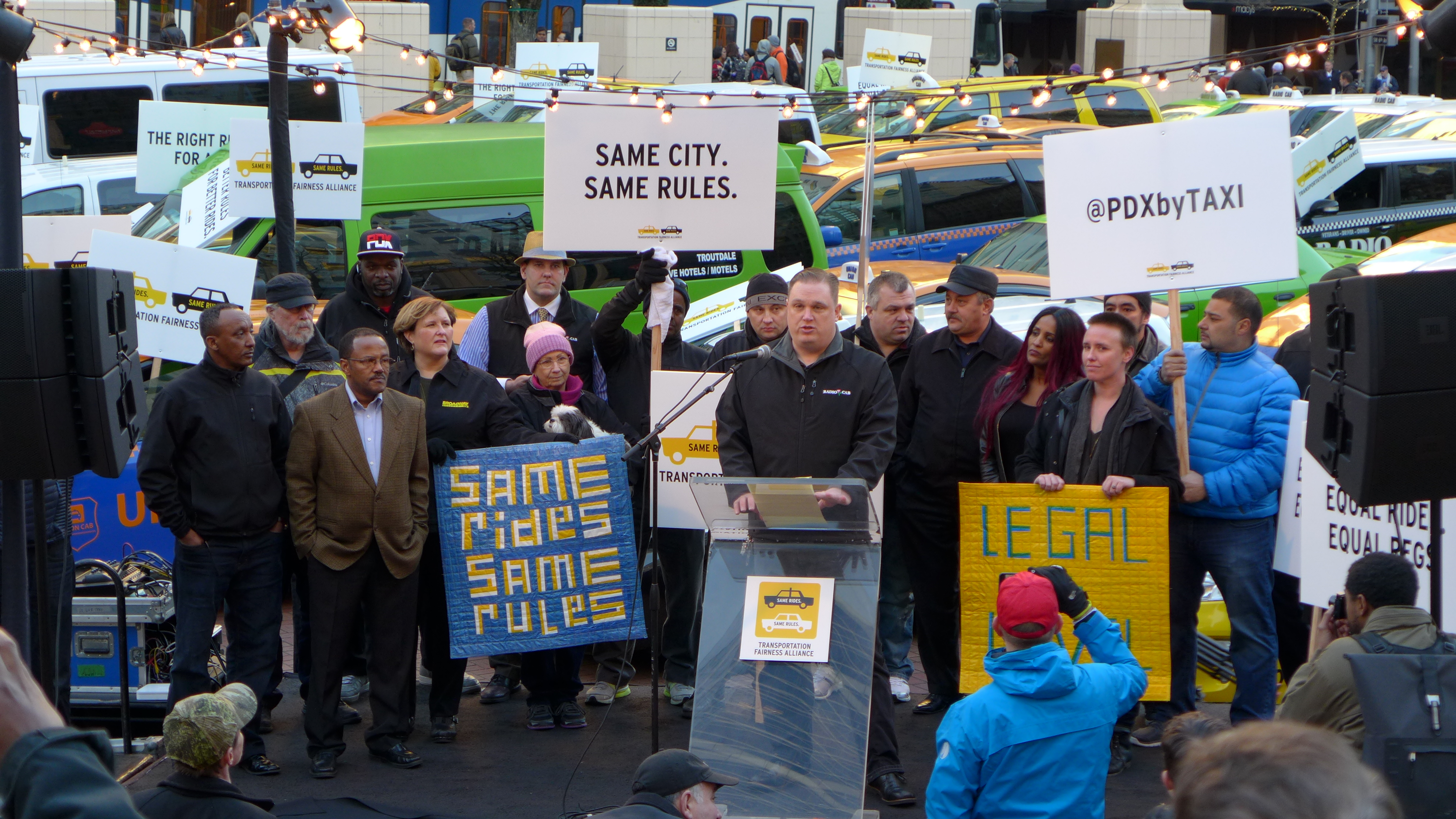
Portland taxi drivers protest in Pioneer Courthouse Square on January 13

- January 1
  - Statewide minimum wage increases to $9.25 per hour, the second-highest of any state in the U.S.
  - Oregon's Medicaid plans begin covering gender-affirming care.
- January 13 – Portland taxi drivers stage a protest advocating for more regulation of Uber in the city by parking their cabs in Pioneer Courthouse Square.
- January 20 – Portland-based indie rock band The Decemberists releases their seventh album: What a Terrible World, What a Beautiful World.

=== February ===
- February 17 – Kendra Sunderland is issued a citation for performing erotic acts on camera in the Oregon State University library.
- February 18 – Governor John Kitzhaber resigns after months of public discussion and investigation into his wife, Cylvia Hayes. Kate Brown, who up to this point was Secretary of State, is sworn in as Governor.

=== March ===
- March 18 – Susan Ackerman of the Oregon Public Utility Commission unexpectedly resigns, effective in May.
- March 25 – The Red and Black Cafe, an anarchist cafe in Portland, announces that it will close.

=== May ===
- May 1 – In Portland, a group of protesters split off from a May Day march and clash with police.
- May 15
  - A magnitude 3.0 earthquake strikes northern Oregon.
  - The Oregon Health Authority issues a toxic algae bloom warning for Detroit Lake.

=== June ===
- June 10–13 – 2015 NCAA Division I Outdoor Track and Field Championships
- June 15 – The 2015 fire season begins.
- June 18 – Oregon Senate Bill 552 is signed into law, codifying workplace protections for domestic workers in Oregon.
- June 22 – Oregon Senate Bill 454, which mandates that employers provide paid sick leave benefits, is signed into law.
- June 23–28 – 2015 USA Outdoor Track and Field Championships
- June 25 – The Oregon Health Authority issues a toxic algae bloom warning for Lake Billy Chinook.
- June 26 – Following the Supreme Court's ruling on Obergefell v. Hodges, hundreds of LGBTQ people and supporters gather at Terry Schrunk Plaza and outside Portland City Hall to celebrate the legalization of gay marriage.
- June 27 – 12th annual Portland World Naked Bike Ride

=== July ===
- July 1 – Burnside Burn
- July 2 – Intel president Renée James announces that she will quit, effective January 2016.
- July 3 – Weed the People
- July 4 – A 4.2 magnitude earthquake strikes near the Eugene-Springfield metropolitan area.
- July 9
  - The Oregon Supreme Court rules that police cannot ask whether citizens have firearms unless they have a specific concern for their own safety.
  - The Oregon Health Authority issues a toxic algae bloom warning for a section of the Willamette River near Ross Island.
- July 13 – Jacob Sherman, a sustainability official at Portland State University, agrees to increase his monthly payments to two companies that he firebombed in 2001 as part of the Earth Liberation Front.
- July 16 – In Portland, an estimated 600 gallons of sewage escapes from a blocked sewage line.
- July 21 – Governor Brown adds Curry, Hood River, and Union Counties to the list of Oregon counties that are in drought.
- July 24 – A team of scientists survey Pythia's Oasis, a cold seep off the coast of Oregon, for the first time using a ROPOS ROV.

=== August ===
- August 5 – The Otto and Verdell Rutherford House in Northeast Portland is added to the National Register of Historic Places for being the site of important African-American civil rights activism in Oregon.
- August 9 – Over 28,000 people attend a Bernie Sanders rally at the Moda Center in Portland.
- August 17 – The Independent Party of Oregon officially qualifies as a major political party.
- August 22–24 – The August Fire burns east of Banks.
- August 24 – In Portland, Janelle Monáe and Jidenna lead a rally against police brutality alongside Don't Shoot PDX.

=== September ===
- September 12 – Tilikum Crossing, a bridge across the Willamette River for pedestrians, cyclists, and the MAX Orange Line light rail, opens in Portland.
- September 13 – Starky's, a Portland gay bar and restaurant, closes.

=== October ===
- Unknown date – Detroit Lake reaches a seasonal record low water level, 143 feet (44 m) below the seasonal normal. Remnants of the town of Old Detroit, which was abandoned when the lake was created in 1953, are found in some dried-up parts of the lake.
- October 1 – 2015 Umpqua Community College shooting
- October 7 – Portland city officials vote to rename Columbus Day to Indigenous Peoples' Day.
- October 9 – President Obama visits Roseburg to speak about the Umpqua Community College shooting. About 150 people protest the visit.
- October 25 – The 2015 fire season ends.

=== November ===
- November 3 – The skeleton of a blue whale washes up on the shore of Gold Beach.
- November 27 – Pizza Jerk opens.

== Deaths ==
- August 10 – Fred Eckhardt (born 1926), brewer and writer
- August 30 – Edward Fadeley (born 1929), judge
- September 27 – Fred Stickel (born 1921), writer and newspaper publisher
