= 2013 in Oregon =

- Decades: 1990s; 2000s; 2010s; 2020s
- See also: History of Oregon; Historical outline of Oregon; List of years in Oregon; 2013 in the United States

The year 2013 in Oregon involved several major events.

Employment levels increased in six counties with populations above 75,000 from December 2012 to December 2013.

Oregon was a top destination for inter-state movers in 2013, according to a study by United Van Lines.

The 2013 wildfire season set a record for the most land burned since the 1951 Tillamook Burn; about "10 times the average amount" burned. In late July and August, the Douglas Complex fire burned about 19,760 hectares (76.3 sq mi) of land in the state.

== Politics and government ==
=== Incumbents ===
- Governor: John Kitzhaber (D)
- Secretary of State: Kate Brown (D)

== Events ==
=== January ===
- January 14 – The 77th Oregon Legislative Assembly convenes.
- January 17 – Klein v. Oregon Bureau of Labor and Industries: A couple is refused service at Sweet Cakes by Melissa because the cake they ordered is for a same-sex wedding.
- January 19 – Jadin Bell, a gay teenager from La Grande, hangs himself as a result of bullying.

=== February ===
- February 3 – Jadin Bell dies at OHSU after he is taken off of life support.

=== April ===
- April 21 – The Portland Thorns play their first home game, with 16,479 people in attendance.
- April 27–29 – The 10th and final Stumptown Comics Fest is held in Portland.

=== May ===
- May 9 – The Dalai Lama visits Eugene.

=== June ===
- June 5–8 – 2013 NCAA Division I Outdoor Track and Field Championships
- June 8 – Several thousand people participate in the tenth annual Portland World Naked Bike Ride.
- June 11 – Multnomah County mandates that all new county-owned construction projects include some gender-neutral restrooms.
- June 13 – Governor Kitzhaber signs House Bill 2093 into law, removing the surgery requirement that previously barred some people from changing the gender marker on their birth certificates, effective in January 2014.
- June 15 – About 10,000 bumblebees are killed in a pesticide incident in Wilsonville; this is the largest recorded pesticide kill of bumble bees in North America.
- June 25 – The Rave Preservation Project is established in Portland.

=== July ===
Smoke from the Douglas Complex on July 27

- July 14 – Oregon Country Fair
- July 15–21 – 2013 Oregon Challenger
- July 26 – Lightning strikes start several fires that will combine to become the Douglas Complex.

=== August ===
Cessna 172 in Marion Lake

- August 5–14 – 2013 Little League Softball World Series
- August 18 – A Cessna 172 airplane crash lands into Marion Lake. The four people on board swim to land and survive with the help of a Boy Scout troop.
- August 29 – 2013 Portland State Vikings football team: The Vikings win against Eastern Oregon University at Jeld-Wen Field in Portland.

=== September ===
- Unknown day – Susan Monica kills handyman Robert Haney, who she had hired to work on her farm.
- September 5 – The OMSI Omnimax Theatre closes for renovations that will remove the IMAX theatre capability.
- September 10 – Logan Storm, a former teacher at Stoller Middle School, is sentenced to eight years in prison for possession of child pornography.
- September 13 – Two protesters associated with the Cascadia Forest Defenders and "opposed to selling Oregon state forestland" climb the top of the Oregon State Capitol and hang a banner criticizing Governor Kitzhaber.
- September 14 – 2013 Portland State Vikings football team: The Vikings win against Humboldt State at Jeld-Wen Field in Portland.
- September 26 – 2013 Portland State Vikings football team: The Vikings lose against Cal Poly at Jeld-Wen Field in Portland.

=== October ===
- October 1 – An aurora is visible in the sky over parts of Oregon due to a mild geomagnetic storm.
- October 8 – The U.S. Department of Energy releases a report saying that the Bonneville Power Administration has not been giving veterans hiring preference as required by law.
- October 9 – Joe Bell is killed by a semi truck during a cross-country walk to raise awareness of bullying. Bell had begun the walk after the suicide of his son, Jadin Bell.
- October 15 – Two Portland couples file a lawsuit challenging the state's 2004 ban on same-sex marriage.
- October 26 – 2013 Portland State Vikings football team: The Vikings win against North Dakota at Jen-Weld Field in Portland.

=== November ===
- November 2 – 2013 Portland State Vikings football team: The Vikings win against Weber State at Jeld-Wem Field in Portland.
- November 16 – 2013 Portland State Vikings football team: The Vikings lose against Saccramento State at Jeld-Wen Field in Portland.
- November 25 – Students and supporters of the Portland Association of Teachers hold a walkout and rally on the Burnside Bridge to show support for teachers after the union declares a bargaining impasse.

=== December ===
- Unknown date – A "blob" of warm water is detected in the Pacific Ocean off the coast of Oregon.
- December 30 – 2013 Alamo Bowl

== Deaths ==
- February 3 – Jadin Bell (born 1997)
- May 14 – Richard Swanson (soccer enthusiast)
- October 9 – Joe Bell, father of Jadin Bell; killed during an anti-bullying walk that he had begun after Jadin's death
