= 2018 in Oregon =

- Decades: 1990s; 2000s; 2010s; 2020s
- See also: History of Oregon; Historical outline of Oregon; List of years in Oregon; 2018 in the United States

The year 2018 in Oregon involved several major events.

== Politics and government ==
=== Incumbents ===
- Governor: Kate Brown (D)
- Secretary of State:
  - Dennis Richardson (R)

== Events ==
=== Ongoing ===
- 2018–19 Oregon Battle of the Books controversy

=== January ===
- January 2018 Western United States floods
- January 1 – The legal purchasing age for tobacco and vape products increases from 18 to 21.
- January 20 – Thousands gather in cities across the state for the second Women's March.

=== February ===
- February 8 – Senator Jeff Kruse resigns, effective March 15, in reaction to investigative findings that he had displayed "a pattern of unwanted touching and harassment at the Capitol."
- February 15 – A 15-year-old pleads guilty to setting the Eagle Creek Fire, which burned almost 49,000 acres in the Columbia River Gorge in 2017.
- February 15–25 – Portland Jazz Festival
- February 16 – An ethics panel finds that former Governor John Kitzhaber violated ten state laws during his time in office.

=== March ===
- March 16 – Portland-based band The Decemberists releases their eighth album: I'll Be Your Girl.
- March 24 – March for Our Lives Portland

=== April ===
- April 15 – A magnitude 3.1 earthquake strikes about three and a half miles from Silverton.

=== June ===
- June 2 – Daniel Brophy, Portland chef and instructor at the Oregon Culinary Institute, is found dead.
- June 6 – Secretary of State Dennis Richardson announces his recent brain cancer diagnosis.
- June 11 – Portland restaurant OK Omens opens.
- June 17 – Occupy ICE protests begin, with people camping outside the Portland ICE facility.
- June 20
  - Indie game developer Chloe Sagal sets herself on fire as a political protest in downtown Portland. She dies from her injuries later that day.
  - The Portland ICE facility is closed temporarily due to Occupy ICE protests outside the building.
- June 29 – Jason Erik Washington is shot and killed by a Portland State University (PSU) officer while breaking up a fight. The two officers involved are immediately put on leave. This is PSU's first-ever lethal shooting by campus police.

=== July ===
- July 3 – The Portland ICE facility reopens; Occupy ICE protesters continue to camp nearby the building.
- July 4–7 – Waterfront Blues Festival in Portland
- July 10 – President Trump pardons Dwight and Steven Hammond, who had since 2012 been serving sentences related to arson committed on federal property in Oregon.
- July 13–16 – Oregon Country Fair
- July 16 – The Miles Fire breaks out in the Rogue River National Forest.

=== August ===
- August 10 – 2018 Horizon Air Bombardier Q400 incident: Two aircraft from the Oregon National Guard are called to attempt to intercept a stolen plane.
- August 21 – Several cities on the Oregon Coast reach record high daily temperatures.
- August 22 – A magnitude 6.2 earthquake strikes off the coast of Oregon.

=== September ===
- September 10 – The body of hiker Diana Bober is found near the Hunchback Trail in the Mount Hood wilderness area. Bober is the first person known to have been killed by a cougar in the history of the state.
- September 17 – The Salem Reporter begins publishing its first news stories.

=== October ===
- October 1 – Boyd's Coffee shutters operations in Portland, where it was originally founded, and relocates to Texas.
- October 28 – The Miles Fire is 100% contained after 124 days.
- October 29 – Two EF 0 tornadoes touch down in Jefferson and Forest Grove.

=== November ===
- November 6 – General elections are held.
- November 28 – The Klondike Fire is 100% contained.
- November 29 – Lily, an elephant at the Oregon Zoo, dies unexpectedly from a viral infection.

== Deaths ==
- January 22 – Ursula K. Le Guin (born 1929), Portland-based novelist
- June 2 – Daniel Brophy (born 1954), Portland chef and culinary instructor at the Oregon Culinary Institute
- December 18 – Owen M. Panner (born 1924), attorney and jurist
