= 2017 in Oregon =

- Decades: 1990s; 2000s; 2010s; 2020s
- See also: History of Oregon; Historical outline of Oregon; List of years in Oregon; 2017 in the United States

The year 2017 in Oregon involved several major events.

In the spring, the population of pyrosomes off the coast of Oregon peaked, and scientists began studying why their population exploded starting about two years prior. From mid-August to early September, a dead zone spread off the coast of the state, causing crabs and other marine life to suffocate.

== Politics and government ==
=== Incumbents ===
- Governor: Kate Brown (D)
- Secretary of State:
  - Dennis Richardson (R)

== Events ==
=== Ongoing ===
- 2017 Oregon wildfires

=== January ===
- January 6 – The Environmental Protection Agency (EPA) releases its final cleanup plan for the Portland Harbor Superfund Site in the Willamette River.
- January 11 – Governor Kate Brown declares a statewide state of emergency due to a massive regional ice storm.
- January 21 – About 100,000 people attend the Women's March on Portland in protest of U.S. President Donald Trump the day after his inauguration.

=== February ===
- February 4 – Orenco Woods Nature Park opens.
- February 18 – After a 20-year legal dispute over the remains, the Ancient One is given a traditional burial attended by more than 200 people from a coalition of tribes from the Columbia River Plateau.

=== April ===
- April 22 – March for Science Portland

=== May ===
- May 2 – Prism Health opens in Portland.
- May 26 – 2017 Portland train attack

=== June ===
- June 4 – Trump Free Speech Rally
- June 15 – Oregon officials vote to allow a gender-neutral option on state identification documents, becoming the first U.S. state to do so.

=== July ===
- July 1–7 – The annual Rainbow Family Gathering is held in the Malheur National Forest, with about 12,000 people in attendance. Two people die during the events.
- July 12 – The Chetco Bar Fire is reported in the Kamiopsis Wilderness, having been ignited by a lightning strike.
- July 13–16 – The first Portland Queer Comedy Festival is held.

=== August ===
- August 15 – Governor Brown signs the Reproductive Health Equity Act into law, mandating abortion access remain legal and covered by insurance providers in Oregon. It also explicitly ensures access to reproductive healthcare for people of all genders, sexual orientations, and immigration statuses.
- August 21 – The path of a total solar eclipse passes over Oregon.

=== September ===
- September 1 – The Hillcrest Youth Correctional Facility closes after all imprisoned residents are moved to the nearby MacLaren Youth Correctional Facility.
- September 2 – A teenager starts the Eagle Creek Fire while playing with fireworks in the Columbia River Gorge.
- September 5 – Mountainside High School opens in Beaverton.

=== October ===
- October 20 – State Senator Jeff Kruse is stripped of all committee assignments following allegations that he sexually harassed female colleagues and employees at the Capitol.

== Deaths ==
- December 11 – Vera Katz (born 1933), politician
