= 2014 in Oregon =

- Decades: 1990s; 2000s; 2010s; 2020s
- See also: History of Oregon; Historical outline of Oregon; List of years in Oregon; 2014 in the United States

The year 2014 in Oregon involved several major events.

== Politics and government ==
=== Incumbents ===
- Governor: John Kitzhaber (D)
- Secretary of State: Kate Brown (D)

== Events ==
=== January ===
- January 1 – House Bill 2093 comes into effect, making it so that transgender people can change the gender marker on their birth certificate by request; previous requirements related to surgery are repealed.

=== February ===
- February 6–10 – "Snowpocalypse 2014": A winter storm brings snow to western Oregon, shutting down schools and businesses.

=== March ===
- March 1 – Portland police "swarm" the Blue Monk during a show by rapper Illmaculate. Police say they were responding to a call from the fire marshal saying there were too many people in the building, but Illmaculate leaves in protest and says he will not perform in Portland due to police harassment.

=== May ===
- May 19 – Geiger v. Kitzhaber decision
- May 20 – Primary elections are held statewide.

=== June ===
- June 10 – Reynolds High School shooting
- June 13–14 – A lightning storm sparks several wildfires, prompting Governor Kitzhaber to declare a state or emergency.
- June 25 – The Sheridan Sun, a newspaper based in Sheridan, publishes their last issue before closing.

=== July ===
- July 22–27 – 2014 World Junior Championships in Athletics

=== August ===
- August 6 – 2014 MLS All-Star Game
- August 14 – Gender affirming care is added to the Oregon Health Plan (Oregon's Medicaid plans), effective January 2015.

=== October ===
- October 1 – Mohamed Osman Mohamud is sentenced to 30 years in prison for attempting the 2010 Portland car bomb plot.

=== November ===
- November 4 – 2014 Oregon elections
- November 25 – Portland Police officer Bret Barnum is photographed hugging a crying Devonte Hart at a Ferguson protest. The photo goes viral on social media.

=== December ===
- December 4 – Mike Riley, coach of the Oregon State Beavers, resigns to become coach at the University of Nebraska.
- December 12 – Rosemary Anderson High School shooting
- December 14 – Three bronze plaques are stolen from The Grotto in Portland.

== Deaths ==
- November 1 – Brittany Maynard (born 1984), assisted suicide activist
