= 1887 in Oregon =

- Decades: 1860s; 1870s; 1880s; 1890s; 1900s
- See also: History of Oregon; Historical outline of Oregon; List of years in Oregon; 1887 in the United States

The year 1887 in Oregon involved several major events.

The town of Seal Rock was first platted in 1887 by Lydia and James Brassfield.

== Politics and government ==
- Governor:
  - Zenas Ferry Moody (before January 12)
  - Sylvester Pennoyer (after January 12)

== Events ==
- February 21 – The Oregon Legislature passes a law to make Labor Day an official holiday. It is the first U.S. state to do so.
- May 27 – Hells Canyon massacre
- November – The East Oregon Herald is established in Burns.
- Unknown day
  - Benedictine monks establish the Mount Angel Preparatory School in Mount Angel.
  - Construction is completed on a Masonic Temple in Pendleton.
  - Oregon State University's The Valley Library is established in Corvallis.
  - The Portland Cordage Company opens.
  - A post office is established in Dale, Oregon.
  - The Oregon Newspaper Publishers Association is established.
  - A sequoia tree is planted outside Campbell Hall in Monmouth.

== Births ==
- September 5 – Blanch McBride Virgin, the first woman in the U.S. to operate a professional radio station
- October 22 – John Reed (journalist)
