= 2021 in Oregon =

- Decades: 2000s; 2010s; 2020s
- See also: History of Oregon; Historical outline of Oregon; List of years in Oregon; 2021 in the United States

The year 2021 in Oregon involved several major events.

== Politics and government ==
=== Incumbents ===
- Governor: Kate Brown (D)
- Secretary of State: Bev Clarno (R) (until Jan 4); Shemia Fagan (D) (after Jan 4)
- 81st Oregon Legislative Assembly

== Events ==
=== Ongoing ===
- COVID-19 pandemic in Oregon

=== January ===
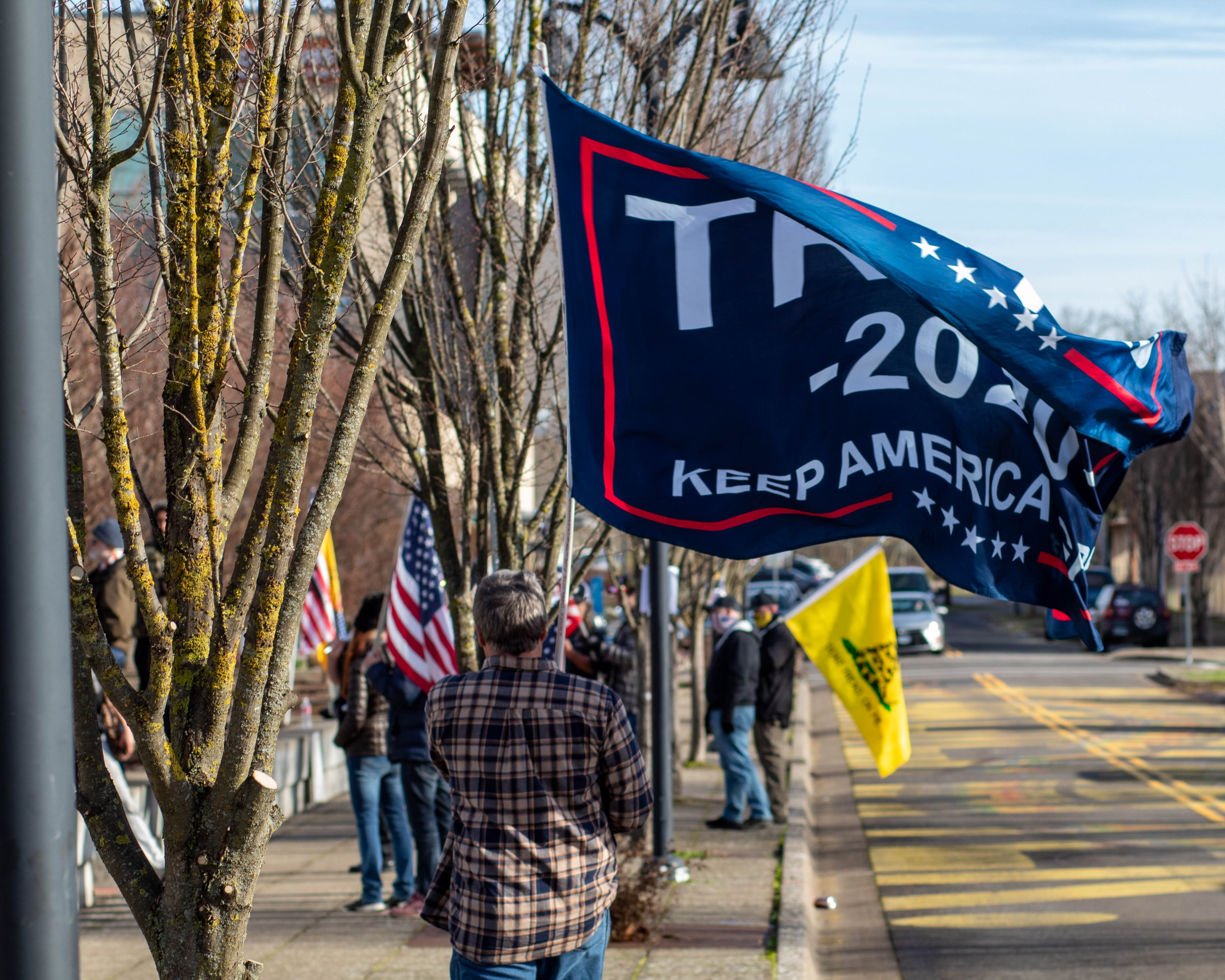
Pro-trump rally in Eugene, January 9, 2021

- January 9 – Three days after the January 6 United States Capitol attack, a pro-Trump rally is held in Eugene. Three people are arrested after violence breaks out between rally attendants and counter-protesters.
- January 17 – COVID-19 pandemic: David James Wadley Jr. becomes the first infant in the state to die from COVID-19.

=== March ===
- March 4–15 – 2021 St. Charles Bend strike

=== April ===
- April 16 – Killing of Robert Delgado
- April 18–23 – Ponina Fire
- April 20 – The Organic Valley creamery in McMinnville catches fire. Most of the building is destroyed, and residents within half a mile of the fire are temporarily evacuated.
- April 26 – The 2021 Oregon Tech strike starts.

=== May ===
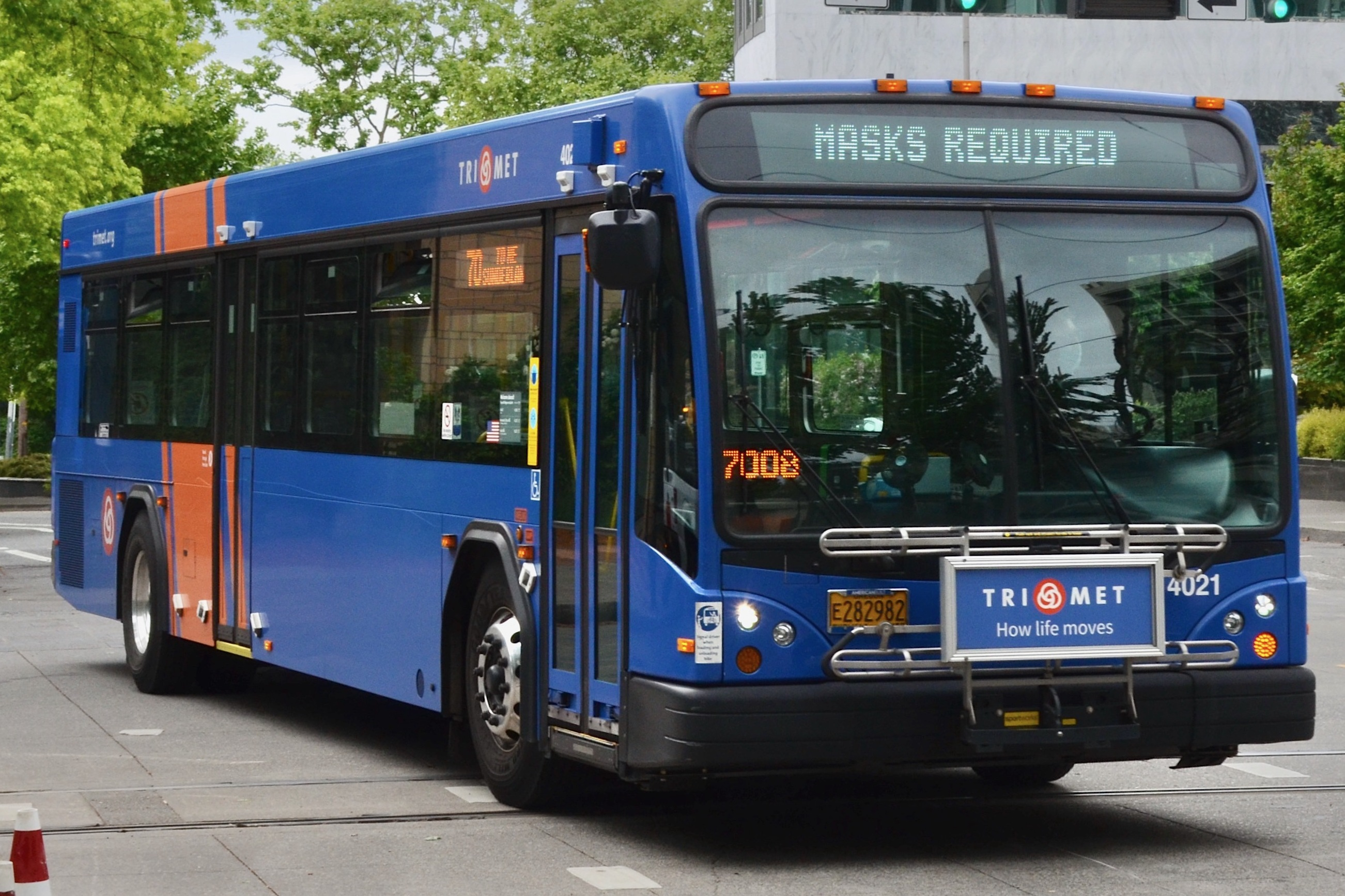
TriMet bus with "Masks Required" signage

- May 15 – The 2021 Oregon wildfire season begins about a month earlier than usual in some parts of Central and Southern Oregon.

=== June ===
- June 7 – The Oregon Legislature approves a resolution to modify the lyrics of the state song, Oregon, My Oregon, to replace language that is seen as racist.
- June 10 – The Oregon House of Representatives expels Mike Nearman for his role in the 2020 Oregon State Capitol breach.

=== July ===
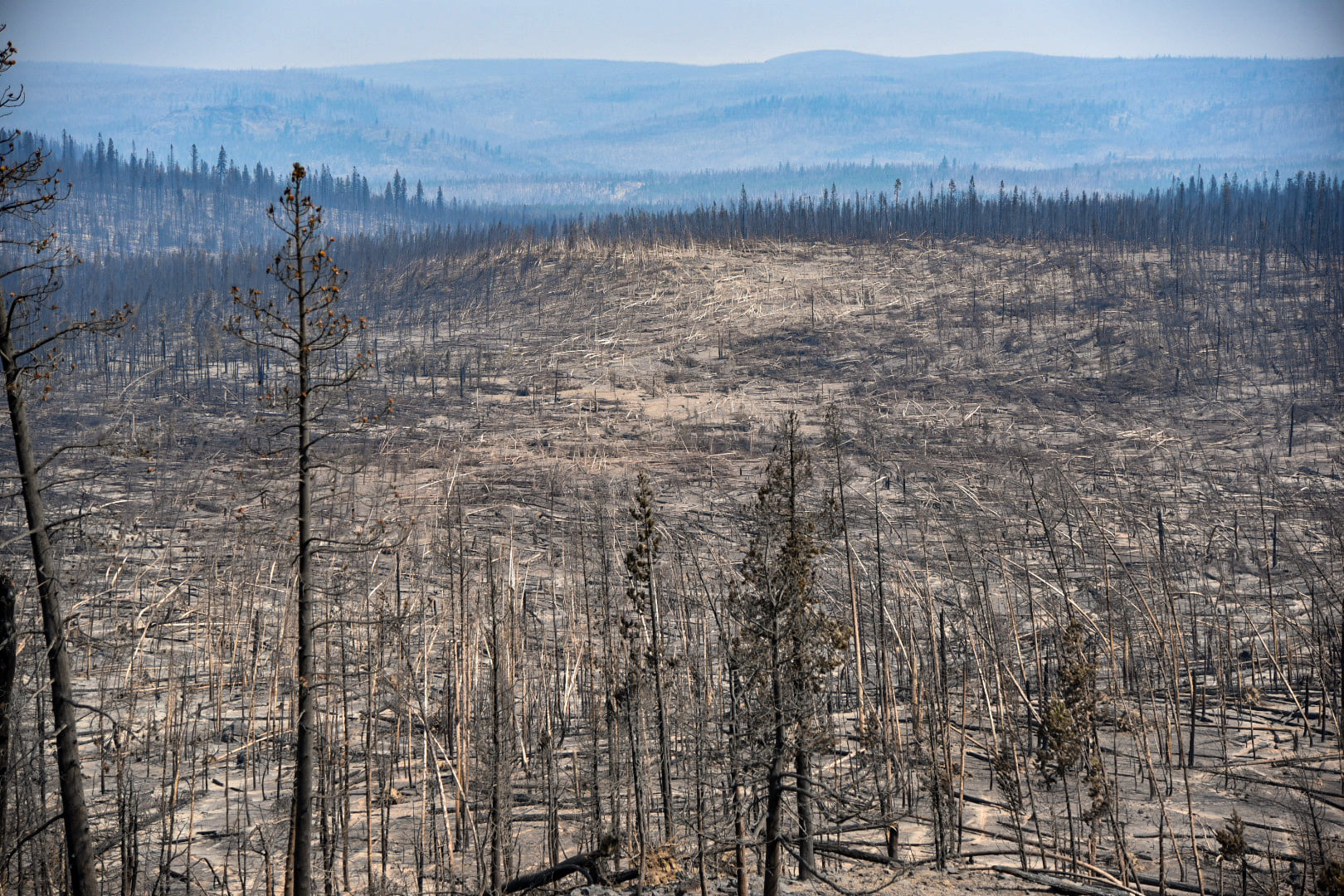
Area burned by the Bootleg Fire

- 2021 Western North America heat wave
- July 6 – The Bootleg Fire starts.

=== August ===
- August 10 – 2021 Nabisco strike
- August 13 – State troopers begin investigating after a dead body is discovered in Rooster Rock State Park.

=== October ===
- October 19 – The October 2021 Northeast Pacific bomb cyclone forms.

=== December ===
- December 9 – An earthquake swarm strikes at the Blanco fracture zone about 300 miles (480 km) off the coast of Oregon.
