= 2016 in Oregon =

- Decades: 1990s; 2000s; 2010s; 2020s
- See also: History of Oregon; Historical outline of Oregon; List of years in Oregon; 2016 in the United States

The year 2016 in Oregon involved several major events.

== Politics and government ==
=== Incumbents ===
- Governor: Kate Brown (D)
- Secretary of State:
  - Dennis Richardson (R)

== Events ==
=== January ===
- January 2 – Occupation of the Malheur National Wildlife Refuge begins

=== February ===
- Multiple dates – Forest Grove Sound
- February 11 – Occupation of the Malheur National Wildlife Refuge ends
- February 16 – The Portland Aquarium closes.

=== March ===
- March 11–12 – 2016 USA Indoor Track and Field Championships
- March 13 – Governor Kate Brown unexpectedly fires State Librarian MaryKay Stahlgreen.
- March 17–20 – 2016 IAAF World Indoor Championships

=== May ===
- May 16 – 4,387 people attend a Donald Trump rally in Eugene.

=== June ===
- June 3 – 2016 Union Pacific oil train fire
- June 19 – Portland Pride Parade

=== July ===
- July 5 – Olan Jermaine Williams Vs. State of Oregon verdict
- July 21 – Conrad, a polar bear at the Oregon Zoo, is euthanized. At 31 years old, he was "the oldest living ursine creature living in a North American zoo or aquarium" prior to his death.
- July 26 – Murder of Kaylee Sawyer
- July 29–31 – Oregon Jamboree

=== August ===
- August 10 – Murder of Larnell Bruce
- August 29 – A group of people destroy the "Duckbill" rock formation at Cape Kiwanda.

=== September ===
- September 18 – The 25th annual Race For the Cure is held in Portland.

=== October ===
- October 14
  - Manzanita tornado
  - Protesters march to, and set up camp at, Portland Mayor Charlie Hales' home to protest forced evictions.
- October 19 – 2016 Portland, Oregon gas explosion

=== November ===
- November 8 – 2016 Oregon elections
- November 10–12 – 2016 Portland, Oregon, riots
- November 14 – Hundreds of students march in an anti-Trump protest in Portland.
- November 18 – Tasul, a polar bear at the Oregon Zoo, is euthanized due to complications of ovarian cancer. This leaves a cub named Nora as the only remaining polar bear at the Oregon Zoo.

=== December ===
- December 14 – A winter storm brings snow and ice, causing massive traffic congestion and power outages in the Willamette Valley, including Portland and Eugene.
- December 19 – An "Electoral Justice" protest against President-elect Donald Trump takes place in Portland.
- December 27 – A magnitude 4.1 earthquake strikes off the coast of Central Oregon.
