= Oregon State Capitol breach =

2020 breach of the Oregon State Capitol

- Part of COVID-19 anti-lockdown protests in the United States
- Date: December 21, 2020; 8:30 a.m. – 3:30 p.m. (UTC-7)
- Location: Oregon State Capitol, Salem, Oregon, U.S. 44.938466°N 123.030374°W
- Caused by: Opposition to COVID-19 mitigation measures

Casualties
- Death: 0
- Injuries: 4+
- Arrested: Four arrested at scene
- Charged: Mike Nearman

On December 21, 2020, a group of protesters demonstrated at the Oregon State Capitol against health restrictions related to the COVID-19 pandemic in Oregon. A security video released in January 2021 showed Representative Mike Nearman allowing armed protesters to enter through a side door, after which Nearman circled the building and entered from the other side. The Oregon House of Representatives voted 59–1 to expel him for his actions. He later pled guilty to first-degree official misconduct.

The protesters included members of the Proud Boys, Patriot Prayer, and supporters of QAnon. One person maced police officers, while others vandalized the building and another assaulted two journalists. At least three of the protesters present at the Oregon State Capitol later participated in the January 6 United States Capitol attack.

== See also ==
- 2021 in Oregon
- Occupy Salem
- United States responses to the COVID-19 pandemic
