= Postal history of Oregon =

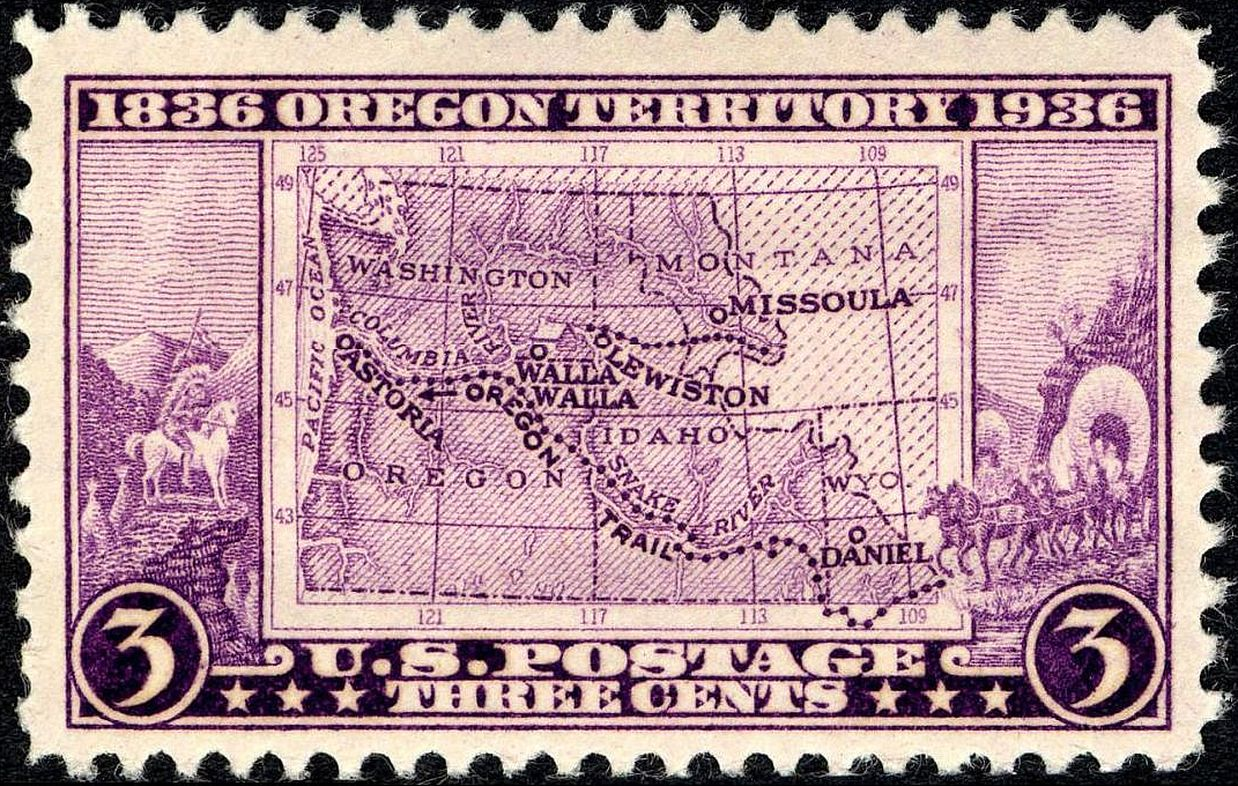
Oregon Territory centennial U.S. stamp, issued in 1936

The postal history of Oregon began in 1847, a year before the Oregon Territory was established, when the United States Post Office contracted delivery of postal items from the east coast of the United States to west coast locations via Panama. Post offices in Astoria and Oregon City were authorized. These were the first offices authorized west of the Rocky Mountains. It was not until 1849 that the Pacific Mail Steamship Company opened routes from Panama along the west coast. The earliest postmarked items from the offices in Astoria and Oregon City were in 1849. There is a significant amount of philatelic information published about Oregon. Oregon Post Offices by Richard W. Helbock provides a list of post offices. Charles A. Whittlesey and Richard W. Helbock have also written Oregon Postmarks, a catalog of postmarks through the 1800s. There is also A Checklist of Oregon Post Offices, 1847-1988 by Helbock. This text provides a more condensed guide to the post offices. The current post office building in Astoria is listed in the National Register of Historic Places.

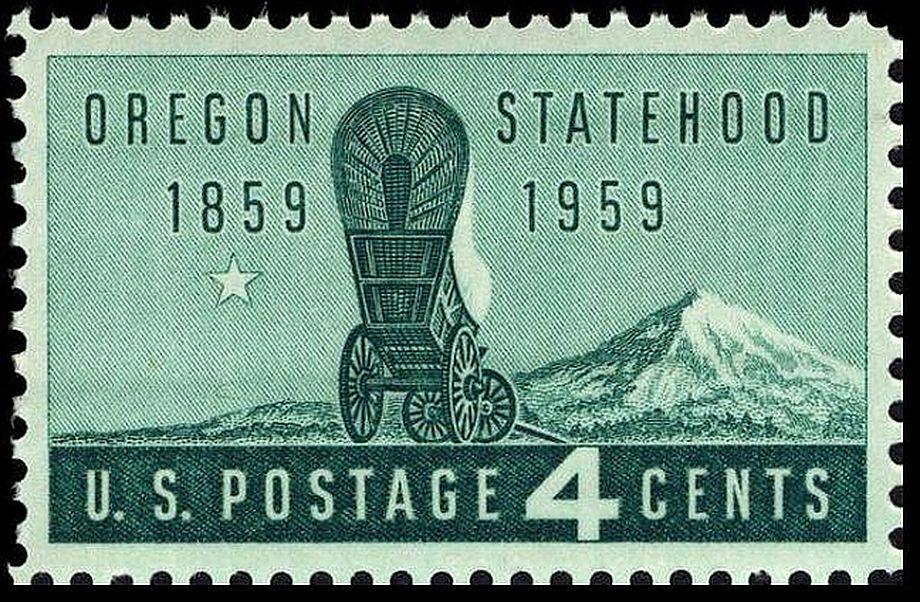
Stamp marking the centennial of Oregon statehood, issued in 1959

== Oregon Territorials ==
The Oregon Territorials are philatelic items originating within the Oregon Territory from the first mails until the establishment of statehood on February 14, 1859. This includes posts from offices north of the Columbia River, prior to the establishment of the Washington Territory in the spring of 1853. When first established, the Oregon Territory included lands of the future states of Washington, Idaho and part of western Montana. Additional office openings followed those in Astoria and Oregon City. In 1849, offices were established in Portland and Salem.

== See also ==
- History of Oregon
- Northwest Philatelic Library
