= Miles Fire =

2018 wildfire in the U.S. state of Oregon

- Part of the 2018 Oregon wildfires
- Date: July 16, 2018 – October 28, 2018
- Location: Rogue River National Forest. Oregon, United States
- Coordinates: 42.848°N 122.711°W

Statistics
- Burned area: 54,334 acres (220 km^{2})

Impacts
- Deaths: None reported
- Injuries: 0
- Structures lost: 1
- Cost: $95.8 million

Ignition
- Cause: Lightning

Map
- The fire's location in Southern Oregon

The Miles Fire was a wildfire in the Rogue River National Forest in Oregon, United States. Caused by lightning, the fire burned a total of 54,334 acres over a span of 104 days.

Caused by lightning, the Miles Fire began on July 16, 2018, and later merged with the Sugar Pine and Umpqua Complex Fires.

According to the Northwest Interagency Coordination Center (NWCC), the Miles Fire was Oregon's most expensive complex to fight in 2018, costing $95.8 million.
