= Rave Preservation Project =

Digital archive of rave and electronic dance music memorabilia

- Formation: June 25, 2013
- Founder: Matthew and Tani Johnson
- Type: Digital library Cultural preservation
- Purpose: Archiving and digitizing underground rave, club, and disco memorabilia
- Headquarters: Southern Oregon, United States
- Region served: Worldwide
- Official language: English
- Website: ravepreservationproject.com

The Rave Preservation Project is a digital archive and preservation initiative dedicated to collecting, curating, and digitizing physical memorabilia from underground rave culture, electronic dance music (EDM), club, and disco scenes. Launched in 2013, it maintains the world's largest online collection of rave flyers, posters, and related ephemera, with over 40,000 digitized items organized into more than 2,400 galleries accessible via its website. As of 2025, the total physical collection exceeds 250,000 items, with a significant backlog awaiting digitization. The project stores items in climate-controlled conditions and operates according to the core rave values of peace, love, unity, and respect (PLUR).

== History ==
The Rave Preservation Project was founded on June 25, 2013, by Matthew and Tani Johnson, a couple originally from the San Francisco Bay Area who had amassed a personal collection of approximately 1,000 rave flyers from the late 1980s and early 1990s. What began as a modest website shared among friends quickly expanded as global enthusiasts donated additional memorabilia, transforming it into a comprehensive archive. By 2015, the collection had grown to over 50,000 items, prompting media coverage from EDM publications. In 2018, it was recognized by Mixmag as the largest rave flyer archive in the world. As of 2025, the project operates from the Johnsons' home in the mountains of Southern Oregon, where Matthew—a retired tech professional and full-time artist—oversees curation, while Tani, a registered nurse, contributes to operations. The initiative remains volunteer-driven, sustained by donations, community support, and a SubscribeStar membership program launched in 2025 to fund full-time curation.

== Collection and activities ==
The project's core activity involves receiving, cleaning, sorting, scanning at high resolution, and archiving donated items such as flyers, posters, laminates, and tickets. Materials are organized by geographic location (e.g., California with 1,577 galleries and 26,506 items; London with 115 galleries and 1,755 items), event type, and alphabetically. All digitized content is freely available online, with email notifications alerting subscribers to new additions. The archive spans global underground scenes, including regions like Australia, Belgium, Canada, and the United States. Notable for its focus on pre-digital era ephemera, it serves as a historical record of rave evolution from the 1980s onward. As of 2025, approximately 250,000 items await curation.

== Initiatives ==
To fund expansion, the project launched the "Directory to the Underground" in mid 2026, allowing electronic musicians to list profiles for a monthly fee across genres including rave, EDM, underground dance music, techno, house, trance, hardcore, jungle, and drum and bass. Revenue supports marketing, social media campaigns, and event sponsorships, with plans for directory expansion, iOS and Android apps to enhance accessibility.

All visitors the project's website has free global access for anyone to browse listings, stream music, podcasts, videos, festivals, clubs/promoters & venues, magazines & blogs, music platforms, DJs/producers/bands, gear suppliers, and R.P.P. Nation (supporters outside the rave/electronic music world). Revenue funds the labor to digitize the approximately 250,000 pieces of donated memorabilia awaiting curation.

Future goals include faster gallery updates and broader collaborations within the electronic music community.

== Reception ==
The Rave Preservation Project has been praised for democratizing access to rave history, with Insomniac Events noting its role in connecting generations of fans. Mixmag highlighted its cultural significance, stating, "Johnson has amassed a collection of over 40,000 pieces of rave memorabilia from the mid-'80s to the mid-'00s." Social media presence on platforms like Instagram and X (formerly Twitter) amplifies its reach, with posts garnering engagement from nostalgia-driven communities.

== See also ==
- Rave culture
- Electronic dance music
- Digital library
- Cultural heritage
