= Starky's =

Defunct gay bar and restaurant in Portland, Oregon, U.S.

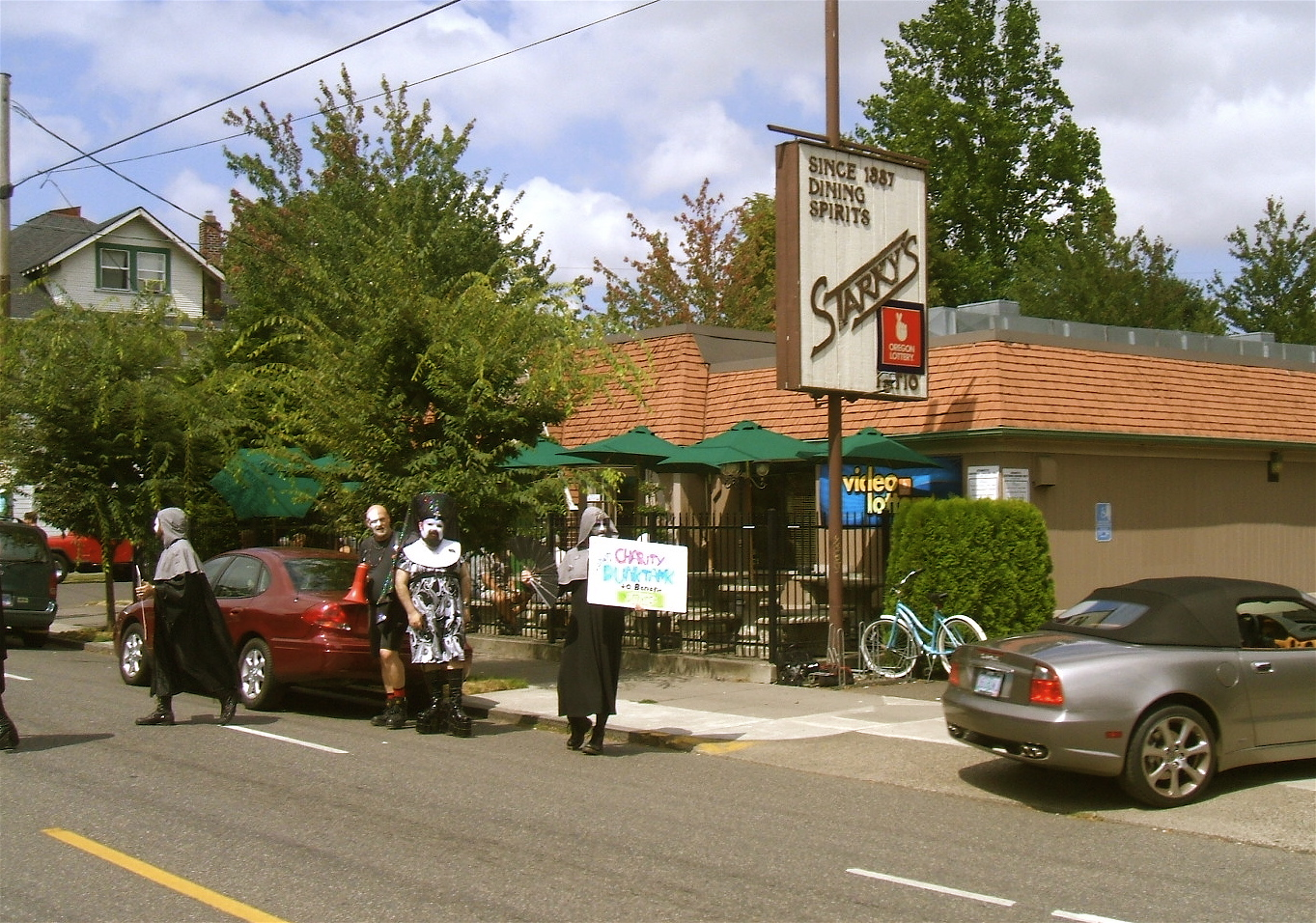
- Sisters of Perpetual Indulgence outside the bar and restaurant in 2009
- Interactive map of Starky's
- Full name: Starky's Restaurant and Bar
- Address: 2913 Southeast Stark Street
- Location: Portland, Oregon, U.S.
- Coordinates: 45.51949°N 122.63570°W
- Type: Gay bar; restaurant

Construction
- Opened: 1984
- Closed: September 13, 2015
- Demolished: November–December 2015

Starky's Restaurant and Bar, or simply Starky's (sometimes stylized as Starkys), was a gay bar and restaurant in Portland, Oregon's Kerns neighborhood, in the United States. Established in 1984, the venue became a fixture in Portland's gay community before closing in 2015. It hosted LGBTQ events and served as a gathering space for leather enthusiasts and the Oregon Bears, among other groups. Starky's received a generally positive reception and was most known for its Bloody Marys, brunch, and outdoor seating.

== Description and history ==
Starky's, located at 2913 Southeast Stark Street, was a gay bar and restaurant in Portland's Kerns neighborhood. It was established in 1984 and housed in a building that was constructed in 1935. Starky's was known for its patio and outdoor seating, in addition to serving American cuisine, including burgers and steak. Joe Waldroff and Greg Simshaw purchased the bar in September 2004.

In 2015, Willamette Week described the establishment as a "patioed mountain chalet with homestyle food that seems as domestic as Grandpa's house, with busy Thursday karaoke, 'bottomless' mimosas at its essential Sunday brunch, and a charmingly dirty-avuncular bartender who seems to have an answer for everything". Following its closure, the newspaper's Matthew Korfage called Starky's a "little mountain chalet" and "friendly little neighborhood bar catering to longtime regulars in the gay community with raucous karaoke, home-style food and a Sunday brunch that offered up bottomless cheap-bubbly mimosas unless you misbehaved".

Beginning in late 2014, Waldroff and Simshaw listed the building and business for sale intermittently, and sold Starky's for $1.2 million in March 2015. The duo planned to retire and expressed a willingness to sell the rights to the name and business. The bar and restaurant closed on September 13, 2015, after operating for 28 years. The building that housed Starky's was demolished during November–December 2015, and was replaced by a three-story apartment building.

=== Events ===
Starky's was a longtime fixture in Portland's gay community. It served as a gathering space for groups such as Blackout Leather Productions, a nonprofit organization and volunteer group of leather enthusiasts in Oregon and southwest Washington, and the Oregon Bears. Historically, Starky's sold tickets to Portland Gay Men's Chorus performances and hosted (or was a starting location for) gay pride events. The venue also hosted special events such as: a 2009 celebration and fundraiser to send eight musicians from the Rose City Gay Freedom Band to perform at Barack Obama's inauguration, a 2013 PQ Monthly press party, Oregon Bears' 2013 car wash fundraiser for Our House and other nonprofits, the Red Dress Party, and "Civic Pride", which was presented by City Club of Portland in June 2014 to commemorate gay pride and LGBT Pride Month. The latter event featured guests from local organizations including: Basic Rights Oregon, CAP Northwest (formerly Cascade AIDS Project), Equity Foundation, GLSEN Oregon, Oregon Gay and Lesbian Law Association, Oregon Safe Schools and Communities Coalition, PFLAG Portland and the PFLAG Black Chapter, Portland Latino Gay Pride, and Rosetown Ramblers.

== Reception ==
Starky's received a generally positive reception and was most known for its Bloody Marys, brunch, and outdoor seating. In 2013, Jaime Dunkle of the Daily Vanguard, Portland State University's student newspaper, included Starky's as one of the top five gay bars and clubs in the city, writing:

For maxing and relaxing: Starky's is the best outdoor gay bar. Word on the street is that they make a killer Bloody Mary and have a yummy brunch menu. They're old school and have been in Portland since 1984. Check it out if you want to get away from the throbbing, meat-market discos.

In 2014, GoLocalPDX contributor Byron Beck included Starky's in his list of Portland's top twelve gay clubs, writing: "Starky's is for those who remember that brunch is best served on Sunday with a Bloody Mary. This true original is more restaurant than bar but that doesn't stop people from coming here for some of the stiffest drinks in town." In 2015, Willamette Week contributors included Starky's in their list of favorite Portland gay bars.
