= Fred Stickel =

- Born: November 18, 1921; Weehawken, New Jersey, U.S.
- Died: September 27, 2015 (aged 93); Portland, Oregon
- Occupation(s): Businessman, publisher

Frederick Augustus Stickel (November 18, 1921 – September 27, 2015) was an American newspaper publisher.

After serving in World War II in the Marine Corps, Fred Stickel started working for the Newhouse newspaper chain in 1951.

He became president of The Oregonian in 1972, and publisher in 1975, and remained active in his position until his retirement on September 18, 2009.

Stickel died on September 27, 2015, at the age of 93.
