= 2015 Oregon wildfires =

Wildfire season in Oregon, United States

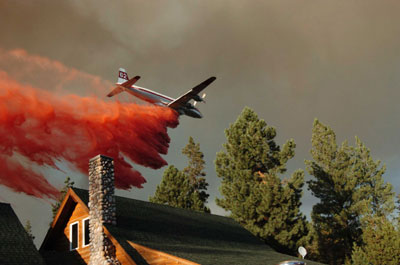
- Air tanker dropping fire retardant on a wildfire in Central Oregon

Statistics
- Total fires: 2,588
- Total area: 685,809 acres (2,775.37 km^{2})

The 2015 Oregon wildfires were an ongoing series of wildfires affecting parts of the U.S. state of Oregon.

== Background ==
"Fire season" in Oregon typically begins in mid-May and ends with the first rains that normally begins in late September. Drought, snowpack levels, and local weather conditions play a role in Oregon's fire season, particularly in Eastern and Southwest Oregon. During peak fire season from July to September, most wildfires are caused by lightning, while ignitions in the early and later parts of the season are related to humans. Warm, dry conditions in summer heighten the wildfire risk. After over 100 years of fire suppression and prevention of all fires, there is now an abundance of fuel. Climate change is leading to a reduced snowpack with an earlier and reduced snowmelt, so there is a higher risk for areas that receive wildfires.

== August fire ==
The August fire was reported on August 22, 2015, 10 miles (16 km) east of Banks. It was fully contained by August 24. It was suspected to be human-caused. One firefighter was injured. Three aircraft were used, taking water from Henry Hagg Lake, which led to its closure for recreational purposes. An estimated 26 acres (11 ha) were part of the burn, and 60 firefighters were needed. Highway 26 was closed for several days.

== Cornet-Windy Ridge fire ==
The Cornet-Windy Ridge fire has burned more than 103,800 acres (42,000 ha) on public forest and private lands a few miles west of Durkee. As of August 23, 2015, the fire was 80 percent contained.

== Eldorado fire ==
The Eldorado fire, which was caused by lightning, has burned more than 20,600 acres (8,300 ha) of land 5 miles (8.0 km) southeast of Unity. As of August 23, 2015, the fire was 65 percent contained.

== Stouts fire ==
The human-caused Stouts fire has burned 26,000 acres 16 miles (26 km) east of Canyonville, just south of Milo. As of August 23, 2015, the wildfire was 83 percent contained.

== Willamina Creek fire ==
The Willamina Creek fire, occurring 9 miles (14 km) north of Willamina, has burned 230 acres (93 ha) in "heavy fuels on high-value timberland owned by the Bureau of Land Management and private industrial forestland owners". As of August 23, 2015, the fire was 20 percent contained.

== Smoke in the Willamette Valley ==
Wildfire smoke from Washington and Oregon was blown west over western Oregon, including Portland and the rest of the Willamette Valley, on August 22–23, 2015.

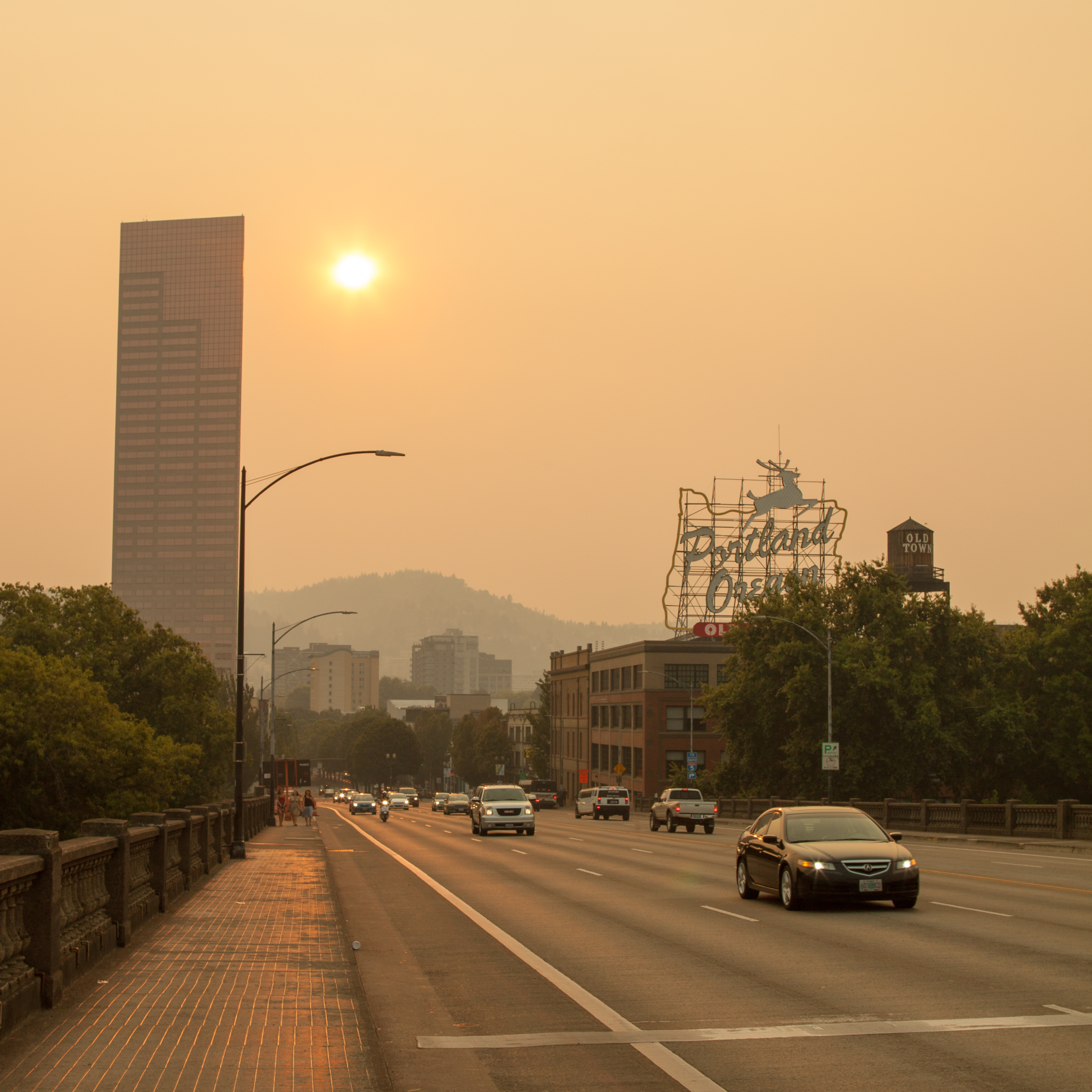
Portland skyline during 2015 Oregon wildfires - seen are the U.S. Bancorp Tower and White Stag sign from the Burnside Bridge

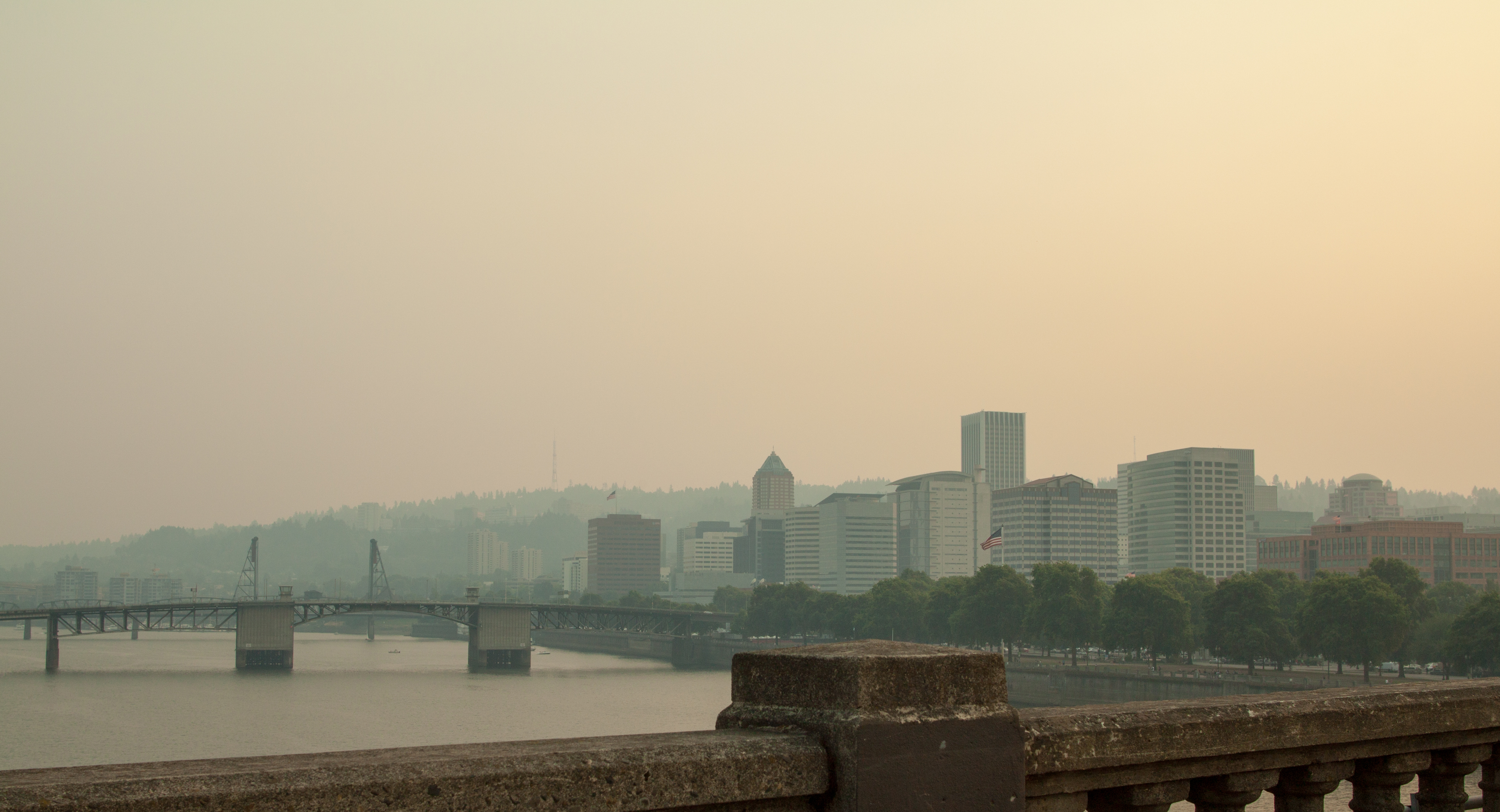
Portland skyline and the Burnside Bridge

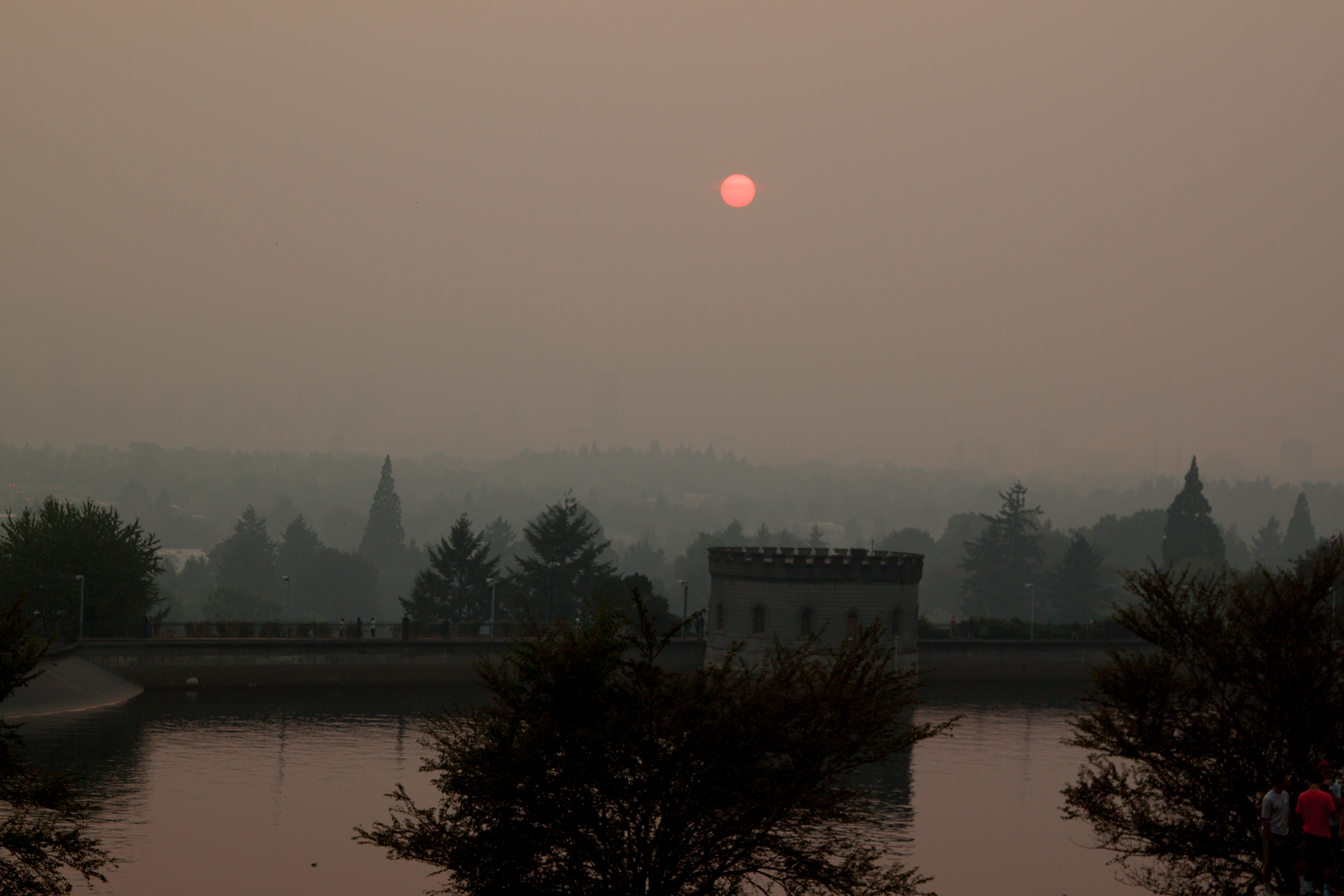
Portland skyline from Mt. Tabor at sunset

== See also ==
- 2015 California wildfires
- 2015 Washington state wildfires
- Oregon wildfires by year
