= Electoral reform in Oregon =

U.S. state electoral reform

Electoral reform in Oregon refers to efforts to change election and voting laws in the West Coast state of Oregon.

== Alternate voting systems ==
There have been many organizations seeking to change Oregon's electoral systems and laws over the years. The Green Party of Oregon wants to change the state's electoral system to allow instant-runoff voting and proportional representation, noting that both are already mentioned in Article 2, Section 16 of the Oregon Constitution. A bill (SB29) to enable instant-runoff voting for local municipalities was introduced in the 2009 session of the Oregon Legislative Assembly, but it died in a Senate committee.

Both the Oregon Progressive Party and Independent Party of Oregon want to transform the Oregon State Legislature from a bicameral legislature to a unicameral legislature like the Nebraska Legislature by abolishing the Oregon State Senate and folding its duties into the Oregon House of Representatives. Historically speaking, the idea of a unicameral legislature in Oregon has been proposed before as William Simon U'Ren also favored the idea of making the Oregon Legislative Assembly unicameral when he sponsored a measure (Ballot Measure 31) in 1912 that would have abolished the Oregon State Senate, but the measure was rejected by voters. The Oregon State Legislature's Public Commission on the Oregon Legislature report also considered a unicameral approach and recommended the state adopt a nonpartisan blanket primary. The Oregon Senate rejected the nonpartisan blanket primary in May 2007 and in November 2008 the majority of Oregon citizens in every county also rejected the blanket primary measure when it was brought to the state ballot in the form of Oregon Ballot Measure 65 (2008).

In 1998, Oregon voters overwhelmingly passed Ballot Measure 60, placed on the ballot by petition, to conduct all future elections as vote-by-mail elections. Oregon became the first U.S. state to conduct all its elections by mail.

The state began to allow electoral fusion after the Oregon Legislative Assembly passed Senate Bill 326 and Governor Ted Kulongoski signed it on July 8, 2009.

== Allocation of electoral votes ==
Currently, Oregon's 7 electoral votes are designated to the candidate winning the statewide popular vote.

=== National Popular Vote Interstate Compact ===
In March 2009, the Oregon House of Representatives passed HB 2588, a bill to join the National Popular Vote Interstate Compact and designate Oregon's electoral votes to the ticket winning the popular vote nationwide. The bill later died in a Senate committee, but lawmakers said they will pursue it again in the 2011 legislative session.

== Campaign finance ==
The Oregon Constitution allows for a broader right to free speech than at the federal level with the Oregon Supreme Court consistently ruling that campaign contribution limits are a violation of free speech and striking down many laws and ballot measures that enacted contribution limits. As a result of these rulings, Oregon is one of the only 6 states that have no campaign contribution limits of any kind.

The most recent attempt to enact campaign contribution limits was Ballot measures 46 and 47 in 2006. Measure 47 passed, but 46 did not, and in the absence of the kind of Constitutional support it would have provided, 47 did not take effect.

Portland, Oregon also has a publicly financed campaign option for its city elections known as Clean Elections.

== Expansion of the electorate ==
Oregon election laws were amended in 2007 by HB 2910 to allow 17-year-olds to pre-register to vote, ensuring they receive a ballot when they turn 18 and thereby increasing their likelihood of voting. There have been proposals for lowering the age threshold by one year to allow 16-year-olds to pre-register.

The state used to allow Election Day voter registration up until 1984, but a 1986 ballot measure in response to Bhagwan Shree Rajneesh's attempt to take over Wasco, County in 1984 by bringing homeless people to their ranch to register them to vote days before an election passed and amended the state constitution to restrict voter registration to 20 calendar days before an election.

The Oregon Legislative Assembly adopted a bill allowing for online voter registration in 2009 and it went into effect in March 2010. State lawmakers further amended the voter registration process in the 2015 legislative session, approving a first-in-the-nation automatic voter registration law.

== See also ==
- Electoral reform in the United States
