= Olan Jermaine Williams Vs. State of Oregon =

2016 court case

Olan Jermaine Williams V. State of Oregon was a 2016 court case in the U.S. state of Oregon. Olan Jermaine Williams, an African American man who holds a master's degree from Howard University and had no criminal record before this account, was accused of orally sodomizing an intoxicated Caucasian man following a party. The court ruled against the defendant (Williams) in a 10-2 non-unanimous verdict. Williams then requested a new trial with the claim that the 14th Amendment Equal Protection Clause was violated. Williams believed he was given an unfair trial due to his race because there was only one African American person on the jury. The court denied Williams a new trial. The conviction was later reversed by the Oregon Supreme Court following Ramos v. Louisiana, and the case was resolved on remand. This case is important because of the controversy that arose following the verdict.

== History ==
Until 2020, Oregon was the only U.S. state that allowed a felony defendant to be convicted by a non-unanimous verdict. The verdict only needed to be 10-2 on the jury to convict, whereas every other state required a unanimous verdict for a felony conviction. The U.S. Supreme Court ended the practice in Ramos v. Louisiana. Many claim that the decision to keep Oregon a non-unanimous court is to continue Oregon's long history with racism; Aliza Kaplan, a professor at Lewis and Clark Law School in Portland, has stated that this law was created for that exact reason, and Multnomah County Circuit Judge Bronson James said the same in a ruling related to this case. James also noted that the law was passed during a surge of Ku Klux Klan membership in Oregon. U.S. Supreme Court Judge Neil Gorsuch later agreed that the law was very likely motivated by racism in his ruling on Ramos v. Louisiana, in which he ruled that felony convictions by a non-unanimous jury are unconstitutional. According to James, Gorsuch, and others, the intent of the decision to make Oregon a non-unanimous court system was to silence the opinions of jurors who are members of racial and ethnic minorities, including African Americans. Some have argued that that is what happened with this case, because there was only one African American woman on the jury and she believed that Williams was innocent, but her opinion did not impact the verdict because she was outvoted. She also explained that during discussion, the other jurors spent the majority of the time trying to convince her to vote against Williams.

== Results ==
On July 5, 2016, at the Multnomah County Courthouse in Portland, Oregon, the jury acquitted Williams of one count of first-degree sodomy and found him guilty of the other by a 10–2 non-unanimous verdict. Williams appealed, and the Oregon Court of Appeals affirmed the conviction in 2019. After the U.S. Supreme Court held in Ramos v. Louisiana (2020) that the Constitution requires unanimous jury verdicts to convict, the Oregon Supreme Court reversed both the Court of Appeals decision and the circuit court judgment and remanded the case for further proceedings. On remand, the first-degree sodomy charge did not result in a conviction; in January 2022, Williams pleaded guilty to a charge of coercion and was sentenced to probation, which was discharged in 2023.

== See also ==
- Hung jury
- Oregon Revised Statutes
- Racism in Oregon

=== Similar cases ===
- Apodaca v. Oregon
- McDonald v. City of Chicago
- Apprendi v. New Jersey
- Blakely v. Washington
