= Abortion in Oregon =

Abortion in Oregon is legal at all stages of pregnancy to birth. The Center for Reproductive Rights classifies Oregon as highly protective of abortion rights.

The number of abortion clinics in Oregon has declined over the years, with sixty in 1982, forty in 1992, and fifteen in 2014. There were 8,231 legal abortions in 2014, and 8,610 in 2015.

== History ==
The parents of Becky Bell worked with the Feminist Majority Foundation in the 1990s, which credited them with helping to turn public opinion against a parental-notification law in Oregon.

=== Legislative history ===
In the late 1960s, Arkansas, California, Colorado, Georgia, Maryland, New Mexico, North Carolina, and Oregon made reforms to their abortion laws, with most of these states providing more detailed medical guidance on when therapeutic abortions could be performed.

In 1962, the American Law Institute published their model penal code, as it applied to abortions, with three circumstances where they believed a physician could justifiably perform an abortion: "If ... there is substantial risk that the continuance of the pregnancy would gravely impair the physical or mental health of the mother, or that the child would be born with grave physical or mental defect, or that the pregnancy resulted from rape, incest, or other felonious intercourse." Versions of this model were passed into law in many states during the late 1960s and early 1970s. Oregon was an exception in that they chose to model their law after the British Abortion Act 1967. State law as of 1971 required that any woman getting a legal abortion in the state needed to be a resident for some specific period between 30 and 90 days.

As of 2017, California, Oregon, Montana, Vermont, and New Hampshire allow qualified non-physician health professionals, such as physician assistants, nurse practitioners, and certified nurse midwives, to do first-trimester aspiration abortions and to prescribe drugs for medical abortions. In Oregon the Reproductive Health Equity Act was passed in 2017, which required health insurance to offer abortion coverage and to absorb most of the costs for the procedure, instead of passing them along to women. As of August 2018, the state had a law to protect the right to have an abortion. As of May 2019, Oregon was one of only a few states in the nation that had no gestational age limit on abortion, and the only one with no restrictions at all.

=== Ballot box history ===
There was a ballot box measure in 2018 that sought to limit the ability of the state to use public funds to pay for abortions. This was rejected by voters.

=== Judicial history ===
The US Supreme Court's decision in 1973's Roe v. Wade ruling meant the state could no longer regulate abortion in the first trimester. However, the Supreme Court overturned Roe v. Wade in Dobbs v. Jackson Women's Health Organization, No. 19-1392, 597 U.S. ___ (2022) later in 2022.

=== Clinic history ===
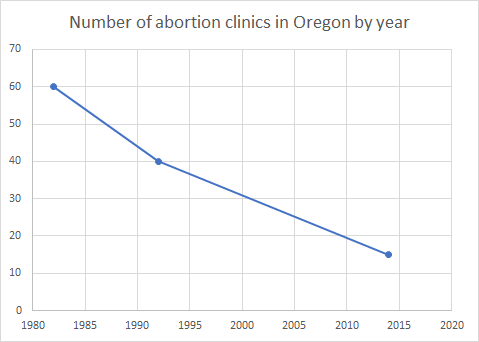
Number of abortion clinics in Oregon by year

Between 1982 and 1992, the number of abortion clinics in the state decreased by twenty, going from sixty in 1982 to forty in 1992. In 2014, there were fifteen abortion clinics in the state. In 2014, 78% of the counties in the state did not have an abortion clinic. That year, 30% of women in the state aged 15–44 lived in a county without an abortion clinic. In 2017, there were 12 Planned Parenthood clinics, of which 8 offered abortion services, in a state with a population of 911,617 women aged 15–49. That year, 30% of women in the state aged 15–44 lived in a county without an abortion clinic.

== Statistics ==
In the period between 1972 and 1974, there were no recorded illegal abortion deaths in the state. In 1990, 332,000 women in the state faced the risk of an unintended pregnancy. In 2013, among white women aged 15–19, there were 760 abortions, 60 abortions for black women aged 15–19, 140 abortions for Hispanic women aged 15–19, and 70 abortions for women of all other races. In 2014, 63% of adults said in a poll by the Pew Research Center that abortion should be legal in all or most cases. The 2023 American Values Atlas reported that, in their most recent survey, 72% of Oregonians said that abortion should be legal in all or most cases. In 2017, the state had an infant mortality rate of 5.4 deaths per 1,000 live births.

Number of reported abortions, abortion rate and percentage change in rate by geographic region and state in 1992, 1995 and 1996
Census division and state	Number			Rate			% change 1992–1996
Census division and state	1992	1995	1996	1992	1995	1996	% change 1992–1996
US Total	1,528,930	1,363,690	1,365,730	25.9	22.9	22.9	–12
Pacific	368,040	290,520	288,190	38.7	30.5	30.1	–22
Alaska	2,370	1,990	2,040	16.5	14.2	14.6	–11
California	304,230	240,240	237,830	42.1	33.4	33	–22
Hawaii	12,190	7,510	6,930	46	29.3	27.3	–41
Oregon	16,060	15,590	15,050	23.9	22.6	21.6	–10
Washington	33,190	25,190	26,340	27.7	20.2	20.9	–24

Number, rate, and ratio of reported abortions, by reporting area of residence and occurrence and by percentage of abortions obtained by out-of-state residents, US CDC estimates
Location	Residence			Occurrence			% obtained by out-of-state residents	Year	Ref
Location	No.	Rate^	Ratio^^	No.	Rate^	Ratio^^	% obtained by out-of-state residents	Year	Ref
Oregon	7,683	9.9	169	8,231	10.6	181	9.6	2014	
Oregon	7,847	10	172	8,610	10.9	189	11.2	2015	
Oregon	8,230	10.3	181	8,942	11.2	196	10.6	2016	
^number of abortions per 1,000 women aged 15–44; ^^number of abortions per 1,000 live births

== Abortion financing ==
Seventeen US states, including Oregon, used their own funds to cover all or most "medically necessary" abortions sought by low-income women under Medicaid, thirteen of which are required by State court orders to do so. In 2010, the state had 3,427 publicly funded abortions, of which none were federally funded, and all were state funded.

== Abortion rights views and activities ==
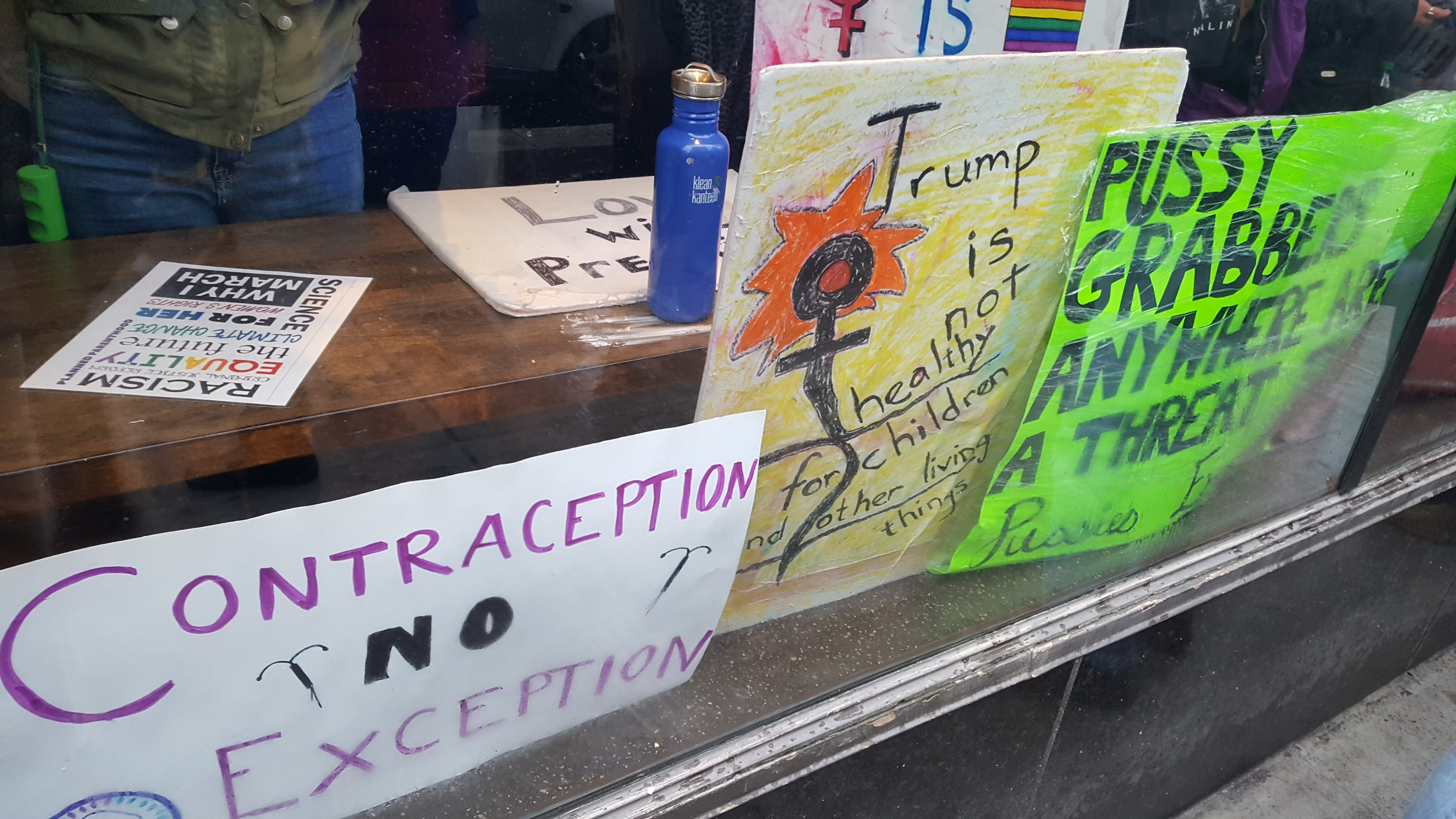
Women's March on Portland 2017

=== Protests ===
Women from the state participated in marches supporting abortion rights as part of a #StoptheBans movement in May 2019.

Following the overturn of Roe v. Wade on June 24, 2022, at least 2,000 abortion rights protesters gathered for a protest in Downtown Portland. 10 people were arrested at a June 24 protest in Eugene.

On November 8, 2024, hundreds attended anti-Trump rallies in Portland.

== Anti-abortion views and activities ==
=== Violence ===
The first clinic arson occurred in Oregon in March 1976 and the first bombing occurred in February 1978 in Ohio. The attack took place at a Planned Parenthood clinic in Eugene and was committed by an individual.

Rachelle "Shelley" Shannon attempted to set fires at abortion clinics in Oregon, California, Idaho and Nevada during the late 1980s and early 1990s and eventually pleaded guilty for these cases of arson. In 1993, she was found guilty of attempted murder of George Tiller in 1993 at his Wichita, Kansas clinic.

On November 23, 2021, Devin Kruse, 27, destroyed several windows and security cameras at a Planned Parenthood in Grants Pass, Oregon. He pleaded guilty to two counts of violating the federal Freedom of Access to Clinic Entrances Act.
