= Long Draw Fire =

2012 wildfire in the U.S. state of Oregon

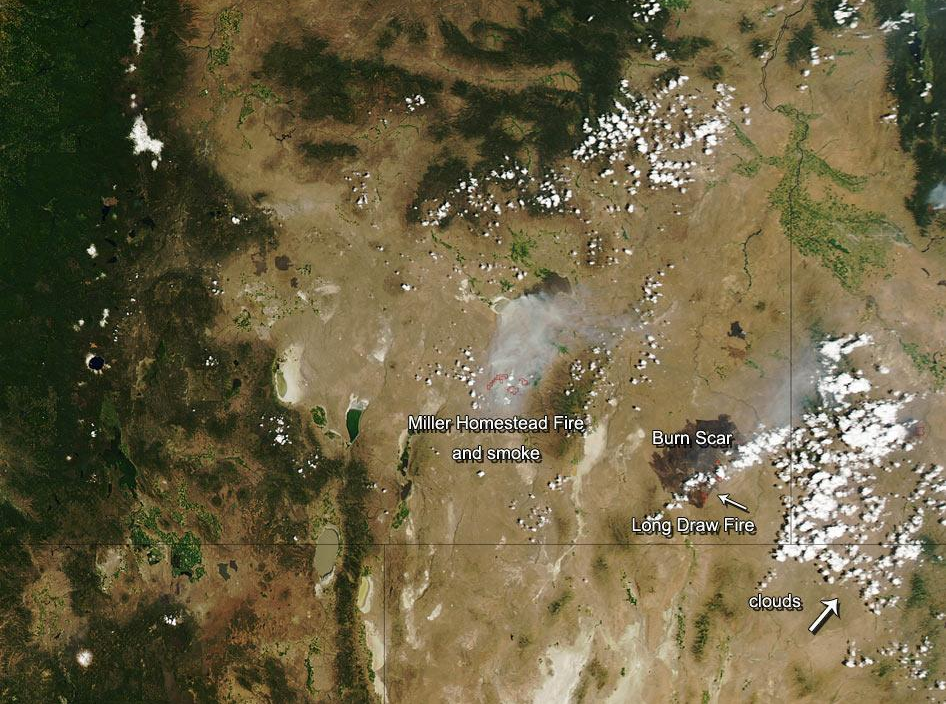
- Date: July 8, 2012 - July 17, 2012
- Location: Oregon
- Coordinates: 42.5°N 117.67°W

Statistics
- Burned area: 557,648 acres (2,257 km^{2})

Ignition
- Cause: Lightning

Map
- Location of fire in Oregon

The Long Draw Fire was a wildfire started by a lightning strike on July 8, 2012 that burned 557,648 acres (2,257 km^{2}) acres in southeastern Oregon, in the Western United States. It was Oregon's largest wildfire since the 1865 Silverton Fire which burned over 1 million acres.

== Fuel Conditions ==
Up until a few years prior to the fire, the area was often saturated by heavy rains which spurred the growth of shrubs and dense snowpack which crushed the foliage and helped it decompose. But because there hadn't been snow, the bushes and grasses remained in an upright position which helped the fire spread more rapidly. Much of the area was covered in sagebrush and native grasses which were unable, due to the dry conditions, to produce the typical seedling coverage witnessed in the past.

== Events ==
The Long Draw Fire was reported on July 8, 2012, at 6:04 PM. It was located north of McDermitt, Nevada. The source of the fire was a lightning strike. During the first night, the fire moved north and ravaged over 30,000 acres and grew to 300,000 acres by the second night. The onset of heavy smoke coupled with the darkness of the night made it unsafe for aerial firefighting operations (helicopters and air tankers) to operate. Thus, the blaze grew rapidly during the nights. Firefighting asset prioritization and supply continued to be a problem during the first few days since there were additional fires in the same geographical area that demanded more resources as well such as the Holloway, Tenmile, Lake Complex and Lava fires. Realizing that additional resources would be slow to arrive, local farmers and ranchers helped create firebreaks. By July 12, the blaze had burned over 500,000 acres, destroyed hundreds of utility poles as well as a Department of Transportation building in Basque.

By July 13, the fire had spread to Owyhee Canyon. The next day, July 14, firefighters reported that cattle had died in the fire. Highway 95 was reopened, too. The fire was 100% contained by July 15.

In all, approximately 500 firefighters fought the blaze, assisted by 6 helicopters, 89 fire engines, 7 bulldozers, 15 water tenders.

The fire was so large that it was visible from space via the Aqua (satellite).

== Aftermath ==
Due to the extensive ecological damage to the fire area and its surroundings, the Bureau of Land Management created the 'Long Draw Fire Emergency Stabilization and Rehabilitation Plan' which was estimated to cost $5.5 million. The plan promoted seeding native foliage, restore habitat and aid in the reduction of erosion. The burn area was also habitat of the Greater sage-grouse an endangered bird species. Thus, special consideration was taken by the Department of the Interior to ensure proper habitat restoration.

== See also ==
- Fire ecology
- Wildfire suppression
- Firefighting
- Wildfires in the United States
- Wildfire
