= Portland World Naked Bike Ride =

Cycling event in Portland, Oregon, U.S.

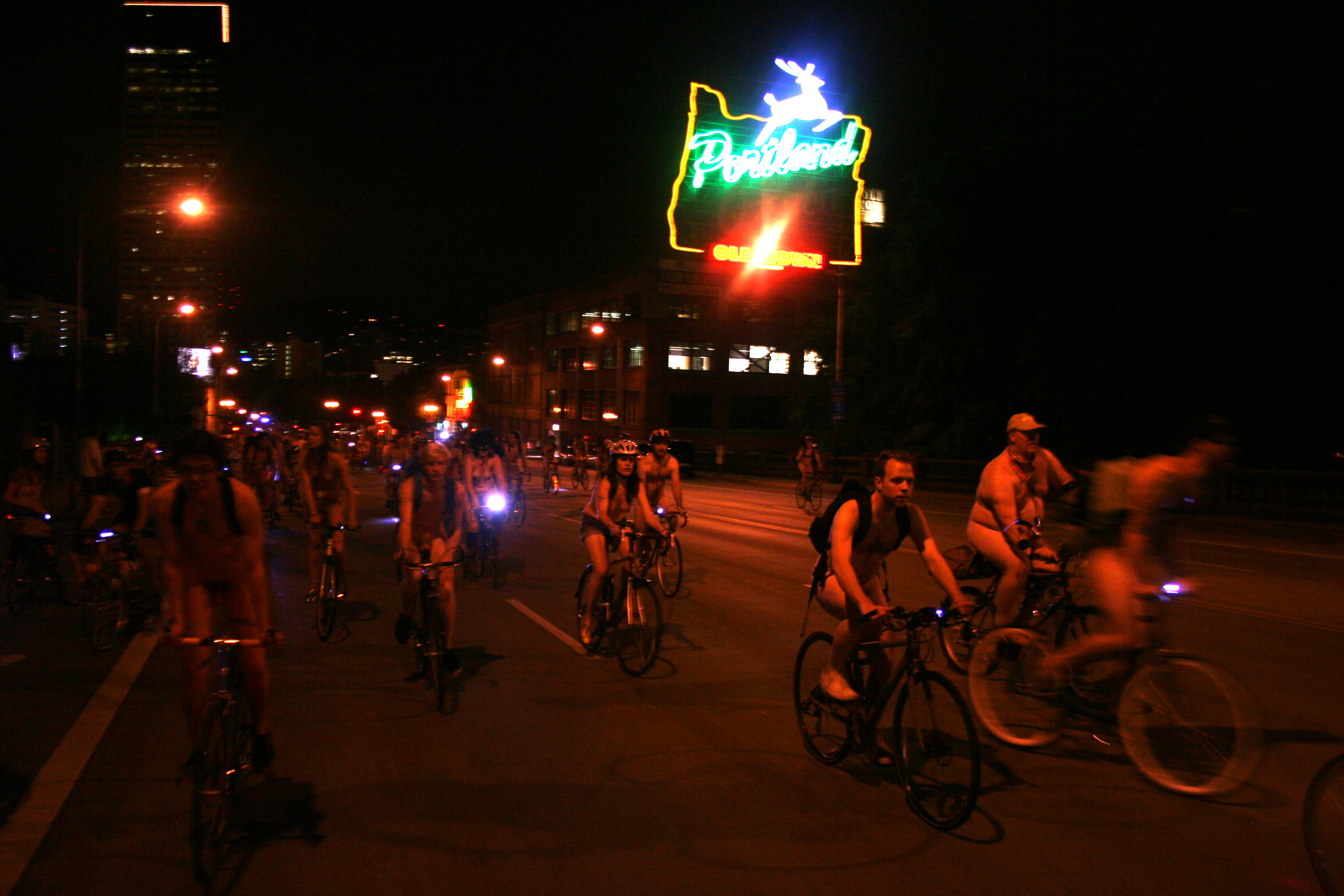
- Event participants in 2012
- Location: Portland, Oregon
- Country: United States
- Years active: 21–22

The Portland World Naked Bike Ride (PWNBR) is an annual World Naked Bike Ride (WNBR) event held in Portland, Oregon, United States. It is the largest iteration of WNBR in the world, averaging approximately 10,000 participants and thousands of spectators. The first PWNBR was held in 2004. Rides are typically held each June.

The event promotes body positivity, discourages car use, and protests fossil fuel dependency. Nudity is encouraged but not required, sometimes described with the pun "bare as you dare." Starting points for the ride have included the South Park Blocks in southwest Portland, Peninsula Park in north Portland, and Colonel Summers Park and Laurelhurst Park in southeast Portland. PWNBR has been described as one of the city's "most colorful traditions", as well as one of Portland's "best-known and most divisive" events.

The 2020 and 2021 events were canceled because of the COVID-19 pandemic. Organizers asked participants to wear face masks for the 2022 event. The 2024 event was canceled to refocus organization efforts. The cancelation prompted some cyclists to have a separate event. Two WNBR events are being organized in Portland in 2025. Grant Park is the starting point for one.

== See also ==
- Nudity and protest
- Clothing-optional bike ride
- Culture of Portland, Oregon
