= Outline of Oregon =

U.S. state

The obverse of the flag of Oregon

The seal of Oregon

The location of the state of Oregon in the United States

The following outline is provided as an overview of and topical guide to the U.S. state of Oregon:

== General reference ==
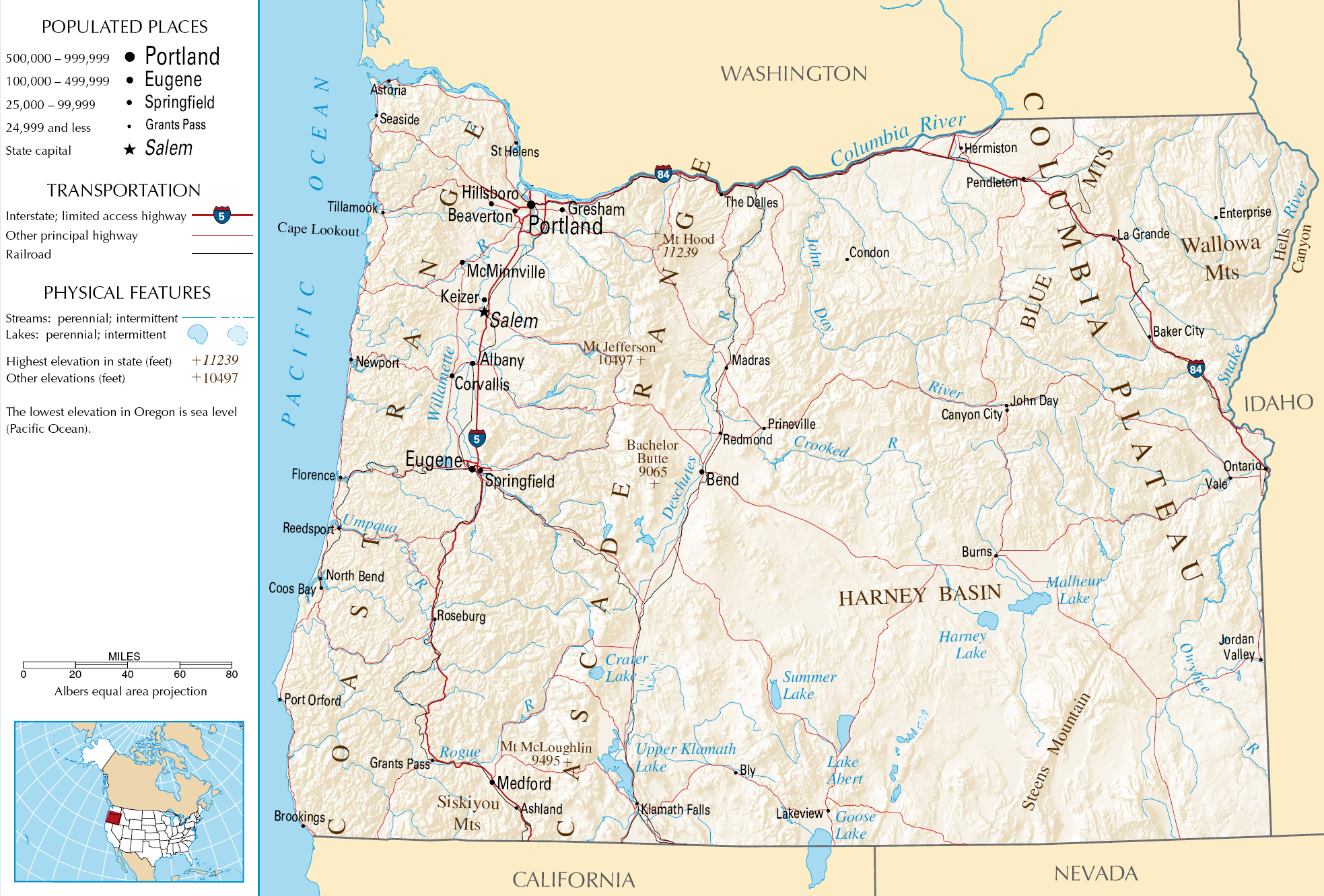
An enlargeable map of the state of Oregon

- Names
  - Common name: Oregon
    - Pronunciation: /ˈɒrɪɡən/ ORR-i-gən
  - Official name: State of Oregon
  - Abbreviations and name codes
    - Postal symbol: OR
    - ISO 3166-2 code: US-OR
    - Internet second-level domain: .or.us
  - Nicknames
    - Beaver State
    - Union State
    - Pacific Wonderland (previously used on license plates)
    - Sunset State
- Adjectivals
  - Oregon
  - Oregonian
- Demonym: Oregonian

== Geography of Oregon ==
Geography of Oregon

- Oregon is: a U.S. state, a federal state of the United States of America
- Location
  - Northern Hemisphere
  - Western Hemisphere
    - Americas
      - North America
        - Anglo America
        - Northern America
          - United States of America
            - Contiguous United States
              - Western United States
                - West Coast of the United States
                - Northwestern United States
          - Pacific Northwest
- Population of Oregon: 3,831,074 (2010 U.S. Census)
- Area of Oregon
  - Total 98,380.64 square miles (254,804.7 km^{2}) (9th)
  - Land: 95,996.79 square miles (248,630.5 km^{2}) (10th)
  - Water: 2,383.85 square miles (6,174.1 km^{2}) (19th)
- Atlas of Oregon

=== Places in Oregon ===
Places in Oregon

- Historic places in Oregon
  - Abandoned communities in Oregon
    - Ghost towns in Oregon
  - Carnegie libraries in Oregon
  - National Historic Landmarks in Oregon
  - National Register of Historic Places listings in Oregon
    - Bridges on the National Register of Historic Places in Oregon
    - National Register of Historic Places listings in Oregon
    - National Register of Historic Places listings in Clackamas County, Oregon
    - National Register of Historic Places listings in Columbia County, Oregon
    - National Register of Historic Places listings in Hood River County, Oregon
    - National Register of Historic Places listings in Jackson County, Oregon
    - National Register of Historic Places listings in Lane County, Oregon
    - National Register of Historic Places listings in Marion County, Oregon
    - National Register of Historic Places listings in Multnomah County, Oregon
    - National Register of Historic Places listings in Wasco County, Oregon
    - National Register of Historic Places listings in Washington County, Oregon
    - National Register of Historic Places listings in North Portland, Oregon
    - National Register of Historic Places listings in Northeast Portland, Oregon
    - National Register of Historic Places listings in Northwest Portland, Oregon
    - National Register of Historic Places listings in Southeast Portland, Oregon
    - National Register of Historic Places listings in Southwest Portland, Oregon
- National Natural Landmarks in Oregon
- State parks in Oregon

=== Environment of Oregon ===
- Climate of Oregon
- Geology of Oregon
- Protected areas in Oregon
  - State forests of Oregon
- Superfund sites in Oregon
- Wildlife of Oregon
  - Flora of Oregon
  - Fauna of Oregon
    - Birds of Oregon
    - Amphibians and reptiles of Oregon

==== Natural geographic features of Oregon ====
- Beaches of Oregon
- Lakes of Oregon
- Mountains of Oregon
- Rivers of Oregon

=== Regions of Oregon ===
Regions of Oregon

- Central Oregon
- Eastern Oregon
- Southern Oregon
- Southeastern Oregon
- Western Oregon
- Oregon Coast

==== Administrative divisions of Oregon ====
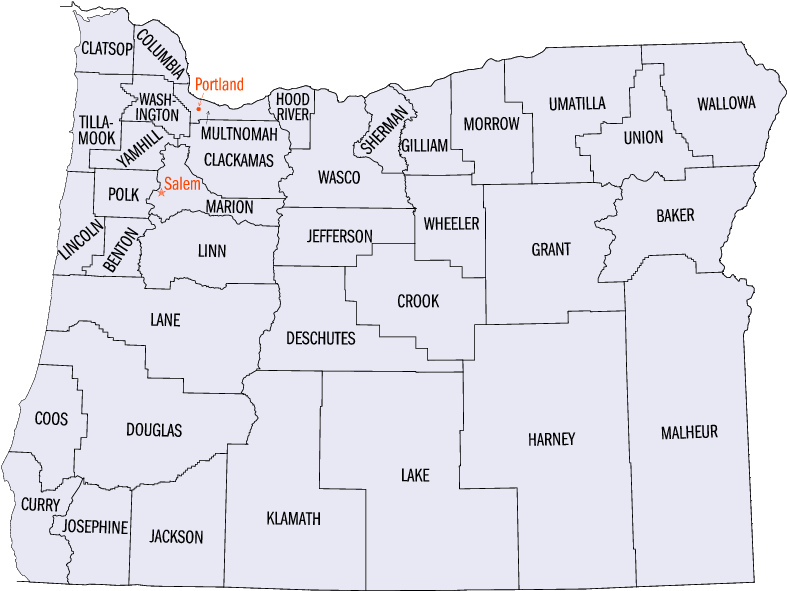
An enlargeable map of the 36 counties of the state of Oregon

- The 36 counties of the state of Oregon
  - Cities in Oregon
    - State capital of Oregon: Salem
    - Largest city in Oregon: Portland (23rd most populous city in the United States as of July 2006.)
    - City nicknames in Oregon
  - Unincorporated communities in Oregon
  - Census-designated places in Oregon

=== Demography of Oregon ===
Demographics of Oregon

== Government and politics of Oregon ==
Politics of Oregon

- Form of government: U.S. state government
- Oregon's congressional delegations
- Oregon State Capitol
- Elections in Oregon
  - Electoral reform in Oregon
- Political party strength in Oregon

=== Branches of the government of Oregon ===
Government of Oregon

==== Executive branch of the government of Oregon ====
- Governor of Oregon
  - Lieutenant Governor of Oregon
  - Secretary of State of Oregon
  - State Treasurer of Oregon
- State departments
  - Oregon Department of Transportation

==== Legislative branch of the government of Oregon ====
- Oregon Legislative Assembly (bicameral)
  - Upper house: Oregon Senate
  - Lower house: Oregon House of Representatives

==== Judicial branch of the government of Oregon ====
Courts of Oregon

- Supreme Court of Oregon

=== Law and order in Oregon ===
Law of Oregon

- Adoption in Oregon
- Cannabis in Oregon
- Capital punishment in Oregon
  - Individuals executed in Oregon
- Constitution of Oregon
- Crime in Oregon
- Gun laws in Oregon
- Law enforcement in Oregon
  - Law enforcement agencies in Oregon
    - Oregon State Police
- Same-sex marriage in Oregon

=== Military in Oregon ===
- Oregon Air National Guard
- Oregon Army National Guard

== History of Oregon ==
- History of Oregon
- Timeline of Oregon history

=== History of Oregon, by period ===
- Prehistory of Oregon
  - Kennewick Man
  - Marmes Rockshelter
  - Paisley Caves
- Indigenous peoples
- Early European exploration, 1565–1818
  - Juan José Pérez Hernández's northern voyage, 1774
  - Robert Gray explores and names the Columbia River, 1792
  - William Robert Broughton's voyage to the Columbia River Gorge, 1792
  - Lewis and Clark Expedition, 1804–1806
  - Astor Expedition, 1810–1812
- Oregon pioneer history, 1810–1859
  - Fort Astoria, 1811–1848
  - Overton Johnson and William Winter expedition, 1843: Johnson, Overton; Winter, William H. (1846). Route across the Rocky Mountains with a Description of Oregon and California . reproduced in the Oregon Historical Quarterly, 1906.
- Oregon Country, 1818–1846
  - Anglo-American Convention of 1818
  - Oregon boundary dispute, 1824–1846
  - Oregon missionaries, 1834–1846
  - Provisional Government of Oregon, 1843–1848
  - Oregon Treaty of 1846
- Unorganized territory of the United States, 1846–1848
  - Mexican–American War, April 25, 1846 – February 2, 1848
    - Treaty of Guadalupe Hidalgo, February 2, 1848
  - Cayuse War, 1847–1855
- Territory of Oregon, 1848–1859
  - State of Deseret (extralegal), 1849–1850
  - Anti-Chinese violence in Oregon
  - Rogue River Wars, 1855–1856
- State of Oregon becomes 33rd state admitted to the United States of America on February 14, 1859
  - American Civil War, April 12, 1861 – May 13, 1865
    - Oregon in the American Civil War
  - Nez Perce War, 1877
  - Spanish–American War, April 25 – August 12, 1898
  - Crater Lake National Park established on May 22, 1902
  - Bonneville Dam completed, 1937
  - Mount Saint Helens eruption of 1980

=== History of Oregon, by region ===
- By city
  - History of Eugene, Oregon
  - History of Portland, Oregon
  - History of Salem, Oregon
- By county
  - History of Baker County, Oregon
  - History of Benton County, Oregon
  - History of Clackamas County, Oregon
  - History of Clatsop County, Oregon
  - History of Columbia County, Oregon
  - History of Coos County, Oregon
  - History of Crook County, Oregon
  - History of Deschutes County, Oregon
  - History of Douglas County, Oregon
  - History of Gilliam County, Oregon
  - History of Grant County, Oregon
  - History of Harney County, Oregon
  - History of Hood River County, Oregon
  - History of Jackson County, Oregon
  - History of Jefferson County, Oregon
  - History of Josephine County, Oregon
  - History of Klamath County, Oregon
  - History of Lake County, Oregon
  - History of Lane County, Oregon
  - History of Lincoln County, Oregon
  - History of Linn County, Oregon
  - History of Malheur County, Oregon
  - History of Marion County, Oregon
  - History of Multnomah County, Oregon
  - History of Polk County, Oregon
  - History of Sherman County, Oregon
  - History of Tillamook County, Oregon
  - History of Umatilla County, Oregon
  - History of Union County, Oregon
  - History of Wallowa County, Oregon
  - History of Wasco County, Oregon
  - History of Washington County, Oregon
  - History of Wheeler County, Oregon
  - History of Yamhill County, Oregon

=== History of Oregon, by subject ===
- History of baseball in Portland, Oregon
- History of Oregon State University
  - History of Oregon State Beavers football
- History of rail in Oregon
- History of Oregon wine production
- Territorial evolution of Oregon

== Culture of Oregon ==
Culture of Oregon

- Museums in Oregon
- Religion in Oregon
  - The Church of Jesus Christ of Latter-day Saints in Oregon
  - Episcopal Diocese of Oregon
- Scouting in Oregon
- State symbols of Oregon
  - Flag of the state of Oregon
  - Seal of the state of Oregon

=== The arts in Oregon ===
- Music of Oregon

=== Sports in Oregon ===
Sports in Oregon

== Economy and infrastructure of Oregon ==
Economy of Oregon

- Communications in Oregon
  - Newspapers in Oregon
  - Radio stations in Oregon
  - Television stations in Oregon
- Energy in Oregon
  - Power stations in Oregon
  - Solar power in Oregon
  - Wind power in Oregon
- Health care in Oregon
  - Hospitals in Oregon
- Transport in Oregon
  - Airports in Oregon
  - Rail transport in Oregon
  - Roads in Oregon
    - State highways in Oregon

== Education in Oregon ==
Education in Oregon

- Schools in Oregon
  - School districts in Oregon
    - High schools in Oregon
  - Colleges and universities in Oregon
    - Oregon State University
      - Oregon State University Cascades Campus
      - Oregon State University College of Engineering
      - Oregon State University College of Science
      - Oregon State University Extended Campus
      - Oregon State University Foundation
      - Oregon State University Historic District
      - Oregon State University Marching Band
      - Oregon State University Press
      - Oregon State University Radiation Center
    - University of Oregon
      - University of Oregon Bookstore
      - University of Oregon Department of Public Safety
      - University of Oregon Museum of Natural and Cultural History
      - University of Oregon Press
      - University of Oregon School of Architecture and Allied Arts
      - University of Oregon School of Journalism and Communication
      - University of Oregon School of Law
      - University of Oregon media
    - University of Portland

== See also ==
- Topic overview:
  - Oregon
  - Index of Oregon-related articles
