= History of Oregon =

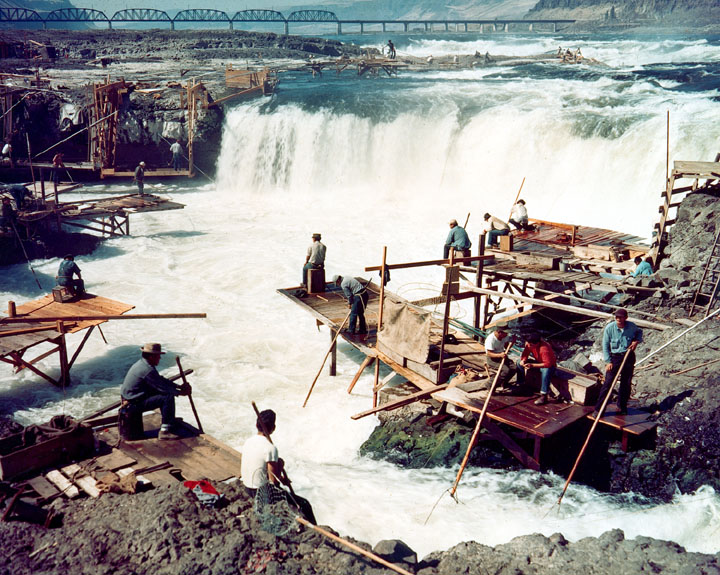
The construction of dams, like The Dalles Dam, was central to the power supply of the region

The history of Oregon, a U.S. state, may be considered in five eras: geologic history, inhabitation by native peoples, early exploration by Europeans (primarily fur traders), settlement by pioneers, and modern development.

The term "Oregon" may refer to:

- Oregon Country (1818–1846), a large region in the Pacific Northwest and western North America explored, settled and temporarily jointly occupied by both Americans and the British (and generally known to Canadians as the Columbia District, prior to the formation of the Colony of British Columbia later becoming a western province in the Canadian Confederation in 1867 of the Dominion of Canada;
- Oregon Territory (1848-1853/1859), established by the United States Congress and approved by the President, two years after its sovereignty over the southern portion of the region was established by the Oregon Treaty of June 1846, splitting the earlier Oregon Country with the northern portion going to Great Britain / future Canada. The northern and eastern portions were separated in 1853, becoming the new Washington Territory (up to its 42nd statehood as Washington state in 1889), and subsequently the eastern portion also separated a decade later becoming the Idaho Territory (1863–1890),then becoming the 43rd state of Idaho in 1890.
- Oregon, a current U.S. state since the previous Oregon Territory (1848–1859) with its admission to the federal Union as the 33rd state in February 1859

The history of Oregon, and of the Pacific Northwest region, has received relatively less attention from historians, as compared to other regions of the American far west.

== Geology ==
Mount Mazama erupted several millennia BC, leading to the formation of Crater Lake.

Volcanic activity in the region has been traced to 40 million years ago, in the Eocene era, forming much of the region's landscape. In the Pleistocene era (the last ice age, two million to 700,000 years ago), the Columbia River broke through Cascade Range, forming the Columbia River Gorge.

The Columbia River and its drainage basin experienced some of the world's greatest known floods toward the end of the last ice age. The periodic rupturing of ice dams at Glacial Lake Missoula resulted in discharge rates ten times the combined flow of all the rivers of the world, as many as forty times over a thousand-year period.

Water levels during the Missoula Floods have been estimated at 1,250 feet (380 m) at the Wallula Gap (in present-day Washington), 830 feet (250 m) at Bonneville Dam, and 400 feet (120 m) over current day Portland, Oregon. The floods' periodic inundation of the lower Columbia River Plateau deposited rich lake sediments, establishing the fertility that supports extensive agriculture in the modern era. They also formed many unusual geological features, such as the channeled scablands of eastern Washington.

Mount Mazama, once the tallest mountain in the region at 11,000 feet, had a massive volcanic eruption approximately 5677 B.C. The eruption, estimated to have been 42 times more powerful than the 1980 eruption of Mount St. Helens, reduced Mazama's approximate 11,000-foot (3,400 m) height by around half a mile (about 1 km) when much of the volcano fell into the volcano's partially emptied neck and magma chamber. Mazama's collapsed caldera, in today's southern Oregon, contains Crater Lake, and the entire mountain is located in Crater Lake National Park.

The Klamath Native Americans of the area thought that the mountain was inhabited by Llao, their god of the underworld. After the mountain destroyed itself the Klamaths recounted the events as a great battle between Llao and his rival Skell, their sky god.

The 1700 Cascadia earthquake resulted from a rupture at the Cascadia subduction zone along the coast of the Pacific Northwest. The earthquake caused a tsunami that was destructive in Japan; it may also be linked to the Bonneville Slide, in which a large part of Washington's Table Mountain collapsed into the Columbia River Gorge, damming the river and forming the Bridge of the Gods, a land bridge remembered in the oral history of local Native Americans.

Celilo Falls, a series of rapids on the Columbia River just upstream of present-day The Dalles, Oregon, was a fishing site for natives for several millennia. Native people traveled to Celilo Village from all over the Pacific Northwest and beyond to trade. The rapids were submerged in 1957 with the construction of The Dalles Dam.

In 1980, Mount St. Helens in nearby Washington erupted violently, temporarily reducing the Columbia River's depth to as little as 13 feet, and disrupting Portland's economy. The eruption deposited ash as far into Oregon as Bend.

== Native people ==
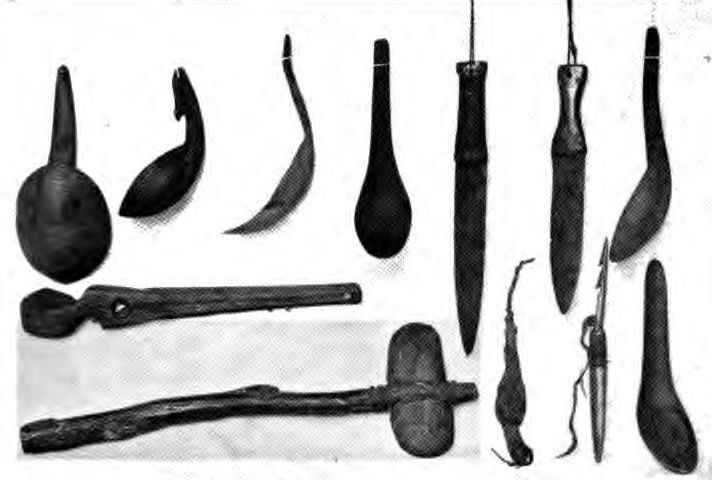
Unspecified artifacts of Native Americans (from a History of Oregon published in 1922)

=== Paleo-Indians ===
Although there is considerable evidence that Paleo-Indians lived in the Pacific Northwest 15,000 years ago, the first record of human activity within the boundaries of present-day Oregon came from archaeologist Luther Cressman's 1938 discovery of sage bark sandals near Fort Rock Cave that places human habitation in Oregon as early as 13,200 years ago. Cressman found more evidence of early human activity at Paisley Caves, north of Paisley, Oregon, caves where researchers affiliated with the University of Oregon have conducted new excavations during the 21st century. By 8000 B.C. there were settlements across the state, with the majority concentrated along the lower Columbia River, in the western valleys, and around coastal estuaries.

By the 16th century, Oregon was home to many Native American groups, including the Bannock, Chasta, Chinook, Kalapuya, Klamath, Molalla, Nez Perce, Takelma, and Umpqua.

The Native people generally welcomed the arrival of Europeans in the 19th century, for the increased trading opportunities; however, the introduction of foreign diseases would prove devastating to local populations. Later, American initiatives to capture the natural resources of the west, especially along the Columbia River, would collide with the interests of native people; many tribes accepted multimillion-dollar settlements from the U.S. government in exchange for giving up traditional fishing sites and moving to reservations.

== Early European exploration ==
The perception of Oregon by early European explorers and settlers varied according to the purpose and method of exploration. Official explorers came, at first, primarily by sea, in many cases seeking the Northwest Passage. Later, the explorers came over land, but missed many areas of the state now known as Oregon. Fur traders and trappers, initially from the Hudson's Bay Company, explored the land more thoroughly, documenting encounters with most of the local Indian tribes. Christian missionaries, and later immigrants planning to settle permanently in Oregon, sent glowing reports back to their families in the east.

The Spanish exploration team led by Juan Rodríguez Cabrillo sighted southern Oregon off the Pacific coast in 1543. In 1592, Juan de Fuca undertook detailed mapping and studies of ocean currents. Stops along these trips included Oregon as well as the strait now bearing his name. Exploration was retaken routinely in 1774, starting by the expedition of frigate Santiago by Juan José Pérez Hernández (see Spanish expeditions to the Pacific Northwest). Soon the coast of Oregon became a valuable trading route to Asia.

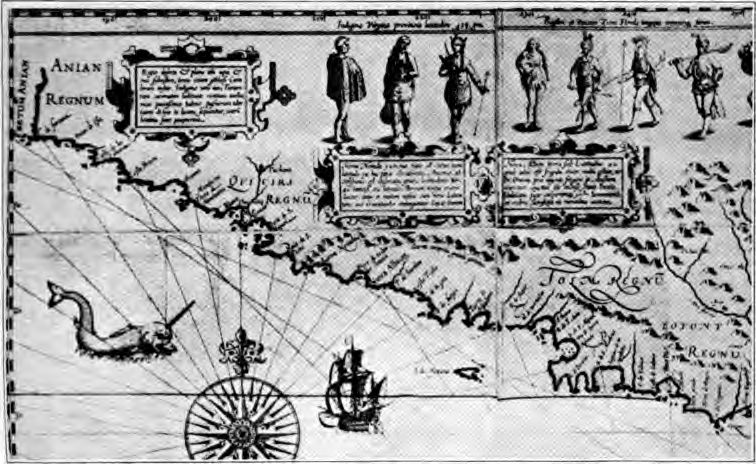
1601 AD map showing unexplored Oregon Coast

Spanish explorers found a way to explore the Pacific coast as early as 1565, sending vessels northeast from the Philippines, riding the Kuroshio Current in a sweeping circular route across the northern part of the Pacific. These ships – 250 in as many years – would typically not land before reaching Cape Mendocino in California, but some landed or wrecked in what is now Oregon. Nehalem Indian tales recount strangers and the discovery of items like chunks of beeswax and a lidded silver vase, likely connected, to the 1707 wreck of the San Francisco Xavier.

Juan Pérez explored the coast of the Pacific Northwest north to British Columbia in 1774. He was the first European to see Yaquina Head on the Oregon Coast. In 1775 another Spanish expedition, under Juan Francisco de la Bodega y Quadra and Bruno de Heceta, explored the coast. While returning south Heceta found the mouth of the Columbia River, but was unable to enter.

British explorer James Cook explored the Oregon Coast in 1778 in search of the Northwest Passage. Beginning in the late 1780s many ships from Britain, America, and other countries sailed to the Pacific Northwest to engage in the region's emerging Maritime Fur Trade business. American sea captain Robert Gray entered Tillamook Bay in 1788 and later explored the mouth of the Columbia in 1792. Gray was soon followed by a ship under the command of George Vancouver, a British captain, who also explored Puget Sound and claimed it for Britain.

The Lewis and Clark Expedition traveled through the region during their expedition to explore the Louisiana Purchase. They built their winter fort at Fort Clatsop, near the mouth of the Columbia. Exploration by Lewis and Clark (1805–1806) and the United Kingdom's David Thompson, who extensively explored the Columbia River from 1807 to 1811, publicized the abundance of fur-bearing animals in the area.

== Oregon boundary dispute ==
Great Britain and the U.S. both claimed ownership of Oregon, ignoring any claims by indigenous peoples to their territories. The dispute, friendly at first, escalated into the threat of war before it was resolved amicably in 1846 by splitting the region 50-50.

Following the Anglo American Treaty of 1818, the region was "jointly occupied" by the U.S. and Britain. The Americans referred to the region as Oregon Country, while the British knew it as the Hudson's Bay Company's Columbia District, which was administered from Fort Vancouver near present-day Vancouver, Washington.

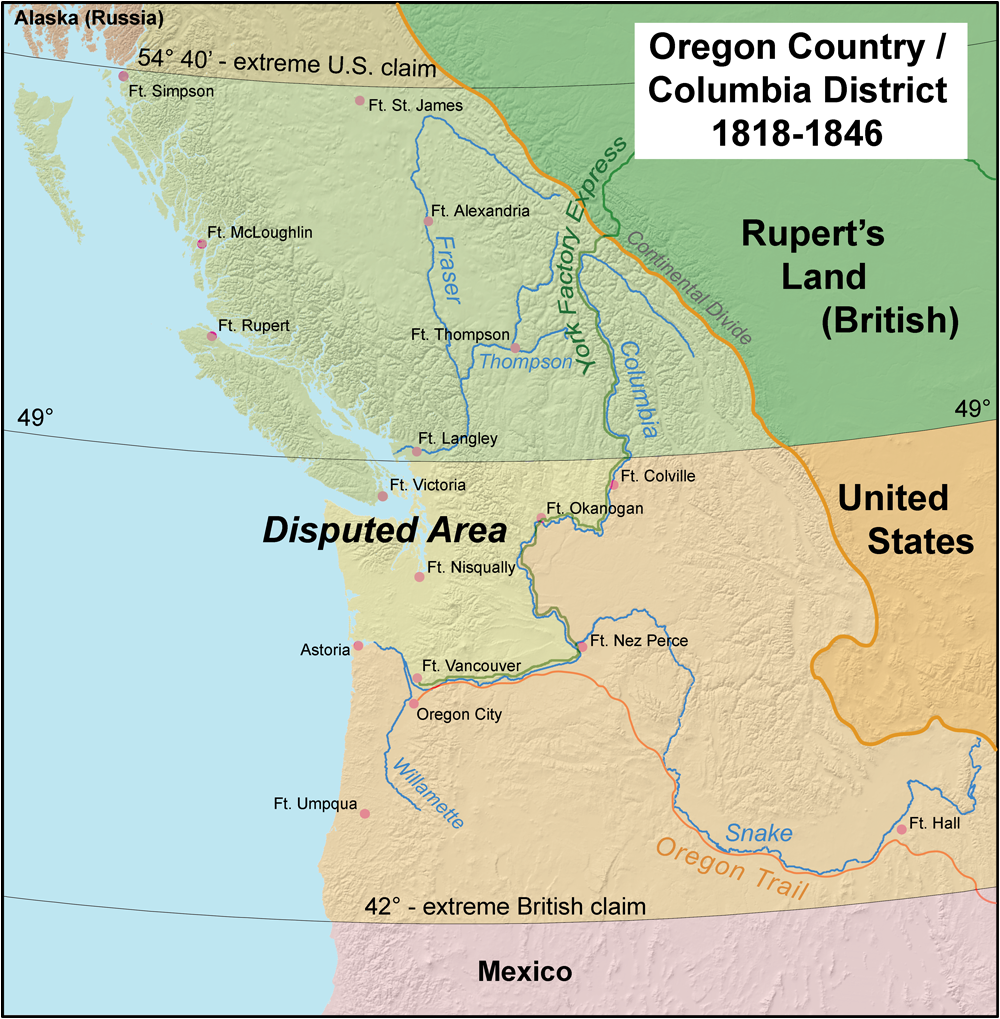
Map of the Oregon Country, with most heavily disputed area highlighted. The 1846 Oregon Treaty awarded this area to the U.S.

During the 1820s and early 1830s the American West was explored by private trappers who formed fur trading companies originating from St. Louis. One of these privateer trappers and explorers was Jedediah Smith who led expeditions into the American West. On October 29, 1830, Smith sent Jackson's Secretary of War John H. Eaton a letter and map containing information that he had gathered from 1824 to 1830 of his explorations into the Rockies, the South Pass, and Pacific Northwest. Smith recommended that President Jackson terminate the Treaty of 1818 that gave the British free rein over the Columbia River, and reported that the Indians favored the British over the Americans.

British fur interests tried to block Americans by creating a "fur desert" along the eastern and southern borders by trapping all the animals and leaving nothing for the Americans.

The balance of power shifted in the 1830s as thousands of Anglo American settlers arrived, completely dominating the southern half of the disputed region. Joint occupation ended with the signing of the Oregon Treaty in 1846, when Britain and the U.S. split the disputed region equally, along present borders, with the U.S. generally receiving lands south of the 49th parallel.

== Settlement by pioneers ==
The Astor Expedition of 1810–1812, financed by American businessman John Jacob Astor, brought fur traders to the future site of Astoria by both land and sea. Fort Astoria was the first permanent white settlement in the region. Although the fort would remain under American control for only a short time, it would become a component of the United States' later claim on the region. A party returning east discovered the South Pass through the Rocky Mountains, which would become an important feature of the Oregon Trail.

At risk of being captured by the British during the War of 1812, Fort Astoria and all other Pacific Fur Company assets in the Oregon Country were sold to the Montreal-based North West Company in October 1813. The North West Company had already been expanding into the Pacific Northwest and dominated the region unchallenged from the 1813 acquisition of the Pacific Fur Company until 1821, when it was absorbed into the Hudson's Bay Company. During this time the North West Company put the Astorian scheme into practice, sending supplies by sea to the Columbia River and exporting furs directly to China. The Hudson's Bay Company expanded the system and during the 1820s and 1830s dominated the Pacific Northwest from its Columbia District headquarters at Fort Vancouver (built in 1825 by the District's Chief Factor John McLoughlin across the Columbia from present-day Portland). Although fur depletion and a crash in fur prices undermined the company in the early 1840s, it remained an important presence until the Oregon Treaty of 1846.

In the 1830s, several parties of Americans traveled to Oregon, further establishing the Oregon Trail. Many of these emigrants were missionaries seeking to convert natives to Christianity. Jason Lee was the first, traveling in Nathaniel Jarvis Wyeth's party in 1833 and establishing the Oregon Mission in the Willamette Valley; the Whitmans and Spaldings arrived in 1836, establishing the Whitman Mission east of the Cascades. In 1839 the Peoria Party embarked for Oregon from Illinois.

In 1841, wealthy master trapper and entrepreneur Ewing Young died without a will, and there was no system to probate his estate. A probate government was proposed at a meeting after Young's funeral. Doctor Ira Babcock of Jason Lee's Methodist Mission was elected Supreme Judge. Babcock chaired two meetings in 1842 at Champoeg (halfway between Lee's mission and Oregon City) to discuss wolves and other animals of contemporary concern. These meetings were precursors to an all-citizen meeting in 1843, which instituted a provisional government headed by an executive committee made up of David Hill, Alanson Beers, and Joseph Gale. This government was the first acting public government of the Oregon Country before American annexation. The infamous "Lash Law," requiring that blacks in Oregon – be they free or slave – be whipped twice a year "until he or she shall quit the territory," is passed in June 1844. It is soon deemed too harsh and its provisions for punishment are reduced to forced labor in December 1844.

The Oregon Trail brought many new settlers to the region, starting in 1842–1843, after the United States agreed to jointly settle the Oregon Country with the United Kingdom. For some time, it seemed the United States and the United Kingdom would go to war for a third time in 75 years (see Oregon boundary dispute), but the border was defined peacefully in 1846 by the Oregon Treaty. The border between the United States and British North America was set at the 49th parallel. The Oregon Territory was officially organized in 1848.

Numerous efforts to find easier overland passage to the Willamette Valley were undertaken beginning in the 1840s. The Barlow Road, Meek Cutoff, and Applegate Trail represented efforts to cross the Cascades in the northern, central, and southern parts of Oregon, respectively. The Barlow Road would become the final leg of the Oregon Trail after its construction in 1846, and the Santiam Wagon Road would cut through the central part of the mountains, succeeding where Meek had failed.

Settlement increased because of the Donation Land Claim Act of 1850, in conjunction with the forced relocation of the native population to Indian reservations. The state was admitted to the Union on February 14, 1859.

== Oregon in the Civil War ==
At the outbreak of the American Civil War, regular U.S. troops were withdrawn and sent east. Volunteer cavalry and infantry were recruited in California and sent north to Oregon to keep peace and protect the populace. Oregon also raised the 1st Oregon Cavalry that was activated in 1862 and served until June 1865. During the Civil War, immigrants continued to clash with the Paiute, Shoshone and Bannock tribes in Oregon, Idaho and Nevada until relations degenerated into the bloody 1864 - 1868 Snake War. The 1st Oregon Volunteer Infantry Regiment was formed in 1864 and its last company was mustered out of service in July 1867. Both units were used to guard travel routes and Native American reservations, escort immigrant wagon trains, and protect settlers from Native American raiders. Several infantry detachments also accompanied survey parties and built roads in central and southern Oregon.

Oregon Senator Col. Edward Dickinson Baker was killed leading Union troops at the Battle of Ball's Bluff on October 21, 1861.

== Racial discrimination ==
Both the Oregon Territory and the State of Oregon have had multiple laws and policies discriminating against racial minorities. An 1844 territorial statute outlawed slavery (slave owners were allowed to keep their slaves for three years upon which they would be freed) but also forced freed slaves to leave the territory under threat of lashing (later hard labor). Explaining the law, head of Oregon's legislative assembly Peter Burnett said this:

The object is to keep clear of that most troublesome class of population. We are in a new world, under the most favorable circumstances and we wish to avoid most of those evils that have so much afflicted the United States and other countries.

At the same time, Oregon was a free state. At the time, most Oregonians held white supremacist and racial exclusionary views and were indifferent if not hostile towards abolitionism, but wanted to prevent the land in Oregon from being taken over by large plantations as in the Southern United States so that they would not have to compete with bonded labor.

On November 9, 1857, the Oregon Territory's electorate, consisting of white men above the age of 21, voted 7,195 (69.25%) for and 3,195 (30.75%) against adopting the Constitution of Oregon. At the same election, the voters voted 7,727 (74.50%) against and 2,645 (25.50%) for slavery; and 8,640 (88.88%) against and 1,081 (11.12%) for allowing black people to reside in Oregon.

The law was repealed the following year before it could take effect. Another law, passed in 1849, prohibited black immigration into the territory. The law was repealed in 1854. An exclusion clause was incorporated into the Oregon constitution in 1857, and stood through multiple repeal attempts until finally being repealed by a narrow margin in 1916. A law adopted by the state in 1862 required all ethnic minorities to pay a $5 annual tax, and interracial marriage was prohibited by law between (approximately) 1861 and 1951.

== Railroads and growth ==
In the 1880s, the proliferation of railroads assisted in marketing of the state's lumber and wheat, as well as the more rapid growth of its cities. This included the connection of the state to the Eastern United States via links to the transcontinental railroads that allowed for faster movement of goods and people. Immigration to Oregon increased after the connection to the east. Additional transportation improvements included the construction of several locks and canals to ease river navigation.

Also in the 1880s, writer Frances Fuller Victor published both fiction and histories that drew on her extensive research of the history of the region, informed by personal interviews with a number of Oregon pioneers. Her most noted non-fiction, which covered many western states, was written while under contract with Hubert Howe Bancroft's History Company, and at the time was published under his name. Her writing was said to accurately capture the notion of Manifest Destiny in this period of American expansion.

== "Oregon System" in the Progressive era, 1897–1917 ==
Oregon was a remote state, little known east of the Rockies. In the 1900 U.S. presidential election, only 83,000 men voted, and Republican William McKinley won by a landslide. New York City Muckraker Lincoln Steffens was surprised when he visited in 1908 to discover that:

Oregon has more fundamental legislation than any other state in the Union excepting only Oklahoma....Yet it has enacted laws which enable its people to govern themselves when they want to. How did this happen? How did the state of graft get all her tools for democracy?

In 1902, Oregon approved of a system of direct legislation by the state's citizens by way of initiative and referendum, known as the Oregon System, and in 1908 also empowered its citizens to recall public officials by ballot initiative.

The most influential figure was William U'Ren, a highly energetic activist and leader of the Direct Legislation League and the Nonpartisan Direct Legislation League of Oregon from 1898. U'Ren never sought high office, but was an indefatigable organizer who drew the Oregon's progressives together for many causes. They included especially the initiative and also the referendum, recall, corrupt practices act, the presidential primary, and direct election of U.S. senators.

Other leaders included Jonathan Bourne Jr. a Republican in the U.S. Senate in 1907–1913. He was the first American chosen to the Senate by popular vote, thanks to Oregon's direct primary law, which obligated the legislature to select the candidate with the highest vote in the primary. In 1908, he was a national leader in the group that attempted to persuade Theodore Roosevelt run for a third term as president; Roosevelt declined. In 1911-1912 Bourne served as president of the National Republican Progressive League. He organized the Republican Publicity Association in 1912. Bourne was not renominated to his Senate seat in 1912 by the Republican Party. He responded by running under the "Popular Government" third party banner, coming in third. Democrats who promoted progressive policies included George Earle Chamberlain (governor 1903 to 1909 and U.S. senator 1909 to 1921); Oswald West (governor 1911 to 1915); and Harry Lane (senator 1913–1917).

== Modern history ==
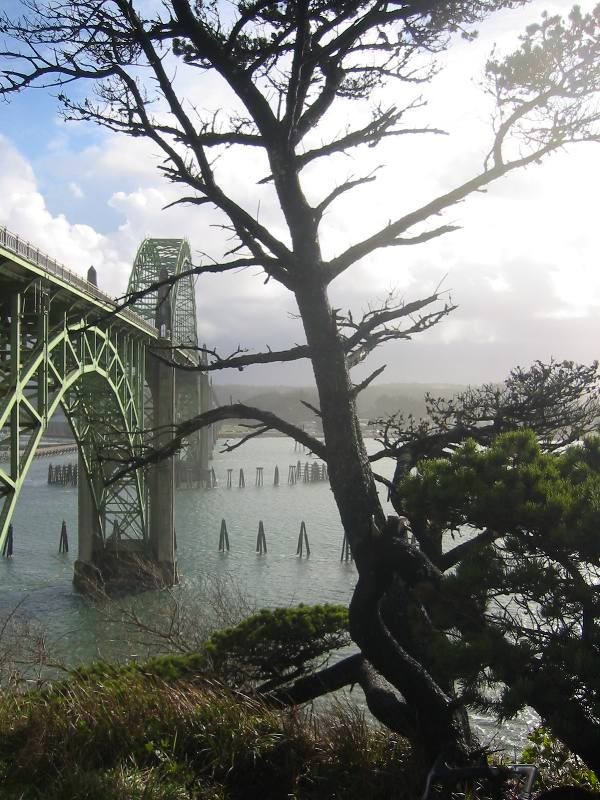
Engineer Conde McCullough designed many of Oregon's bridges, including the Yaquina Bay Bridge in Newport.

Industrial expansion began in earnest following the construction of the Bonneville Dam in 1933–1937 on the Columbia River. The power, food, and lumber provided by Oregon helped fuel the development of the West, although the periodic fluctuations in the nation's building industry have hurt the state's economy on multiple occasions.

The state has a long history of polarizing conflicts: Native Americans vs. British fur trappers, British vs. settlers from the U.S., ranchers vs. farmers, wealthy growing cities vs. established but poor rural areas, loggers vs. environmentalists, white supremacists vs. anti-racists, social progressivism vs. small government conservatism, supporters of social spending vs. anti-tax activists, and native Oregonians vs. Californians (or outsiders in general). Oregonians also have a long history of secessionist ideas, with people in various regions and on all sides of the political spectrum attempting to form other states and even other countries. (See State of Jefferson, Cascadia, and Ecotopia.)

Oregon still has the initiative, but by the late 1930s it was used to promote conservative causes and undo liberal reforms. In the 21st century state ballots often include right-wing proposals such as anti-gay and pro-religious measures side by side with politically liberal issues like drug decriminalization which demonstrates the wide spectrum of political values in the state.

The historical policies of racial discrimination have had long-term effects on Oregon's population. A 1994 report from an Oregon Supreme Court task force found minorities more likely to be arrested, charged, convicted, incarcerated and on probation than "similarly situated non-minorities." The report does not place blame on individuals, but instead points out the problems of institutional racism. The report recommends multicultural training of the existing justice system personnel and also recommends diversifying the perspectives, backgrounds and demographics of future hires.

=== 2020s ===
The COVID-19 pandemic was confirmed to have reached the U.S. state of Oregon on February 28, 2020. On that day, Governor Kate Brown created a coronavirus response team; on March 8 she declared a state of emergency; and on March 23 she issued a statewide stay-at-home order with class C misdemeanor charges for violators.

In April, Oregon joined Washington and California in the Western States Pact, an agreement to coordinate the restarting of economic activity while controlling the outbreak. By the end of June 2020, Governor Brown announced that face masks would be required indoors, effective July 1.

Economic impacts of COVID-19 in Oregon included stock market losses for major companies, reduced airline flights, losses for food and entertainment industries, and closures of libraries and museums.

In early March 2020, universities and K–12 schools closed statewide, and began providing online instruction. Professional and college sports teams cancelled training, games, and tournaments.

By May 14, 2021, 31 of Oregon's 36 counties had met OHA requirements to enter the first phase of a three-phase process to reopen businesses.

As of September 1, 2022, 77.3% of the adult population has completed the primary COVID-19 vaccination series. 84.9% of the state's adult population has received at least one dose of a vaccine.

== See also ==
- Bibliography of Oregon history
- Capital punishment in Oregon
- History of Portland, Oregon
- History of the Pacific Northwest
- History of the Western United States
- List of fiction set in Oregon
- List of governors of Oregon
- List of historical societies in Oregon
- List of native Oregon plants
- List of Oregon ballot measures
- List of Oregon county name etymologies
- List of Oregon judges
- List of Oregon shipwrecks
- List of Oregon State Government Agencies
- List of people from Oregon
- List of Registered Historic Places in Oregon
- List of years in Oregon
- Mount Hood Freeway
- Postal history of Oregon
- Territorial evolution of Oregon
- Timeline of Oregon history
