= 2019 in Oregon =

- Decades: 1990s; 2000s; 2010s; 2020s
- See also: History of Oregon; Historical outline of Oregon; List of years in Oregon; 2019 in the United States

The year 2019 in Oregon involved several major events.

== Politics and government ==
- Oregon House Bill 2020
- 2019 Oregon Senate Republican walkouts

=== Incumbents ===
- Governor: Kate Brown (D)
- Secretary of State:
  - Dennis Richardson (R) (until February 27)
  - Bev Clarno (R) (after April 3)

== Events ==
=== Ongoing ===
- 2018–19 Oregon Battle of the Books controversy
- 2019 Pacific Northwest measles outbreak

=== January ===
- January 2019 North American winter storm
- January 4 – Michael Cox, chief of staff of Portland Mayor Ted Wheeler, resigns.
- January 19 – Tasty n Sons closes, moving to another location and rebranding as Tasty n Daughters.

=== February ===
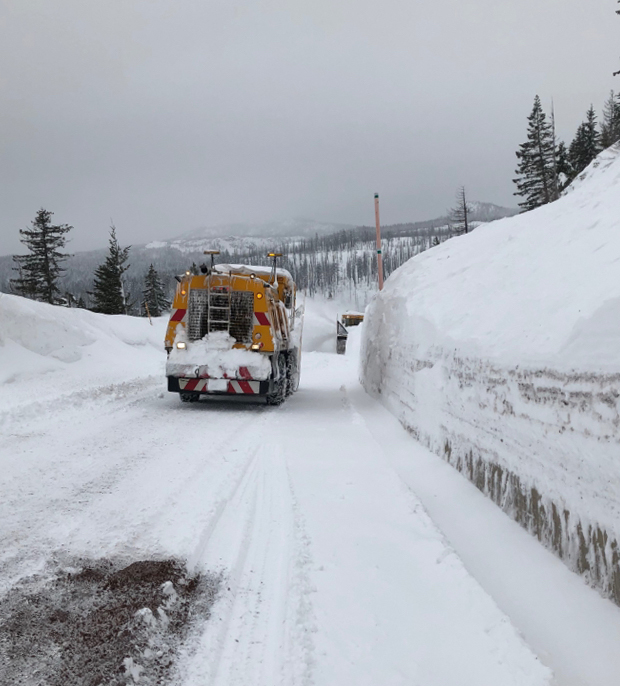
A snow plow clears a road near Hogg Rock, February 2019

- February 19 – Portland's No Vacancy Lounge club closes.
- February 24 – The annual Fisher Poets Gathering is held in Astoria.
- February 25 – Several cities in eastern Oregon receive an unusually high amount of snow during an ongoing cold wave. A record for the month of February is set in Bend and the Redmond Airport closes for two days.
- February 28 – Portland-based metal band Pillorian officially dissolves.
- Unknown day
  - The Burnside Brewing Company's pub closes.
  - British Overseas Restaurant Corporation closes.

=== March ===
- March 2 – Portland's Hawthorne Asylum food cart pod has its grand opening, with the initial food carts having moved in throughout the month of February.
- March 3
  - About 2,000 people attend the 2019 Womxn's March and Rally for Action in Portland. The event had been rescheduled from January to March to avoid scheduling conflicts with Martin Luther King Jr. Day, when Women's Marches took place in other cities across the country.
  - Shut Up and Eat closes.
- March 6 – The Oregon Shakespeare Festival officially opens for the season, which will run through October.
- March 12 – Portland-based jazz musician Jim Beatty dies from complications of a stroke.
- March 18 – About 200 sturgeon are stranded in a shallow area in Sturgeon Lake due to low water levels.
- March 21 – Attackers gain access to personal information of hundreds of people involved in Oregon's foster care and welfare programs in a successful phishing attack.
- March 23 – Assembly Brewing opens.
- March 31 – Multnomah County observes their first Transgender Day of Visibility.

=== April ===
- April 3 – Bev Clarno is sworn in as Secretary of State.
- April 25 – Edwin Lara, already serving a life sentence for his 2016 murder of Kaylee Sawyer, receives a second life sentence for carjacking and kidnapping.

=== May ===
- Multiple days – 2019 Oregon Senate Republican walkouts
- May 2 – The federal government approves a disaster declaration for the February storm that damaged infrastructure in Coos, Jefferson, Lane, Curry, and Douglas Counties.
- May 8 – Thousands of teachers participate in walkouts and rallies organized by the Oregon Education Association to advocate for more funding for public education.
- May 19 – A magnitude 3.4 earthquake strikes off the Oregon coast.
- May 21 – "At least 1,000 people" attend a Portland Stop the Bans rally for abortion rights.

=== June ===
- June 15–16 – Portland Pride Festival
- June 20 – Republican state senators stage a walkout to block Oregon House Bill 2020. Governor Brown sends the Oregon State Police to search for the senators, but the efforts fails because the senators have fled the state.
- June 29 – Republican state senators return after spending nine days outside of the state, having effectively blocked Oregon House Bill 2020 until at least the next legislative session.
- June 30 – The Alder Street food cart pod closes.

=== July ===
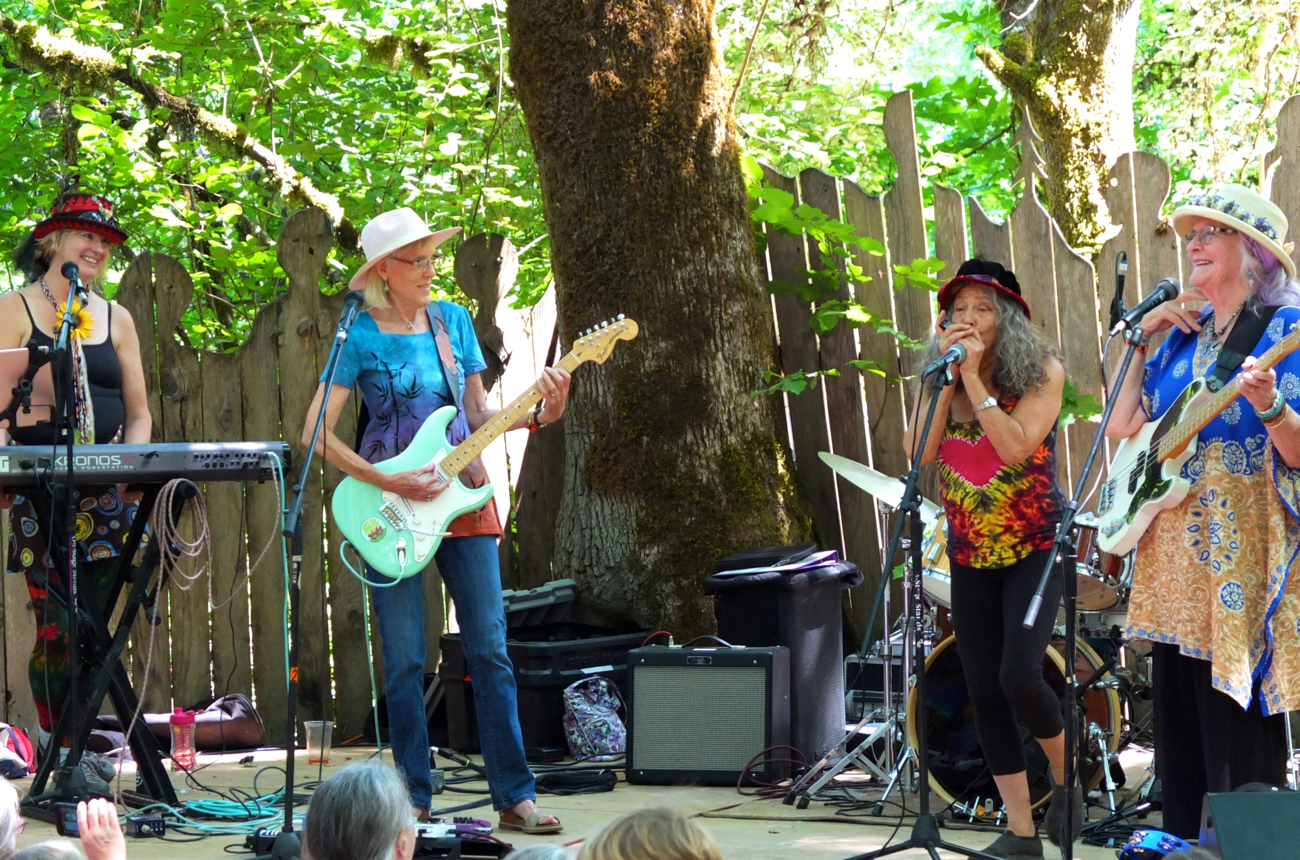
The Ace of Cups performed at the 2019 Oregon Country Fair.

- July 1 – A tornado strikes Northeast Portland.
- July 5 – Audrey McCall Beach opens, becoming Portland's second public access beach.
- July 12–14 – The 50th annual Oregon Country Fair is held in Veneta, Oregon, with over 58,000 people attending.

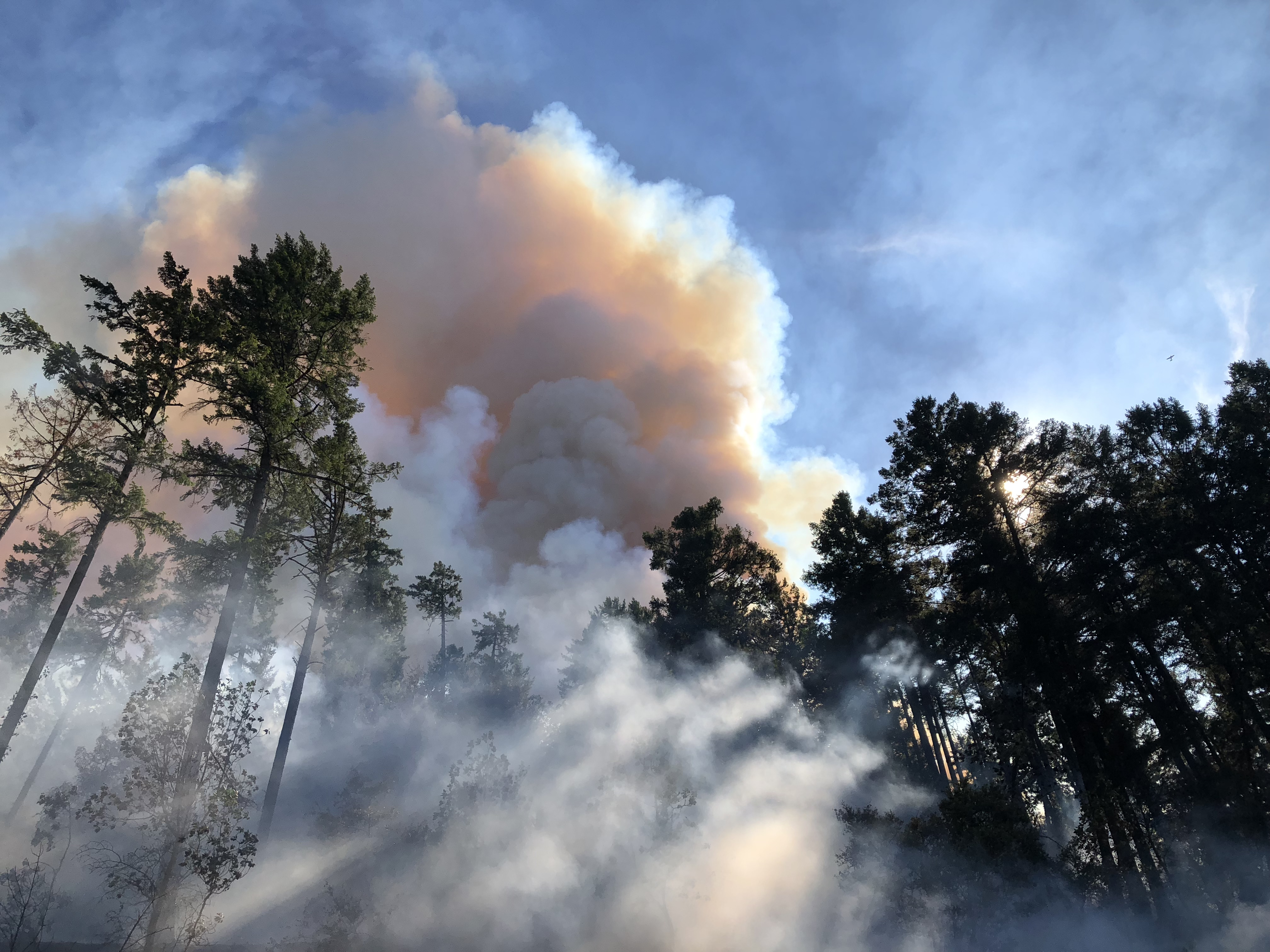
Milepost 97 fire

- July 24 – The Milepost 17 fire begins.

=== August ===
- August 2–4 – Pickathon
- August 5 –The Milepost 17 fire is 95% contained.
- August 17 – End Domestic Terrorism rally
- August 27 – The Hillsboro Tribune publishes its final issue, to be replaced by the News-Times.
- August 31 – Tonic Lounge closes.

=== September ===
- September 8 – A tornado touches down near Rockcreek, marking the second tornado to strike the Portland area this year.
- September 20 – Thousands attend student-led protests against climate change in Portland and other Oregon cities as part of the September 2019 climate strikes.

=== October ===
- October 1 – After 99 days, the state's 2019 fire season ends; it is the shortest season since 2000.
- October 6 – Portland Marathon
- October 10 – Nike announces the end of the Nike Oregon Project following the investigation of coach Alberto Salazar.
- October 26 – Portland's Southeast Grind coffee shop closes.
- October 27
  - The Barbara Walker Crossing footbridge opens, connecting paths in Forest Park so that pedestrians no longer have to cross Burnside Street.
  - Portland's Little Bird Bistro closes.
  - The Oregon Shakespeare Festival closes for the year.

=== November ===
- November 9 – Ben & Esther's Vegan Jewish Deli opens in Portland.
- November 10 – Cider Riot closes.
- November 26 – December 3, 2019 North American blizzard

== Deaths ==
- January 5 – Kenneth Hedberg (born 1920), chemist
- January 17 – Joe O'Donnell (born 1941), American football player
- January 22 – Maureen Murphy (born 1939), swimmer
- January 29 – Andy Hebenton (born 1929), ice hockey player
- January 31 – Andrzej Wieckowski (born 1945), chemistry professor
- February 5 – Garr King (born 1936), judge and lawyer
- February 9 – John Tyler Bonner (born 1920), biologist
- February 15 – J. Mary Taylor (born 1932), mammologist and professor
- February 26 – Dennis Richardson (born 1949), politician
- February 28 – Norma Paulus (born 1933), politician
- March 12 – Jim Beatty (born 1934), jazz musician
- March 20 – Leonard Wolf (born 1923), writer, translator, and educator
- March 28 – Dan Earl May (born 1952), artist
- April 8
  - Shirley Abbott (born 1934), writer
  - Josine Ianco-Starrels (born 1926), art curator
  - Jimmy McLeod (born 1937), ice hockey player
- April 23 – Nils John Nilsson (born 1933), computer scientist
- April 26 – Jim Marsh (born 1946), basketball player
- May 10 – Robert D. Maxwell (born 1920), US Army Medal of Honor recipient
- May 29 – Jackie Winters (born 1936), politician
- June 16 – Monte Shelton (born 1933), racing driver
- June 22 – George Herman (born 1928), playwright and actor
- June 28
  - Charles Levin (born 1949), actor
  - Judith Poxson Fawkes (born 1941), tapestry weaver
- July 10 – Jim Shanley (born 1936), American football player
- July 12 – Stanley Gordon Sturges (born 1929), physician and missionary
- July 18 – Macy Morse (born 1921), political activist
- July 23 – Dorothy Olsen (born 1916), aviator
- August 4 – Ronald Talney, poet
- Marty Wood (born 1933), rodeo cowboy
- August 26 – Greg Barton (born 1946), American football player
- August 27 – Jessi Combs (born 1980), racer and television personality
- September 9 – Robert S. Lancaster (born 1958), computer programmer and skeptical activist
- September 12 – Bill Schmeling (born 1938), cartoonist known as "The Hun"
- October 4 – James Schmerer (born 1938), television producer
- October 8
  - David Schuman (born 1944), judge and attorney
  - Quade Winter (born 1951), singer and composer
- October 26 – Gordon French (born 1935), computer engineer and programmer
- November 3
  - Gert Boyle (born 1924), businesswoman
  - Gabriel Jackson (born 1921), Hispanist
- November 26 – Siegfried Engelmann (born 1931), educationalist
- November 27 – Agnes Baker Pilgrim (born 1924), activist and Takelma tribal elder
- December 5 – Jerry Naylor (born 1939), country music singer
- December 11 – Mary E. Clark (born 1927), biologist and professor
