= Mary Clark =

Mary Clark may refer to:

- Mary Bateman Clark (c. 1795–1840), American woman, born into slavery, who won her freedom
- Mary Clark (architect) (born 1936), Canadian architect
- Mary Clark-Glass (active since 1974), academic, medical administrator and former politician in Northern Ireland
- Mary Clark (printer) (active 1677–1696), London printer and publisher
- Mary Clark (politician) (died 1987), American politician
- Mary Clark Thompson (1835–1923), philanthropist and wife of banker Frederick Ferris Thompson
- Mary E. Clark (1927–2019), American biologist
- Mary Elizabeth Clark (born 1938), main mover of the AIDS Education and Global Information System
- Mary Ellen Clark (born 1962), American diver
- Mary Higgins Clark (1927–2020), American author
- Mary Jane Clark (born 1954), American author
- Mary Kitson Clark (1905–2005), British archaeologist
- M. Margaret Clark (1925–2003), American medical anthropologist
- Mary Mead Clark, American wife of missionary Edward Winter Clark
- Mary T. Clark (1913–2014), American historian of philosophy

== See also ==
- Mary Clarke (disambiguation)
