= Peter Cho =

Chef and restaurateur

- Born: Seoul, South Korea
- Occupations: Chef; restaurateur

Peter Cho is an American chef and restaurateur in Portland, Oregon. His restaurants include Han Oak and Toki.

== Early life and education ==
Cho was born in Seoul, Korea and raised in Eugene, Oregon. He attended the University of Oregon.

== Personal life ==
Cho moved to Portland in 2013.

== See also ==
- List of chefs
- List of people from Portland, Oregon
- List of University of Oregon alumni
- List of restaurateurs
