= Tasty n Sons =

Defunct restaurant in Portland, Oregon, U.S.

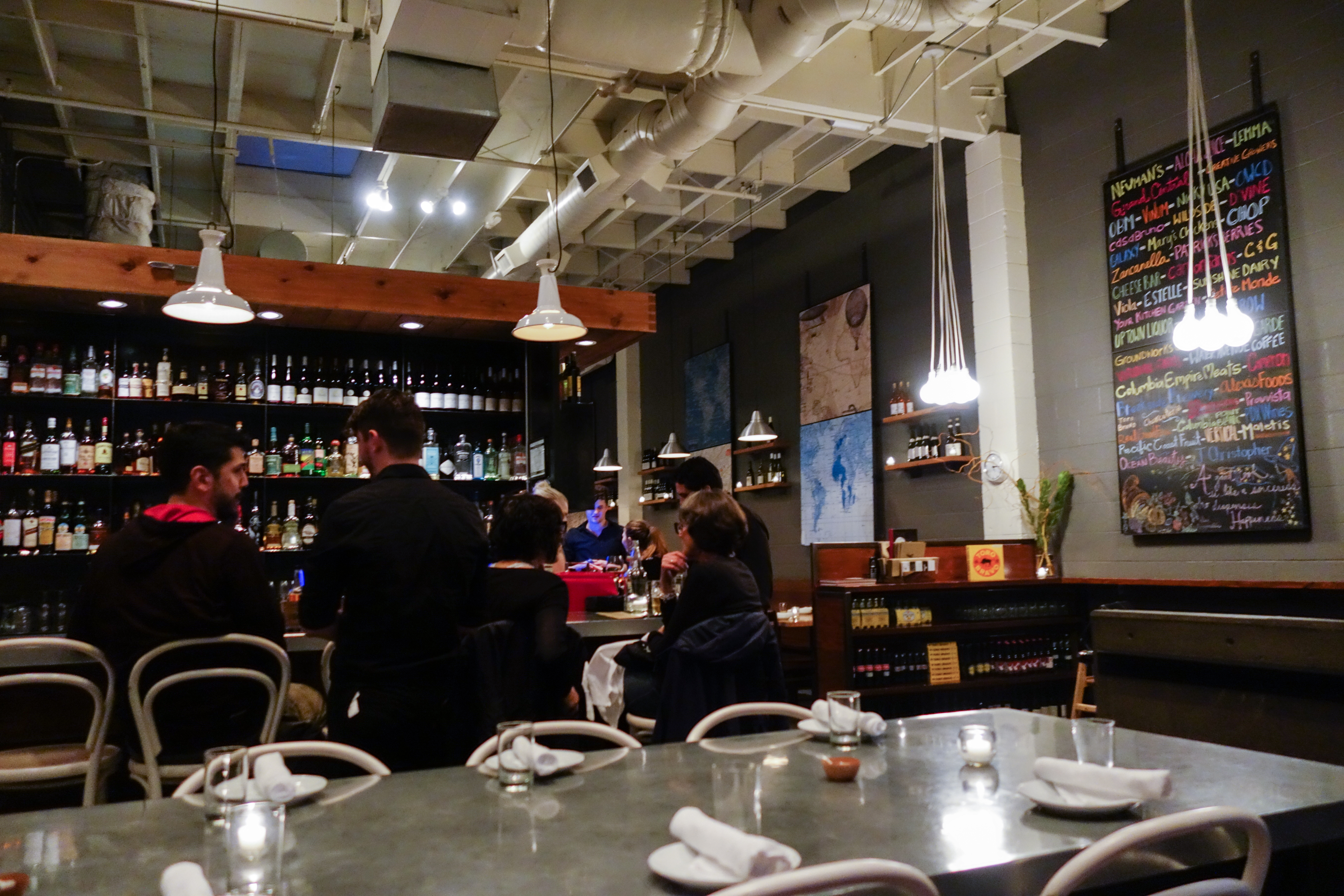
- The restaurant's interior, 2016
- Interactive map of Tasty n Sons

Restaurant information
- Location: 3808 North Williams Avenue, Portland, Multnomah, Oregon, 97227, United States
- Coordinates: 45.54991°N 122.66645°W
- Website: tastynsons.com

Tasty n Sons was a restaurant in Portland, Oregon's Boise neighborhood, in the United States. The business was named Willamette Week's Restaurant of the Year in 2010, and one of the city's best restaurants by The Oregonian in 2016. The North Williams restaurant closed on January 20, 2019, and was relocated and reopened as Tasty n Daughters, in the space currently occupied by The Woodsman Tavern, in February 2019.

Tasty n Sons' sister restaurant, Tasty n Alder, was located in downtown Portland.

== Reception ==
The business was included in Portland Monthly's 2025 list of 25 restaurants "that made Portland".
