= Eater's Guide to the World =

TV series

- Genre: Documentary

Production
- Running time: 30 minutes
- Production companies: Hulu Originals; Hulu; Vox Media Studios

Eater's Guide to the World is a series on Hulu.

The first episode, focused on dining alone in the Pacific Northwest, featured Eem, Han Oak, and Reel M Inn in Portland, Oregon, and Kamonegi in Seattle, among other restaurants.
