= Toki (restaurant) =

Defunct Korean restaurant in Portland, Oregon, U.S.

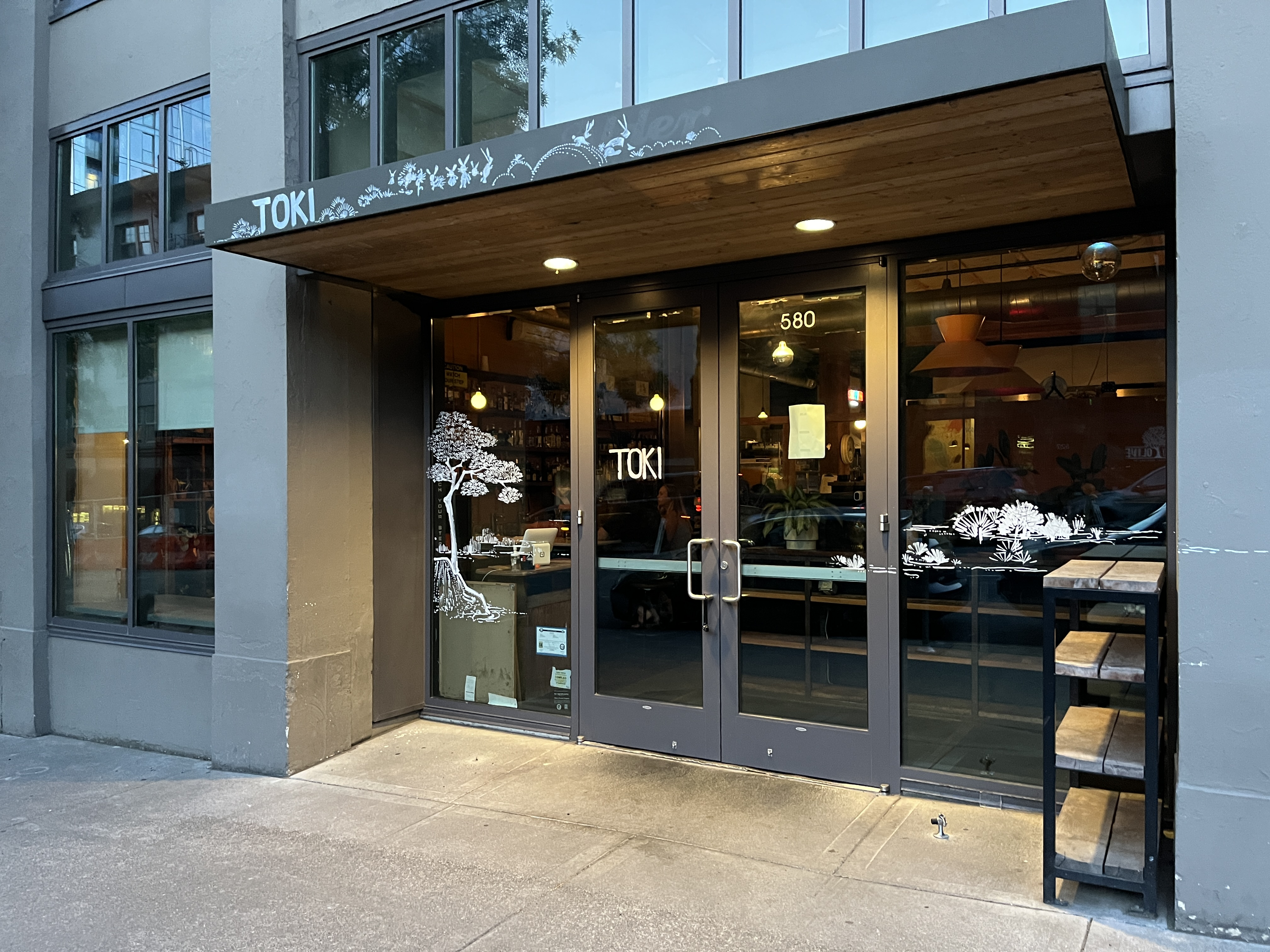
- The restaurant's exterior, 2022
- Interactive map of Toki

Restaurant information
- Established: January 2021
- Owners: Peter Cho; Sun Young Park
- Food type: Korean
- Location: 580 Southwest 12th Avenue, Portland, Multnomah, Oregon, 97205, United States
- Coordinates: 45.5213°N 122.6835°W

Toki (sometimes Toki PDX or Toki Restaurant) was a Korean restaurant in Portland, Oregon. It closed in 2024.

== Description ==
Toki was a Korean restaurant in downtown Portland, "spun off" from Han Oak and specializing in bao bun burgers and "snacky" brunch specials. The menu was an expanded version of Han Oak's and included bibimbap, bulgogi, dumplings, gimbap, Korean fried chicken, noodles, and a steamed bao burger. There were three varieties of Korean fried chicken: Korean-style hot chili oil, sweet garlic soy glaze, and Han Oak's "essence of instant ramen" seasoning blend intended to taste like instant noodle flavor packets. According to Willamette Week, the Gim-bap Supreme was inspired by Taco Bell and the TikTok "wrap" trend, in which "a tortilla is partially cut into four quadrants, topped with four different ingredients, folded into layers, and griddled". The Buldak-ra-Bboki was described as a "creative mashup" of buldak and tteokbokki. The brunch menu had doughnuts and breakfast sandwiches, including a bao bun with everything bagel seasoning, koji-cured pork belly or a sausage patty, egg, and cheese. Dalgona coffee was also served.

== History ==
Peter Cho, chef and owner of the Korean restaurant Han Oak, and partner Sun Young Park opened Toki in January 2021, in the space which previously housed Tasty n Alder. Initially, the business operated via take-out during the COVID-19 pandemic. Michael Russell of The Oregonian has said Toki was "fueled by tasty TikTok trends".

The restaurant closed permanently in 2024.

== Reception ==
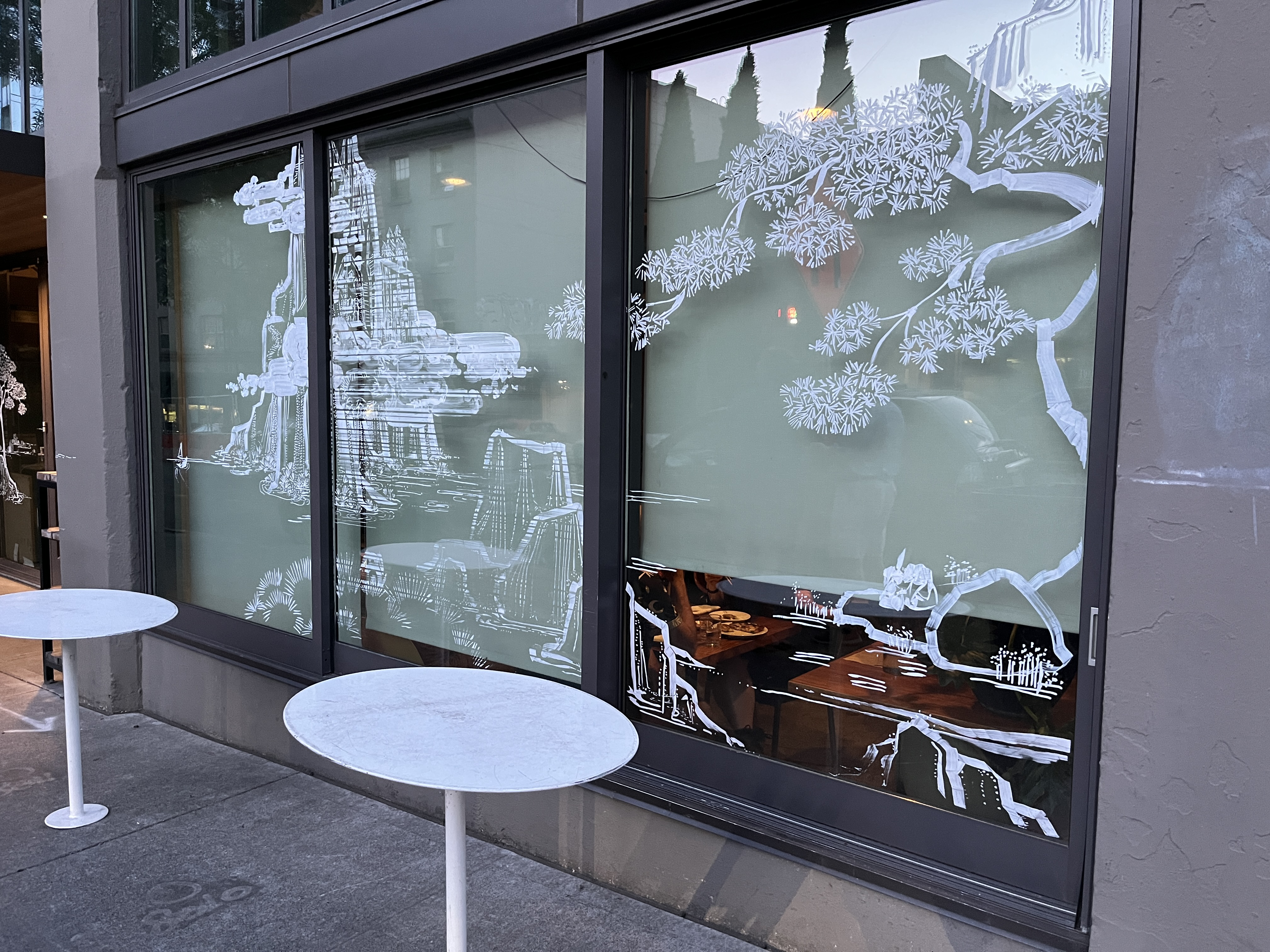
Exterior, 2022

In 2021, Michael Russell included Toki in The Oregonian's list of "Portland's best new restaurants of 2021 (and 2020)" and recommended "noodles, dumplings, the lunch doshirak with mackerel and fried chicken in all its forms". He later included the restaurant in The Oregonian's 2023 list of Portland's ten best new brunches and 2024 list of the year's 21 "most painful" restaurant and bar closures in the city.

Toki was included in several Eater Portland lists in 2021: Alex Frane included the restaurant in "17 Spots to Grab Amazing Breakfast Sandwiches", Nick Woo and Nick Townsend included the Korean fried chicken in "14 Real-Deal Fried Chicken Spots in Portland", and Zoe Baillargeon included the Buldak-ra-Bboki in "Where to Find the Cheesiest Dishes in Portland and Beyond". Additionally, the website's Brooke Jackson-Glidden said Toki "has become a must-visit spot for downtown brunch". The business was included in Eater Portland's 2022 overview of "Where to Eat and Drink in Downtown Portland".

Portland Monthly included the pork belly breakfast sandwich in a 2021 list of "11 Breakfast Sandwiches to Get You out of Bed". The magazine's Katherine Chew Hamilton also included the restaurant in an overview of the city's best fried chicken. Portland Monthly included the omurice in a 2022 list of "The 12 Best Breakfasts in Portland". In 2023, Cho was one of 18 Portland industry professionals deemed "rising stars" by the restaurant resource and trade publication StarChefs.

== See also ==
- History of Korean Americans in Portland, Oregon
- List of Korean restaurants
