= Tasty n Daughters =

Defunct restaurant in Portland, Oregon, U.S.

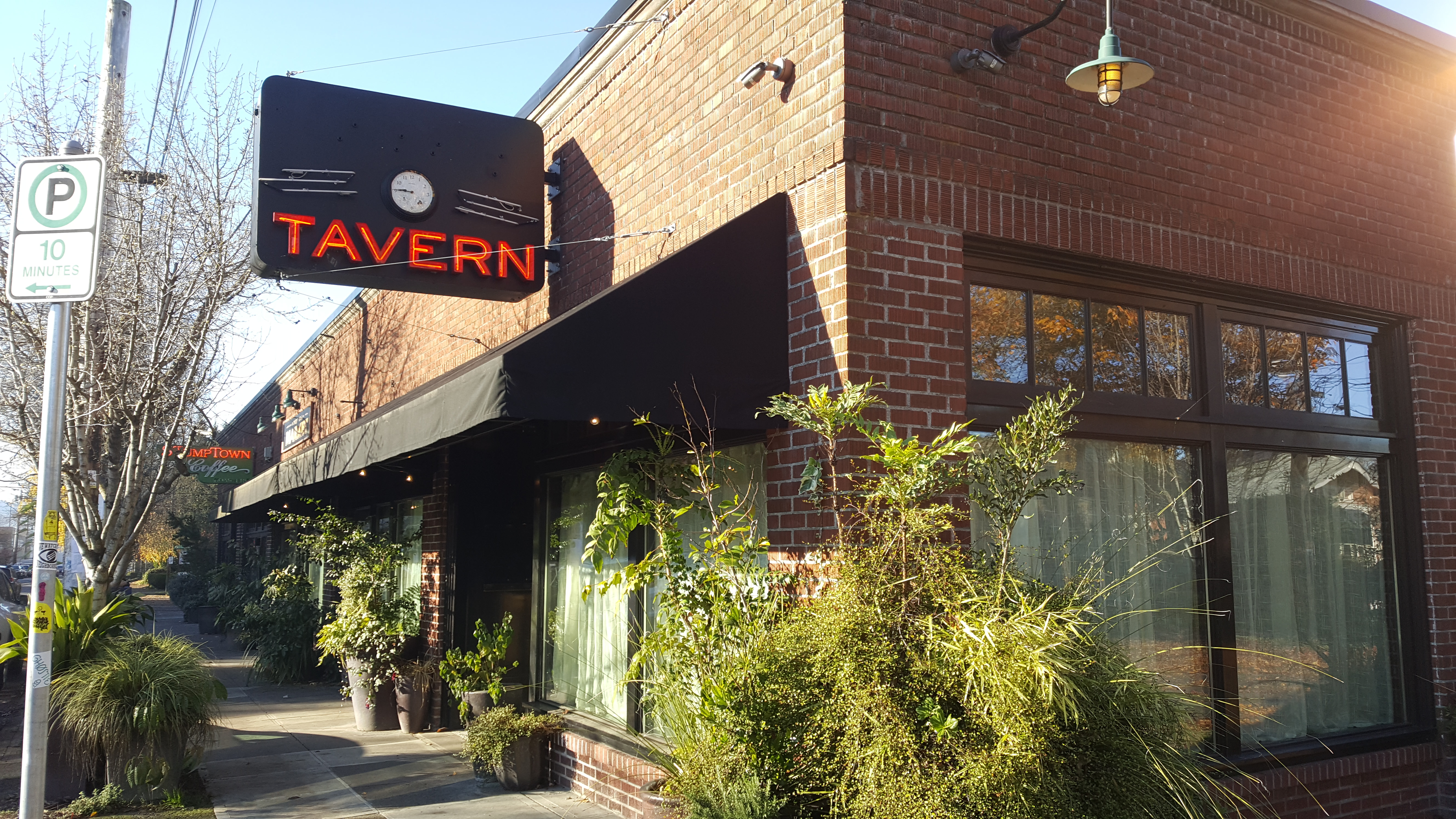
- This building at Southeast 46th and Division, pictured in November 2020, housed Tasty n Daughters before the restaurant closed in mid 2020
- Interactive map of Tasty n Daughters

Restaurant information
- Established: February 2019
- Closed: 2020
- Food type: New American
- Location: 4537 SE Division Street, Portland, Multnomah, Oregon, 97206, United States
- Coordinates: 45.5054°N 122.6153°W

Tasty n Daughters was a restaurant in Portland, Oregon. The "reboot" of Tasty n Sons opened in February 2019. It closed in mid 2020, during the COVID-19 pandemic, along with sibling restaurant Tasty n Alder.

== Description ==
The New American restaurant and cocktail bar was located on Division Street in southeast Portland's Richmond neighborhood. Tasty n Daughters initially served breakfast, brunch, and dinner; the menu had bacon-wrapped dates, Reuben sandwiches, frittatas, butternut squash ravioli, baby back rib ragu and macaroni and cheese. The menu has also included biscuit sandwiches, Burmese red pork and shakshuka, Israeli tomato-pepper stew, pastas (including a rigatoni with Sunday gravy and agnolotti), a steak and cheddar eggs skillet, and Turkish entrees, including beef and lamb manti as well as pide (flatbread with eggs, caramelized onions, eggplant, peppers, and feta). The drink menu had beer, bourbon, hot coffee by Water Avenue, and cold brew by Stumptown; a Bloody Mary, an Aperol Spritz, and a bourbon milk punch with nutmeg were available for breakfast. Scout Brobst of Eater Portland called the menu "specialty bites from across the globe" and described a "cornbread-adjacent" skillet corn cake with jalapeño butter. The restaurant's Fried Chicken Dinner box-set included fried chicken, jojo potato wedges, "Southern-inspired" coleslaw and macaroni and cheese.

While waiting to be seated, patrons could visit the adjacent R&R Room, which had previously served as The Woodsman Tavern's "market-turned-private event space". The space had couches and a limited menu of drinks and snacks. According to Brooke Jackson-Glidden of Eater Portland, "The subway-tile-lined room [got] some warmth from rich brown leather and several Turkish rugs, including one that [hung] on the wall like a tapestry... The Turkish rugs play off the restaurant's newfound Turkish influence, inspired by a family trip to Istanbul."

== History ==
The restaurant opened in February 2019. The "reboot" of Tasty n Sons accompanied a relocation from Williams Avenue in north Portland to the space which housed The Woodsman Tavern. Many of Tasty n Son's "signature worldly tapas dishes and shared plates" were carried over, and the menu was expanded to include pasta entrees and steaks, which were cooked in Josper ovens previously used by The Woodsman Tavern. Jackson-Glidden wrote, "The new Tasty retains much of the Southeast Portland tavern's original charm — the rustic feel of the dining room remains intact, as well as the restaurant's six original booths, brick, and touches of hazelnut brown. The team added new light fixtures, mahogany tables, and tufted leather booths, upping the overall lodge feel of the room." During the COVID-19 pandemic, Tasty n Daughters offered "larger-format" meals including fried chicken and prime rib, as well as third-party delivery service.

The restaurant closed in 2020, along with others by John Gorham's Toro Bravo, Inc.

Some employees of the Tasty brand reopened a restaurant called Tasty in Lake Oswego in 2021.

== Reception ==
Alex Frane chose the restaurant to represent Richmond in Thrillist's 2019 list of "The Best Brunch Spots in 17 Portland Neighborhoods". He said Tasty n Daughters "serves up a plethora of worldly dishes, mostly drawn from Mediterranean influences like shakshuka and Turkish pizza, as well as New York omelettes and reubens, Burmese stews, and a big, rich Dutch baby. Just as before, it's best to go as a group, order a number of plates, and share the wealth." In an overview of "Five Brunches You Should Be Eating Right Now", Andrea Damewood of the Portland Mercury said, "Tasty n Sons was already Portland canon; it's heartening to see the Gorhams keep tweaking perfection." Scout Brobst included Tasty n Daughters in Eater Portland's 2020 overview of "Where to Find Serious Cornbread Across Portland" and said the restaurant's "take on cornbread probably isn't what the cul de sac's Southern grandmother fried up, unless that grandmother had a taste for chili pepper and a knack for rebuffing tradition." Lonely Planet said, "A wait is most certainly guaranteed – kill time with cocktails and board games while listening to vinyl records at their 'R&R Room' next door, open daily."

== See also ==
- Impact of the COVID-19 pandemic on the restaurant industry in the United States
- List of New American restaurants
