= Forest Grove Leader =

Newspaper published in Oregon, US

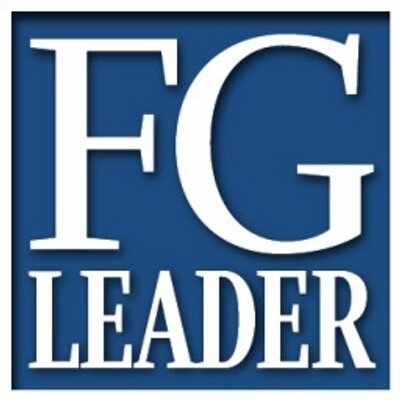
- Type: Weekly newspaper
- Format: Tabloid
- Owner: Advance Publications Inc.
- Publisher: Oregonian Publishing Co.
- Editor: Samantha Swindler (effective c. February 2013)
- Founded: 2012
- Ceased publication: 2016 (as the Forest Grove Leader); 2017 (as the Washington County Argus)
- Headquarters: Forest Grove, Oregon
- Website: oregonlive.com/leader

The Forest Grove Leader was a weekly community newspaper in Forest Grove in the U.S. state of Oregon. Started in 2012, it was published by the Oregonian Publishing Company, which also published The Hillsboro Argus newspaper and continues to publish The Oregonian. The free publication competed with the News-Times in the city, a suburb of the Portland metropolitan area. In January 2016, it was combined with two other newspapers to form the Washington County Argus, but the Argus ceased publication only 14 months later, in March 2017.

== History ==
The Oregonian, the major daily newspaper in the Portland area, purchased The Hillsboro Argus, a community newspaper in Hillsboro, in 1999. Pamplin Media Group, who publishes the News-Times, a community paper in Forest Grove, launched the Hillsboro Tribune in August 2012 to compete with The Argus. In October 2012, the Oregonian Publishing Co. announced it would launch a newspaper in Forest Grove, the Leader. It had been rumored the prior month that the company would launch the paper.

The new, free publication started on October 17, 2012, and replaced the Courier, which had been a free Argus paper delivered to residents in western Washington County. The first issue was set to be mailed free to over 16,000 homes. The publisher planned to open a local office in Forest Grove after the Leader's debut and hire new employees while also using existing staff.

The move by the Leader’s owners was seen as payback for Pamplin’s move into Hillsboro, with the newspaper war focused on winning the Hillsboro market. The Hillsboro market had 93,455 residents compared to 21,488 for Forest Grove, and household spending on retail goods in Hillsboro was 154 percent of the state-wide figure while the same figure for Forest Grove was only 41.9 percent. The competition between the media companies in Washington County was the focus of a "Think Out Loud" segment on Oregon Public Broadcasting in November 2012. In January 2013, Samantha Swindler was named as the editor of the paper.

In December 2015, it was announced that the paper would be combined with the Beaverton Leader and the Hillsboro Argus to form the Washington County Argus. The successor paper lasted only 14 months, being discontinued in March 2017.

== Coverage ==
The paper was designed to provide hyperlocal coverage to Forest Grove, Banks, Gales Creek, Gaston, and parts of Cornelius. Stories would be posted online at OregonLive.com, which also hosts content from The Oregonian. Coverage included high school sports, education, Pacific University, government, and other local news in the Forest Grove area.
