= Reel M Inn =

Dive bar and restaurant in Portland, Oregon, U.S.

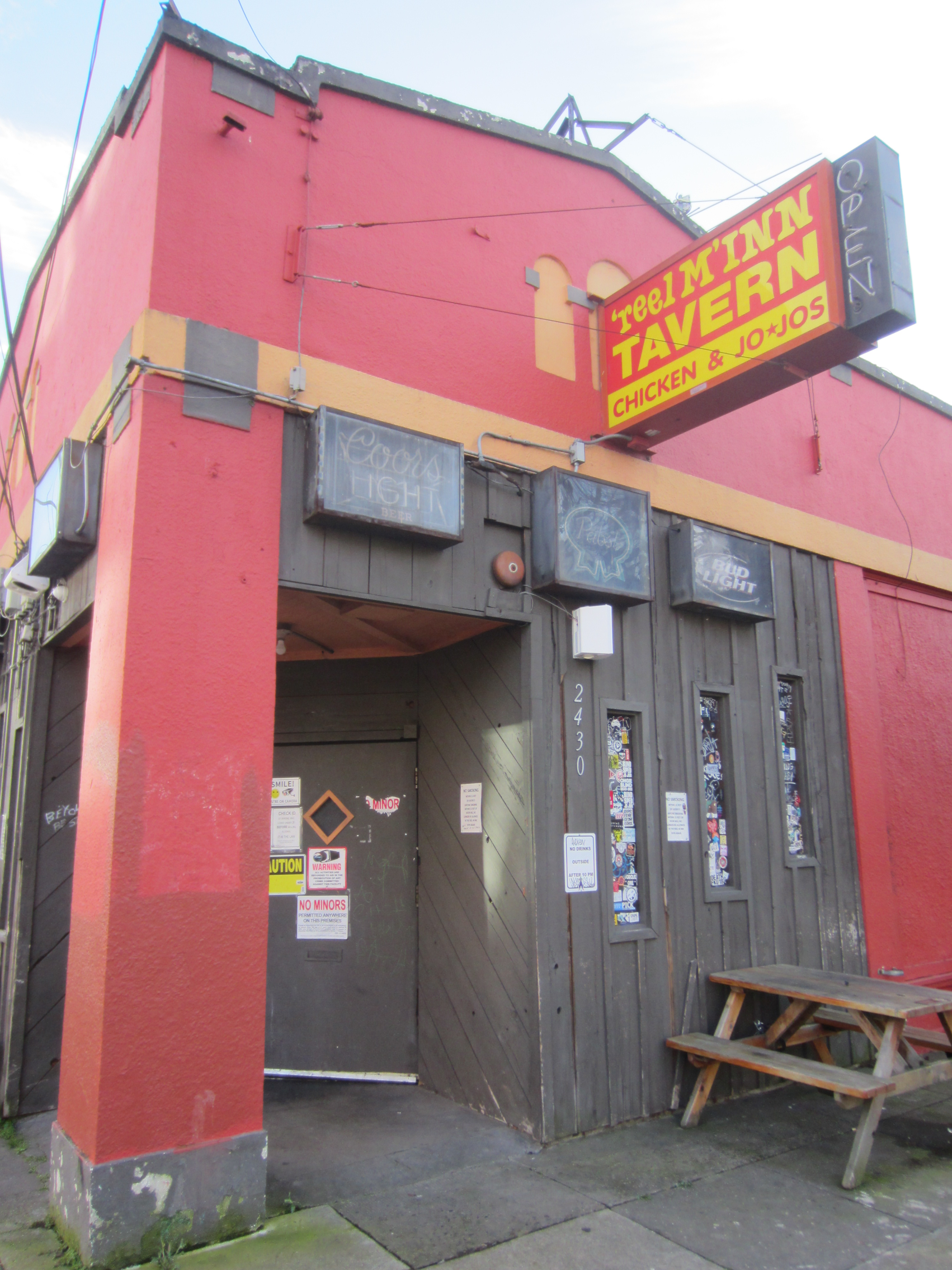
- The bar's front entrance in 2021
- Interactive map of Reel M Inn

Restaurant information
- Established: June 1994
- Owners: Paul Meno; Cathy Myers
- Previous owners: Bill and Sherri Purdy
- Manager: Carey Bolton
- Location: 2430 SE Division Street, Portland, Oregon, 97202, United States
- Coordinates: 45°30′17″N 122°38′26.3″W
- Website: reelminnpdx.com

Reel M Inn (stylized as 'reel M'INN), colloquially known as The Reel, is a dive bar and restaurant in Portland, Oregon's Hosford-Abernethy neighborhood, in the United States. Formerly known as the Lion's Den, Hogan's, and Spill M Inn, it was reopened under its current name in June 1994.

== Description ==
The dive bar Reel M Inn has a nautical theme with graffiti as decoration. The interior has poker machines. The bar has used a Flavor-Crisp pressure fryer. Menu options include fried chicken and jojos, as well as jalapeño poppers and pickle chips.

== History ==
After Bill and Sherri Purdy renovated Reel M Inn, it was opened in June 1994, in a space formerly hosting the Lion's Den, Hogan's, and Spill M Inn. Ownership was passed to Paul Meno and Cathy Myers in the late 1990s due to Bill's health problems. Although it was set to close at the end of 2018 due to an expiring lease, Alex Briggs and his wife Carey Bolton purchased Reel M Inn in April 2017. Meno and Myers are the current owners.

The bar closed temporarily in November 2020 during the COVID-19 pandemic. Reel M Inn opened for the Super Bowl in 2021, and reopened with limited hours on February 27, 2021. The business also applied for funding from the Restaurant Revitalization Fund during the pandemic.

Reel M Inn was featured on an episode of Hulu's Eater's Guide to the World.

== Reception ==
Andy Kryza included Reel M Inn in Thrillist's 2013 overview of Portland's best chicken and jojos. The website's Pete Cottell included the business in a 2019 overview of Portland's "most essential" dive bars. Reel M Inn ranked second in The Daily Meal's 2015 list of the nation's 25 best dive bars. The business was included in Bon Appétit's list of 22 "restaurants that turned us into dedicated regulars in 2018". Alexander Frane included Reel M Inn in Condé Nast Traveler's 2018 list of Portland's 13 best bars. Frane subsequently included the business in Portland Monthly's 2025 list of the city's "quintessential" dive bars.

In 2020, Willamette Week said the bar had "perilous restrooms and the best damn fried chicken in the city". In 2024, the newspaper's Andrew Jankowski opined, "One of a small handful of Portland’s crown jewels to come back from closing during the pandemic, Reel M Inn's chicken is still as juicy and mouthwatering as ever. The kitchen’s notoriously long wait time is unchanged, just like its flavor." Reel M Inn won in the Best Dive Bar category of Willamette Week's annual 'Best of Portland' readers' poll in 2025 and 2026. Brooke Jackson-Glidden included the chicken and jojos in Eater Portland's 2024 overview of "iconic Portland dishes". Elettra Pauletto selected Reel M Inn to represent Oregon in Tasting Table's 2025 list of the best dive bars in each U.S. state.

== See also ==
- List of dive bars
