= Eem (restaurant) =

Thai restaurant and cocktail bar in Portland, Oregon, U.S.

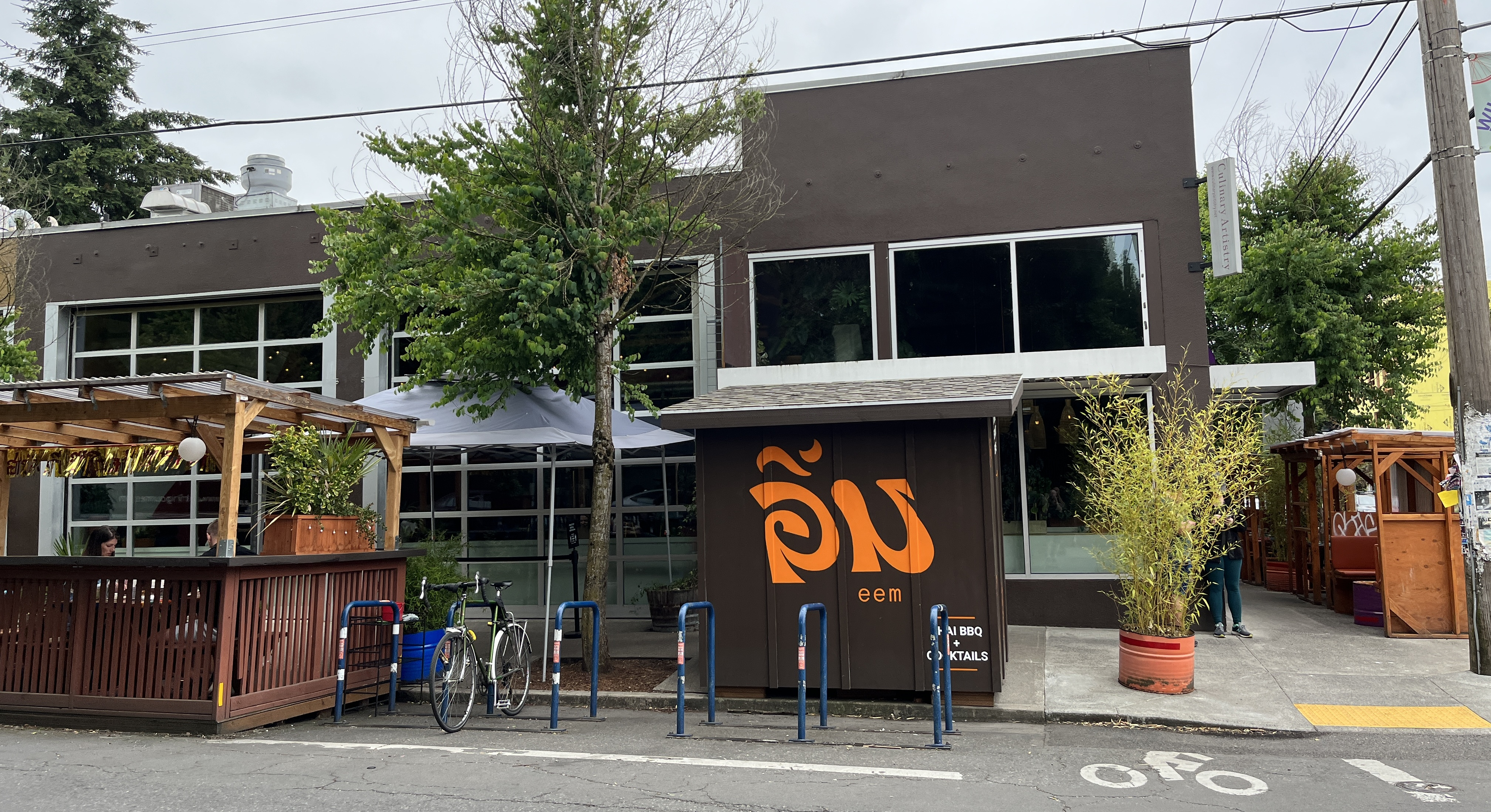
- The restaurant's exterior in 2022
- Interactive map of Eem

Restaurant information
- Location: 3808 North Williams Avenue, Portland, Oregon, 97227, United States
- Coordinates: 45°33′2.5″N 122°39′59.6″W
- Website: www.eempdx.com

Eem is a Thai barbecue restaurant and cocktail bar in Portland, Oregon, United States.

== Description ==
The Thai restaurant operates in the northeast Portland part of the Boise neighborhood.

== History ==
The restaurant used dining pods during the COVID-19 pandemic. Food critic Karen Brooks visited the restaurant for an episode of Hulu's Eater's Guide to the World.

== Reception ==
In 2019, The Oregonian and Portland Monthly named Eem the city's restaurant of the year. Brooke Jackson-Glidden included the white curry with brisket burnt ends in Eater Portland's 2024 overview of "iconic" Portland dishes. Katherine Chew Hamilton and Jackson-Glidden included Eem in the website's 2025 list of the city's best restaurants and food cart pods for large groups.

Eem won in the Best Thai Restaurant category of Willamette Week's annual 'Best of Portland' readers' poll in 2022, 2024, and 2025. The business was included in The Infatuation's 2024 list of Portland's best restaurants. In 2025, Eem ranked number 16 in a Yelp list of 50 restaurants serving the best fried chicken in the U.S. and Canada.

== See also ==
- List of Thai restaurants
