= Emma C. McKinney =

American newspaper publisher

Emma Carstens McKinney and her husband were the owners and publishers of The Hillsboro Argus in Washington County, Oregon. She bought a half share of the ownership in April 1904. W. Verne, her son, bought the other half in 1923, leading to the birth of McKinney&McKinney.

The daughter of F. J. and Henrietta (Deelwater) Carstens, she was a native of Washington County and was one of eight children. She married W. William McKinney in 1886. Emma McKinney died in 1964.

McKinney received the Amos Voorhies Award, Oregon's most prestigious newspaper award, in 1957. In 1982, she was inducted into the Oregon Journalism Hall of Fame.

The Emma C. McKinney Award was established in National Newspaper Association 966 to honor a journalist, working or retired, "who has provided distinguished service and leadership to the community press and their community". It is considered one of the "highest and most dignified tributes in journalism".
