= News-Times (Forest Grove) =

Weekly newspaper published in Forest Grove, Oregon

Forest Grove News-Times

- Type: Weekly newspaper
- Format: Tabloid
- Owner: Carpenter Media Group
- Publisher: Nikki DeBuse
- Editor: Mark Miller
- Founded: 1886
- Language: English
- Headquarters: 2038 Pacific Avenue; Forest Grove, Oregon
- Circulation: 7,621 (as of 2022)
- ISSN: 1042-8518
- Website: forestgrovenewstimes.com

The News-Times is a weekly newspaper covering the cities of Forest Grove and Hillsboro in the U.S. state of Oregon. Established in 1886 and with coverage focused on Forest Grove for most of its history, the paper expanded coverage to Hillsboro, when, in August 2019, its then-owner the Pamplin Media Group launched a separate Hillsboro edition of the News-Times to replace the Hillsboro Tribune. The News-Times is published on Wednesdays. Since 2024, the paper has been owned by the Carpenter Media Group, which publishes other community newspapers in the Portland metropolitan area.

== History ==
The Forest Grove Times was first published in 1886 by the Forest Grove Printing Company. J. B. Eddy assumed control of the paper around 1889. A. Rogers, possibly a local pastor, took over management of the Times in 1891. At some point the Times absorbed the nearby Hillsboro Democrat.

In 1896, J. Wheelock Marsh sold the Times to Austin Craig, who merged his Washington County Hatchet with it to form the Washington County Hatchet and Forest Grove Times. He retired in 1899 and the new owners, George H. Himes and R. H. Pratt, shortened the name to the Times. The paper soon came under the ownership of Marsh again, who in 1901 sold it to Walter Hodge. Hodge operated it for five years until 1906 when the paper was purchased by W. H. Porter and W. T. Fogle.

In 1909, Gerald Volk bought the plant and consolidated the Times into the Washington County News. A. E. Nourse had been connected to the paper for seven years when in 1910 he sold his half-interest in the News to A. C. Alexander. In 1911, A. E. Scott bought out Gerald Volk and changed the paper's name to the Washington County News-Times.

In 1922, Scott sold the printing plant to W. J. Clark but retained ownership of the News-Times. Scott died in 1924 and the new proprietors were Earl C. Brownlee and George H. Bennett. In 1928, C. J. Gillette and Hugh McGilvra bought the News-Times from Brownlee.

In 1980, McGilvra sold his papers to The Guard Publishing Co., which published The Register-Guard. Five years later the company entered an agreement with Eagle Newspapers to manage its five weekly newspapers in Washington County. In 1987, Eagle Newspapers and The Guard Publishing Co., merged their newspapers near Portland to create a new joint venture, which was called Community Newspapers, Inc. The business was sold to Steve Clark in 1996. In August 2000, Community Newspapers was acquired by Pamplin Communications, passing ownership of the News-Times to Pamplin Media Group.

The News-Times' Hillsboro edition (noted in the masthead), on its first day of publication, August 14, 2019

Pamplin Media Group launched the Hillsboro Tribune in nearby Hillsboro in September 2012, which then competed with The Hillsboro Argus. The Argus' publisher then launched the Forest Grove Leader in October 2012. The News-Times' publisher claimed the launch of the second Forest Grove newspaper was retaliation for starting the Hillsboro paper. The competition between the media companies was the focus of a "Think Out Loud" segment on Oregon Public Broadcasting in November 2012 featuring News-Times publisher John Schrag. The Argus and Leader were later merged into a single paper called the Washington County Argus, which ceased publication in 2017.

In August 2019, owner Pamplin Media announced that a new Hillsboro edition of the News-Times would be launched on August 14, replacing the Pamplin-owned Hillsboro Tribune, which had been in publication since 2012. The final newsprint edition under the Tribune name was published on August 7, 2019, and the first "Hillsboro Edition" of the News-Times was published on August 14, 2019. The two papers were already owned by the same company, and had been operating out of the same office in Forest Grove since the Tribune's inception.

In June 2024, Robert B. Pamplin Jr. sold his newspaper company, including the News-Times, to Carpenter Media Group.
