= Mary Clarke =

Mary Clarke may refer to:

- Mary Anne Clarke (1776–1852), mistress of Frederick, Duke of York
- Mary Basset or Mary Clarke (c. 1523–1572), English translator
- Mary Bassett Clarke (1831–1908), American writer
- Mary Bayard Devereux Clarke (1827–1886), American writer, poet, and photographer
- Mary Clarke, birth name of Mary Champion de Crespigny (c. 1749–1812), English novelist and letter writer
- Mary Clarke (dance critic) (1923–2015), British journalist and dance critic
- Mary Clarke (letter writer) (?–1705), English gentlewoman and letter writer
- Mary Clarke Nind (1825–1905), English-born American philanthropist and worker for social justice
- Mary Cowden Clarke (1809–1898), British author
- Mary E. Clarke (1924–2011), American military officer
- Mary Elizabeth Mohl née Clarke (1793–1883), British socialite
- Mary Ellen Pollard Clarke (1862–1939), American suffragist
- Mary Frances Clarke (1803–1887), foundress of the Sisters of Charity of the Blessed Virgin Mary
- Mary H. Gray Clarke (1835–1892), American author, correspondent, and poet
- Mary Horgan Mowbray-Clarke (1874–1962), American art critic, writer, publisher, instructor, and landscape architect
- Mary Jane Clarke, (1862–1910), British suffragette
- Mary Pat Clarke (1941–2024), American politician
- Mother Antonia née Mary Clarke (1926–2013), American Catholic nun and activist

== See also ==
- Maree Clarke (born 1961), Australian artist
- Mary Clark (disambiguation)
- Victoria Mary Clarke (born 1966), Irish journalist and writer
