= British Overseas Restaurant Corporation =

Defunct restaurant in Portland, Oregon, US

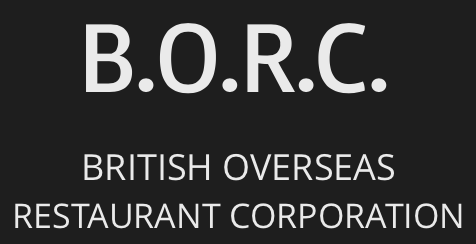
- Interactive map of British Overseas Restaurant Corporation

Restaurant information
- Established: March 2016
- Closed: February 2019
- Location: 4120 N. Williams Avenue, Portland, Multnomah, Oregon, 97217
- Coordinates: 45.55369°N 122.66653°W
- Seating capacity: 50
- Website: britishoverseasrestaurant.com

British Overseas Restaurant Corporation (B.O.R.C., or BORC), previously Saffron Colonial, was a restaurant in north Portland, Oregon, in the United States. The restaurant opened in the Boise neighborhood in March 2016, but changed its name to British Overseas Restaurant Corporation the following month in response to protests over its name and menu. The restaurant closed in February 2019.

== Description ==
Saffron Colonial was in Portland's historically African American Boise neighborhood. The cafe held up to fifty patrons and served "English food from the colonies of the British Empire". The menu included the Plantation Punch, the Tortolan Plantation Press, and the Winston Churchill Breakfast.

== History ==
Saffron Colonial was established in March 2016 by Sally Krantz, a native resident who had an interest in historical recipes and operated a chain of bakeries in Hong Kong called Saffron Bakery.

Following public criticism and pressure, the restaurant's name was changed to British Overseas Restaurant Corporation (BORC), a play on the former airline British Overseas Airways Corporation (BOAC), in April 2016. Protesters had held a Stop Romanticizing Colonialism! march on March 19. Krantz said the demonstrations were "nonsense".

The restaurant launched dinner and high tea in mid 2016.

In February 2019, BORC closed its doors, reopening for several months as Fika, "a cafe and co-op from the same owner inspired by Swedish-style teatime." Fika closed six months later in August 2019. Michaela McVetty opened Sisters Gourmet Deli in the space, but said her business suffered because of the previous owner's reputation.

== Reception ==
Upon its opening, the restaurant was criticized for its name and menu because of their associations with English colonialism. Krantz responded:

For me, it's about the cultural melding of food around the world, focusing on how England has transformed and affected cuisine where they've been present, be it America, India or Sri Lanka ... A lot of people are confused. Colonial is used on a lot of things: to describe a period of time with food, architecture and literature...It seems like some people have confused that word with American slavery ... Take a dish like kedgeree which is still eaten in London. The only reason we have it is because Englishmen went to India with the East India Company...I'm really interested in history and how all societies affect others. It's not always good, but it's not always bad either.
