= Stanley Gordon Sturges =

American physician and missionary (1929–2019)

- Born: October 14, 1929; Congo
- Died: July 12, 2019 (aged 89); Portland, Oregon
- Education: Pacific Union College ’50, Loma Linda College of Medical Evangelists ’55
- Occupation: Seventh-Day Adventist Medical Missionary
- Honours: 1961 Ten Outstanding Young Americans

Stanley Gordon Sturges (October 14, 1929 – July 12, 2019) was an American physician and missionary. He and his wife Raylene Sturges were the first Seventh-day Adventist medical missionaries to Nepal in 1957. They founded the Scheer Memorial Hospital in Banepa, which is the only Western hospital in Kavre District and serves half a million people. In 1961, the US Junior Chamber of Commerce named Sturges one of Ten Outstanding Young Americans.

Sturges came from a strong tradition of medical missionary work in his family, and his goal was to minister to the needs of the sick and needy disregarding their social or economic position. It was illegal to openly speak and preach Christianity in Nepal at the time, so patients would come into contact with Sturges’ religion through the hospital.

== Family, education, and early life ==
Sturges was born in Congo on October 14, 1929, to medical missionary parents. His father, Dr. J. Hubert Sturges had a medical practice for the Seventh-Day Adventist Church in Congo. He had an older brother, Dr. Hubert F. Sturges who opened a missionary practice in Ethiopia and a younger brother, Dr. Keith W. Sturges who eventually took over the Scheer Memorial Hospital. His sister, Elizabeth Taylor was also a medical missionary in Kenya.

Sturges grew up in California where he and his brothers were taught manual work, such as carpentry and painting. Sturges later wrote that education was a priority in his family and that mission work was his goal from childhood.

He received a B.A. (1951) from Pacific Union College, where he was the student body president. Later, he enrolled at Loma Linda University Medical School as a medical student. While in medical school, he met and married Raylene Duncan, a nurse who shared his interest in missions.

=== Volleyball ===
Sturges played for the 1955 Loma Linda university volleyball team that went on to win second place at the national championship. It was the only organized sports program the university ever had. After beating big-name universities in the Los Angeles area and qualifying for the National Tournament, his team came within 2 points of winning the national championship against Florida State University. Sturges was named to the 1955 All-American team for the Collegiate Division.

== Medical mission ==
=== Banepa practice ===
Having completed his internship, Sturges, his wife, and their three children, left for the mission field in 1957. First they went to India to study the language, and then went on to Nepal. The Seventh Day Adventist Church supported their mission, and Sturges later wrote in his autobiography that his “motivation to enter mission service centered chiefly in the desire to witness in a practical way to the love of Christ for all.”

Sturges originally planned to open a practice in Kathmandu, but didn't want to threaten the United Medical Mission already serving there, so he looked 16 miles east to Banepa. Back then, Banepa was a district center of nearly a 1/4 million people without regular service of a doctor. It was the hub of three trade routes converging on the Valley of Seven Cities, also known as the Kathmandu Valley. When he passed through the city, headsman and 10,000 of local tribesman staged a demonstration for Sturges to choose the city for his practice.

The first clinic was opened in a run-down second-floor rented room. Problems plagued the practice, such as the shortage of medicine supply and reluctance of people to come in. Sturges hired more staff and eventually started treating up to 100 patients daily. His wife often helped out and filled in for Sturges when he wasn't around.

=== Scheer Memorial Hospital ===
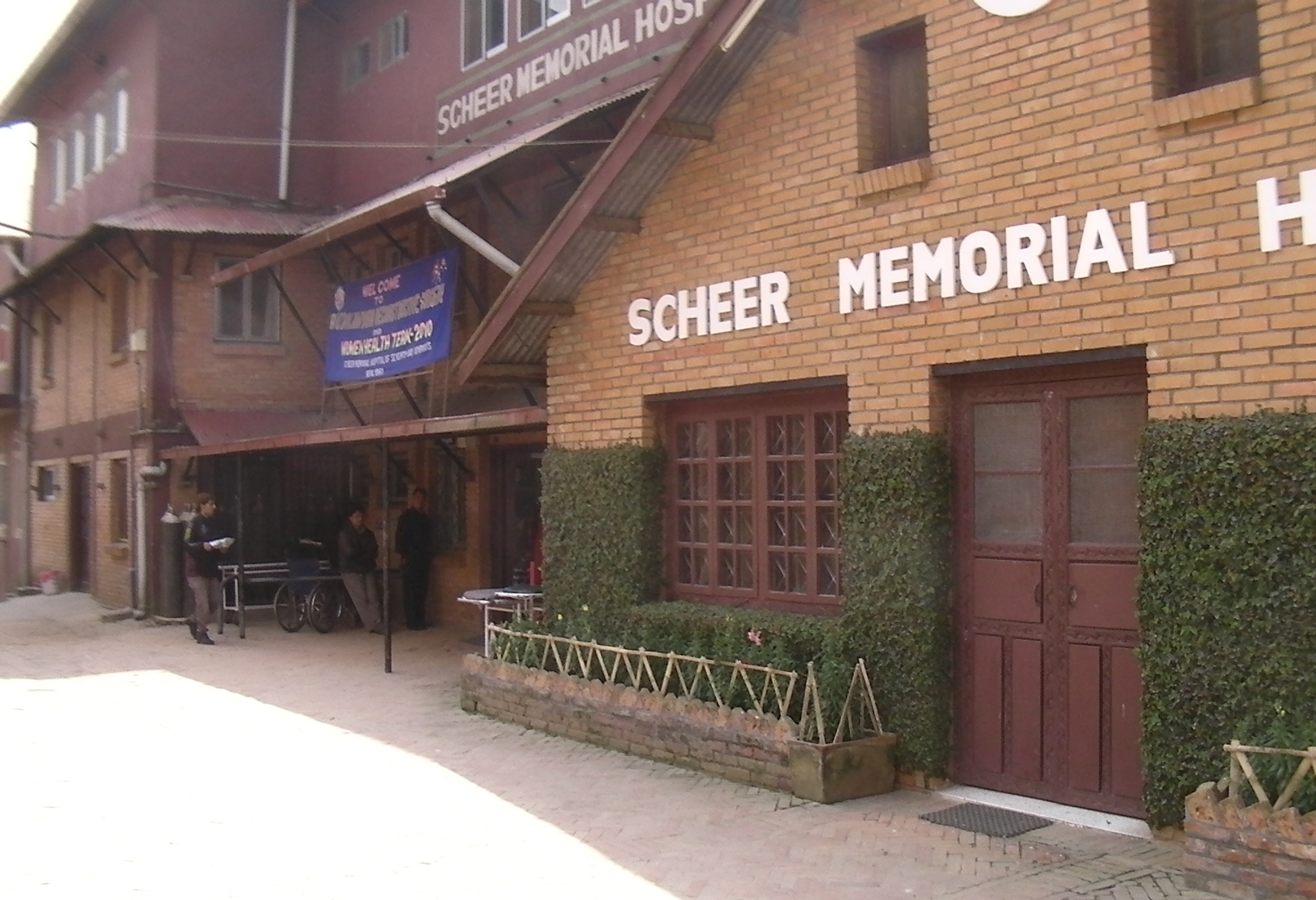
Scheer Memorial Hospital in Banepa, Nepal

Through the alumni network at Loma Linda University, Sturges contacted Clifford C. Scheer, a construction consultant in New Jersey who was thinking about constructing a memorial for his recently deceased parents. Scheer donated $25,000 for the creation of the Carolyn and Charles J. Scheer Memorial Hospital of Seventh-Day Adventists.

Sturges and community members built the hospital themselves over one and a half years. It was officially opened and dedicated in a ceremony on May 18, 1959, which was attended by former Prime Minister BP Koirala, the Minister of Health, and 3,000 townsmen.

The hospital, originally a 20-bed facility serving 100 patients daily, has now evolved into a three-story, 150-bed facility. It has also since established the Scheer Memorial Adventists Hospital Medical Institute, College of Nursing where students can earn a B.Sc. Nursing degree and get clinical practice.

Because of the abundance of patients, Sturges also opened mobile clinics in Panauti and Dapcha Chhaatrebangh on different days of the week.

=== Problems encountered ===
Sturges treated a range of diseases, including cholera, tuberculosis, elephantiasis, malaria, typhoid, and smallpox. In addition to the lack of electricity and modern tools, Sturges faced widespread taboos in the village. such as how male physicians couldn't examine women.

A local pressed charges against Sturges and the hospital, insinuating that the hospital blocked a nearby holy water source, destroyed a path connecting Banepa to Chandeswori, overcharged for services, preached the Christian religion openly, and that Sturges was guilty of malpractice. The village people, however, rebuked his charges and laughed him out of court.

== Legacy ==
In 1961, Sturges was named one of America's Outstanding Young Men by the US Junior Chamber of Commerce. The ceremony was broadcast on national television on January 20, 1961, and Sturges appeared on the Ed Sullivan show, the Today show, and met President Richard Nixon. He was also featured in Life Magazine’s September 14, 1962 special issue of “100 Outstanding Members of the Take-Over Generation."

Sturges received the American Academy of Achievement Golden Plate Award in 1965 and the Pacific Union College Honored Alumnus Award in 2016.

== Personal life ==
Sturges had five children (Cheri, Stan Jr., Charlene, Jim and Mark) with Raylene Sturges. His fourth child, Jim, was delivered in a Land Rover on the way to Kathmandu in 1960.

Sturges and his wife were very involved in the Seventh Day Adventist Church. Sturges contributed to their quarterly journal, writing a piece titled “Ellen White’s Authority and the Church” in the summer 1972 issue.

Upon returning to the United States, Sturges was an instructor in psychiatry at the University of Cincinnati before retiring in Portland, Oregon. During retirement, he was affiliated with the Adventist Medical Center-Portland, and Legacy Good Samaritan Medical Center.

Following the death of his wife in 2018, he moved to a Portland, Oregon retirement home. He died on July 12, 2019
