= Hillsboro Tribune =

Weekly newspaper published in Hillsboro, Oregon

- Type: Weekly newspaper
- Format: Broadsheet
- Owner: Pamplin Media Group
- Publisher: Nikki DeBuse
- Founded: 2012
- Ceased publication: 2019
- City: Hillsboro, Oregon, U.S.
- Sister newspapers: News-Times (Forest Grove)
- Website: hillsboronewstimes.com

The Hillsboro Tribune was a weekly newspaper that covered the city of Hillsboro in the U.S. state of Oregon and was published from 2012 to 2019. It was replaced in 2019 by a Hillsboro edition of the Forest Grove News-Times, a sister publication.

Owned by the Pamplin Media Group, the newspaper published its first issue on September 7, 2012. It was Pamplin's first new paper since 2001, when the company started the Portland Tribune, and was designed to complement its other local papers in the Portland metropolitan area. The Tribune competed with the now-defunct Hillsboro Argus, which was published by Advance Publications, which also publishes The Oregonian that competes with the Portland Tribune. John Schrag served as the first publisher, with Kevin Harden, Jim Redden, and Jennifer Anderson as the news team. Pamplin distributed the paper free at newsstands in the Hillsboro and Aloha areas, as well as via home delivery with a paid subscription. For most of the paper's history, the weekly newsprint edition was published on Fridays, but this was changed to Wednesdays in February 2018.

In August 2019, the paper's publisher announced that the Tribune would be replaced by a Hillsboro edition of its sister paper, the News-Times of Forest Grove, and no longer be published under the Hillsboro Tribune title. The final newsprint edition under the Tribune name was that of August 7, 2019.

== History ==
Pamplin announced the launch of the new newspaper on August 21, 2012, in the News-Times of Forest Grove. Hillsboro last had two newspapers in 1932, at which time the owner of the Argus purchased the Washington Independent and merged the papers. The Tribune was originally published biweekly, but at the time of its launch its owners were already hoping to expand to weekly publication, and this was goal achieved in March 2013.

The first edition of the newspaper published on Friday, September 7, 2012, included stories covering the planned Hillsboro baseball stadium, STEM programs (science, technology, engineering, and mathematics) in local schools, and exploring Hillsboro and the county's economic impact upon the larger metropolitan area. The cover story dealt with money the State of Oregon owed to Washington County being held-up by a potential glitch in a law. This inaugural edition was mailed to 7,000 residents, with other copies available at green newspaper boxes in the local area, primarily at businesses. Pamplin would distribute the paper free at newsstands in the Hillsboro and Aloha areas, as well as via home delivery with a subscription.

The month after the Tribune's launch, the publishers of the Argus launched the Forest Grove Leader to compete with the News-Times in neighboring Forest Grove, which was published by the same company as the Tribune. The publisher for the Tribune and News-Times stated he thought the new paper in Forest Grove was retaliation for the launch of the Tribune. The initial period of biweekly publication ended in March 2013, when the paper became a weekly. At the same time, original editor Kevin Harden left for a different position with Pamplin Media Group, the Tribune's owner, and Nancy Townsley became the paper's managing editor. The Tribune won three awards in its category in 2014 from the Society of Professional Journalists' Northwest Excellence in Journalism contest for its 2013 coverage. Nikki DeBuse became the paper's publisher on February 1, 2016, succeeding John Schrag.

Free subscriptions to the Tribune, delivered by mail, were introduced experimentally in early 2017. This service lasted about one year, being discontinued in early February 2018 and replaced by a return to paid subscriptions for readers wanting home delivery. The paper continued to be free at newsstands.

After five years of being published on Fridays, the weekly paper's publication date was moved to Wednesdays effective February 7, 2018. Prior to this change, each weekly edition had to be readied for printing two days before publication, effectively delaying the Tribune's print-edition reporting of Wednesday and Thursday news by a week, because the Hillsboro Tribune needed to be printed on Tuesday nights in order to fit into the printing schedule at Pamplin's press in Gresham, Oregon, where many other Pamplin newspapers are printed. The printing schedule was unchanged, but the move to Wednesday publication meant that paper was now distributed only hours after being printed.

In August 2019, Pamplin Media announced that the Tribune would be replaced by a Hillsboro edition of its sister paper, the News-Times, of Forest Grove, and no longer be published under the Hillsboro Tribune title. The final newsprint edition under the Tribune name was that of August 7, 2019.
