= J. Mary Taylor =

American mammalogist and university teacher (1931–2019)

- Born: May 30, 1931; Portland, Oregon
- Died: February 15, 2019 (aged 87); Portland, Oregon
- Scientific career
- Fields: Mammalogy
- Institutions: Wellesley College; University of British Columbia; Oregon National Primate Research Center; Cleveland Museum of Natural History

Jocelyn Mary Taylor (May 30, 1931 – February 15, 2019) was an American mammalogist, who served as president of the American Society of Mammalogists from 1982 to 1984. She was also an honorary trustee of the Cleveland Museum of Natural History. As a pioneer for women in the field of mammalogy, Taylor actively worked to broaden the study, doing so as a member of the American Society of Mammalogists, as a university professor, and through conducting her research, publishing numerous works.

== Early life and education ==
J. Mary Taylor was born on May 30, 1931, in Portland, Oregon, to Kathleen and Arnold L. Taylor. She stopped using her first given name as a child. Kathleen Taylor was an accomplished violinist and taught her daughter to play the violin and piano. Aside from music lessons, Taylor often took long walks outside with her mother, learning about the plants and animals her area, inspiring her love of biology. Taylor was an active competitor in tennis, participating in the prestigious British junior circuit at age 17. Taylor attended Smith College in Northampton in 1948 with the intention studying music. She switched her major to zoology and graduated with her honours thesis is protozoology in 1952. She attended the University of California at Berkeley in 1952 to work under Harold Kirby, receiving a Fulbright Fellowship in 1954 Taylor did her doctoral work at the Museum of Vertebrate Zoology on protozoan parasites of Peromyscus mice, and completed it in four years. She graduated with her doctoral degree in mammalogy from the University of California at Berkeley in 1959.

== Career ==
Immediately after her work as a graduate student, Taylor became an active teacher at the Connecticut college for women within the Biology Department. In 1954, following this teaching job, Taylor moved to Sydney, Australia to study the bush rat (Rattus assimilis). By the early 1960s, Taylor became an instructor at Wellesley College in Wellesley, Massachusetts. It was here that she worked alongside Graduate and Master's students. She published several papers on Australian mammals and reproduction in marsupials. By 1965, Taylor was supervising doctoral students at the Cowan Vertebrate Museum. It was here that she taught field courses and lead a research-based program. In that same year, the University of British Columbia (UBC) offered Taylor a position as an associate professor. With this job title, she also earned the title of the first woman to hold a professional position in the Biology Department at the University of British Columbia.

Taylor resigned from UBC in 1982 and became a researchers at the Oregon National Primate Research Center and an honorary professor at Oregon State University. The same year she was elected as the first woman president of the American Society of Mammalogists. In 1987 she became the first woman director of the Cleveland Museum of Natural History in Ohio.

She was awarded Killam Senior Fellowship in 1978 and the Hartley H.T. Jackson Award in 1993.

== Personal life ==
Shortly after becoming a professor at the University of British Columbia, Taylor married Dr. Joseph William Kamp, an entomologist. Kamp was diagnosed with cancer and Taylor's mother broke her hip in 1982, forcing her to leave her teaching job after 17 years and return to the United States. During the period of time where Taylor's family members struggled with their health, she worked on publishing research papers, including a field guide to the terrestrial and marine animals of Australia. In 1990, her mother and husband died.

== Published works ==
- Calaby, J.H. & Taylor, J.M. (1981). Reproduction in two marsupial-mice, Antechinus bellus and A. bilarni (Dasyuridae) of Tropical Australia. Journal of Mammalogy, 62(2), 329–341.
- Horner, E.B., & Taylor, J.M. (1959). Results of the Archbold Expedition. No. 80 Observations on the Biology of the Yellow-footed Marsupial Mouse, Antechinus flavipes flavipes. American Museum Novitates. 1972(1), 1-24.
- Horner, E.B., Taylor, J.M., & Padykula, H.A. (1965). Food habits and gastric morphology of the grasshopper mouse. Journal of Mammalogy, 45(4), 513–535.
- Horner, E.B. & Taylor, J.M. (1968) Growth and reproductive behavior in the southern grasshopper mouse. Journal of Mammalogy, 49(4), 644–660.
- Horner, E.B., Taylor, M.J., Linzey, A.V., & Michener, G.R. (1996). Women in Mammalogy (1940–1994): Personal Perspectives. Journal of Mammalogy, 77(3), 655–674.
- Taylor, J.M. (1961). Reproductive Biology of the American bush rat: Rattus assimilis. University of California Publications in Zoology, 60(1).
- Taylor, J.M. (1968). Reproductive mechanisms of the female southern grasshopper mouse, Onychomys Torridus Longicaudus. Journal of Mammalogy, 49(2), 303–309.
- Taylor, J.M. & Horner, E.B. (1970). Gonadal activity in the marsupial mouse, Antechinus Bellus, with notes on other species of the genus (Marsupialia: Dasyuridae). Journal of Mammalogy, 51(4), 659–668.
- Taylor, J.M. (1984) The Oxford Guide to Mammals of Australia. Michigan: Oxford University Press.
