= Southeast Grind =

Defunct coffeehouse in Portland, Oregon, U.S.

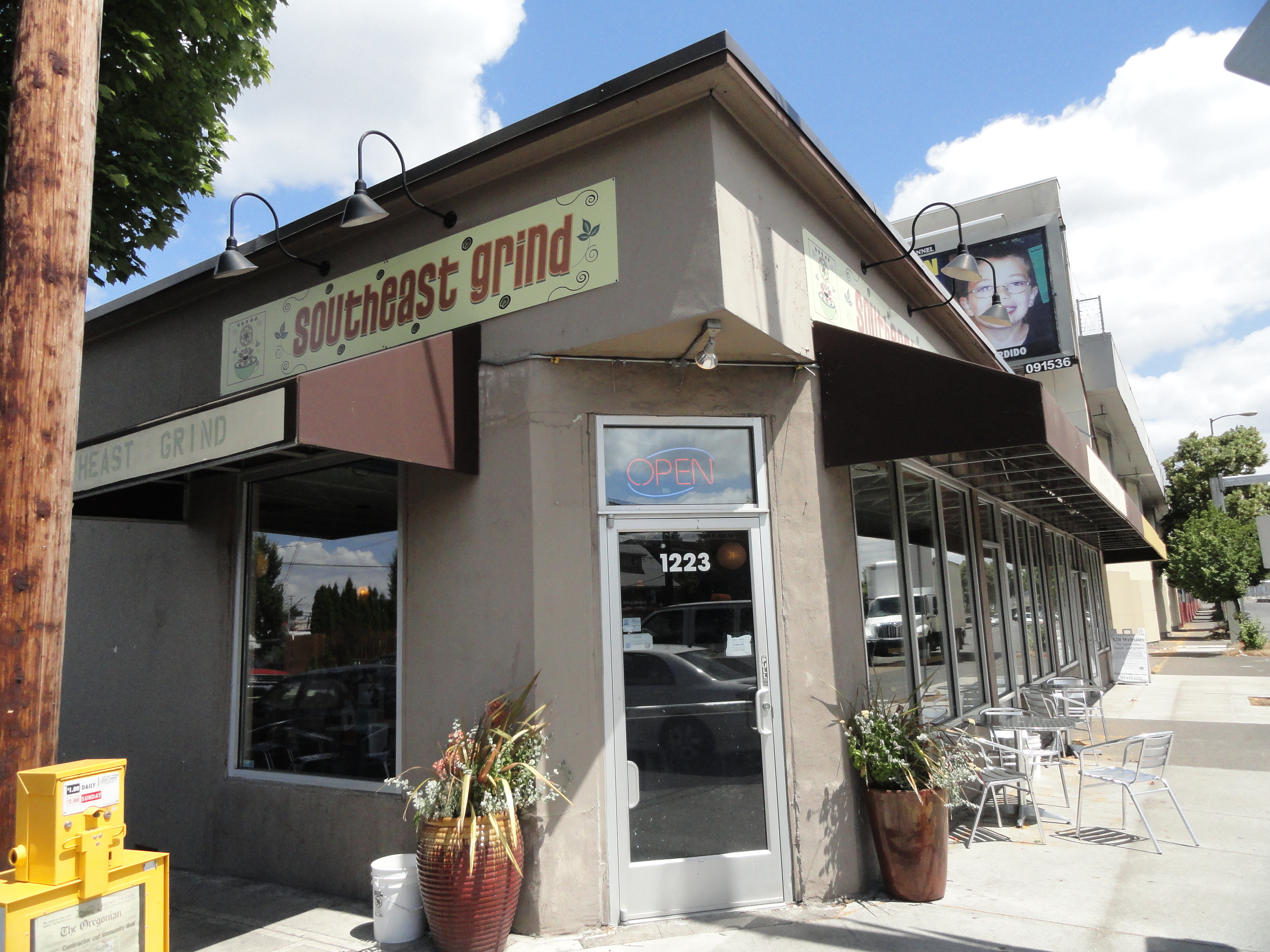
- The coffeehouse's exterior in 2010
- Interactive map of Southeast Grind

Restaurant information
- Established: 2009
- Closed: October 26, 2019
- Owner: Kacey Birch
- Location: 1223 Southeast Powell Blvd., Portland, Multnomah, Oregon, 97202
- Coordinates: 45.5010°N 122.6524°W

Southeast Grind was a coffeehouse in Portland, Oregon's Hosford-Abernethy neighborhood, in the United States. Opened by owner Kacey Birch in 2009, Southeast Grind was the city's only coffee shop operating 24 hours a day, as of 2019. Besides coffee and espresso drinks, the coffeehouse served juices, smoothies, teas, pastries, quesadillas, salads, sandwiches, and other snacks. Southeast Grind was described as a "safe, reliable spot", a "living room", and a "respite" for a diverse clientele, especially students. It closed in October 2019 because of lease issues, renovations required to address the building's structural problems and Birch's desire to focus on family.

== Description ==
Southeast Grind, located along Powell Boulevard in southeast Portland's Hosford-Abernethy neighborhood, operated as the city's only around-the-clock coffeehouse, as of 2019. USA Today said the coffee shop offered Wi-Fi at no cost and had a "laid-back setting, complete with oversized couches, a fireplace and outdoor patio seating". Southeast Grind had a "pine-lodge rustic" atmosphere, according to Insiders' Guide to Portland author Rachel Dresbeck. The menu had coffee and espresso drinks, juices, smoothies and teas. Food options included bagels, doughnuts, pastries, quesadillas, salads, sandwiches, and other snacks, with gluten-free and vegan choices. The Night Rider had coffee, two espresso shots, and white chocolate. Another drink was called the Charging Tiger.

In 2017, Jenna Rossiter of The Beacon described Southeast Grind as a "hipster" coffeehouse. Rita A. Leonard of The Bee described Southeast Grind in 2019 as "a unique, safe, reliable spot to come at any time for coffee, healthful snacks, music, and uninterrupted wifi Internet service, in a comfortable laid-back atmosphere, year 'round". She added, "The site was known for its well-worn charm, serving as a sort of living room for students and patrons to working on laptops at all hours. Anyone who made a purchase there was welcome to stay as long as they liked... It was a special place for night owls who needed somewhere to gather and finish up last-minute classwork and projects". Leonard also noted the presence of a community bulletin board and space for local businesses to promote events."

In 2020, Willamette Week's Shannon Gormley said, "In the era of white-walled third wave coffee shops, Southeast Grind retained a well-worn charm, complete with slouching armchairs and worn couches, and served as a living room of sorts for college students and addled patrons working on their laptops late into the night." Eater Portland's Brooke Jackson-Glidden called the coffeehouse "a respite for everyone from college students to dancers at local strip clubs, as well as homeless residents around Portland", and a "home to Reedies, industry workers, and other night owls looking for a caffeine buzz and a place to work or relax".

== History ==
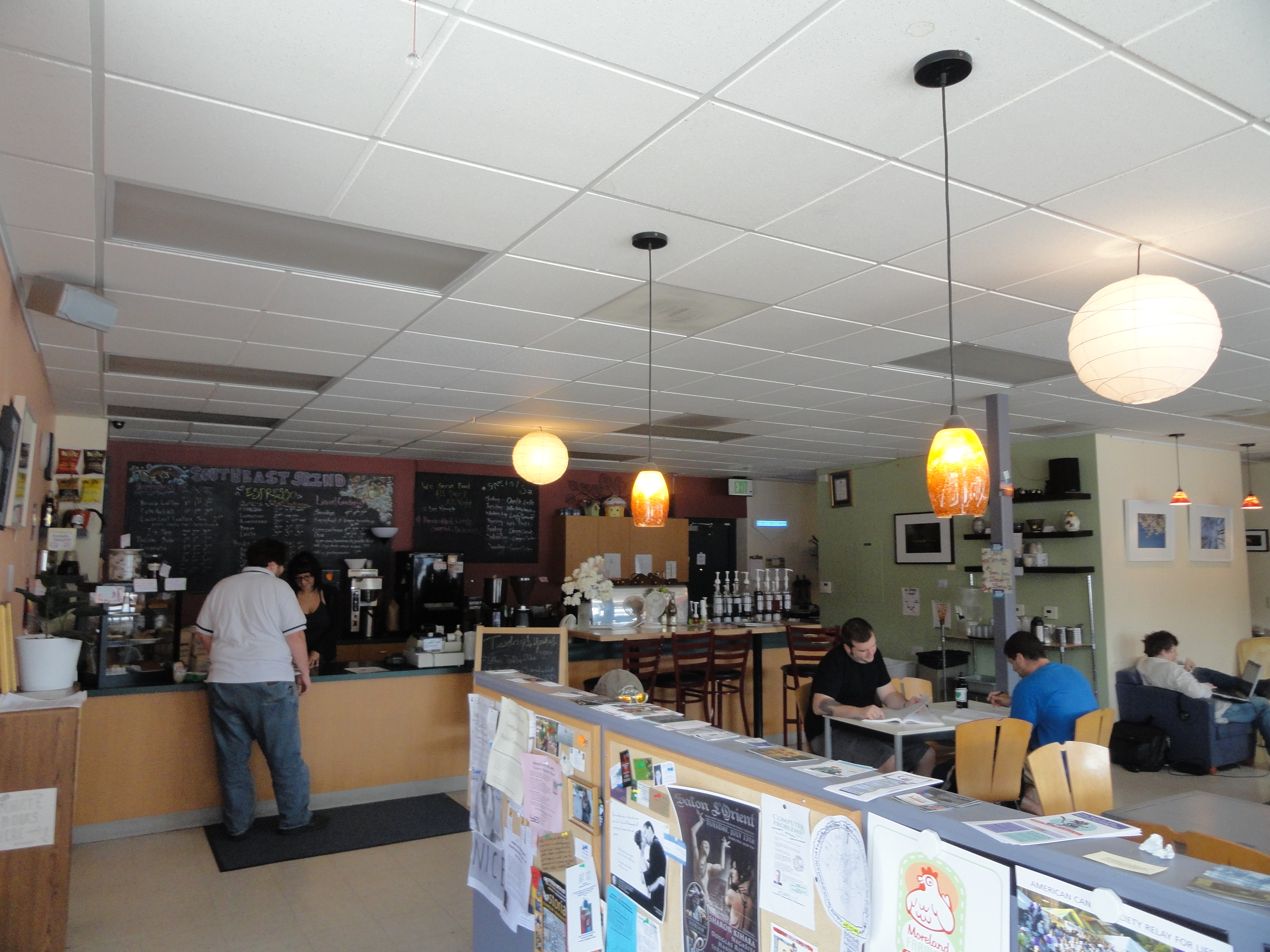
The front counter in 2010

Kacey Birch opened Southeast Grind the 2009. She later met her husband at the shop.

In mid-October 2019, staff confirmed plans to close, writing: "With much gratitude and a heavy heart, we are closing our doors. It's been a wonderful decade and we feel so honored to be your baristas. Come on in this last week to say goodbye. We appreciate you all and wish you well!" Following the announcement of the pending closure, hundreds of people visited for one last time. The coffeehouse closed with a party on October 26, 2019. Birch cited a lack of a lease for six years and the building's structural problems as reasons for the closure. Unable to take on the needed renovations, she elected to spend more time with her family. Phoenix Roasters filled the void and began operating around-the-clock starting on Halloween (October 31).

== Reception ==
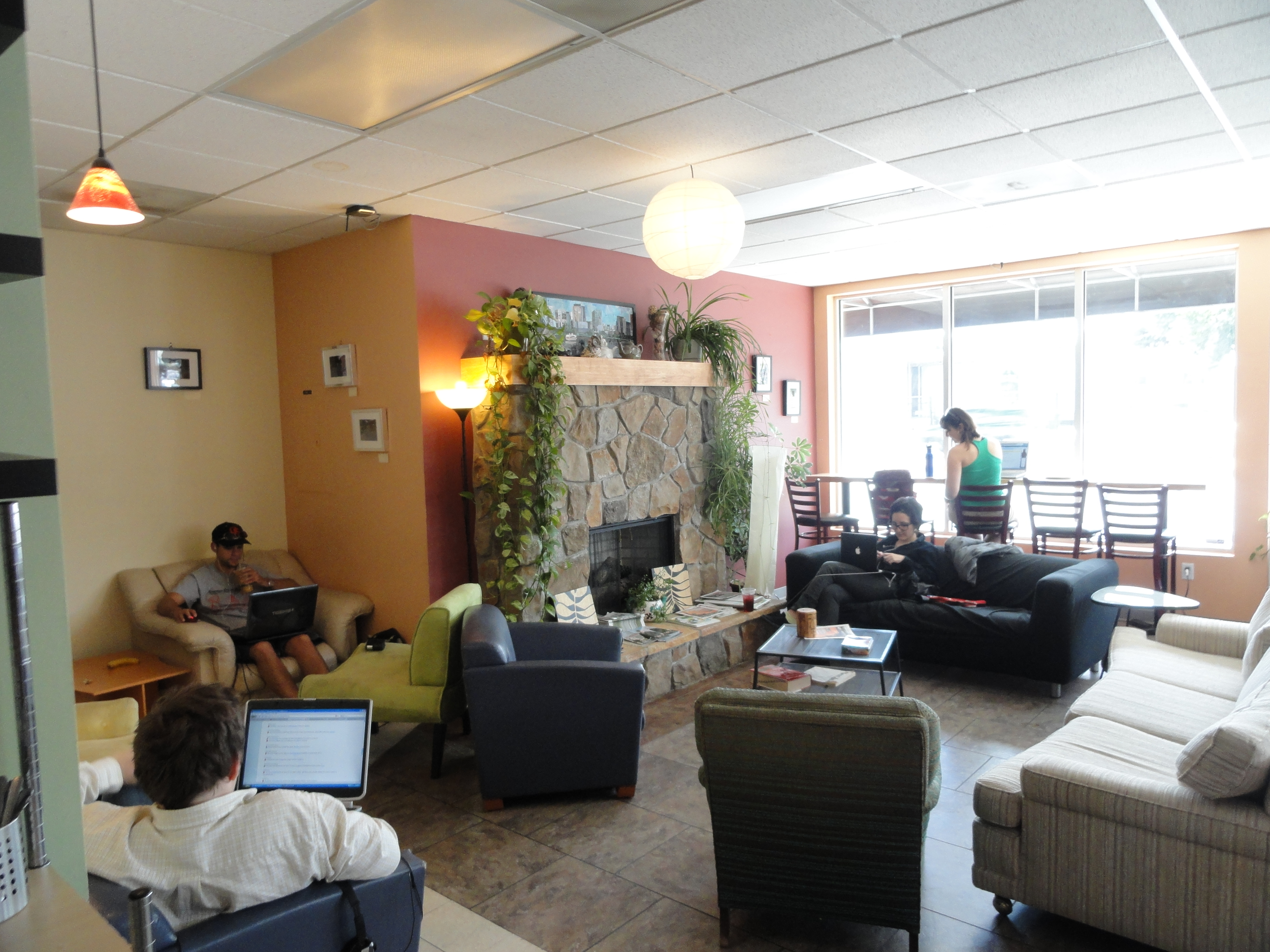
The coffeehouse's interior, 2010

Writing for Willamette Week in 2015, Pete Cottell included Southeast Grind in the "dive" category in his overview of Portland's best coffee shops for working on a laptop. College Magazine's Brooks Lockett called Southeast Grind "Portland's favorite 24/7 coffee shop" in her 2019 list of "24 things to do in Portland in 24 hours". In his 2020 overview of "Portland's Best Coffee Shops With WiFi" for Thrillist, Cottell called the coffeehouse "fabulously grungy".

In 2017, Morgan Watkins of Portland State University's Daily Vanguard said Southeast Grind offers "some bomb-ass coffee and tea to warm you up on chilly nights". The Beacon's Jenna Rossiter recommended the espresso drinks, especially the Night Rider, in her 2017 overview of "how to go out when you're not 21". The student newspaper's Hannah Sievert recommended the coffeehouse for late-night cramming and said the space has a "distinct Portland vibe with their healthy foods and locally made art". In her 2019 overview of quality locations for studying, Natalie Nygren called Southeast Grind a "super cute spot" offering "unique coffee creations". Although she noted that it was "a bit far" from the University of Portland, she was convinced that it was "worth the drive", and recommended the Charging Tiger and the quesadillas.
