= Dan Earl May =

American artist (1952–2019)

Dan Earl May, also known as D. E. May, (March 28, 1952 – February 27, 2019) was an American artist. Known in Northwest art circles for his drawings and constructions using found materials that "suggests they are documents or tools left over from the [building] and planning of something larger" whose "purpose is now lost and can only be imagined." His work is in the collections of numerous art museums, primarily in the Northwest.

== Life ==
May was born in Salem, Oregon. He lived there his entire life, referring to it as "Island Salem." In the 1970s, he studied art with Larry Stobie at the Oregon College of Education. He owned two art galleries in Salem and had solo exhibitions or was in group shows in seven states.

May was a finalist for the Portland Art Museum’s 2008 Contemporary Northwest Art Awards. He won a national Art Matters grant and was a Hallie Ford Fellow in the Visual Arts in 2013.

His workroom was in downtown Salem, known as the "Regionaires Club," and serving as a "half-secret social club". He was a regular at several Salem bars. (A book on May was entitled Dive Bar Architect.)

Profiles of May noted his quirks. His workroom was dark, the windows covered with fiberboard, the room lit by desk lamps. (He described himself as nocturnal; a reporter of one profile was instructed not to call until after 1 p.m.) His found materials - scraps of cardboard, old maps, old papers, old stamps - were stored in stacks of catalogued cardboard boxes.

May was described as "decidedly analog", not having owned a car since 1977 and getting his first phone, a landline, at the age of 47.

== Work ==
His materials included small pieces of cardboard, marked into grids, and larger pages from ledger books and graph papers that have been remade to suggest diagrams, templates and floor plans. He also made small box-like constructions, some the size of index cards, from found materials recast into geometric designs.

== Reception ==
Richard Klein, curator of the Aldrich Contemporary Art Museum, said that despite the "small scale" and "ephemeral character" of May’s works, "they offer an expansive experience."

In Artforum, writer Stephanie Snyder praised May’s work at one "electric" exhibition for its "passionate exploration of spatial forms, language and storied materials" such as "weathered cardboard."

In Oregon Artswatch, writers Anna Gray and Ryan Wilson Paulsen noted "his meticulous abstractions hold a subtle magic. They appear as both documents of the past and proposals for a future architecture..."

In its biography for May to accompany its collection of his work, the Hallie Ford Museum of Art, said, "May's refined abstractions speak to his interest in storied materials that reflect time and place as well as to an artistic process that transforms the banal and forgotten into objects of contemplation." It quotes May: "I have always been drawn to the non archival. The work I do may not be here forever, but it will probably see us out."

== Publications ==
Inland Waterways: Correspondence, produced by Marquand Editions, Tieton, WA. Funding provided by The Ford Foundation. 2017

The Template Files: Works by D.E. May, printed by Publications Studio. Layout by Kazu Ohashi. Essay by Anna Gray and Ryan Wilson Paulsen. 2010

D.E. May: The Occupations, published by The Art Gym. 2003

== Awards ==
- 2013 Ford Family Foundation, Hallie Ford Fellowship
- 2008 Contemporary Northwest Art Awards finalist, Portland Art Museum
- 1996 Juror’s Award, Willamette Valley Juried Exhibition, Mary Ann Deffenbaugh, Juror
- 1995 Juror’s Award, Oregon Biennial, William A. Fagaly, Juror
- 1992 Art Matters Grant

== Solo exhibitions ==
- 2023 From the Archives: Notes and Plans, PDX Contemporary Art, Portland, Oregon
- 2022 D. E. May Archive Project, PDX Contemporary Art, Portland, Oregon
- 2019 Dan May: Artworks by D.E. May, PDX Contemporary Art, Portland, Oregon
- 2015 No Specific Region, PDX Contemporary Art, Portland, Oregon
- 2014 Half Distance, LAXART, Los Angeles, California
- 2013 Memory of Line: Grids, Templates and Miniatures, PDX Contemporary Art, Portland, Oregon
- 2013 Volta NY, with PDX Contemporary Art, New York, New York
- 2010 The Template Files, PDX Contemporary Art, Portland, Oregon
- 2009 Black Page, PDX Contemporary Art, Portland, Oregon
- 2008 The Artist as Archivist, Hallie Ford Museum of Art, Willamette University, Salem, Oregon
- 2007 Testbeds, PDX Contemporary Art, Portland, Oregon
- 2006 Drawing(s): 40+ artists/200works- A 25th Anniversary Exhibition, ArtGym, Marylhurst University, Marylhurst, Oregon
- 2005 template – grid – inset, Pavel Zoubok Gallery, New York, New York
- 2004 Wood, PDX Contemporary Art, Portland, Oregon
- 2003 Retrospective, ArtGym, Marylhurst University, Marylhurst, Oregon
- 2003 Alloys and the Role of Water, PDX Contemporary Art, Portland, Oregon
- 2001 Reservoir District, PDX Contemporary Art, Portland, Oregon
- 2000 Solo show, Hallie Brown Ford Museum, Willamette University, Salem, OR
- 1999 Small Timber, The Templates, PDX Contemporary Art, Portland, Oregon
- 1999 Drawing Space, George Suyama Space, Seattle, Washington
- 1998 Dark Cabinet, PDX Contemporary Art, Portland, Oregon
- 1997 Small Timber, PDX Contemporary Art, Portland, Oregon
- 1994 Reservoir District, Jamison/Thomas Gallery, Portland, Oregon
- 1993 Recent Work, Jamison/Thomas Gallery, Portland, Oregon
- 1992 New Works, Jamison/Thomas Gallery, Portland, Oregon
- 1990 D.E. May, Paintings and Constructions, Jamison/Thomas Gallery, Portland, Oregon
- 1985 Floor Plans, The Yellow Front, Salem, Oregon
- 1984 The Four Berlins, The Yellow Front, Salem, Oregon
- 1984 Gstaad - Haunts of the Very Rich, The Yellow Front, Salem, Oregon
- 1982 Hide Outs, Hallie Ford Brown Gallery, Salem, Oregon
- 1979 The Lost Weekend, The Big Sleep Gallery, Salem, Oregon
- 1979 Nightlights and Paperweights, The Big Sleep Gallery, Salem, Oregon
- 1978 Willamette University, Salem, Oregon
- 1978 Expeditions, The Big Sleep Gallery, Salem, Oregon
- 1978 Handline, The Big Sleep Gallery, Salem, Oregon
- 1977 Fort Ord Logic, The Big Sleep Gallery, Salem, Oregon
- 1976 Willamette University, Salem, Oregon
