= Mary Clark (politician) =

American politician (died 1987)

Member of the Connecticut House of Representatives from Avon
- In office 1961–1963 Serving with George J. Malloy
- Preceded by: Robert B. August
- Succeeded by: George J. Malloy; Carl E. Pratt

Personal details
- Born: Mary V. Kellogg; 1906 or 1907 Broad Brook, Connecticut, U.S.
- Died: January 19, 1987 (aged 80) Florida, U.S.
- Party: Republican
- Spouse: William Clark
- Children: 2

Mary V. Clark (1906 or 1907 – January 19, 1987) was an American politician who served in the Connecticut House of Representatives from 1961 to 1963, representing the town of Avon as a Republican.

== Personal life ==
Mary V. Kellogg was born in 1906 or 1907 in Broad Brook, Connecticut. She was married to William Clark and had two children. She lived in Avon until 1970, when she moved to Florida.

== Political career ==
A Republican, Clark was elected to the Connecticut House of Representatives in 1960, and she served one term representing the town of Avon alongside George J. Malloy. The session was the first in which Avon qualified to send two members to the House of Representatives. Clark served on the Committee for Penal Institutions, the Committee on Public Health, and the Federal and Intergovernmental Relations Committee. She did not run for reelection in 1962.

== Death ==
Clark died on January 19, 1987, in Florida. She was 80.
