= The Woodsman Tavern =

Restaurant in Portland, Oregon, US

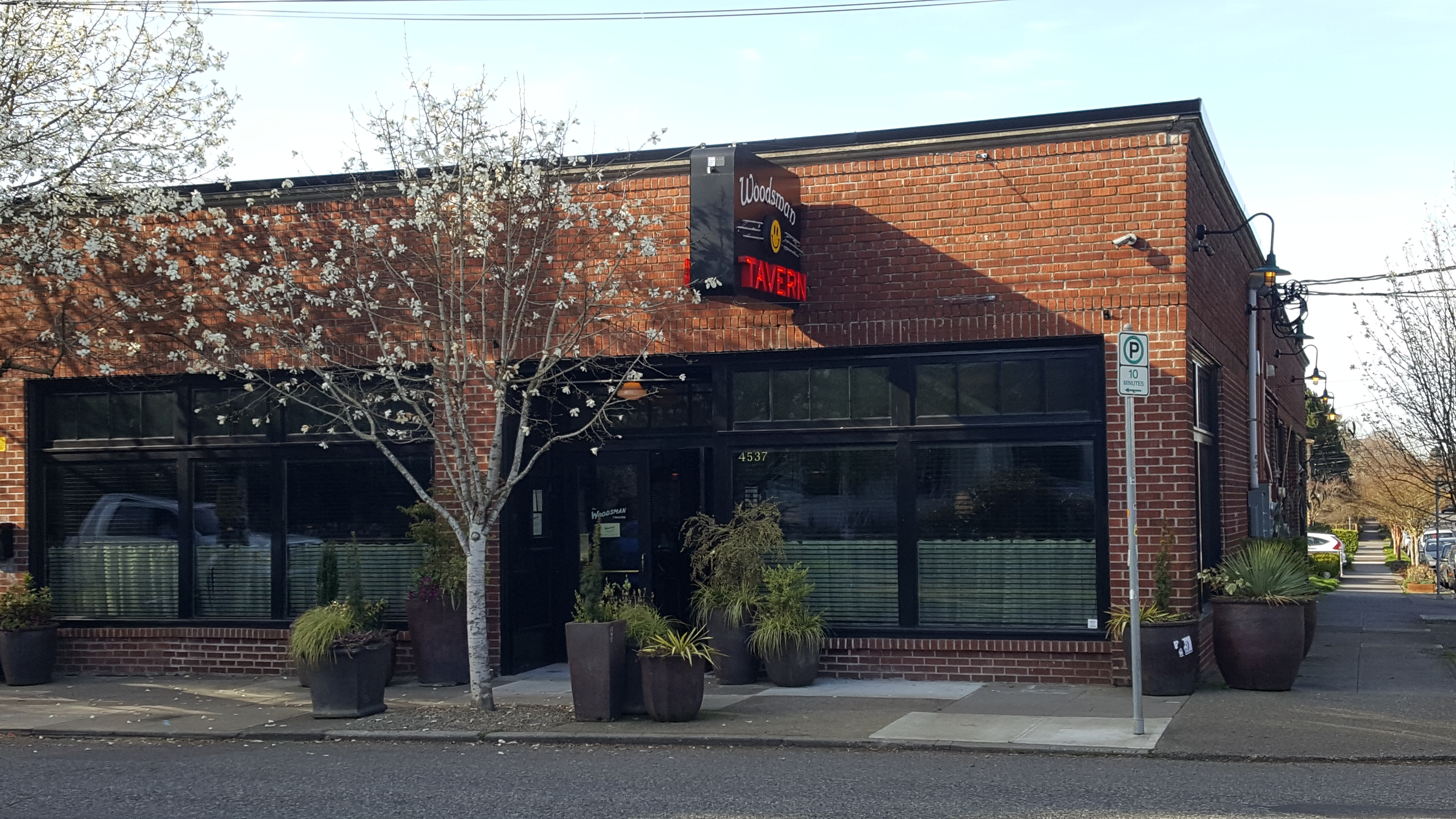
- The restaurant's exterior in March 2022
- Interactive map of The Woodsman Tavern

Restaurant information
- Established: 2011
- Food type: New American
- Location: 4537 Southeast Division Street, Portland, Multnomah, Oregon, 97206, United States
- Coordinates: 45.50551°N 122.61547°W
- Website: thewoodsmantavern.com

The Woodsman Tavern was a New American restaurant in the Richmond neighborhood of Portland, Oregon, in the United States. The restaurant originally operated from 2011 to 2018, followed by a second stint from 2021 to 2023.

== Description ==
The Woodman Tavern served New American cuisine in southeast Portland's Richmond neighborhood.

== History ==
The restaurant originally opened in 2011, and closed in December 2018. The building later housed Tasty n Daughters. The restaurant group Submarine Hospitality re-opened The Woodsman Tavern on December 1, 2021. In 2023, the business announced plans to close on August 20. A closing announcement said, "We love our neighborhood and this very beloved piece of SE Division Street. With that, we won't be gone for long and are developing a new concept to share with you soon enough."

The restaurant L'Échelle began operating in the space in 2024.

== Reception ==
Michael Russell included the restaurant in The Oregonian's 2023 list of Portland's ten best new brunches.

== See also ==
- List of defunct restaurants of the United States
- List of New American restaurants
