= George Herman (playwright) =

American playwright and writer (1928–2019)

- Born: George Adam Herman, Jr. April 12, 1928; Norfolk, Virginia, U.S.
- Died: June 22, 2019 (aged 91); Portland, Oregon, U.S.
- Education: Loyola College; Catholic University of America
- Occupations: Playwright, writer, academic
- Writing career
- Period: 1960s–2019
- Notable awards: McKnight Foundation Humanities Award (1963)

George Adam Herman Jr. (April 12, 1928 – June 22, 2019) was an American playwright and writer.

== Biography ==
=== Early years and Education ===
George Adam Herman Jr. was born in Norfolk, Virginia on April 12, 1928. He attended a parochial school and High School in Maryland, and then earned a bachelor's degree in Philosophy from Loyola College. From 1947 to 1949, Herman also spent three summers at the Boston College School of Expressional Art on a playwrighting scholarship. In 1954, he earned a Master of Fine Arts from Catholic University of America.

=== Career ===
Herman taught playwrighting and was artist-in-residence at numerous American universities. For 16 years he lived and worked in Hawaii on the staff of the State Superintendent of Education. He directed over 200 plays for numerous schools and theaters, served as the Artistic Director for at least one theatre (the Commedia Repertory Theatre in Hawaii), and designed sets and lighting for more than 40 productions.

While in Hawaii, Herman also worked for as a theater columnist and drama critic. He turned to writing novels at age 65, and published seven novels and one children's book.

As a playwright, Herman won numerous awards from 1953. His best known play is "A Company of Wayward Saints", which has been in print continuously since it was first published in 1963. His plays for radio, television, and the stage have been produced around the world. He had five published plays, and a number of his award-winning unpublished plays are also available through his website. Herman received more than 30 awards for his writing.

=== Personal life and death ===
George Herman was married three times and had nine children. He latterly resided in Portland, Oregon, where he died on June 22, 2019, at the age of 91.

== Awards ==
- 1953 Hartke Playwrighting Award - "The Pygmalion Effect"
- 1963 McKnight Foundation Humanities Award - "A Company of Wayward Saints"
- 1974 Julie Harris-Beverly Hills Theatre Award - "The Man in the Cordoban Hat"
- 1976 Ayling Foundation Awards for new plays for children - "Nine Dragons"
- 1980 Ayling Foundation Awards for new plays for children - "The Hidden Place"
- 1985 Roberts Theatre Institute Award - "The King Has Gone to Tenebrae"
- 1993 Julie Harris-Beverly Hills Theatre Award - "Pious Nine is Falling Down"

== Work ==
=== Published Plays ===
- A Company of Wayward Saints (1963)
- A Smell of Cinnamon
- Devil of the Second Stairs
- Nine Dragons (1977)
- The Hidden Place (1978)
- Little Rome - Iowa (2003) ISBN 0-595-27236-3, ISBN 978-0-595-27236-5

=== Books ===
- Carnival of Saints (1994) ISBN 0-345-38150-5, ISBN 978-0-345-38150-7
- A Comedy of Murders (The first adventure of Leonardo da Vinci and Niccolo de Pavia) (1994) ISBN 0-7867-0064-5, ISBN 978-0-7867-0064-6
- The Tears of the Madonna (Second Adventure of Leonardo da Vinci and Niccolo de Pavia) (1996) ISBN 0-7867-0243-5, ISBN 978-0-7867-0243-5
- The Florentine Mourners (Third Adventure of Leonardo da Vinci and Niccolo de Pavia) (1999) ISBN 1-58348-627-5, ISBN 978-1-58348-627-6
- The Toys of War (Fourth Adventure of Leonardo da Vinci and Niccolo de Pavia) (2001) ISBN 0-595-20951-3, # ISBN 978-0-595-20951-4
- Necromancer: The fifth adventure of Leonardo da Vinci and Niccolo da Pavia (2003) ISBN 978-0-595-28265-4
- The Arno Serpent: The sixth adventure of Leonardo da Vinci and Niccolo da Pavia (2007) ISBN 0-595-44241-2, # ISBN 978-0-595-44241-6
- Nine Dragons (2003) ISBN 0-8048-3481-4, ISBN 978-0-8048-3481-0
- Cardinal Virtues (Seventh Adventure of Leonardo da Vinci and Niccolo da Pavia) (2012)
