= The Hillsboro Argus =

American newspaper in Hillsboro, Oregon

- Type: Twice-weekly newspaper
- Format: Broadsheet
- Owner: Advance Publications
- Editor: Tom Maurer
- Founded: 1873
- Ceased publication: 2017
- City: Hillsboro, Oregon, U.S.
- Circulation: 43,000 Wednesday, 6,000 Friday; Paid subscribers: 6,539 (as of 2012)
- Price: $0.75
- ISSN: 8750-5479
- Website: oregonlive.com/argus

The Hillsboro Argus was a twice-weekly newspaper in the city of Hillsboro, Oregon, from 1894 to 2017, known as the Washington County Argus for its final year. The Argus was distributed in Washington County, Oregon, United States. First published in 1894, but later merged with the older, 1873-introduced Forest Grove Independent, the paper was owned by the McKinney family for more than 90 years prior to being sold to Advance Publications in 1999. The Argus was published weekly until 1953, then twice-weekly from 1953 until 2015. In early 2017, it was reported that the paper was planning to cease publication in March 2017. The final edition was that of March 29, 2017.

== History ==
The Argus newspaper traced its history back to 1873. In 1873, the Forest Grove Independent newspaper was founded as the first newspaper in Washington County, Oregon. By December the paper had moved to Hillsboro and named itself the Washington Independent. Albert E. Tozier owned the paper with a partner from 1885 to 1887. Daniel Gault owned the Independent from 1892 to 1902.

In March 1894, R. H. Mitchell and C. W. Clow founded a new paper in Hillsboro, the Argus. On March 28, 1894, the first Hillsboro Argus was printed which included a front page advertisement for Hillsboro lawyer and later Congressman Thomas H. Tongue. Other news of the day concerned a battle over the county seat of Lincoln County, Oregon. At that time it was a weekly paper of only six pages and was located on Second Street between Main and Washington streets.

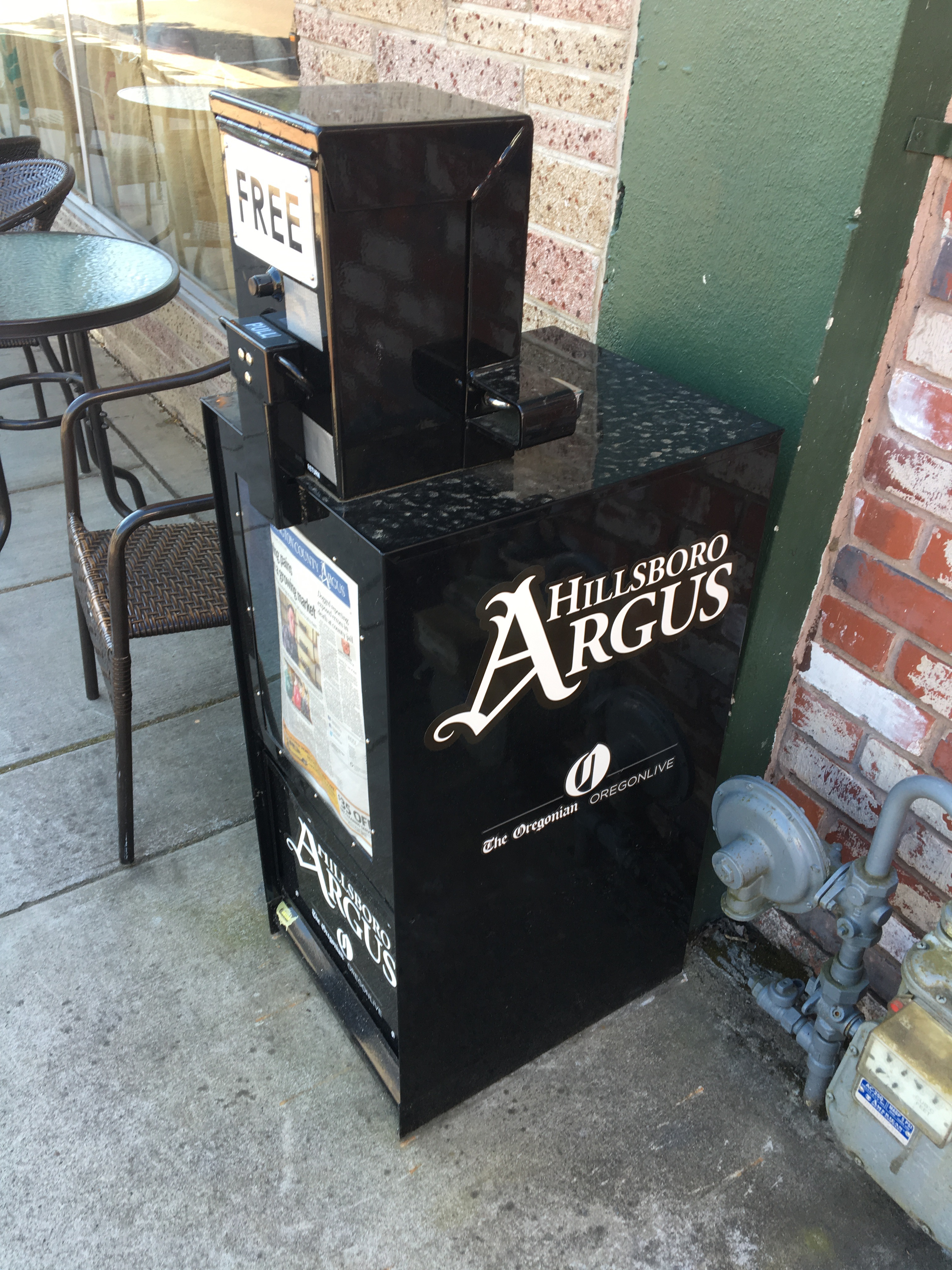
Argus distribution box in Forest Grove, Oregon

In the early years of the Argus, ownership changed hands often, with Mrs. Emma C. McKinney acquiring a half interest in the newspaper in 1904. McKinney’s son W. Verne McKinney would join the paper in 1923. In November of that year, the size of the paper began to grow beyond the six pages that had included two pages of wire-report news known as boilerplate. Next, in January 1932, the Argus purchased the Independent from S.C. Killen and merged the two papers. The Argus won accolades from the National Editorial Association in 1934, 1935, 1937, 1938, and 1939 for various topics ranging from production to general excellence to editorials. In 1940, it was selected as the best weekly newspaper in the United States for its size by the National Editorial Association.

The Argus remained as a weekly publication until November 1, 1953, when it became a twice-weekly newspaper. From 1917 to 1955 the paper was located on Main Street in Hillsboro between Second and Third streets. In 1955, it moved to a building it bought on Third Street between Main and Washington. The Oregon Newspaper Publishers Association awarded the paper the award for best sports coverage in 1988. In 1989, it was selected as the best non-daily newspaper in the United States for papers with a circulation in excess of 10,000 by the National Newspaper Association.

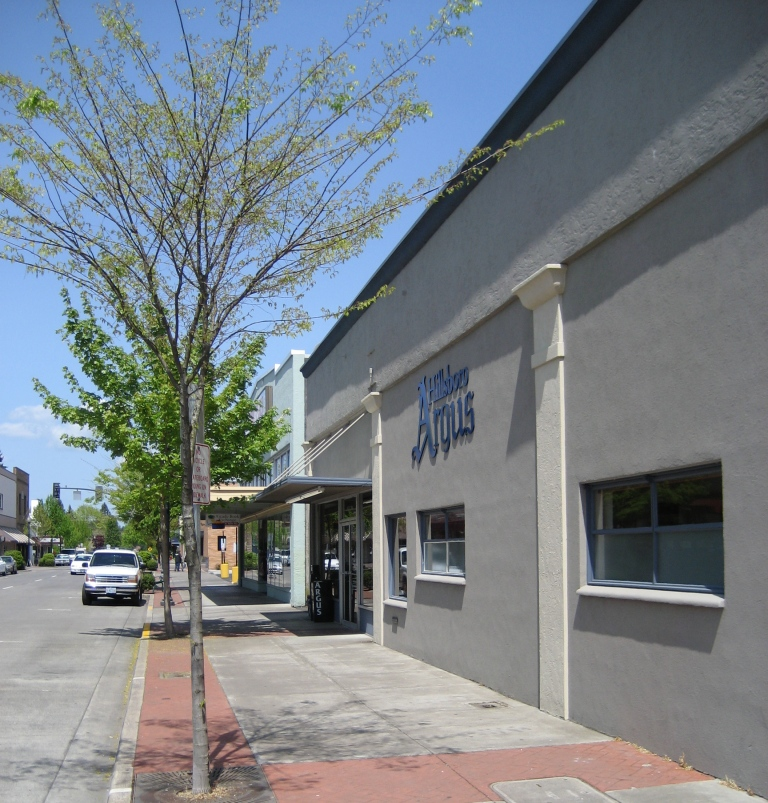
The Argus' former offices, in use from 1955 to 2014

In October 1999, the Argus was sold by the McKinney family to Advance Publications, Inc. after the family had held ownership interests in the paper since 1904 and had been sole owners since 1909. Advance also owns the region's daily newspaper, The Oregonian. Until 2012, the two papers' operations were completely separate, and the papers competed for stories and advertising revenue, but in January 2012 The Oregonian took over the management of the Argus.

As of 2003 the paper had a total weekly circulation of 15,000 copies. In 2007, the paper won first place from the Oregon Newspaper Publishers Association for best use of a small space for an advertisement and second place for best black-and-white ad.

The newspaper's staff also compiled the Hillsboro Argus Courier-Mail. This newspaper was mailed for free to 41,000 homes across Washington County on Tuesdays and contained partial articles from the prior week's editions of the paid edition of the Argus.

In 2012, the paper's parent company integrated the Argus operations into The Oregonian's operations, which in 2014 was followed by the sale of the Argus' longtime home on Third Avenue in downtown Hillsboro. The paper's staff moved out of the building in August 2014. At the time of the move, the paper was published on Wednesdays and Fridays.

At the end of August 2015, the Friday edition was discontinued, with publication continuing only weekly, on Wednesdays. In December 2015 it was announced the paper would be combined with the Beaverton Leader and the Forest Grove Leader to form the Washington County Argus. The last edition published under the Hillsboro Argus name was that of January 6, 2016.

In early 2017, the Hillsboro Tribune reported that the Washington County Argus was due to cease publication in March, with the final issue expected to be that of March 29, 2017. The paper was discontinued as expected, on March 29, 2017, with the final edition being Volume 123, No. 52.

== Editors ==
Cover of the August 28, 2000 edition

L.A. Long, father of judge Donald E. Long, was editor of the newspaper from 1894 to 1907 and again from 1909 to 1923. Long-time editors Emma McKinney and W. Verne McKinney were both inducted into the Oregon Newspaper Hall of Fame in 1981. In 2002, Walter McKinney was also inducted to the hall of fame. The National Newspaper Association presents an annual award, the Emma C. McKinney Memorial Award, honoring her 58 years of work in the newspaper business and her place as dean of Oregon newspaper people.

Former Chicago-area sports columnist Gary Stutzman was the Managing Editor from 2002 to January 2012.

In January 2012, Tom Maurer was named Editor. Maurer was also Washington County Editor of The Oregonian.

== Coverage ==
The Hillsboro Argus covered Hillsboro and some surrounding areas, including North Plains, Cornelius, and Aloha. The paper's staff covered sports, politics, business, and local events.
