= Jim Beatty (musician) =

American jazz musician (1934–2019)

- Born: James William Beatty; June 9, 1934; Jamestown, New York, U.S.
- Died: March 12, 2019 (aged 84) Portland, Oregon, U.S.
- Genres: Jazz
- Occupation: Musician
- Instruments: Clarinet, saxophone
- Years active: 1950s–2010s
- Website: jimbeattyjazz.com

James William Beatty (June 9, 1934 – March 12, 2019) was an American jazz musician who specialized in the clarinet and soprano saxophone. He played on both American coasts and toured the world in countries such as China, Russia, and the United Kingdom. He appeared on over 50 recordings, 15 of his own, and was a guest of honor at 80th birthday of King Simeon of Bulgaria in 2017.

== Biography ==
Beatty was born to a Swedish mother and English father. He was given a clarinet for his eighth birthday and fell in love with New Orleans Jazz. Growing up in Jamestown allowed Beatty to travel to New York City and other nearby locations to listen to jazz musicians. As a teenager, he would find entrance into bars and clubs and listen to and introduce himself to musicians such as Omer Simeon, "Wild" Bill Davison, Henry "Red" Allen, George Lewis, Sidney Bechet, and Louis Armstrong. Bechet was Beatty's idol growing up, and Omer Simeon became a close friend and mentor.

Beatty started playing in bands and traveling to hear jazz in places such as New Orleans and Los Angeles. With the onset of the Korean War, he was drafted into the U.S. Army. Due to his playing experience, Beatty was invited to try-out and attend the Army Band School. After doing well in the try-out and finishing basic training, Beatty was sent to the Army School of Music. After training at Fort Dix in Trenton, New Jersey, he was assigned to the 184th Army Band stationed in Fort Eustis, Virginia. Beatty and the 184th played for Queen Elizabeth and Prince Philip of England during their tour of Jamestown and Williamsburg where he was a featured soloist.

After being discharged in 1958, Beatty headed back to Jamestown where he started playing gigs in Jamestown and western New York. He was hired in 1961 to perform with a band in Nassau, Bahamas for the winter season. While there he became friends with Bulgaria's King in exile, King Simeon, while also meeting his future wife, Pauline. After the Bahamas, Beatty travelled throughout the U.S. and Canada playing a variety of jobs. In 1964, he moved back to Jamestown and formed his own band, The Dixielads. The band became popular in western New York and consistently played in cities such as Buffalo, Syracuse, and Rochester. During this time Beatty became close friends with trumpet legend "Wild" Bill Davison, who would occasionally join The Dixielads in their performances.

The late 1960s saw Beatty move his family to Portland, Oregon. He played with Monte Ballous's Castle Jazz Band before forming The Jim Beatty Jazz Band. During the 1970s, he played for nightclubs, parties, and jazz clubs in Portland and throughout the west coast. He also played in concerts with the Turk Murphy Jazz Band, continued to play gigs with "Wild" Bill Davison, trumpet legends Jim Goodwin and Ernie Carson, and was hired by the U.S. Government to present "jazz lectures and concerts" to local schools in Oregon and Washington. Beatty's night life on the west coast intersected with many celebrities of the time, playing for and spending time with the likes of André the Giant, Forrest Tucker, and Sam Elliott. During Robert Kennedy's Presidential Campaigning for the Oregon Primary in 1968, Beatty became friends with Kennedy after playing for his campaign party.

As jazz night club life declined in the 1980s, Beatty spent the rest of his career traveling the west coast and world to play gigs and producing albums with his band. Beatty became a fixture in England and Wales in the 1990s, becoming a yearly guest of the Bude Jazz Festival and other locations in the United Kingdom. He also played and toured in China and had stints throughout Europe. In 2009, Beatty was invited by the U.S. State Department to teach at a jazz academy in Yekaterinburg, Russia. At the academy, Beatty taught, played for, and judged young Russian jazz musicians. The stint also saw Beatty perform in the Urals Estrady Theater in front of a packed Russian house. Russian jazz critic, Victor Bainov, wrote of the concert, "(Jim Beatty) is a serious musician who plays only his favorite music. He is not excessively showy. However, to the attentive listener, he is very expressive in his movements and poses. Jim is one of the Last Mohicans of jazz. The difference between Beatty and the last of Fenimore Cooper's warrior Mohicans is that the type of jazz musician he exemplifies will never grow old."

Beatty continued to play locally in Portland and travel, most notably in Palm Springs, California. He was a guest of honor at King Simeon's 80th birthday party in Bulgaria in 2017. In March 2019 he died from complications due to a stroke.

== Discography ==
- Clarinet and Rhythm
- Live at Harvey's (Vector, 1981)
- Just a Little (GHB, 1988)
- Christmas Clarinet (JB, 1997)
- Plays Just Jazz with Wild Bill Davidson and Jim Goodwin (JB)
- Strictly Dixie and Blues
- Song of Songs
- That's a Plenty
- At the Portland Art Museum
- Unforgettable
- The Premier Ball
- Holly Jolly Jazz
- We'll Meet Again
- Memories
- Old Time Religion
- The West Coast Years: 1968–1993 25th Anniversary
