= Han Oak =

Korean restaurant in Portland, Oregon, U.S.

- Interactive map of Han Oak

Restaurant information
- Food type: Korean
- Location: Portland, Oregon, United States
- Coordinates: 45°31′36.5″N 122°38′30.6″W
- Website: hanoakpdx.com

Han Oak is a restaurant serving Korean cuisine in Portland, Oregon's Kerns neighborhood, in the United States. Owned by chef Peter Cho and partner Sun Young Park, Han Oak was The Oregonian's Restaurant of the Year in 2017.

== Menu ==
The menu has included noodles, soondae (blood sausage), Korean fried chicken wings, spicy rice cake ramen, and dumplings.

== History ==
Cho and Park opened Han Oak in 2016, in the Ocean building on Northeast Glisan.

The restaurant was featured in the season two premiere of David Chang's Netflix show Ugly Delicious in 2020, as well as a season 5 episode of the network's Somebody Feed Phil in 2022. Food critic Karen Brooks visited the restaurant for an episode of Hulu's Eater's Guide to the World.

In 2022, Han Oak re-opened after a nearly two-year closure, with a "reinvented" menu.

Han Oak and Shake Shack partnered to host a pop-up in 2023, ahead of the chain's first restaurant in Portland. In 2026, Han Oak was among local restaurants, community organizations, and other businesses that joined the "We Are Rip City" campaign in support of the Moda Center renovation project.

== Reception ==
In 2017, Han Oak was named Restaurant of the Year by The Oregonian and Portland Monthly. Michael Russell ranked the business number 7 in the newspaper's 2025 list of Portland's 40 best restaurants.

The business was included in Esquire magazine's 2021 list of 100 restaurant "America can't afford to lose". In 2023, Cho was one of 18 Portland industry professionals deemed "rising stars" by the restaurant resource and trade publication StarChefs. The business was included in Time Out Portland's 2025 list of the city's eighteen best restaurants. Hannah Wallace included the business in Condé Nast Traveler's 2025 list of Portland's 23 best restaurants. The business was included in Portland Monthly's 2025 list of 25 restaurants "that made Portland".

== See also ==
- History of Korean Americans in Portland, Oregon
- List of Korean restaurants
