= Tasty n Alder =

Defunct restaurant in Portland, Oregon, US

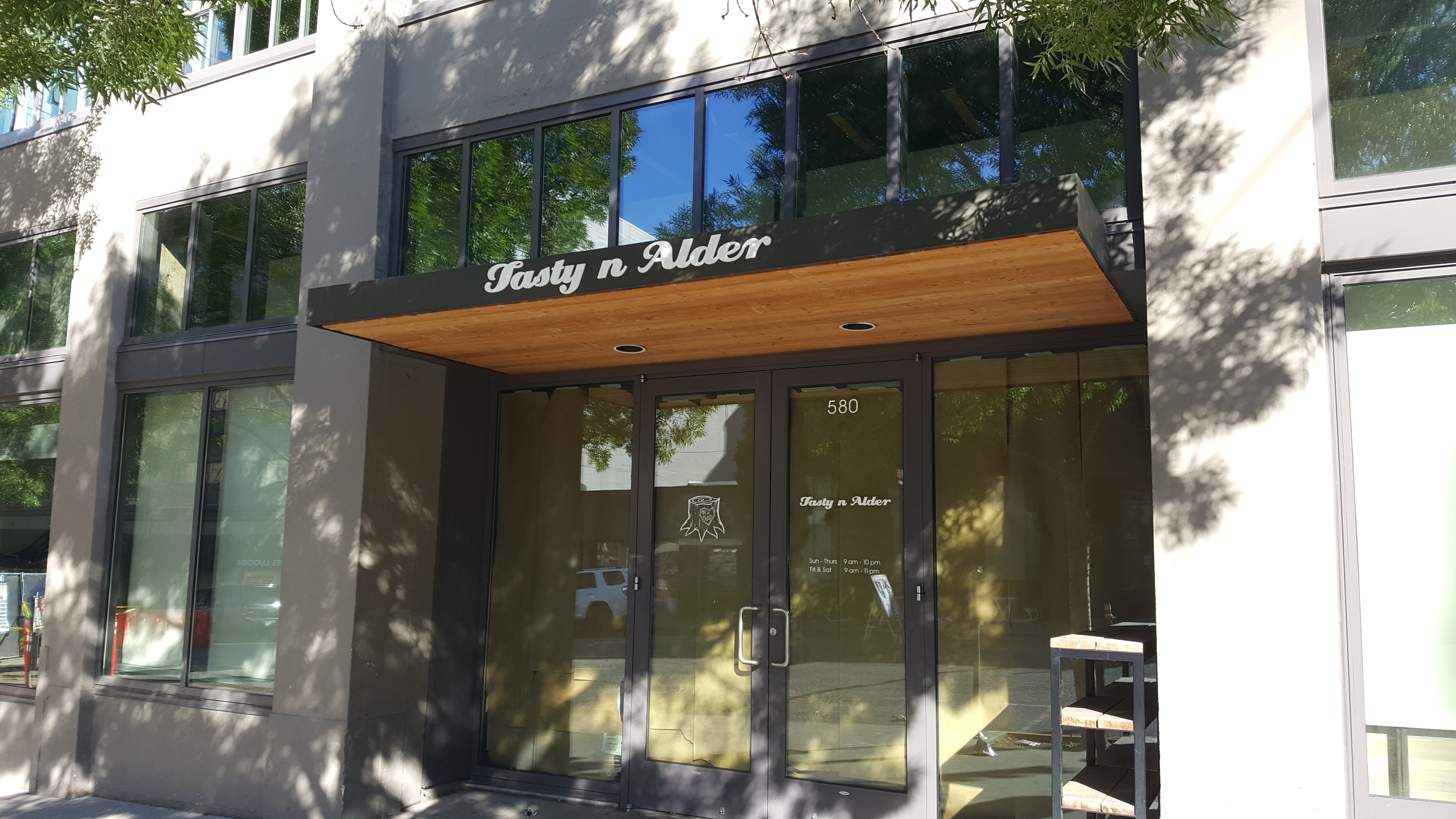
- The restaurant's exterior, 2020
- Interactive map of Tasty n Alder

Restaurant information
- Established: 2013
- Closed: 2020
- Location: 580 SW 12th Avenue, Portland, Oregon, 97205, United States
- Coordinates: 45.5213°N 122.6835°W
- Website: tastynalder.com

Tasty n Alder was a restaurant in Portland, Oregon, United States. The business opened in 2013 and closed in 2020, during the COVID-19 pandemic.

== History ==
The steakhouse opened in 2013.

Tasty n Alder closed in 2020, during the COVID-19 pandemic, replaced by the Korean restaurant Toki.

== Reception ==
In 2013, The Oregonian's David Sarasohn gave the restaurant an 'A−' rating.

== See also ==
- Impact of the COVID-19 pandemic on the restaurant industry in the United States
