= Mary E. Clark =

American biologist and professor (1927–2019)

- Born: Mary Eleanor Lawrence; April 28, 1927; San Francisco, California, U.S.
- Died: December 11, 2019 (aged 92); Veneta, Oregon
- Education: University of California, Berkeley
- Scientific career
- Fields: Biology
- Workplaces: San Diego State University

Mary Eleanor Clark (April 28, 1927, San Francisco – December 11, 2019, Veneta, Oregon) was an American biologist. She was named the first National Professor of the Year by the Council for Advancement and Support of Education. In 1978, she was named a Fellow of the American Association for the Advancement of Science.

== Life ==
She was raised in San Francisco by her father, Raymond F. Clark and mother, Norton J. Clark. At the University California, Berkeley, Clark earned her Bachelor in Biochemistry, 1949; Master of Arts in Biology, 1951; and Doctor of Philosophy, 1960. She went on to become a biology professor at San Diego State University, George Mason University, Denison University and the University of Montevallo. She was named National Professor of Year by the Council Advancement and Support Education, 1981.

In addition, she was an accomplished artist and musician and was known for her love of the outdoors.

== Selected works ==
- Contemporary Biology
- Ariadne’s Thread
- In Search of Human Nature
- Clark, Mary E. (2006-08-18). "Photosynthesis in Balance with Respiration?". Science. 313 (5789): 917–918. doi:10.1126/science.313.5789.917. ISSN 0036-8075.
- Yancey, Paul H.; Clark, Mary E.; Hand, Steven C.; Bowlus, R. David; Somero, George N. (1982-09-24). "Living with Water Stress: Evolution of Osmolyte Systems". Science. 217 (4566). American Association for the Advancement of Science (AAAS): 1214–1222. doi:10.1126/science.7112124. ISSN 0036-8075.
