= 2020 in Oregon =

- Decades: 2000s; 2010s; 2020s
- See also: History of Oregon; Historical outline of Oregon; List of years in Oregon; 2020 in the United States

The year 2020 in Oregon involved several major events.

== Politics and government ==
=== Incumbents ===
- Governor: Kate Brown (D)
- Secretary of State: Bev Clarno (R)

=== Elections ===
- 2020 United States presidential election in Oregon
- 2020 Oregon House of Representatives election

== Events ==
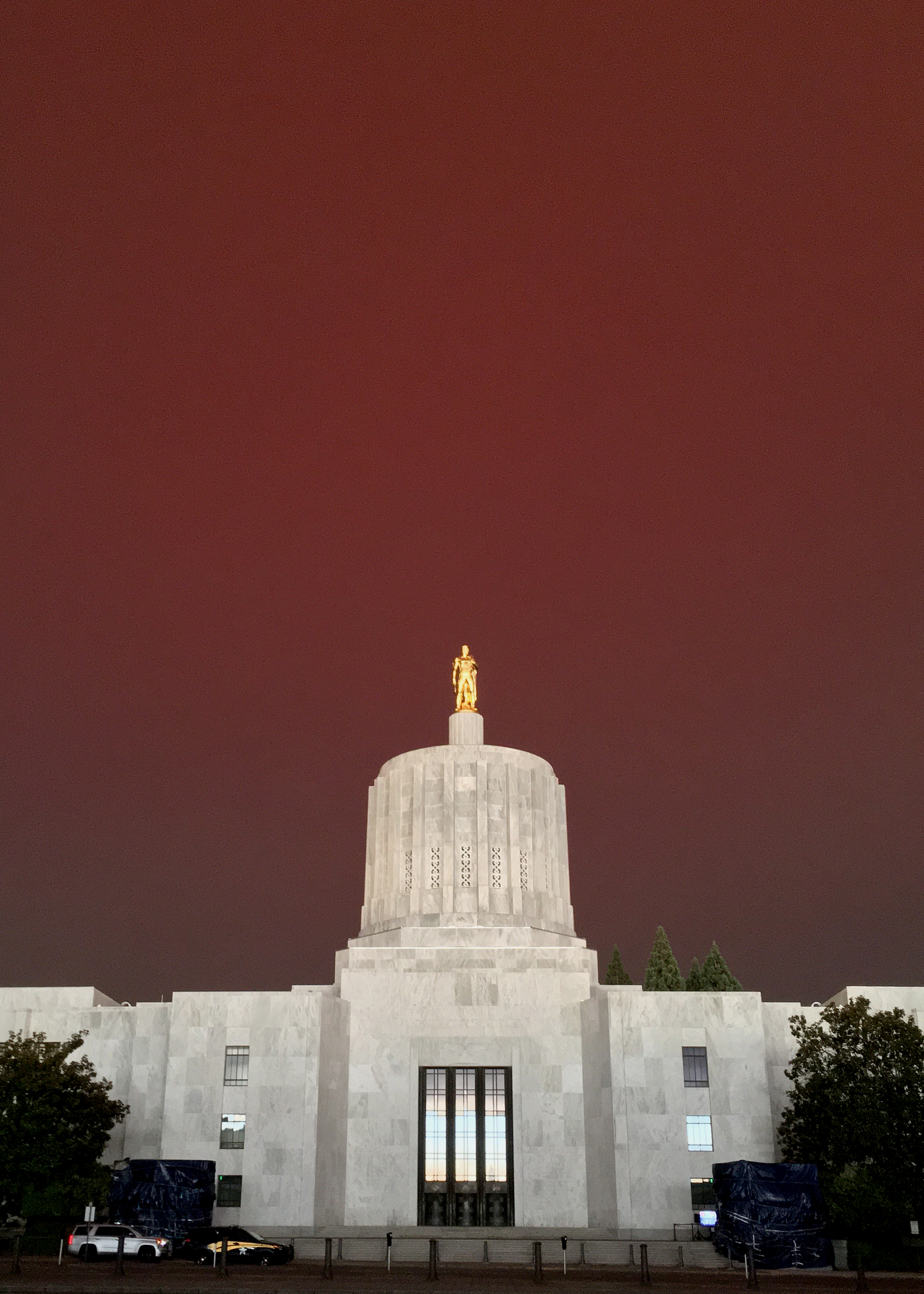
The smoke from the 2020 wildfires turned the sky red or orange in much of the state. (Oregon State Capitol, September 2020)

=== Ongoing ===
- 2020 Oregon wildfires
- COVID-19 pandemic in Oregon
- George Floyd protests in Oregon

=== February ===
- February 25 – Several Republican members of the Oregon State Senate walk out to break quorum during a vote on an environmental bill.
- February 28 – COVID-19 pandemic: The state confirms its first case of COVID-19.
- February 29– Bricks Cascade 2020, a Lego fan convention, is held in Portland.

=== March ===
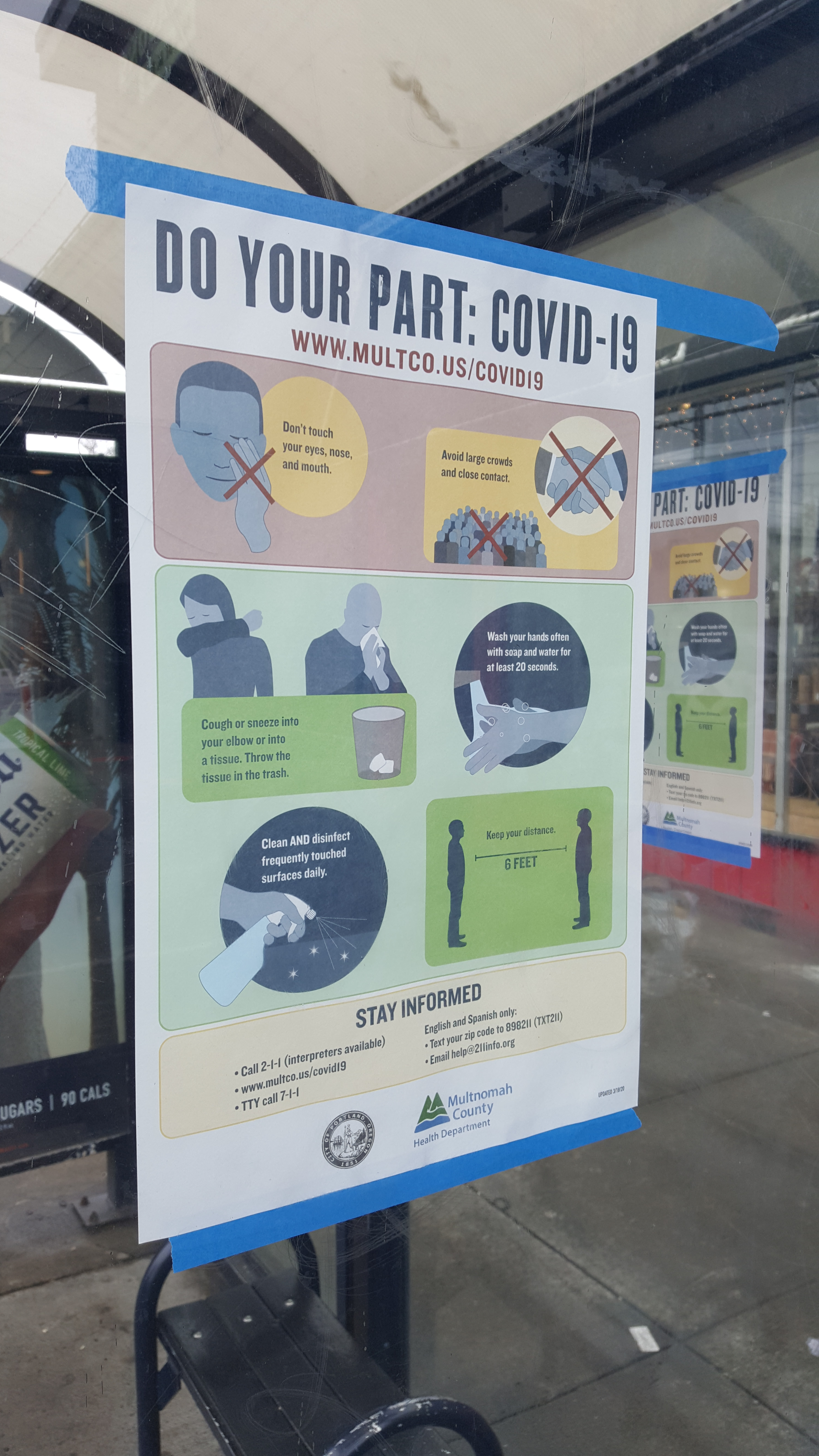
COVID-19 infographic at a TriMet bus stop in Portland, March 2020

- March 8 – COVID-19 pandemic: Governor Kate Brown declares a state of emergency.
- March 11
  - COVID-19 pandemic: The University of Oregon and Portland State University announce that all classes will be online-only for the rest of the semester.
  - COVID-19 pandemic: The Oregon Health Authority announces the first confirmed case of COVID-19 in Deschutes County, and the first local case in Umatilla County.
- March 14 – COVID-19 pandemic: A man dies from COVID-19 at the Veterans Affairs Medical Center in Portland, becoming the first person in the state known to have died from the virus.
- March 23 – COVID-19 pandemic: Governor Kate Brown issues a stay-at-home order.
- March 30 – Vortex 2020 is postponed due to COVID-19.

=== April ===
- April 13 – COVID-19 pandemic: Oregon joins Washington and California in creating the Western States Pact, an agreement to ease back each state's COVID-19 restrictions.
- April 29
  - COVID-19 pandemic: The state reports its 100th death from COVID-19.
  - A man is struck and killed by an Amtrak train in Salem.

=== May ===
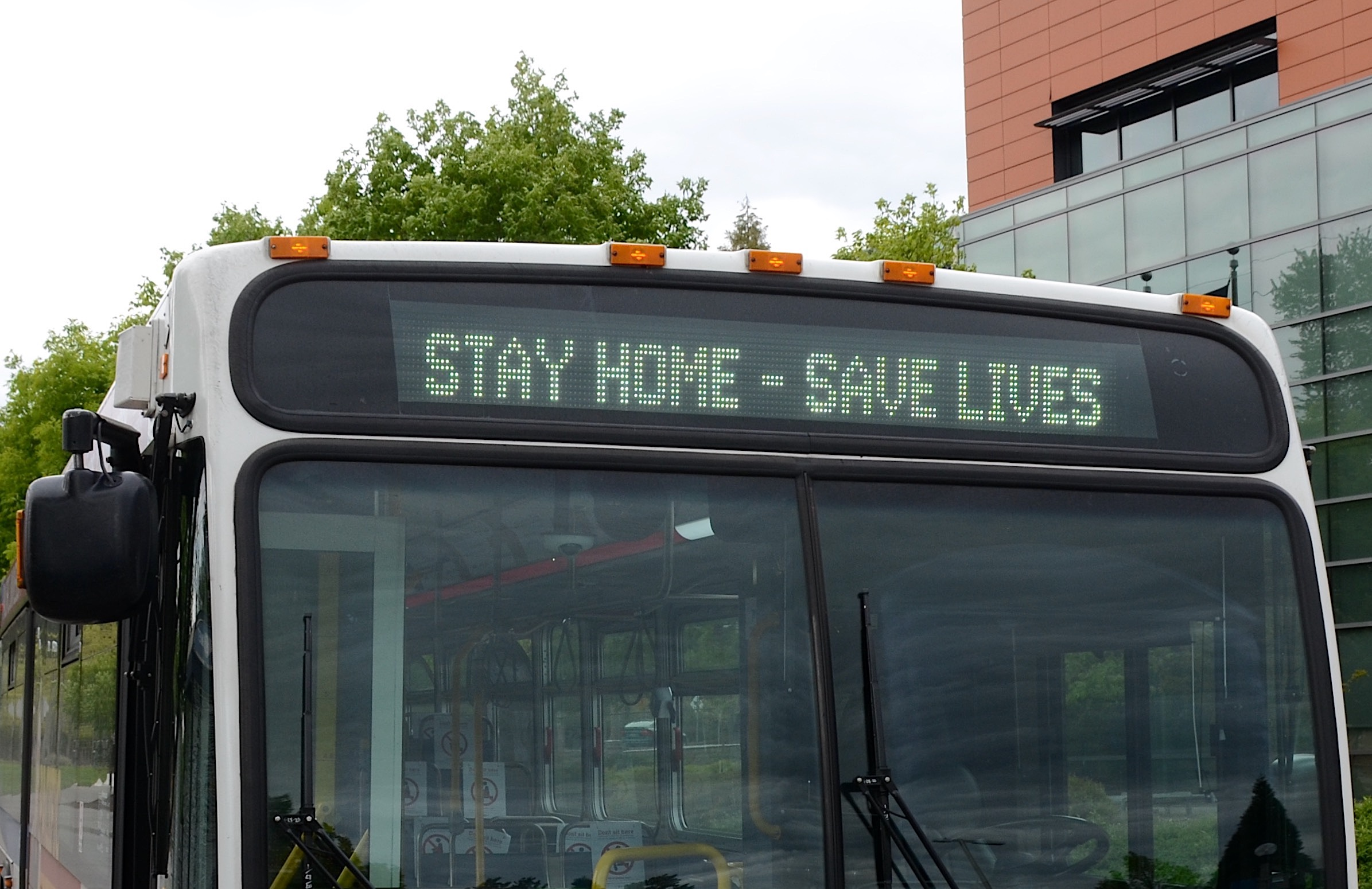
TriMet bus, Portland, May 2020

- May 5 – COVID-19 pandemic: Cycle Oregon cancels all events for the year.
- May 7 – COVID-19 pandemic: Governor Kate Brown announces a ban on large gatherings, expected to last until at least September. The Oregon State Fair is canceled almost immediately.
- May 13 – Organizers announce that the 2020 Hood to Coast is cancelled due to COVID-19 restrictions.
- May 19 – Oregon marks the end of primary voting for the Democratic and Republican parties.
- May 20 – A kitten with two faces is born at a farm in Albany.
- May 28 – Protesters gather at the Multnomah County Justice Center, marking the first George Floyd protest in Oregon.

=== June ===
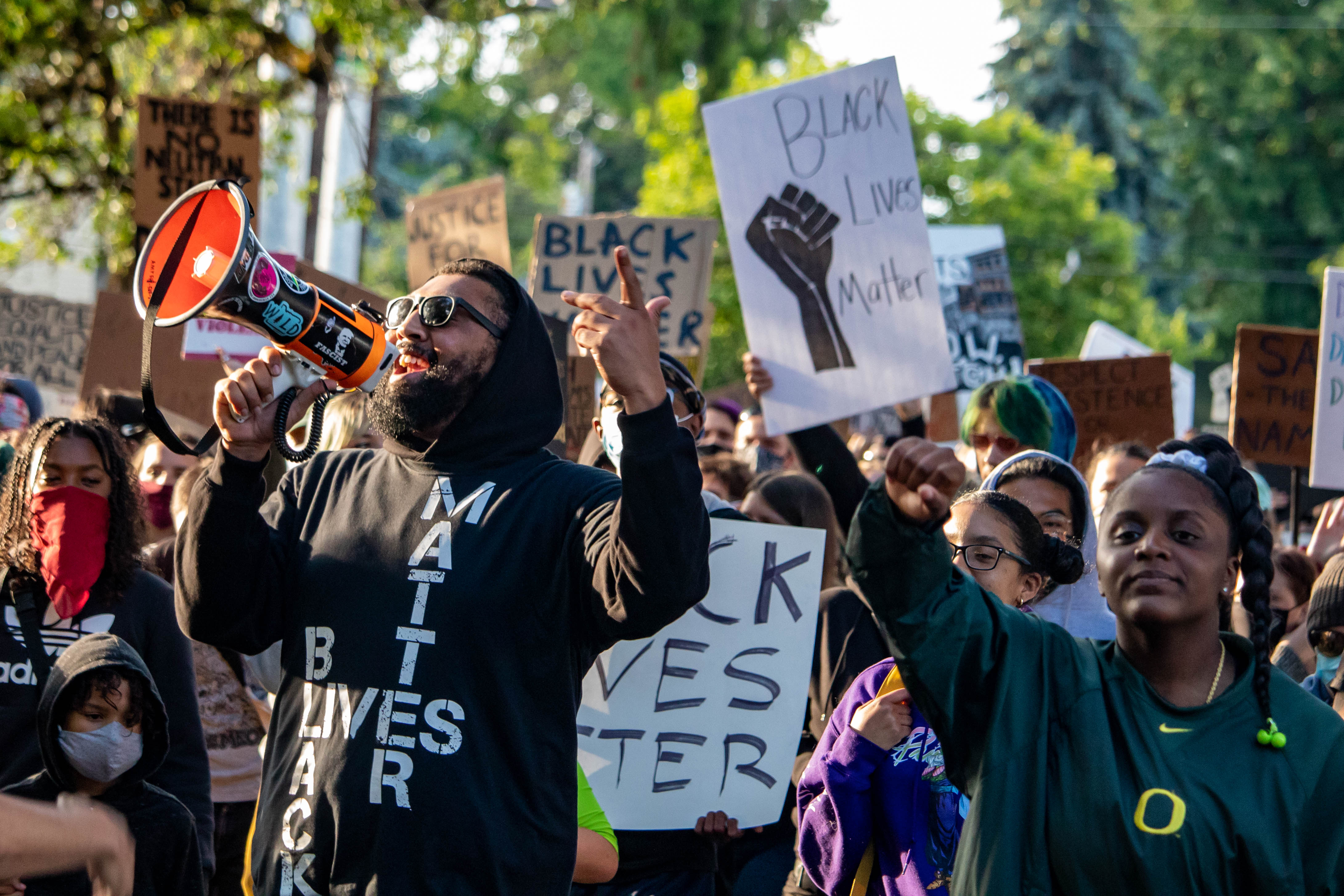
Black Lives Matter protest in Eugene, June 2020

- June 1
  - George Floyd protests: Thousands of people march across Portland's Burnside Bridge.
  - George Floyd protests: Portland mayor Ted Wheeler announces a curfew.
- June 2 – George Floyd protests: On the 6th consecutive day of protests in Portland, additional demonstrations are held in various other cities in Oregon, including Albany, Bend, Brookings, Eugene, Forest Grove, Grant's Pass, McMinnville, and Tualatin.
- June 5 – George Floyd protests: U.S. District Judge Marco A. Hernandez issues a temporary restraining order that restricts the Portland Police Bureau's use of tear gas so that it should only be used during riots, although the order defines a "riot" as involving as few as five people.
- June 8
  - George Floyd protests: Protesters shut down I-84 in Portland.
  - Amid daily protests in Portland, Portland Police Chief Jami Resch steps down, and is succeeded by Chuck Lovell.
- June 13 – A tornado touches down in Damascus, Oregon.
- June 14 – George Floyd protests: Protesters topple a statue of Thomas Jefferson at Jefferson High School in Portland.
- June 18
  - George Floyd protests: On the eve of Juneteenth, protesters topple a statue of George Washington in Northeast Portland.
  - Local resident Nick Lloyd paints the Black Lives Matter street mural on North Edison Street in Portland.
- June 26 – George Floyd protests: Protesters and the city agree to expand the restraining order on tear gas so that it also applies to rubber bullets and pepper spray.

=== July ===
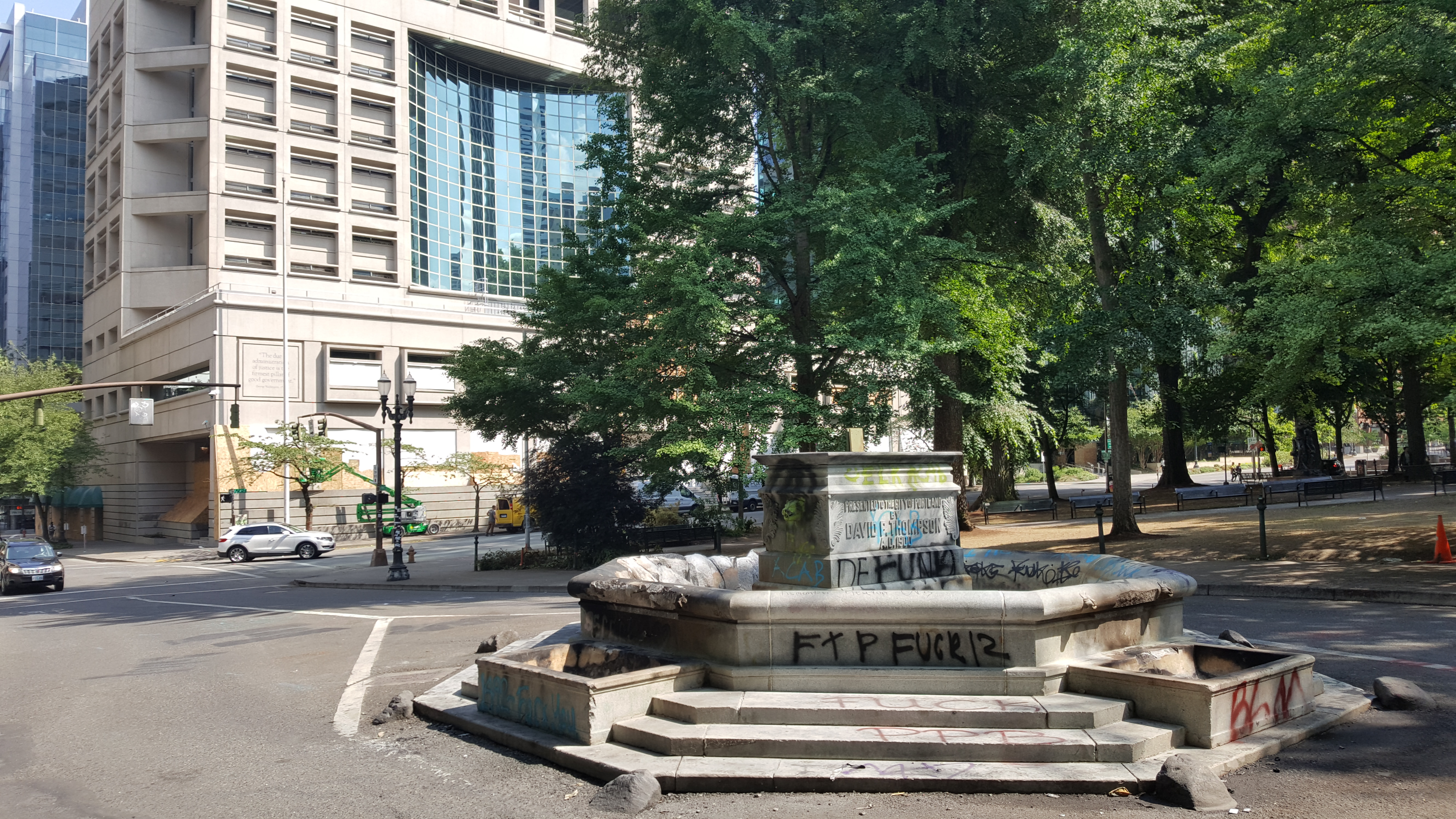
The elk fountain in Portland on July 2, 2020, after removal of the statue

- July 11 – George Floyd protests: Federal agents shoot a protester in the head with a projectile, causing skull fractures and facial injuries requiring facial reconstruction surgery.
- July 18–19 – Portland's Black Lives Matter street mural is vandalized.
- July 26 – Unidentified law enforcement hits journalist Trip Jennings directly in the eye with a pepper ball.
- July 26–27 – A heat wave brings temperatures above 100 degrees in Portland.

=== August ===
- August 20
  - Some Wasco County residents are ordered to evacuate because of the White River Fire.
  - The Northern Oregon Regional Correctional Facility (NORCF) announces that they will end their contract with ICE, leaving the state without any facilities to hold people detained by federal immigration officials.
- August 25 – A patient scales the wall of the Oregon State Hospital and briefly escapes, running for half of a mile before hospital staff catch up with her.

=== September ===
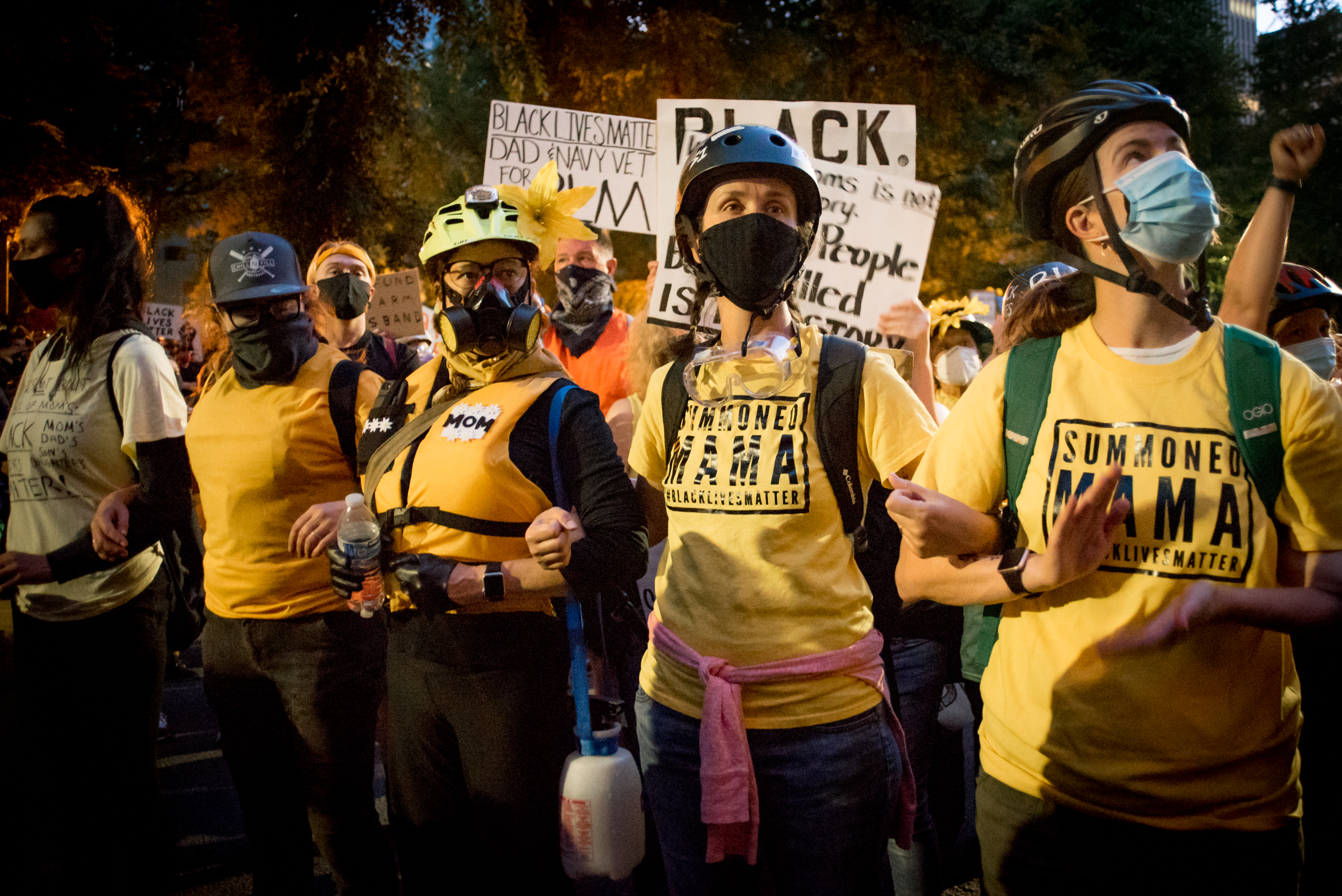
Wall of Moms at a protest, September 2020

- September 9 – Two people are killed by wildfires southeast of Salem; these are the first deaths of the year that are confirmed to have been caused by wildfires.
- September 14 – IQAir.com lists Portland as having the worst air quality in the world, due to ongoing wildfires across the entire West Coast.

=== November ===
- November 3 – Oregon holds elections for president, state representatives, ballot measures, and other issues.

=== December ===
- December 4 – COVID-19 pandemic: The Oregon Health Authority announces the state's 1,000th death from COVID-19.
- December 21 – A group of protesters breach the Oregon State Capitol, aided by Representative Mike Nearman, during a closed emergency session. The protesters engage in violent confrontations with police and are forced out of the building.

== Deaths ==
- January 2 – Nick Fish (born 1958), politician and lawyer who served on the Portland City Council
- March 16 – Jim Bartko (born 1965), University of Oregon athletics administrator
- March 31 – James A. Redden (born 1929), politician and judge
- April 4 – Arlene Schnitzer (born 1929), arts patron and philanthropist
- April 6 – Joan Dukes (born 1946 or 1947), politician and member of the Oregon State Senate
- April 19 – Duane Ackerson (born 1942), writer
- May 15 – Mitch Greenlick (born 1935), member of the Oregon House of Representatives
- June 10 – Harry Glickman (born 1924), founder of the Portland Trail Blazers
- June 13 – Jim Grelle (born 1936), middle-distance runner
- June 17 – Vic Gilliam (born 1953), politician and actor
- July 21 – Dean Ing (born 1931), writer and academic
- August 11 – Russell Kirsch (born 1929), inventor of the first digital scanner
- August 29 – Clifford Robinson (born 1966), basketball player with the Portland Trail Blazers
- August 31 – Hans. A. Linde (born 1924), legal scholar and justice of the Oregon Supreme Court
- September 8 – Glenn Anthony May (born 1945), historian
- September 21 – Bob Smith (born 1931), politician and rancher
- October 6 – Jim Weaver (born 1927), businessman and politician
- December 25 – Barry Lopez (born 1945), author

== See also ==
- 2020 in the United States
- 2020 in Washington (state)
