= Bartko =

Bartko is a surname. Notable people with the surname include:

- Jim Bartko (1965–2020), American college athletics administrator
- Ondrej Bartko (1915–2008), Slovak Lutheran pastor, theologian, publicist and film screenplay writer
- Robert Bartko (born 1975), German road bicycle and track cyclist
- Šimon Bartko (born 1996), Slovak biathlete
