= Bystrička =

Village and municipality in Slovakia

- Municipality
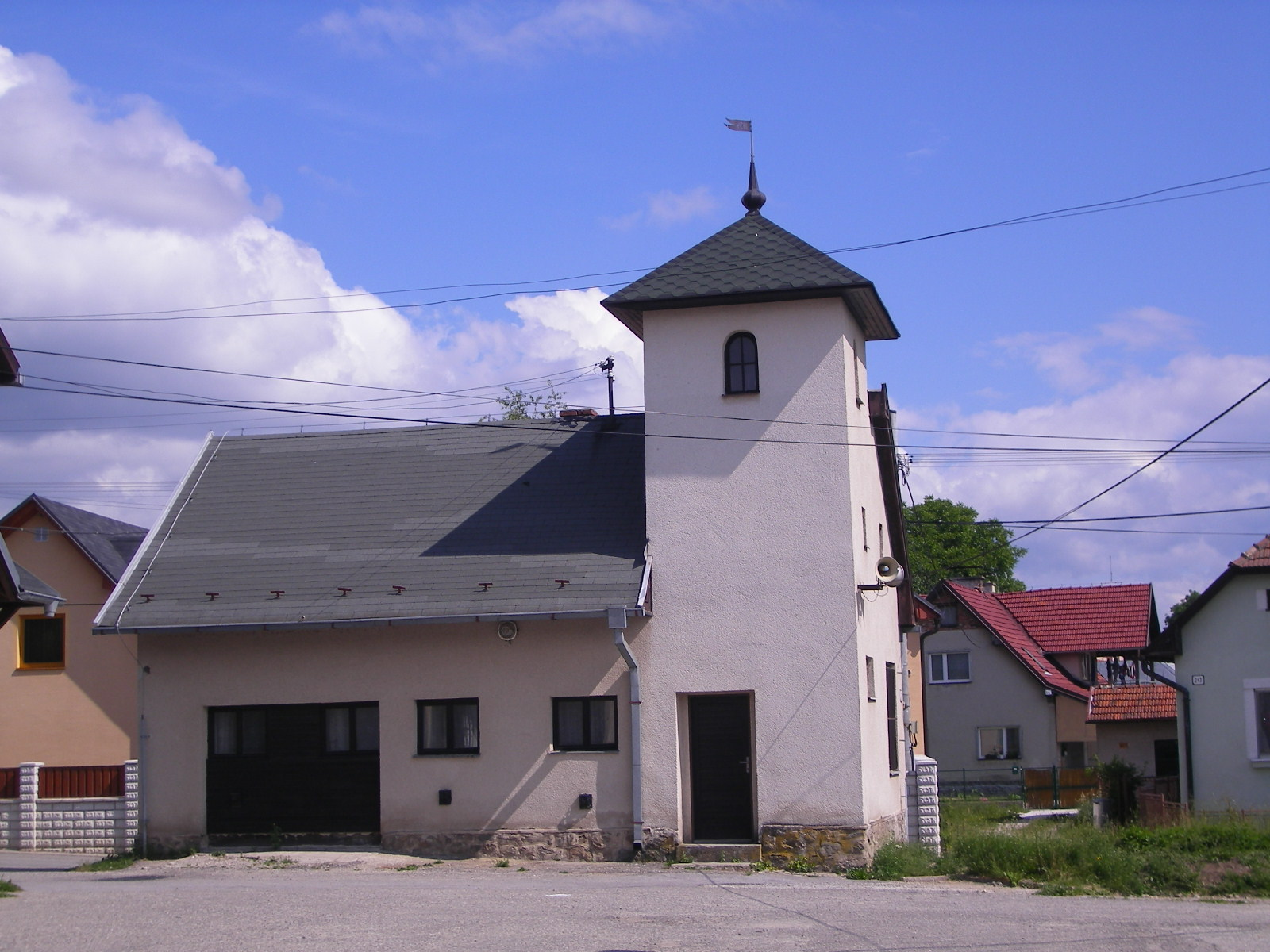

- Flag

- Location of Bystrička in the Žilina Region Location of Bystrička in Slovakia
- Coordinates: 49.05°N 18.88°E
- Country: Slovakia
- Region: Žilina Region
- District: Martin District
- First mentioned: 1258

Area
  - Total: 19.12 km^{2} (7.38 sq mi)
- Elevation: 449 m (1,473 ft)

Population (2025)
  - Total: 1,495
- Time zone: UTC+1 (CET)
  - Summer (DST): UTC+2 (CEST)
- Postal code: 360 1
- Area code: +421 43
- Vehicle registration plate (until 2022): MT
- Website: www.bystricka.sk

Bystrička (Hungarian: Turócbeszterce) is a village and municipality in Martin District in the Žilina Region of northern Slovakia.

== History ==
In historical records the village was first mentioned in 1258. Before the establishment of independent Czechoslovakia in 1918, it was part of Turóc County within the Kingdom of Hungary. From 1939 to 1945, it was part of the Slovak Republic.

== Geography ==
The municipality lies at an altitude of 449 metres (1,473 ft) and covers an area of 19.12 km^{2} (7.38 sq mi) (2025).

== Population ==
Population statistic (10 years)
Year	1995	2005	2015	2025
Count	1194	1388	1453	1495
Difference		+16.24%	+4.68%	+2.89%

Population statistic
Year	2024	2025
Count	1490	1495
Difference		+0.33%

It has a population of 1495 people (31 December 2025).

=== Ethnicity ===
Census 2021 (1+ %)
Ethnicity	Number	Fraction
Slovak	1432	97.01%
Not found out	30	2.03%
Czech	19	1.28%
Total	1476	

In year 2021 was 1476 people by ethnicity 1432 as Slovak, 30 as Not found out, 19 as Czech, 7 as Other, 3 as Rusyn, 2 as Serbian, 2 as Russian, 2 as Hungarian, 1 as Ukrainian, 1 as Canadian, 1 as French and 1 as English.

Note on population: The difference values of population numbers in the table "Population statistic" and in the sections "Ethnicity" & "Religion" is caused by the use of various statistical methods.

=== Religion ===
Census 2021 (1+ %)
Religion	Number	Fraction
None	628	42.55%
Roman Catholic Church	428	29%
Evangelical Church	306	20.73%
Not found out	49	3.32%
Total	1476	

In year 2021 was 1476 people by religion 628 from None, 428 from Roman Catholic Church, 306 from Evangelical Church, 49 from Not found out, 12 from Greek Catholic Church, 10 from Other and not ascertained christian church, 10 from Ad hoc movements, 9 from Islam, 5 from Other, 5 from United Methodist Church, 4 from Eastern Orthodox Church, 4 from Buddhism, 3 from Apostolic Church, 2 from Hinduism and 1 from Jehovah's Witnesses.

== Genealogical resources ==
The records for genealogical research are available at the state archive "Statny Archiv in Bytca, Slovakia"

- Roman Catholic church records (births/marriages/deaths): 1773-1941 (parish B)
- Lutheran church records (births/marriages/deaths): 1784-1904 (parish B)

== Notable people ==
- Viliam Žingor (1912–1950) - general, antifascist fighter

== See also ==
- List of municipalities and towns in Slovakia
