= Viliam Žingor =

Slovak partisan (1912-1950)

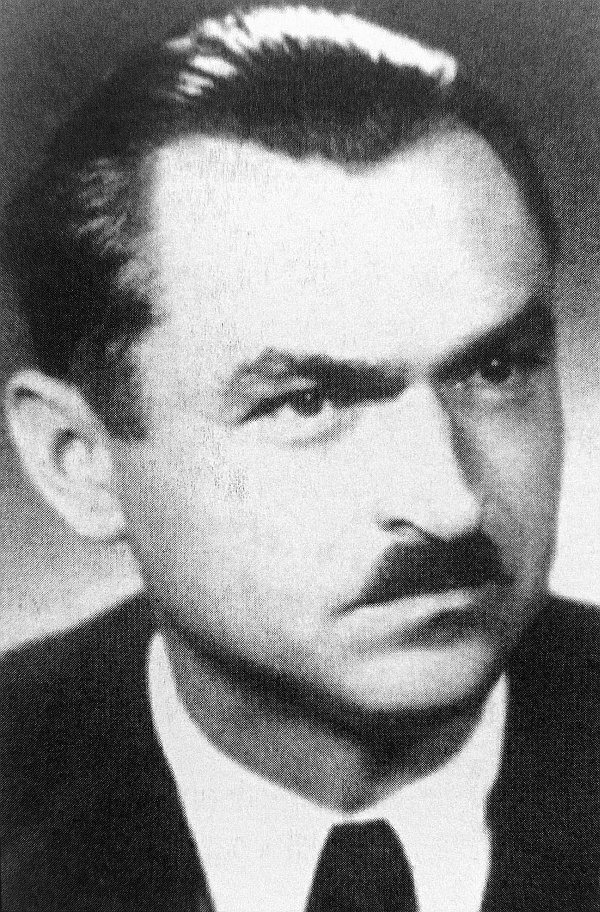
- Born: 30 July 1912; Bystrička, Kingdom of Hungary, Austria-Hungary
- Died: 18 December 1950 (aged 38); Bratislava, Czechoslovakia
- Known for: Commander of the 2nd Czechoslovak brigade during the Slovak National Uprising, victim of purges after the Communist takeover of Czehoslovakia
- Awards: Order of the Slovak National Uprising, 1st class (1946); Milan Rastislav Stefanik Order, 3rd class (1991, in memoriam)

Viliam Žingor (30 July 1912 – 18 December 1950) was a Slovak partisan, one of the leaders of the Slovak National Uprising.

== Early life ==
Viliam Žingor was born on 30 July 1912 in the village of Bystrička, Turóc County, Austria-Hungary to a Lutheran family. He started his education at the local school and in 1930 he graduated from a Gymnasium in the town of Martin.

Žingor studied for two years, but did not graduate, at the Mendel University in Brno. Instead of finishing his studies, he married young, had four children and helped at the family farm. Later on, he held several clerical and sales jobs. In his early adulthood, Žingor received basic military training during his military service with the artillery regiment in Žilina. At this time, he supported the Slovak National Party and advocated for autonomy of Slovakia within Czechoslovakia, but not its independence.

When Slovakia declared independence as a satellite of Nazi Germany, Žingor joined the fascist militia Hlinka Guard. He later explained this association as a part of the effort of the antifascists in his village to sabotage the organization from within. He briefly studied at the officer school in Bratislava and reached the rank of lieutenant. Afterwards, Žingor worked as a manager of a bookstore confiscated by the writer Ľudo Ondrejov from the Steiners, a Jewish family.

== Partisan activities ==
Žingor fought with the Slovak army in the short Slovak–Hungarian War in 1939 and in 1941 on the Eastern Front near the Ukrainian city of Lypovets as an artillery commander. According to his later testimony, Žingor fought the Hungarians in 1939 but avoided direct combat against Soviet troops and used his time in the Soviet Union to learn about the insurgency against Nazi troops. After several months at the front, he returned to Slovakia.

On 4 July 1943, Žingor received an order to return to the front as a part of a Slovak forces detachment set to reinforce the Axis troops at the Eastern Front. This time, Žingor ignored the order and instead hid in the mountains close to his home village. Over the course of the spring of 1944, he organized fellow deserters into a partisan group. During the following the summer, the newly formed group trained new recruits and gathered weapons and supplies. In August 1944, Žingor's group made contact with another partisan group established in the vicinity of a nearby village of Sklabiňa by the Soviet officer Pyotr Alexievich Velichko.

Velichko was dispatched to Slovakia by the command of the Soviet Army to organize resistance in Slovakia. Žingor was tasked by the resistance command to support Velichko. As a result of these developments, Žingor was given command of the Slovak unit within the 1st Czechoslovak Brigade. Nonetheless, relations between the two commanders quickly deteriorated. The cooling of relations was largely caused by the incident when partisans under the command of Velichko raided Sklabiňa and massacred over 140 locals suspected of being of German nationality of otherwise supporting the regime.

The partisan group under Žingor's command continued growing in size. At its peak it counted about 1,500 men. Among the new fighters was number of French captives who formed a unit under the Brigade under the command of captain Georges Barazer de Lannurien. As the time passed Žingor formed a close bond with de Lannurien. At the same time, Žingor's relationship with Velichko reached a critical point, in particular due to the Soviet commander's brutal methods and tolerance for looting. To ease the tensions, the resistance command ordered the creation of a separate 2nd Czechoslovak Brigade under Žingor's command.

After the outbreak of the Slovak National Uprising, the Brigade was in charge of the defense of the Rajec basin. The Brigade fought valiantly, being the only partisan grouping capable of holding ground against German forces without the assistance from insurgent units from the regular army. Nonetheless, the Brigade suffered massive casualties, which included Žingor's brother Bohuš. Following the defeat of the Uprising, the remains of the brigade, consisting of about 300 men, retreated to the mountains and limited its activities to defensive operations due to the critical shortage of equipment. The survivors eventually joined the advancing Soviet forces.

== After the war ==
After the end of the war, Žingor was awarded the Order of the Slovak National Uprising, 1st class and repeatedly promoted eventually reaching the rank of Mayor. He accepted the invitation of Karol Bacílek to became a member of the Communist Party of Slovakia. In the 1946 Czechoslovak parliamentary election he was elected MP. Until 1947 he also served as the deputy commander of the newly formed police force, Sbor národní bezpečnosti, for Central Slovakia and the chair of the Union of Slovak Partisans. During the trial of the fascist president of Slovakia Jozef Tiso he was a part of delegation of former partisans threatening to cause disorder if Tiso is not sentenced to death.

In spite of his career rise, Žingor quickly became dissatisfied with the political developments. He was politically upset by sidelining of former partisans at the expense of various well-connected individuals, who were unknown to the resistance movement during the war but suddenly claimed they had played crucial role in the anti-fascist struggle. Politically, he found himself in agreement with the opposition Democratic Party, rather than the Communists. In 1947 he left the Communist party.

=== Persecution and death ===
Žingor's persecution started right after the 1948 Czechoslovak coup d'état in February 1948. The new communist regime was irritated by Žingor's popularity as a partisan commander and his closeness to the Democratic Party as well as his insistence on keeping the Union of Slovak Partisans apolitical. On 5 March 1948, he was stripped of his parliament mandate. He was also relieved from all his official function.

In response to the prosecution, Žingor hid in a woods cabin owned by a fellow partisan Vlastislav Kováč together with Elena Lamošová, a woman Žingor got involved with after the breakdown of his marriage, who was pregnant with twins and her son from a previous relationship. Nonetheless, they were betrayed by the midwife they called to assist with the birth of the twins. Žingor was arrested on 27 November 1947 and accused of being a "mercenary in service of Capitalism" as well as a follower of Titoism, a common accusation at the time of the Tito–Stalin split. According to the usual practice imported from the Soviet Union, the trial with Žingor was proceeded by organized letters of his friends, co-workers. The Ministry of Justice published a pamphlet Red Hemingway written by Ladislav Mňačko, a fellow partisan, in which he accused Žingor of being a traitor to the Slovak National Uprising. Other formed partisan commanders also joined the ranks of the accusers, although some later claimed their signatures under a letter denouncing Žingor were fake. Žingor himself was tortured and forced to admit all his crimes and ideological sins.

Žingor was sentenced to death for treason and espionage after a three-day show trial on 21 October 1950. He stood accused alongside about 30 other "capitalists, landlords and traitors", including two other commanders of the 2nd Czechoslovak Brigade, Samuel Bibza and Ladislav Nosák, who also received death sentences. The execution by hanging took place on 18 December 1950 in Bratislava. Žingor's last hours were later described by the Lutheran pastor Ondrej Bartko who tended to him before the execution.

== Rehabilitation and legacy ==
The process of Žingor's rehabilitation was started in 1968, due to the shifting political climate caused by the Prague Spring. A court in Banská Bystrica ruled Žingor and his fellow accused were innocent. Nonetheless, the process was put on hold after the Warsaw Pact invasion of Czechoslovakia. Only after the return to democracy following the Velvet Revolution was Žingor fully rehabilitated, posthumously promoted to the rank of Brigadier General by the president Václav Havel and awarded the Milan Rastislav Stefanik Order, 3rd class.
