= Slovak partisans =

Fighters in the Slovak resistance movement

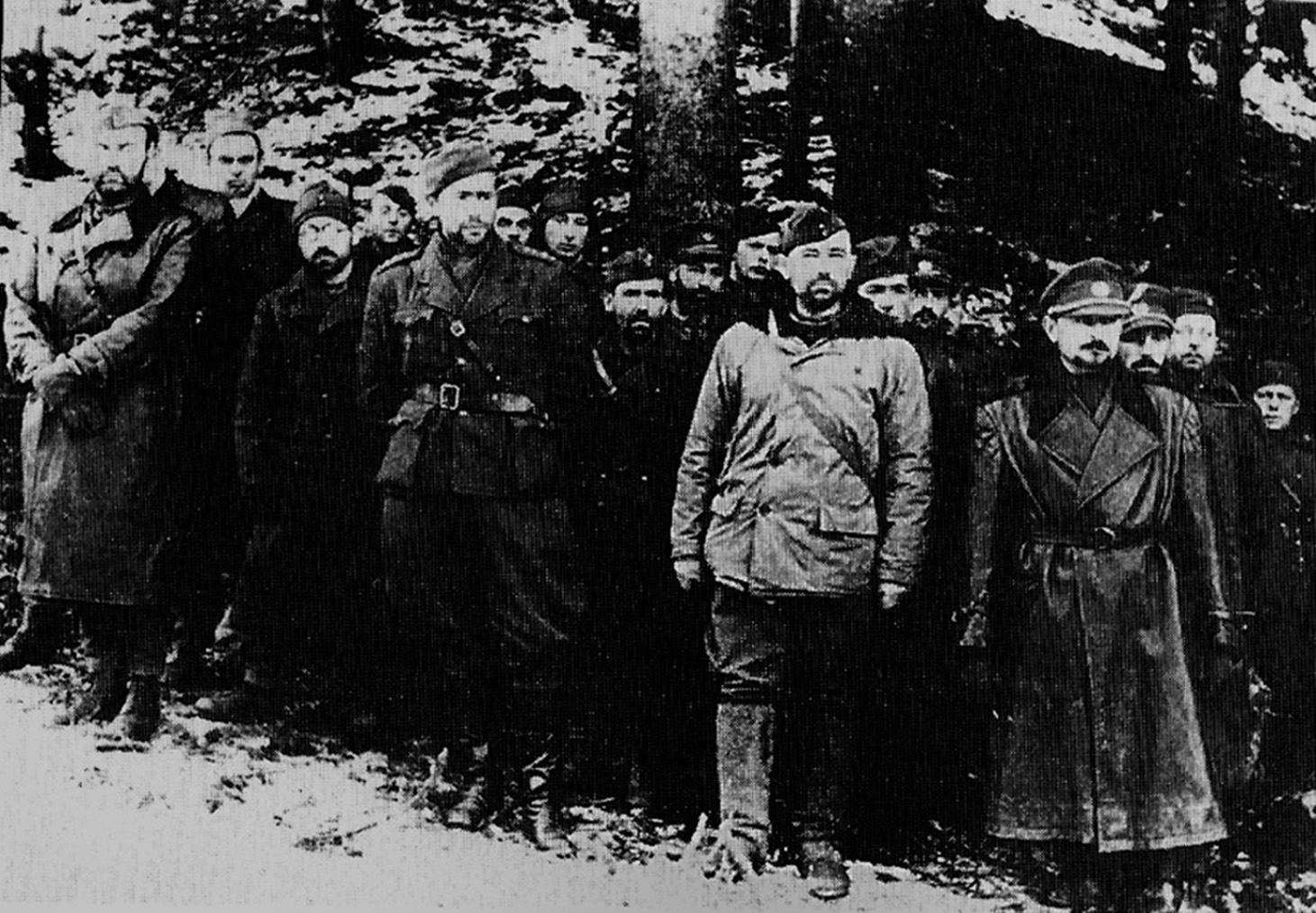
Stanislav Rejthar (light jacket) of the Slovak Insurgent Air Force with officers and men of the 2nd Czechoslovak Partisan Brigade

Slovak partisans were fighters in irregular military groups participating in the Slovak resistance movement, including against Nazi Germany and collaborationism during World War II.

== Beginning ==
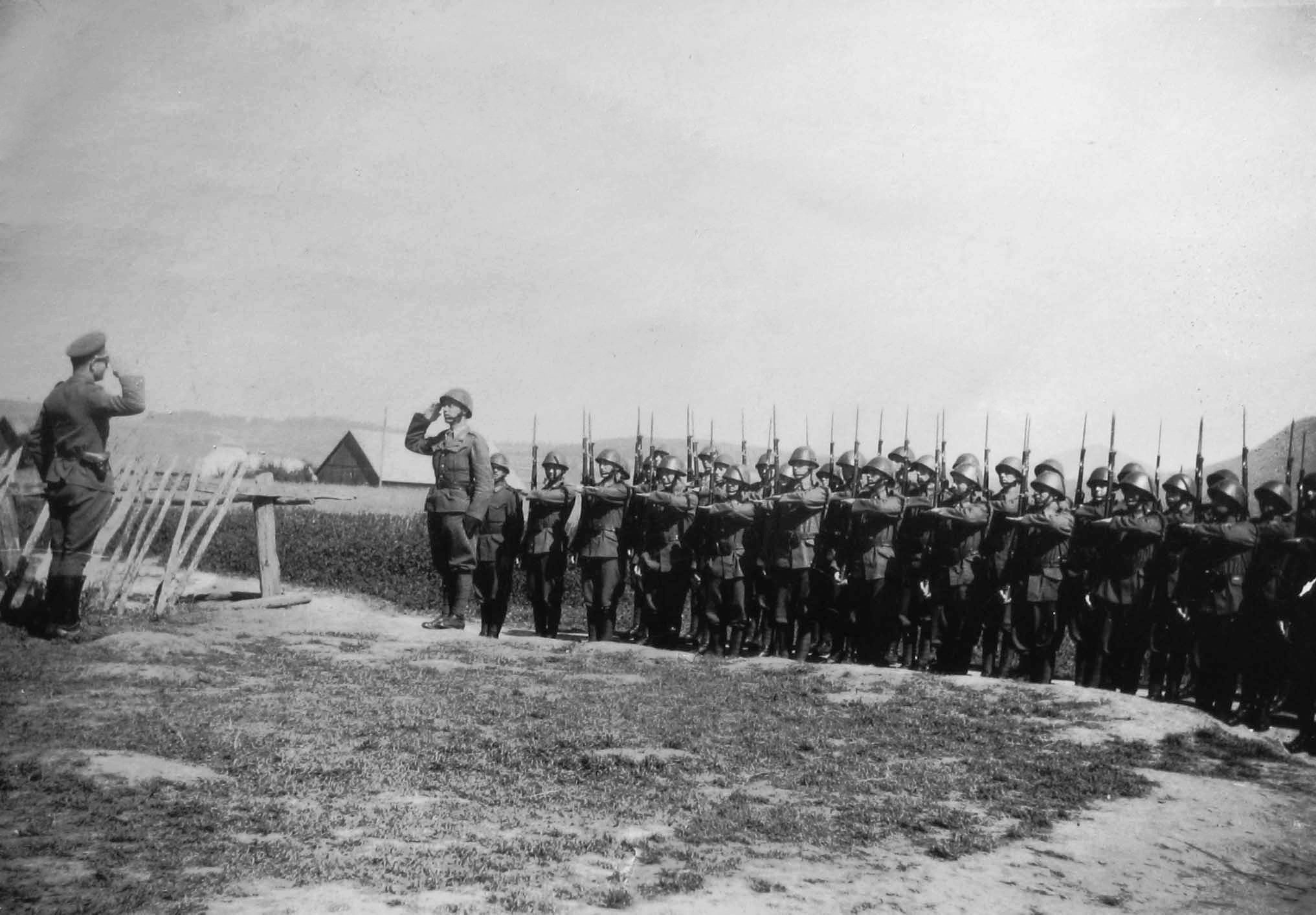
18th Anti Aircraft Artillery Battery, which took part in the Slovak National Uprising of Autumn 1944

Slovak partisans were an anti-fascist militia formed immediately following the creation of the First Slovak Republic in 1939, to fight against Nazis and their collaborators. Men and women both fought in the ranks of partisan units, as well as Jews and Christians alike. Slovak partisans had mixed loyalties as many were deeply nationalistic and wanted to maintain an independent Slovak Republic free of fascism, while many others were socialists who forged strong links with the Soviet Union and Soviet partisans. Slovak partisans mainly carried out acts of sabotage. Their largest anti-Nazi military engagement was the Slovak National Uprising in 1944, in which Slovak partisans were aided by the Slovak Army and Soviet partisans. Ján Golian and Rudolf Viest, generals in the Slovak Army, led the uprising, which was eventually crushed by the Germans and their Hungarian, Slovak and Ukrainian collaborators. The most famous Slovak partisan brigade was the M.R.Stefanik brigade led by the Slovak partisan hero Viliam Žingor. With 1300 members, it was the largest partisan brigade, and was fiercely nationalistic yet religiously tolerant, with over 300 Jewish members. After the war this brigade, and its leader, fell into disfavour among Czechoslovak Communist politicians, who accused Gustáv Husák of being a traitor to the Slovak nation and people. Zingor was eventually executed by Husák and the communist government on December 18, 1950. The Janosik brigade was another partisan brigade, which fought in the Tatra Mountains and Orava.

== Jewish brigades ==
Slovak Jewish partisans made outstanding accomplishments as members of all-Jewish groups. The most famous Slovak Jewish partisan unit was the Nováky Brigade, formed from the inmates of Novaky concentration camp. The Novaky brigade benefited from its strategic locale, as the camp was in a region populated by miners and farmers who had no sympathy for the pro-Nazi government. With the help of these friendly locals, the Novaky brigade made contacts with other partisans, and arranged to receive aid and weapons in the event of an armed uprising. In honour of their service to their country, 166 Jewish partisans were awarded the Order of the Slovak Uprising.

== Famous partisans ==
There were many famous Slovak partisans but none more famous than the famous Ján Nálepka, and Viliam Žingor.

- Martin Petrasek
- Rudolf Vrba
- Róbert Cvi Bornstein
- Ján Nálepka
- Viliam Žingor
- Emil Perko
- Karol Adler
- Haviva Reik
- Ludovit Kukorelli
- Jan Fedak
- Viola Valachova
- Katarina Chutkova
- Jan Kovac
- Zelma Steiner
- Egon Roth
- Jan Usiak
- Michal Pavlovic
- Milos Uher
- Irena Káňová
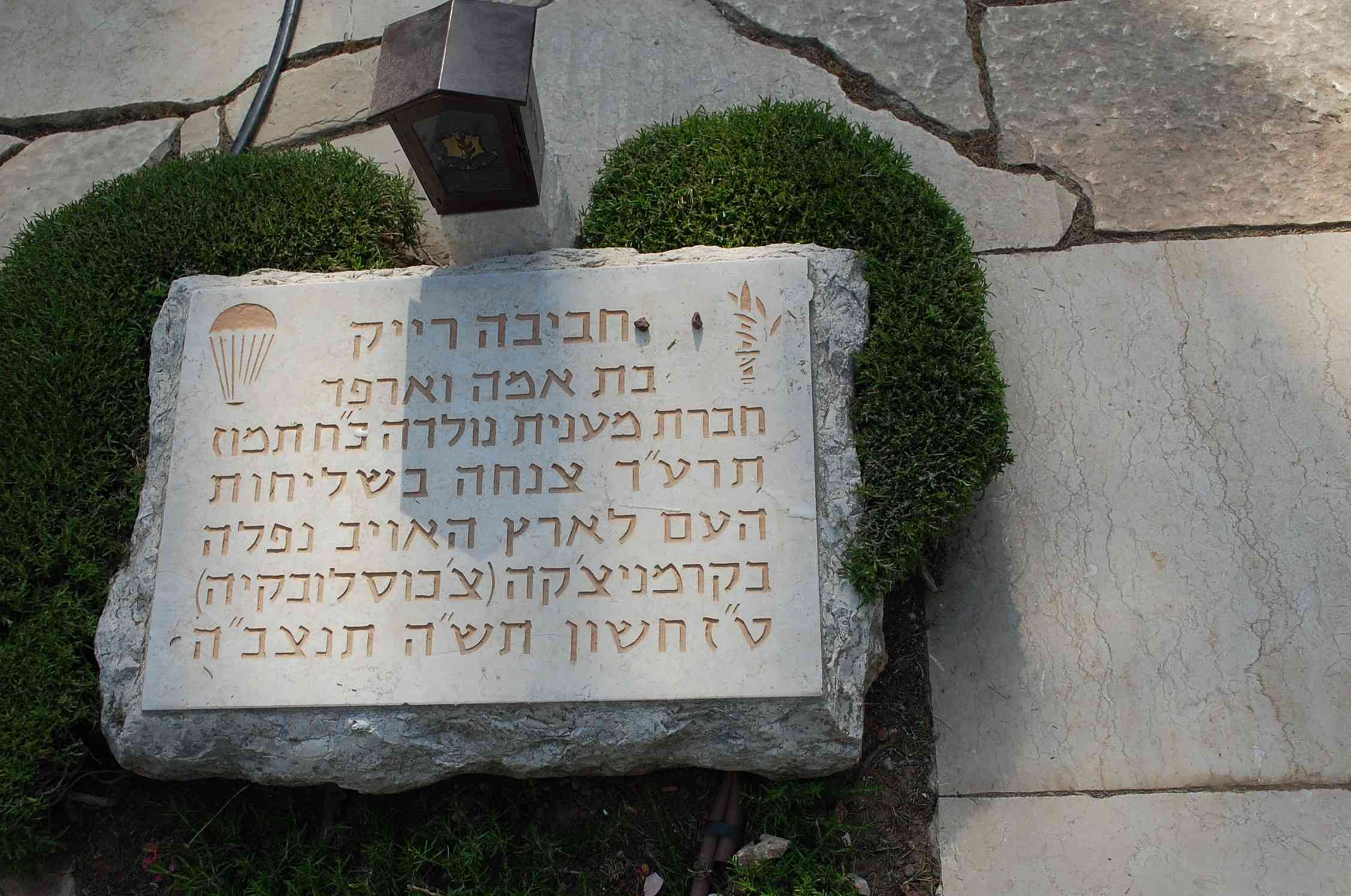
In Memoriam Chaviva Reikova Slovak-Jewish partisan

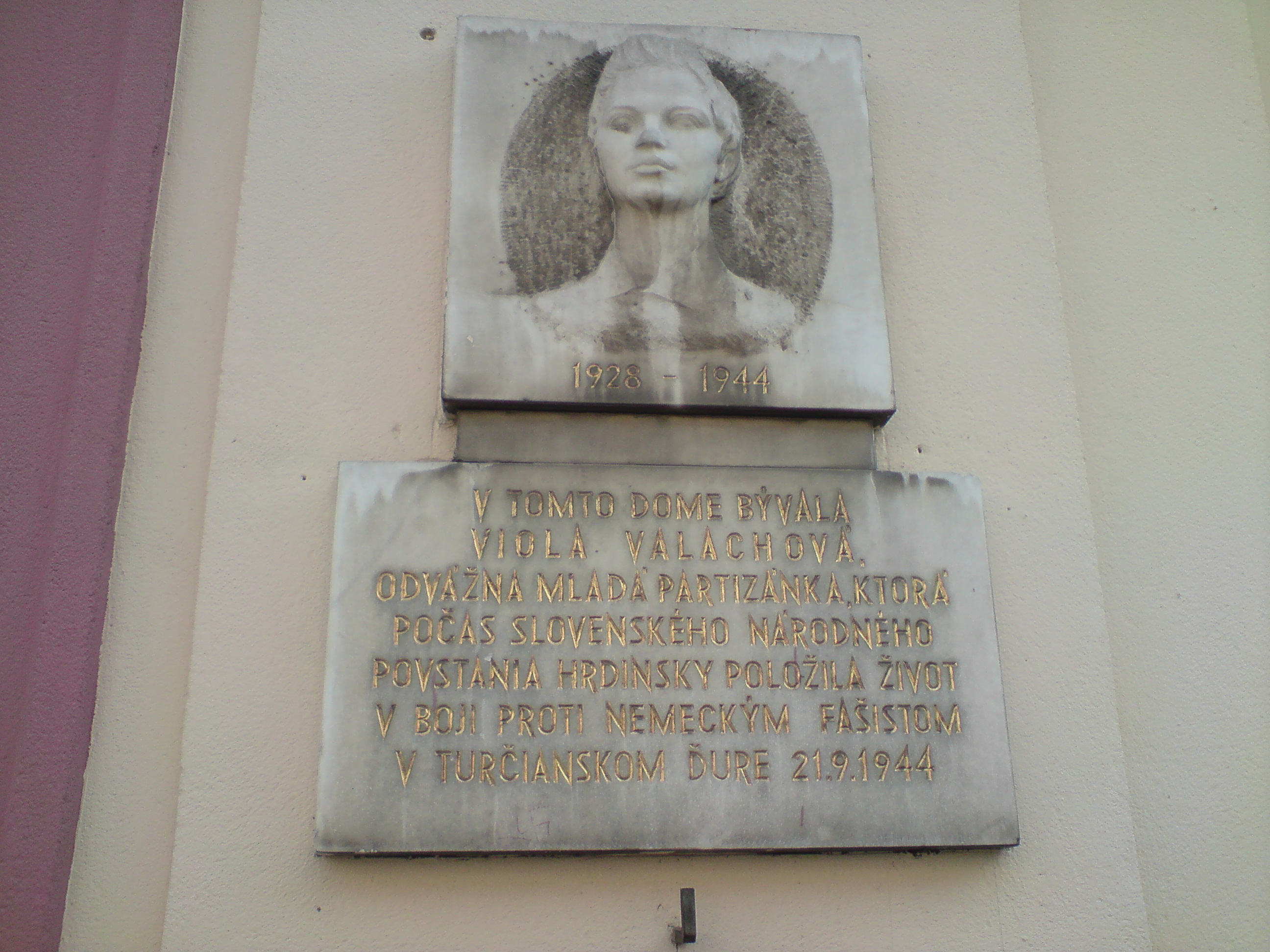
In Memoriam Viola Valachova partisan

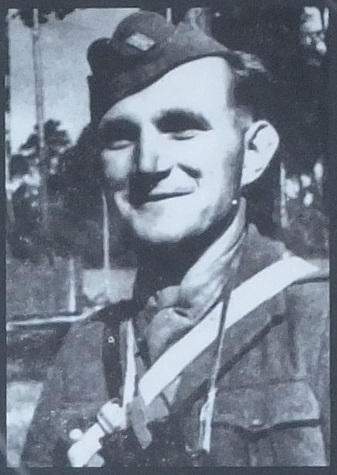
Jan Usiak partisan commander

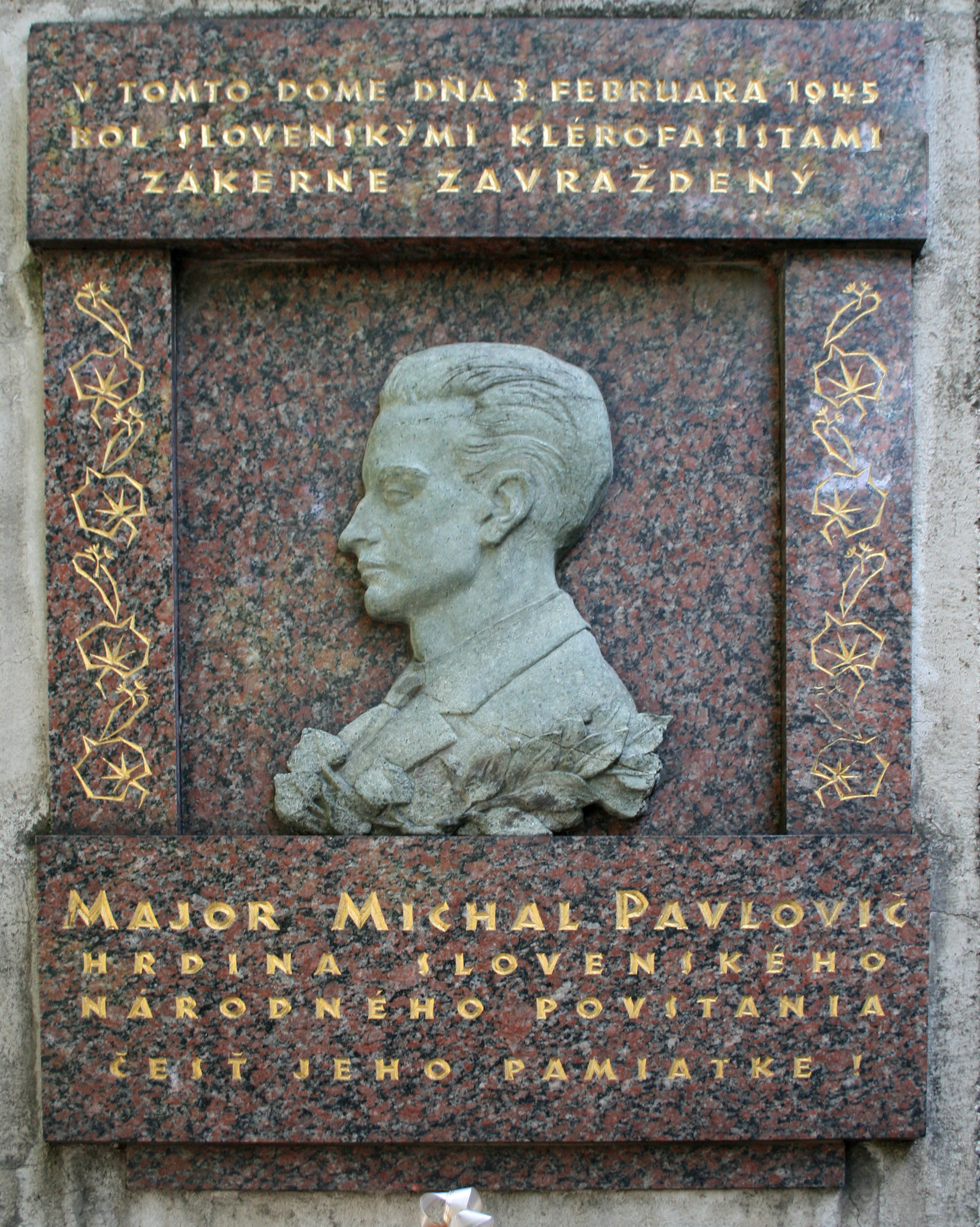
Michal Pavlovic partisan

== See also ==
- Partisan Congress riots
- Slovak National Uprising
- Central National Revolutionary Committee
