= Irena Káňová =

Slovak politician (1893–1963)

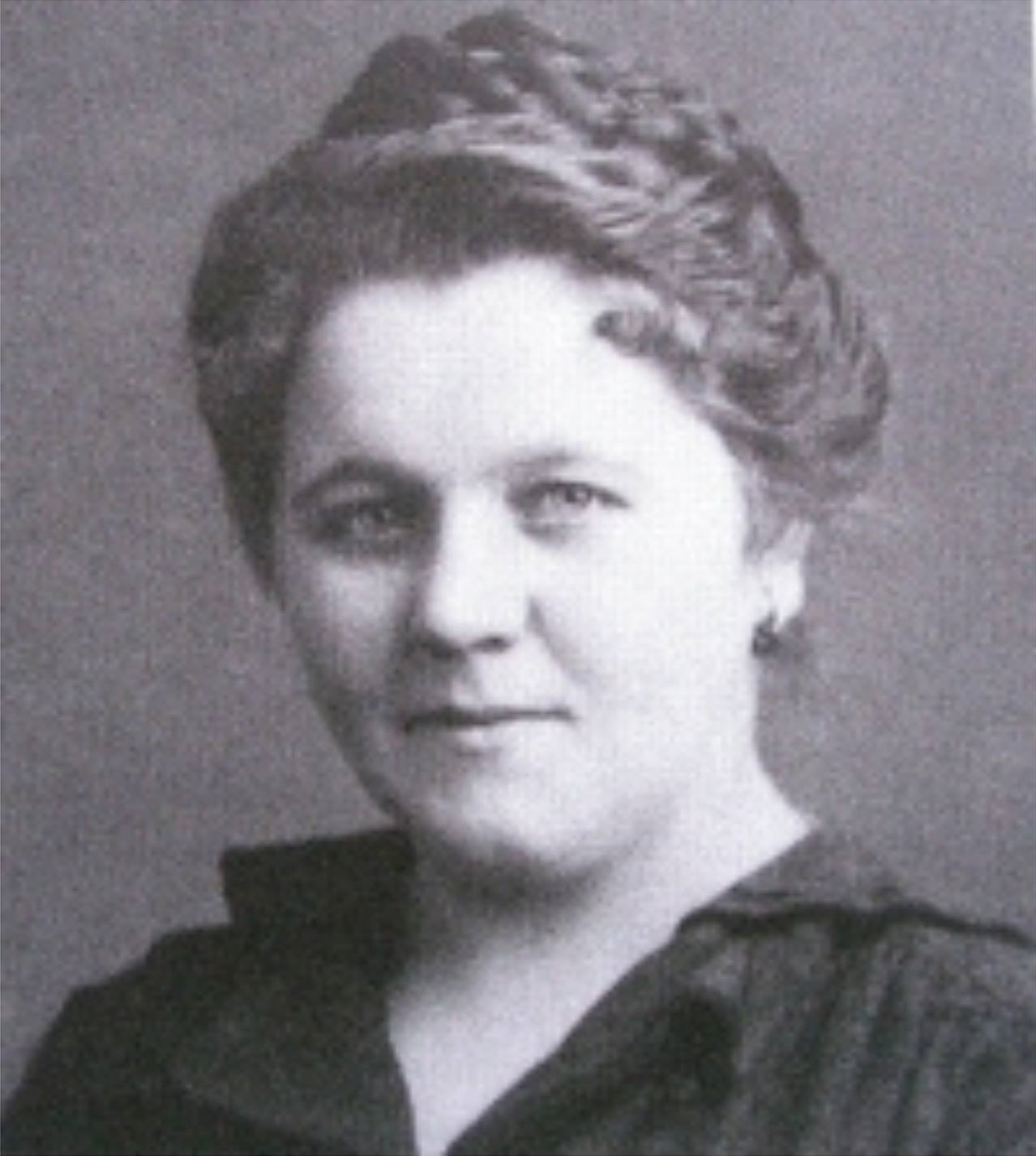
- Káňová c. 1920

Member of the Revolutionary National Assembly
- In office 5 December 1919 – 15 April 1920
- Preceded by: Alice Masaryková

Personal details
- Born: 5 April 1893 Selmecbánya, Kingdom of Hungary, Austria-Hungary
- Died: 8 April 1963 (aged 70) Žiar nad Hronom, Czechoslovakia
- Party: MSZDP (1917); ČSDSD (c. 1919–1921); KSČ (after 1921); KSS (after c. 1945)
- Spouse: Ján Kaňa
- Children: 3

Irena Káňová (5 April 1893 – 8 April 1963) was a Slovak politician who served in the Revolutionary National Assembly of Czechoslovakia from 1919 until 1920 as a member of the Social Democratic Workers' Party. She was the only Slovak woman to serve in the Czechoslovak parliament during the entire Interwar period. Following her tenure, Káňová joined the Communist Party of Czechoslovakia and organized labor strikes. She was a member of the Slovak resistance during World War II.

== Biography ==
Irena Káňová was born on 5 April 1893 in the town of Banská Štiavnica in central Slovakia, then part of the Kingdom of Hungary within the Austro-Hungarian Empire. Her parents were Anton Frindt and Anna Chválová. Her father worked as a shoemaker, and she had two brothers. Káňová attended local schools in Banská Štiavnica. Her husband was shoemaker Ján Kaňa, and they had two daughters and one son together. From 1919 until her retirement in 1949, Káňová worked at a tobacco factory in Banská Štiavnica.

Káňová joined the Social Democratic Party of Hungary in 1917, and was interred in Terezín during the First Hungarian Republic for organizing class conflict. After the formation of Czechoslovakia, she joined the Czechoslovak Social Democratic Workers' Party.

On 5 December 1919, Káňová was appointed to the Revolutionary National Assembly of the First Czechoslovak Republic to finish the term of Alice Masaryková. Aged 26, Káňová was the youngest member of parliament and was the only Slovak woman to serve in the Czechoslovak parliament during the entire Interwar period. Her tenure began before women were granted suffrage in Czechoslovakia, which occurred on 29 February 1920. While in parliament, she advocated for legislation regarding breastfeeding, along with Anna Sychravová. Káňová served until the end of her term on 15 April 1920.

In 1921, Káňová joined the newly-formed Communist Party of Czechoslovakia and distributed the party magazine Proletárka. She was also involved in the Czechoslovak women's movement and organized labor strikes.

During World War II, Káňová and her husband were members of the Slovak resistance. Following the war, she was an active member of the Communist Party of Slovakia and the Slovak Women's Union. She also served as a local party official during this period.

Káňová died in Žiar nad Hronom on 8 April 1963.
