= Ondrej Bartko =

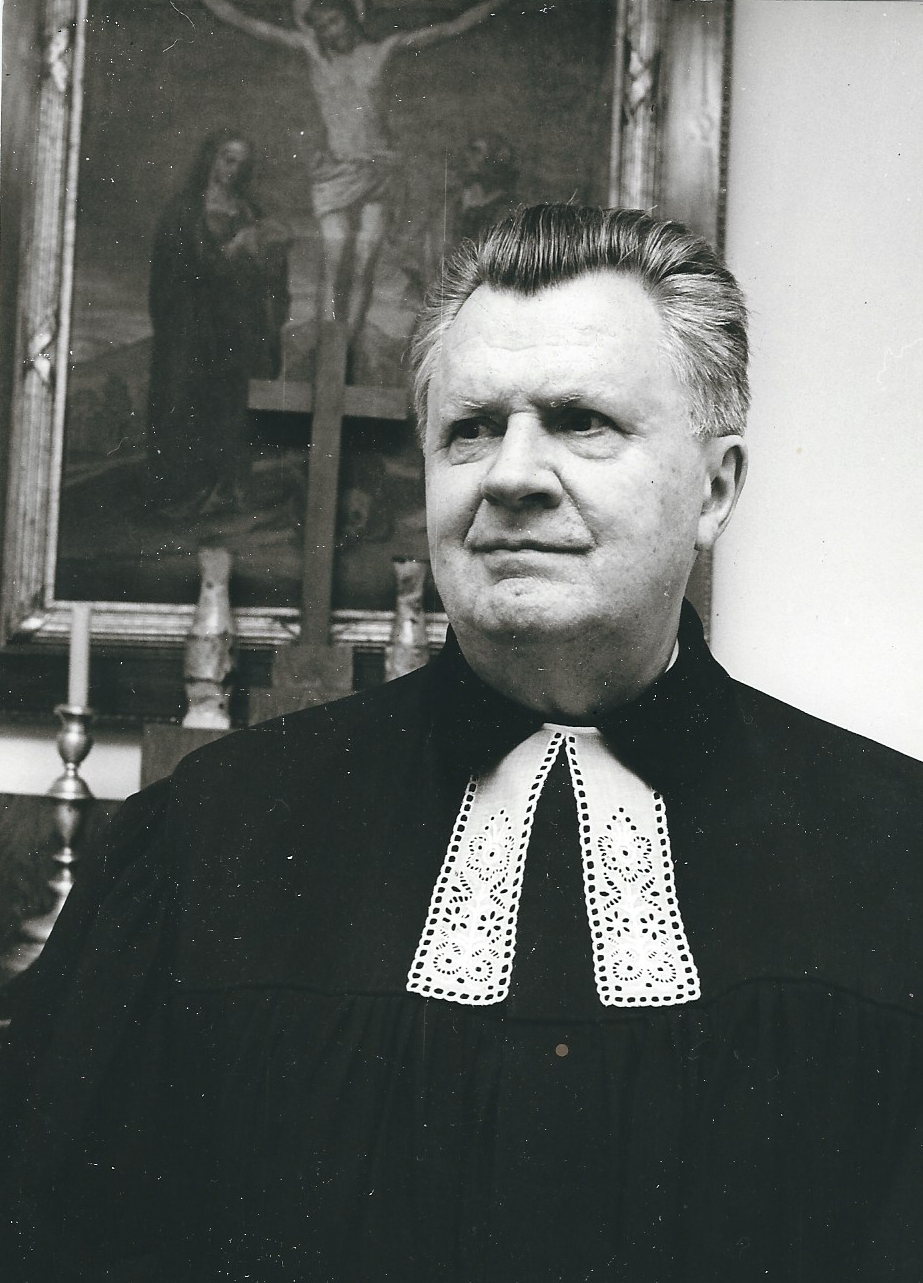
- Born: August 13, 1915; Vazec, Slovakia
- Died: June 13, 2008 (aged 92); Bratislava, Slovakia
- Occupation(s): Pastor, Theologian, Publicist and Screenplay writer

Ondrej Bartko, ThB (born 13 August 1915) was a Slovak Lutheran pastor, theologian, publicist and film screenplay writer.

== Biography ==
Born on 13 August 1915 in a farming family in Vazec, Slovakia. His father died during the World War I in Halic in 1915 and was pronounced unaccounted for. His mother died in July 1932 when he was a student at the M.M.Hodza Secondary School in Liptovsky Mikulas from which he graduated in 1933. He received a Scholarship from the President of Czechoslovak Republic T.G. Masaryk and continued his studies at the Faculty of Lutheran Theology at the Czechoslovak State University in Bratislava.

Upon completing his studies, he was among the first graduates from this Faculty and was awarded the title of ThB. (Baccalaureatus Theologiae), title which was given only to those who achieved the highest marks at all 10 oral and 3 written State Exams which were undertaken upon graduation.

During his studies at the Faculty of Lutheran Theology, he was elected to the Slovak Student Council (1933–1937, G. Husak, J. Pull, M. Lokvencova, V. Bezak, Kirschbaum, Nukovic et al.). As he later described in his autobiography: “The Council was at that time composed of half right wing and half left wing politically leaning personalities. I didn’t want to nor I could let myself be the deciding vote during voting on Council resolutions so I decided that it would be better to resign from the Council which I later did.” He was also elected and became Chair of the Hurban Club at the Faculty of Theology and Chair of Dr. Michal Lucansky's National Lutheran Youth Organization. He was ordained to a Lutheran Pastor by the Bishop Dr. Vladimir Cobrda on 27 June 1937 in Bratislava's New Church on Legionarska Street.

During 1937-38 he was a Bishop's Chaplain in Bratislava (to Bishop Dr. Samuael Osusky) and a Regional Chaplain in Trencin (1939-1941 under Senior Jan Zeman). In Trencin, he war an editor and publisher of magazine Spark (Iskra), which was later, closed down by the Slovak State authorities. On the occasion of leaving Trencin for his first pastoral post in Ksinna, he was named an Honorary Chair of the National Lutheran Youth Organization.

In 1942 he married Anna Jurcova (born on 2 October 1923 and died on 23 August 2007 in Bratislava, who wrote poetry under the pseudonym of Anna Zelenicka). Together they had 3 sons: Ivan Bartko P. Eng. Born in Horne Zelenice who immigrated to Canada in 1969. In 1966 he completed studies in Electrical Engineering at the Slovak Technical University in Bratislava and in 1972 M.Sc. Program in Electrical Engineering at the University of Alberta in Edmonton, Canada. He retired from Ontario Hydro and Ontario Power Generation after 30 year service and now lives with his wife Ann Natalia in Brampton, Ontario; Mgr. Art. Fedor Bartko born in Ksinna and Mgr. Ondrej Bartko Jr. born in Bratislava.

During the period 1941-1947 he was a pastor in Ksinna, where he was a member of the Town Council. At the beginning of September 1944 shortly after the beginning of the Slovak National Uprising (SNP) with the assistance from the Commander of the Czechoslovak Zizka Military Battalion Capt. Teodor Pol and Ltn. Rudolf Ryban, he reinstated in Ksinna allegiance to the Government of the Czechoslovak Republic in exile. He is a holder of the Czechoslovak War Cross 1939 and other decorations for his leadership and work during the Slovak National Uprising.

He was a pastor in Bratislava during the period 1947 to 1993, first at the Large Church on Panenska Street and from 1952 at the New Church on Legionarska Street and, at the same time, at the Small Church on Panenska Street. He was a pastor for both Slovak and German church members living in Bratislava. During 1948 to 1952 he was also the Resident Pastor and spiritual leader at Lutheran Hospital and Old Age Home in Bratislava and a Vice-Senior of Bratislava District for 25 years. With his wife Anna he is buried in Slavicie Udolie Cemetery in Bratislava (Section XIII, plot No. 287).

== Literary work ==
He is an author of many sermons published in periodicals such as Novy Rod, Cirkevne Listy, Evanjelisky Posol spod Tatier, Straz na Sione and Trnavsky Kalendar. His thoughts and mini-sermons were broadcast on radio and in the television programs such as Zamyslenie na Dnesny Den, Slovo, Duchovne Slovo, Cesty, Kvapky, Radost, Pokoj Vam and others.

He wrote screenplays for television documentary films Jan Cajak (1996), Stefan Krcmery (2001), Ludovit Sensel (2001), Ludmila Podjavorinska (2003) and Potrebujem Tvoje Ruky (2004). He appeared regularly in the television program Osobnosti Duchovneho Zivota where he shared his memories and discussions he had with many distinguished personalities in Slovak cultural life. He gave his personal account of the last hours of Viliam Žingor, commander of one of the military groups in the Slovak National Uprising and who was executed by the Communist regime (Slovak Television 1991, screenplay Milan Varsik, directed by Fedor Bartko).

He co-authored the publication Bratislava – Lutheran Churches (1995); edited collection of spiritual poetry of Martin Razus titled Pred Bozi Tron (published by Tranoscius in 1995) and poetry of E.B. Lukac titled Kam Ho Polozili (Tranoscius 2011) for which he also wrote the Epilog; and in co-operation with Jan Buncak Jr. he translated the book titled Funf Minuten Kirchen-Kunde (published by Evangelische Verlagsanstalt in Berlin in 1969) from German to Slovak.
