= George Floyd protests in Oregon =

2020 civil unrest after the murder of George Floyd

- Part of George Floyd protests
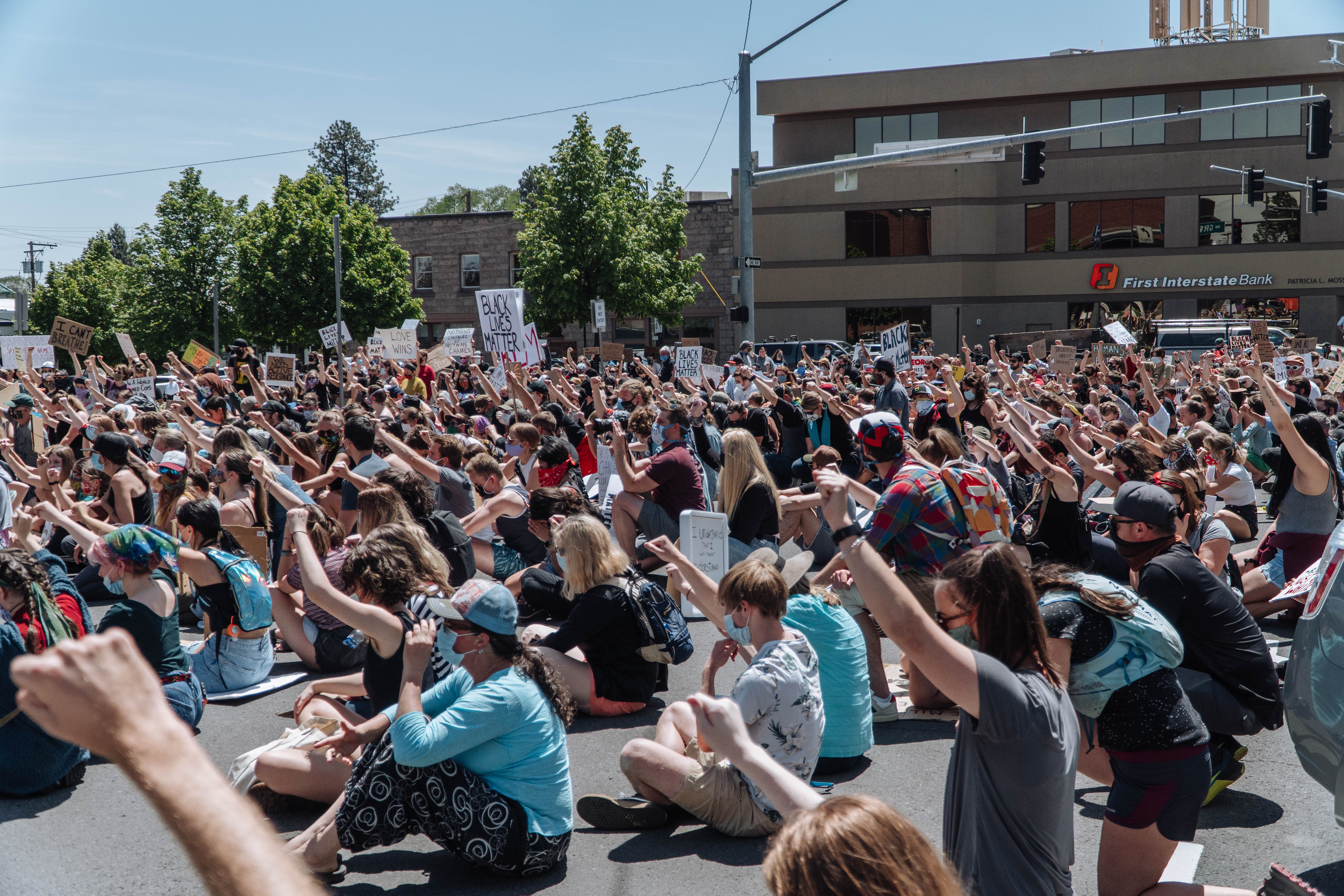
- Protesters kneel for a moment of silence in front of the Deschutes County Courthouse in Bend, Oregon, on June 2.
- Date: May 29, 2020 – 2021 (1 year)
- Location: Oregon, United States
- Caused by: Police brutality; Institutional racism against African Americans; Reaction to the murder of George Floyd; Economic, racial and social inequality

This is a list of George Floyd protests in the U.S. state of Oregon.

== Locations ==
=== Albany ===
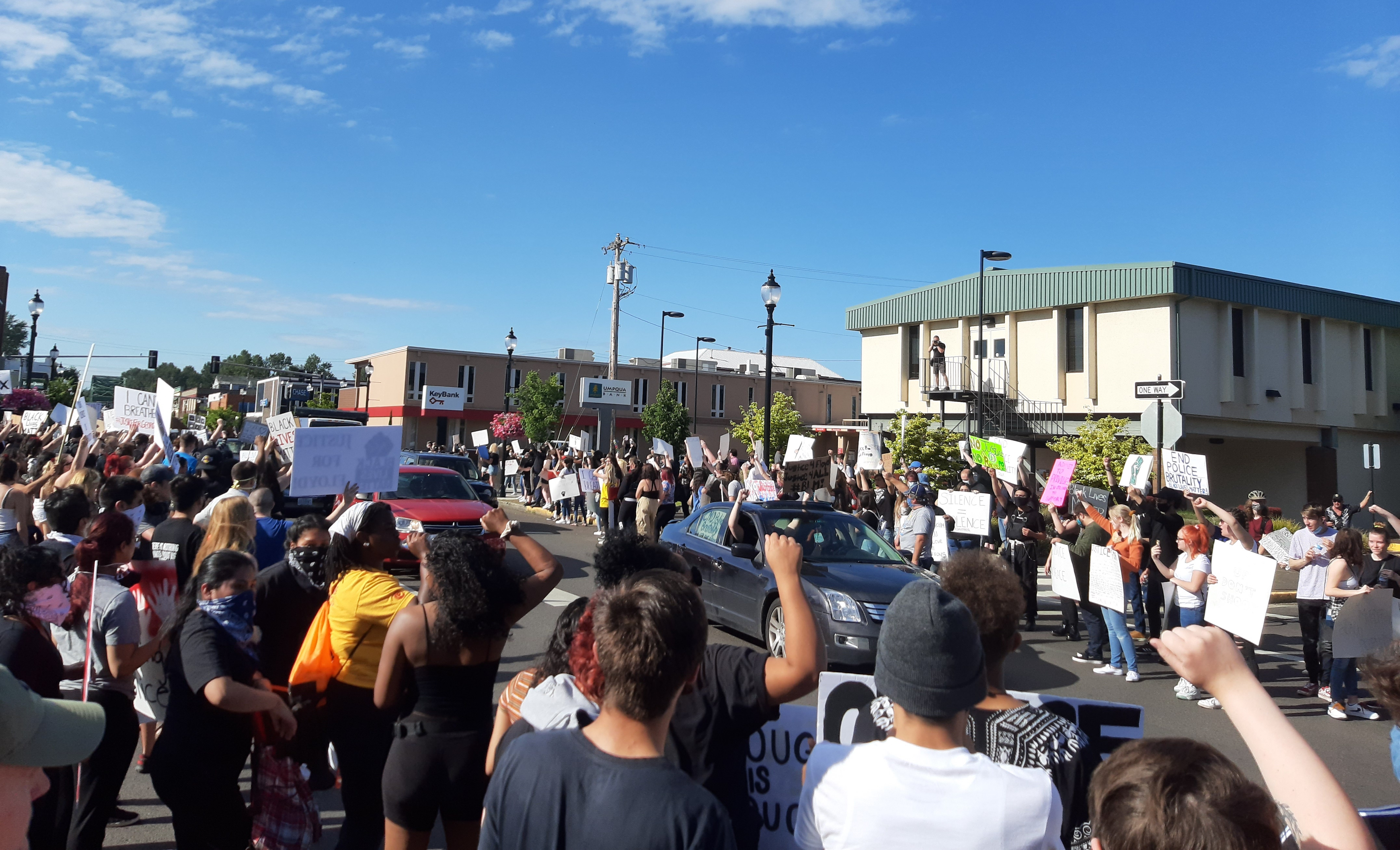
Protesters line Ellsworth Street in downtown Albany, Oregon on June 2

1,000 peaceful protesters lined Ellsworth Street in Downtown Albany on June 2, calling for racial justice. After two hours the group moved to city hall where they knelt for nine minutes of silence in memory of George Floyd.

=== Ashland ===
Hundreds gathered for two different protests on May 31, one starting at Lithia Park, the other at Ashland Plaza. The two groups eventually merged marching in downtown Ashland.

=== Astoria ===
A small group protested in front of the Post Office on May 29. On May 31, another protest was held in front of the Maritime Museum where George Floyd protesters were met with a counter protest. A 16-year-old high school student from Warrenton organized a protest that drew about fifty people in front of the Astorial post office on Thursday, June 4.

=== Beaverton ===
On June 5, hundreds of people marched from Sunset High School to the Nike World Headquarters in Beaverton, in an event led by the school's Black Student Union.

=== Bend ===
On May 30, hundreds attended a Justice for George Floyd rally in downtown Bend. On June 6, nearly 2,000 protesters marched from Farewell Bend Park to the Deschutes County Courthouse. Another demonstration took place on June 14 with a sit-in protest at Drake Park.

In August 2020, protesters clashed with federal Immigration Customs and Enforcement agents when they arrested two immigrants.

=== Brookings ===
On June 2, about 50 people gathered at Chetco Avenue to honor the memory of George Floyd. During the demonstration, protesters took a knee for eight minutes and forty-six seconds.

=== Burns ===
On May 31, at least 10 people gathered on a corner in downtown Burns with signs of support for George Floyd and the Black Lives Matter movement.

=== Coos Bay ===
On June 6, around 400 people protested along Highway 101. One man was arrested after pulling a gun on the ground.

=== Corvallis ===
Protesters gathered around city hall with signs in support and recognition of the Black Lives Matter movement, flashing the signs toward passing vehicles. Many drivers honked their horns and shook their fists as an act of solidarity for the group. Activists could be seen chanting around the sidewalks of downtown Corvallis, eventually making their way to the local police station. Most chants were designed to remember the memory of George Floyd and highlight the perceived racial inequities seen throughout the country. The protest was entirely peaceful in its nature, taking place over the course of two hours and involved around 50 protesters. There were few signs of involvement from law enforcement throughout the protest, limited to a single sheriff's vehicle driving past the crowd. On May 31, about 2,000 people chanted "No Justice, No Peace" outside the Benton County Courthouse. American Sign Language interpreters translated the passionate speeches.

=== Eugene ===
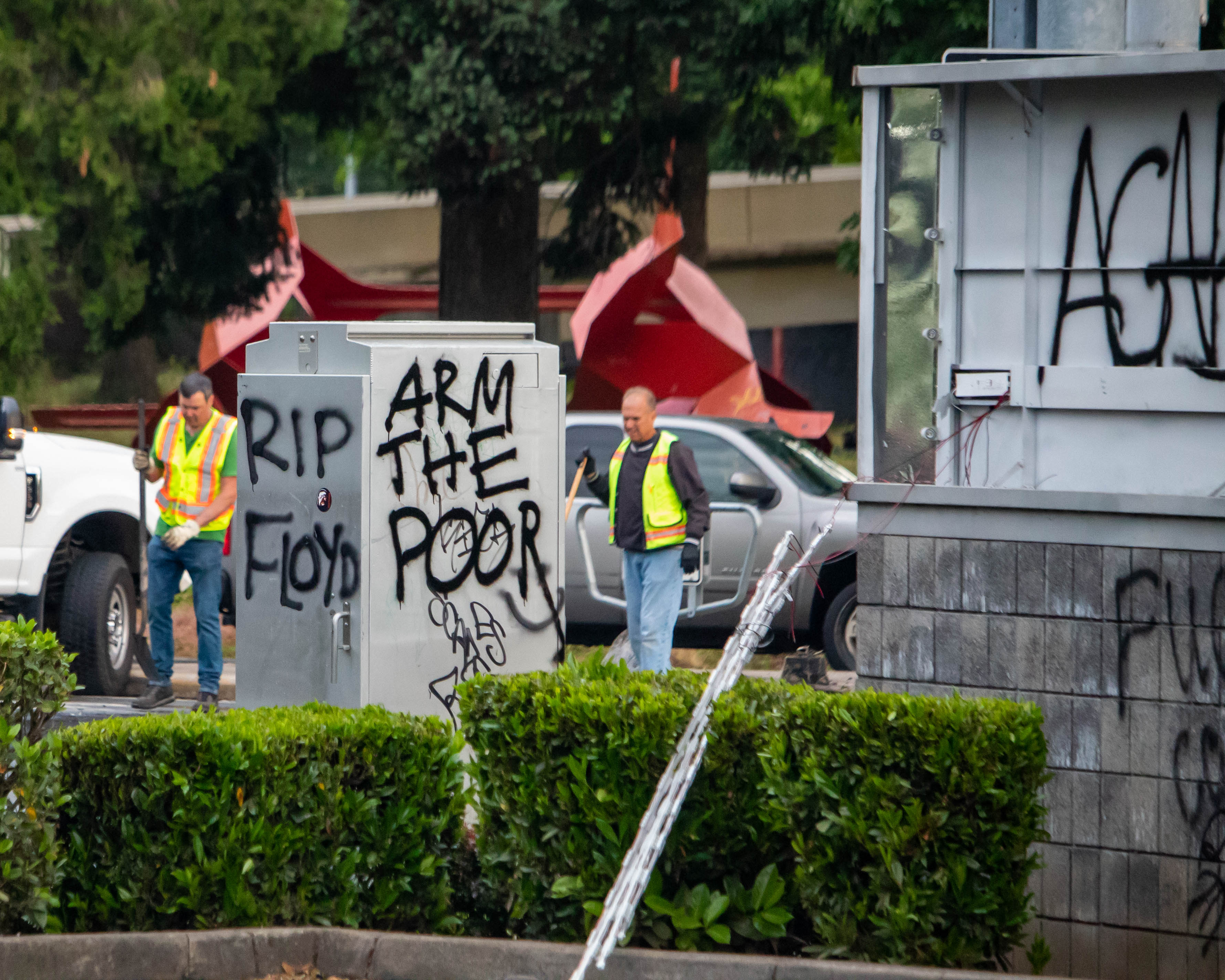
Graffiti following a demonstration in Eugene, Oregon

A crowd of 200 to 300 people gathered on May 29 to protest downtown. Some protesters disrupted traffic and knocked trash and newsstands into the street in the downtown. Rioters crowded on to Highway I-105 and began setting fire to a nearby road sign. That night, fires were set and windows were smashed. Around 11 p.m., they created a bonfire in the street, consisting of throwing in traffic cones, newspapers, signs from local businesses, and other items. No arrests were made. Protests in Eugene continued for ten straight days, as of June 7. A protest on June 5 drew about 300 people.

Protests - including marches, rallies, and teach-ins - continued every day through at least June 11.

On June 13 protesters toppled the Pioneer and the Pioneer Mother during a protest of Matthew Deady (controversially the namesake of a University of Oregon building).

=== Forest Grove ===
On June 2, 300 assembled beneath the large flag pole located between Maple and Laurel Streets to protest police brutality against Blacks.

=== Grants Pass ===
On June 2, 300 to 500 protesters gathered in front of the Josephine County Court House to protest the murder of George Floyd. Across the street a group of 50, some armed, stood in front of the Josephine County Republican Headquarters.

=== Happy Valley ===
On June 3, more than 100 protesters marched from Clackamas High School to Happy Valley City Hall.

=== Hermiston ===
On June 1, about 60 protesters stood on an intersection, holding signs reading “Black Lives Matter”, “No Justice, No Peace”, “All lives don’t matter until black lives matter”, and other messages.

=== Hillsboro ===
Approximately 400 people assembled in the plaza at the Hillsboro Civic Center on June 5 to protest police brutality.

=== John Day ===
About 100 people protested on June 5, marching down Third Street and to Highway 395. Armed citizens guarded businesses to prevent looting, although the demonstration remained peaceful.

=== Klamath Falls ===
On the night of May 31, 200 gathered at Sugarman's Corner to protest the murder of George Floyd. Across the street hundreds of armed anti-antifa counter protesters gathered. Rumors had circulated on local social media that out of town antifa buses loaded with bricks would arrive that night. This included a message screenshot from Oregon Air National Guard 173rd Fighter Wing Commander Col. Jeff Edwards which stated "Team Kingsley, for your safety I ask you to please avoid the downtown area this evening. We received an alert that there may be two busloads of ANTIFA protesters en route to Klamath Falls and arriving in downtown around 2,030 tonight." The busloads of antifa never did arrive. Police stood in the street to keep the two groups, one chanting "George Floyd" and the other chanting "USA" and "Go Home", separated. Police only made a single citation. Dozens continued to gather and protest Floyd's murder every night at Sugrman's Corner. Musician Frederick Brigham, who goes by the name "Wreck the Rebel," praised the unity among races in the demonstrations in an interview that aired June 2.

=== La Grande ===
A group of 20 gathered in front City Hall on Saturday, May 31, led by an 11-year-old who "wanted to bring home the fight for racial equality. Following her lead, about five hundred people gathered in front of the City Hall and Library on June 2.

=== Lake Oswego ===
On June 5, hundreds of protesters demonstrated in support of Black Lives Matter in Millennium Plaza Park. Moms United for Black Lives held another protest in Lake Oswego on October 25, marching from Rossman Park through the city.

=== Lebanon ===
On June 14, over 300 people marched from Century Park to Academy Square to demand racial justice.

=== Lincoln City ===
A vigil for George Floyd was held along US Highway 101 at D River State Park on June 1.

=== McMinnville ===
Hundreds of people gathered along Adams and Second streets in McMinnville on June 2, in a peaceful protest against systemic racism and police brutality, holding signs as a constant stream of car horns blared.

=== Medford ===
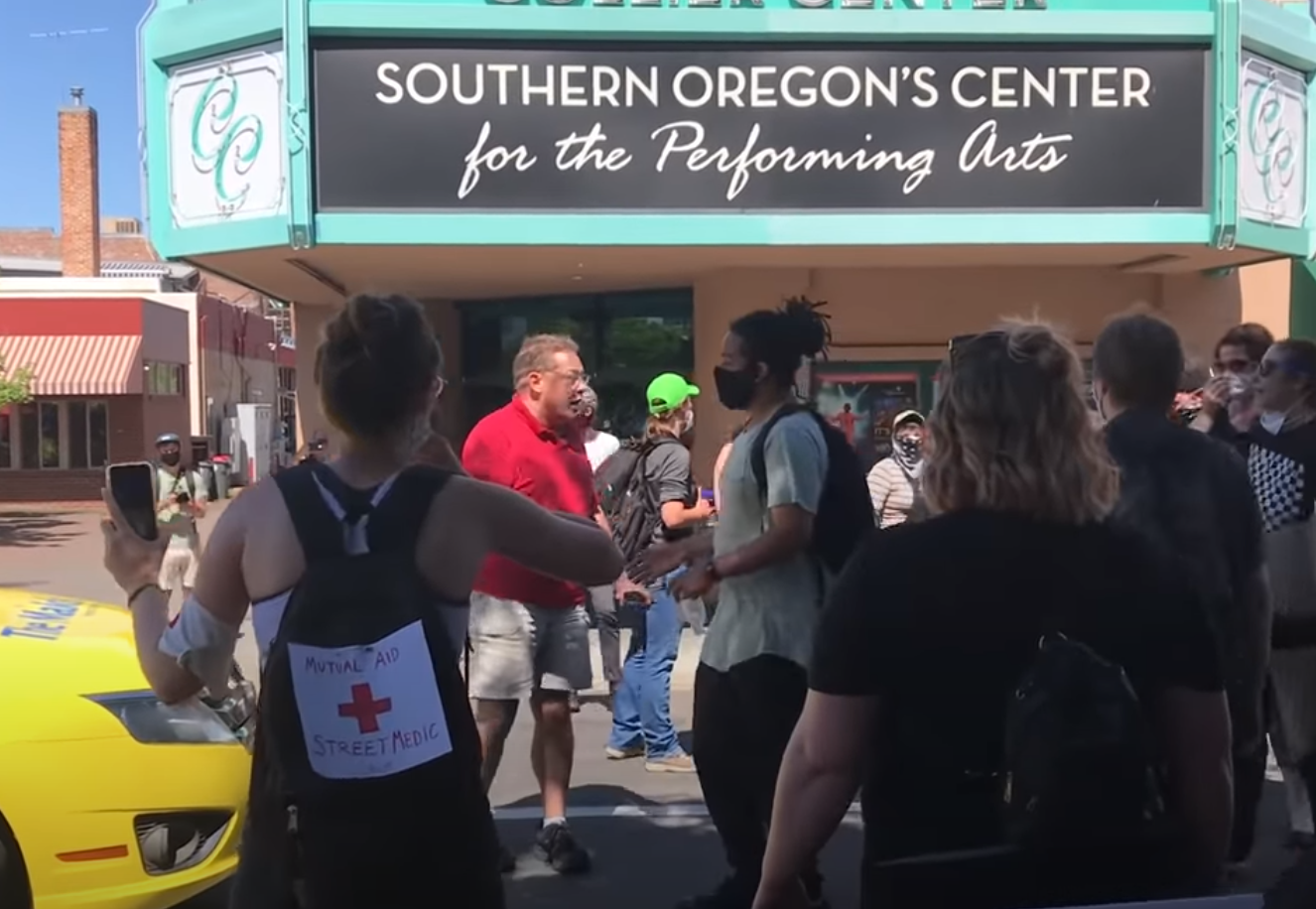
Phoenix mayor arguing in Medford gathering

More than 1,000 protesters marched through the streets of Medford, on June 1, with some demonstrators lying in the street for nine minutes to honor George Floyd. Phoenix, Oregon's Mayor Chris Luz drove his yellow maid-cleaning service vehicle close to protesters, then got into a heated confrontation with protesters and a legal observer. A protester brought it up in a Phoenix commissioners meeting on June 15, and city councilor Sarah Westover said "I can’t believe the actions that you took, nudging teenagers with your car, intimidating, and threatening them for expressing their opinions. I think this is unacceptable behavior, and I want to call on the mayor to resign tonight." Another councilor asked Luz to apologize, he didn't reply. The Medford police opened in investigation into the mayor's actions. Armed militia members were standing outside the commissioners meeting.

=== Monmouth ===
A group of at least 60 protesters at the intersection of Pacific Ave. and Main St. in downtown Monmouth, rallied and chanted in support of the Black Lives Matter movement.

=== Newberg ===
On June 4, hundreds of protesters gathered at the Chehalem Cultural Center and marched down Hancock Street to support Black Lives Matter.

=== Newport ===
Hundreds gathered in front of Newport City Hall to protest in support of Black Lives Matter at noon on June 3. The group marched to the Lincoln County Courthouse and back to Newport City Hall.

=== Ontario ===
Hundreds marched in the eastern border city of Ontario, an exurb of Boise, Idaho, on June 4. Mayor Riley Hill expressed a desire to listen to the protesters, and to make Ontario a city that "unites instead of divides." Police chief Steven Romero praised the protesters for their peaceful disposition despite taunts from individuals along the march.

=== Pendleton ===
Approximately 150 people protested at Roy Raley Park chanting "No justice, no peace" on June 1.

About 200 people demonstrated on August 29, organized by Briana Spencer, John Landreth, and Nolan Bylenga. The Pendleton police worked with the organizers to develop a safety plan for the march, which attracted counter-protesters.

=== Portland ===
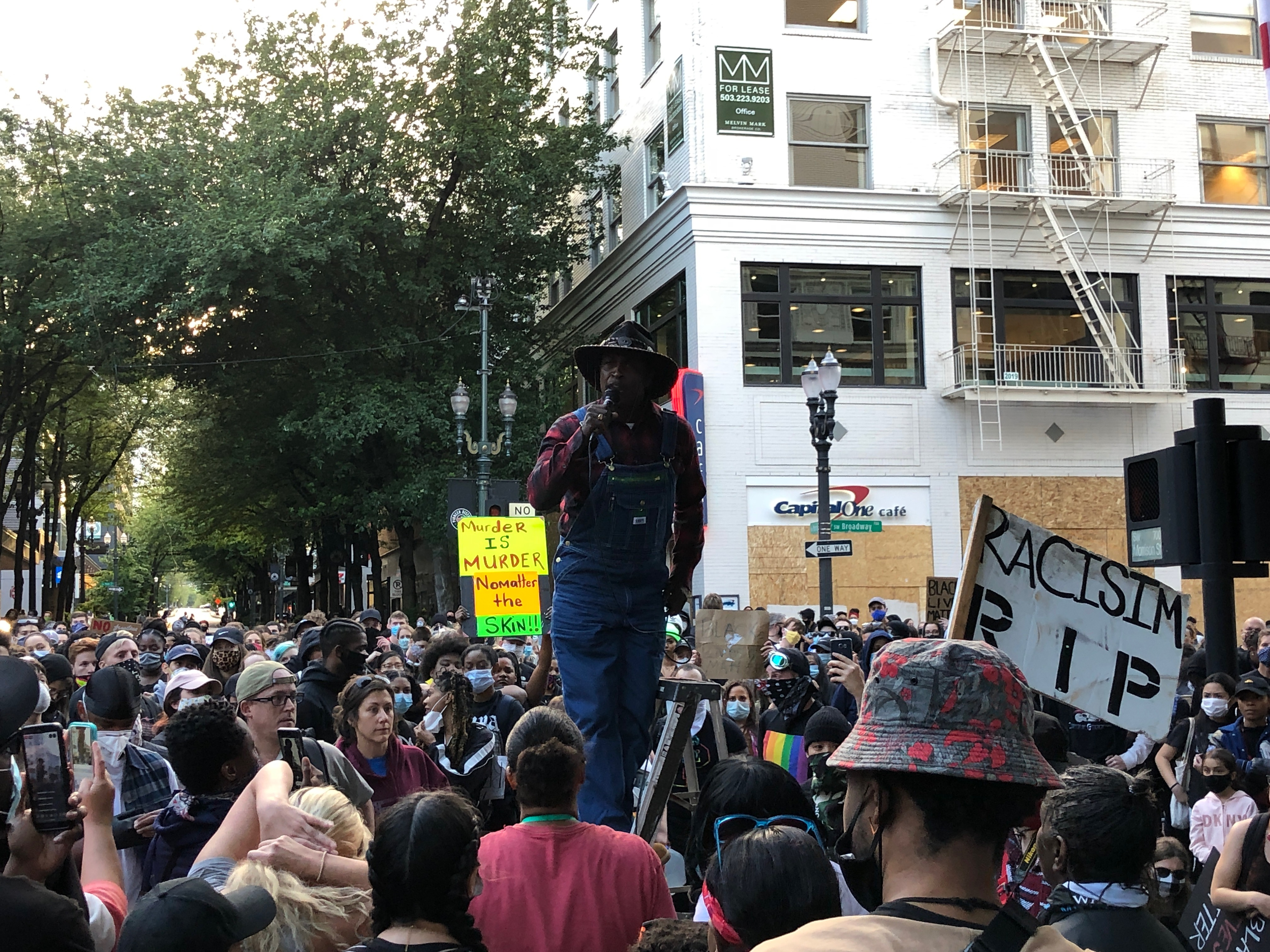
A rally in Portland on June 2

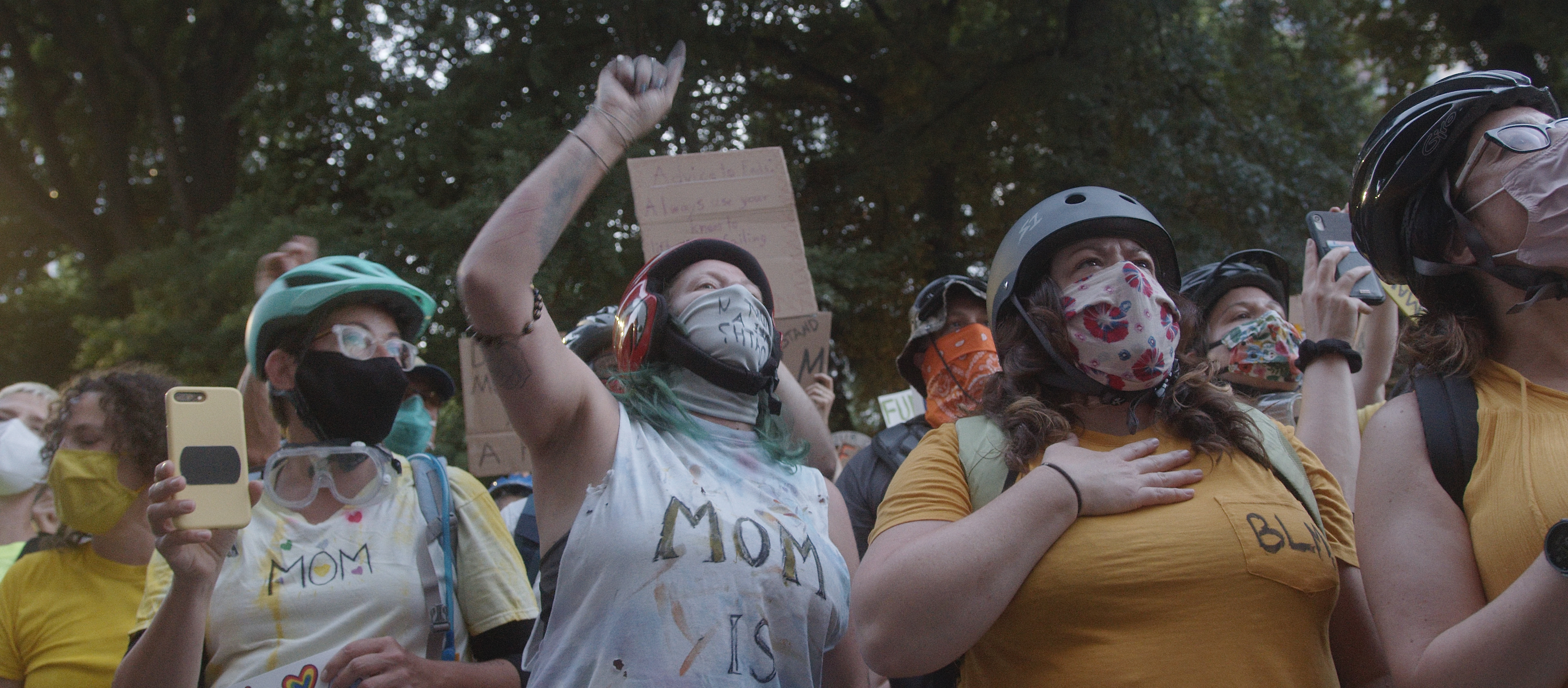
The Wall of Moms, later the Moms United for Black Lives Matter, in Portland on July 24

=== Prineville ===
Around 150 Black Lives Matter protesters came out on May 31 in front of the Crook County Courthouse, along with a similar number of counterprotesters. The Black leader of the protest discussed being bullied during high school in Prineville. She met with police chief Dale Cummins, who then posted a video on the department's official Facebook page, stating "quite frankly completely lied about the conversation". She received threatening messages; after asking the police to investigate one, a police captain said he'd spoken to the person who threatened her but didn't pursue it further. When asked by OPB about the Black Lives Matter movement, Cummins responded similarly to the All Lives Matter viewpoint.

Dozens demonstrated on Saturday June 13, and there were four arrests.

A recent rally had counterprotesters with a Confederate flag, thin blue line American flag, Trump 2020 flags, a t-shirt calling the Black organizer a liar. "More than a dozen members" of the Three Percenters supported the counterprotest with assault rifles and plastic handcuffs.

=== Salem ===
More than 200 demonstrators marched around the Oregon State Capitol Building on May 30. A police spokesman claimed the reason they used tear gas to break up the protest is because hard objects and "explosive devices" were thrown. The mayor issued an indefinite nightly curfew because "there was no reason to take a chance on a few "misguided individuals" destroying public and private property." Protests continued through the week, with a protest on Saturday June 6 drawing thousands to the streets in downtown.

Several hundred protesters rallied at the capitol on the afternoon of June 13.

Black Lives Matter protesters clashed with right-wing protesters during a pro-Trump caravan event at the state capitol on September 7.

=== Seaside ===
On June 2, more than 1,000 people gathered at Seaside City Hall and marched through the city to protest the murder of George Floyd.

=== Springfield ===
Dozens of protesters gathered at Springfield City Hall on June 8 as City Council considered, and decided against, cutting its expensive police body camera program.

=== St. Helens ===
Hundreds of people marched through town protesting racism on June 3. They held signs that said "Black Lives Matter" in a community where very few black people live.

=== Tualatin ===
Hundreds of protesters gathered at Tualatin Lake of the Commons before marching downtown on June 2.
