= Bricks Cascade =

Lego fan convention in Oregon

- Genre: Lego convention
- Frequency: Annual
- Venue: Oregon Convention Center
- Location: Portland, Oregon
- Country: United States
- Years active: 2012-present
- Organiser: Bricklandia Inc.
- Website: brickscascade.com

Bricks Cascade is a Lego fan convention hosted annually in Portland, Oregon. The event is hosted by the nonprofit organization Bricklandia Inc.

== History ==
The first event was held in June 2012 after the retirement of BrickFest three years earlier. The 2023 event hosted over 1,400 creations. The convention has over 60,000 square feet of dedicated space.
