= Black Lives Matter street mural (Portland, Oregon) =

2020 street mural in Portland, Oregon, US

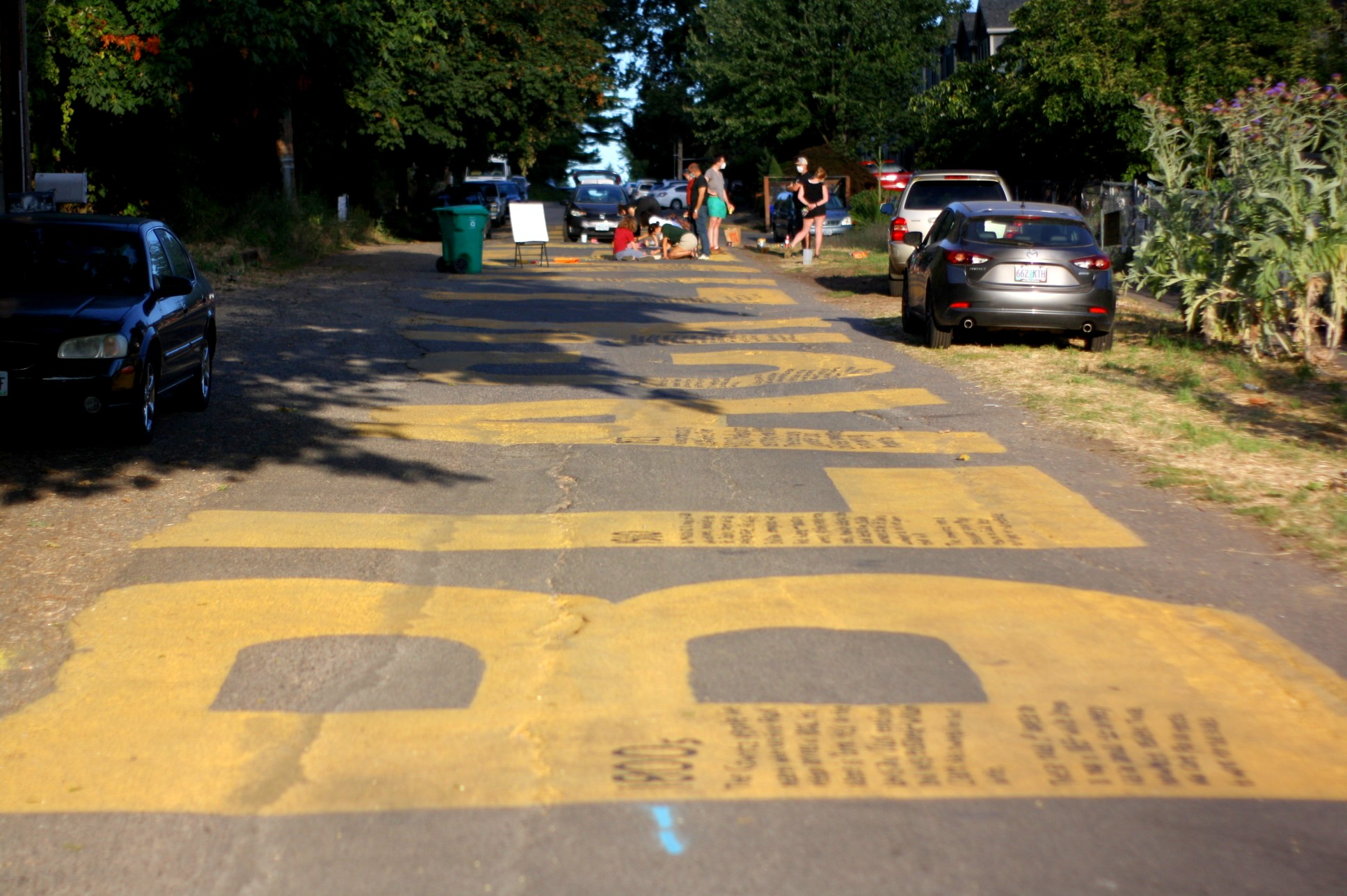
- The "Black Lives Matter" mural in St. Johns (July 23, 2020)
- Location: Portland, Oregon, United States; 45°35′11.2″N 122°45′18.9″W
- Website: edisonstreetmural.com

On June 18, 2020, Nick Lloyd painted the phrase "Black Lives Matter" in large bright yellow block letters on North Edison Street in Portland, Oregon's St. Johns neighborhood.

== Description and history ==
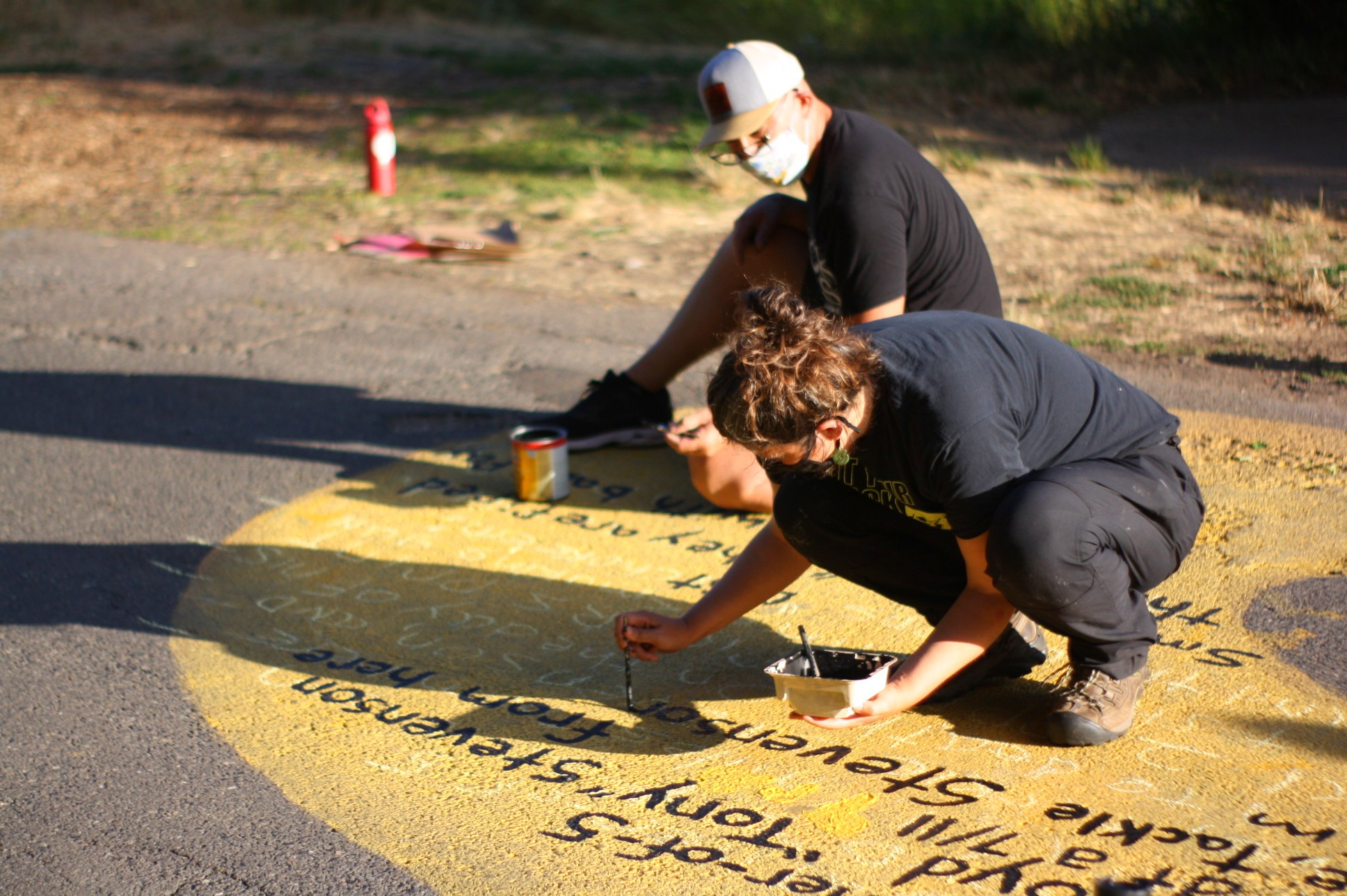
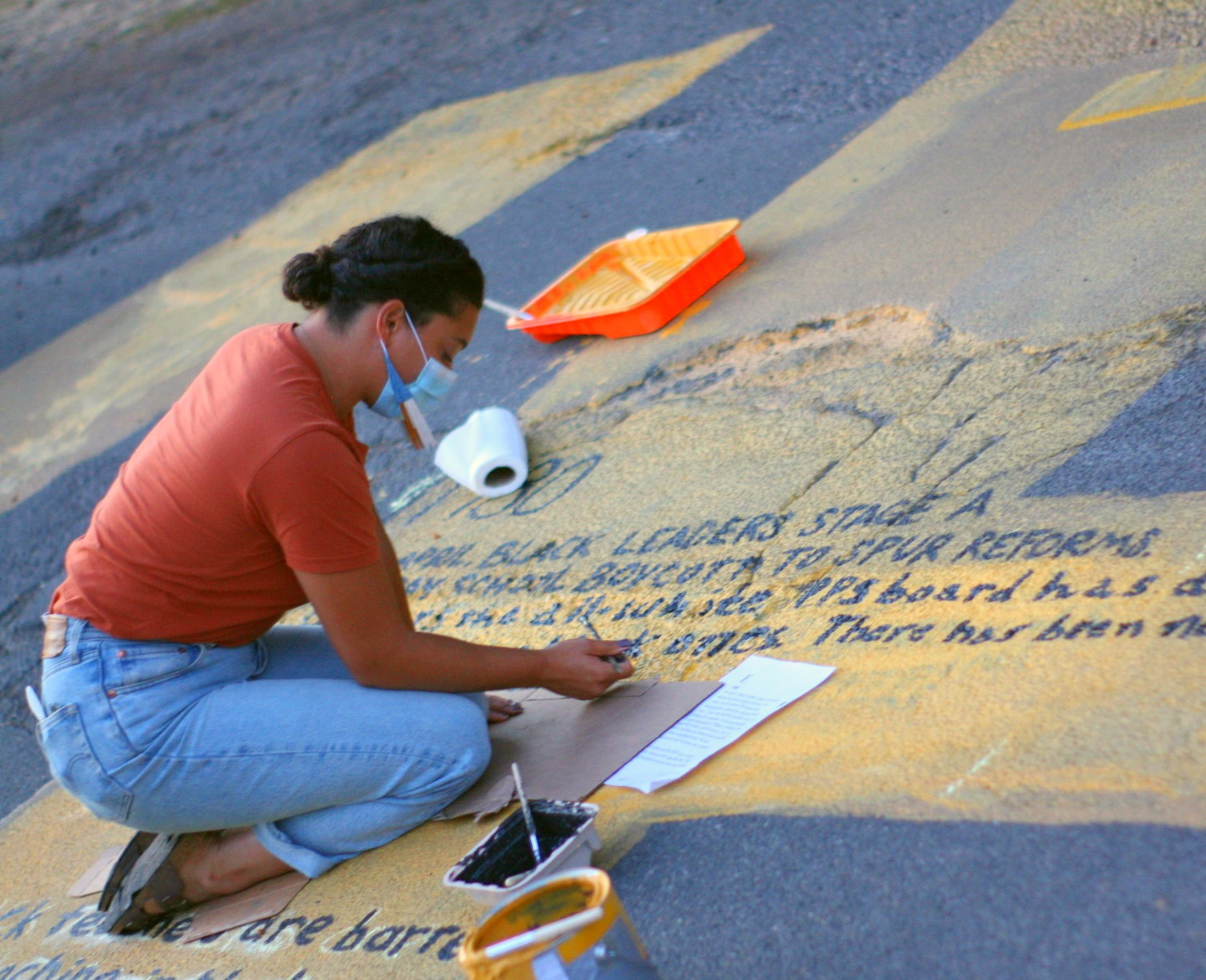
People writing text within the mural's yellow block letters

Inspired by Washington, D.C.'s Black Lives Matter Plaza, the 336-foot (102 m) mural spanned an entire block, and had "detailed historic facts about the treatment of minorities in Portland" written in smaller text within individual letters. The following text appeared within the letter "B":

1800 – The Cowlitz people live nearby when the first Black visitor arrives in 1802. His name is York. He's on the Lewis and Clark expedition, and he's enslaved – William Clark has owned him since birth. These roads 1st appear on a map in 1865 – While Oregon has an annual tax on every nonwhite resident. Those who can't pay are forced to work for the state.

Written on the letter "A" was "1923 — This neighborhood is 100% White. Over 9,000 belong to the KKK. The state bans Japanese and Chinese immigrants from owning property". A statement about when voters changed the Constitution of Oregon to eliminate the original ban on Black residents (2001) was written on one of the "T" letters, and another letter displayed the text "In 1988, PDX banks make only 9 mortgage loans in the district from Irvington to Woodlawn."

Lloyd did not seek permission to paint the mural, and city officials did not plan to remove the artwork, as of June 25. He said of his work:

We are all a part of history you can find your birth date somewhere between these letters and see that the story continues... I think we all make history, whether we mean to or not. All of us are part of the story of the rest of us. By relating the events of this area and this region to this very bit of ground, it highlights how much each of us has a choice in what we be a part of. We are all a part of a longer story. It started before us, it will continue after us and we only can control the portion that's in front of us.

The mural was vandalized in July 2020.

== See also ==
- 2020 in art
- Culture of Portland, Oregon
