= Glenn Anthony May =

American historian (1945–2020)

Glenn Anthony May (June 12, 1945 – September 8, 2020) was a professor of history at the University of Oregon, where he worked from 1983 to 2015. His area of study included Southeast Asian history (especially of the Philippines), foreign relations of the United States, and Chicano history.

== Biography ==
May was born in Brooklyn in 1945. May studied at Yale University for his undergraduate degree. After graduating in 1966, he served in the Vietnam War. When his military service was complete, he returned to Yale where he received a PhD in history. He married Helen Liu in 1991 and they have two children.

May's main research focus has been on the History of the Philippines. His works include:

- Social Engineering in the Philippines: The Aims, Execution, and Impact of American Colonial Policy, 1900–1913 (Greenwood Press, 1980, ISBN 9780313209789)
- A Past Recovered: Essays on Philippine History and Historiography (New Day, 1987, ISBN 9789711002602)
- Battle for Batangas: A Philippine Province at War (Yale University Press, 1991, ISBN 9780300048506)
- Inventing a Hero: The Posthumous Re-Creation of Andres Bonifacio (University of Wisconsin, Center for Southeast Asian Studies, 1996, ISBN 9789711009151)
- Sonny Montes and Mexican American Activism in Oregon (2010).

May's work has been influential. His 1980 book, based on his PhD work, was published at a time when US control of the Philippines was generally thought to have led to rather positive results, was much more skeptical of the benefits of American rule. May's 1996 work on the historiography of Andrés Bonifacio attracted controversy, Inventing a Hero: The Posthumous Re-Creation of Andres Bonifacio. In it, May argued that much of the commonly accepted knowledge of Bonifacio were based on unverifiable or forged documents, and was a myth disconnected from the real Bonifacio. As Bonifacio is a Philippine national icon, this attracted pushback from those who wished to defend the standard version of Bonifacio's story. May also criticized the work of historian John Leddy Phelan on the Philippines under Spanish rule in 2004, in particular his claim that the Spanish began a process of changing communally held property into private property. Rather, May said, old Spanish documents indicate that the disputes of the era involved disputes with existing landholders – while the Spanish did take land, it appears it was from pre-existing owners in the Filipino elite, not from a commons.

May died on September 8, 2020. His ashes are interred at the Eugene Pioneer Cemetery in Eugene, Oregon near the University of Oregon.
