= Jim Bartko =

American college athletics administrator (1965–2020)

Biographical details
- Born: May 13, 1965; Stockton, California
- Died: March 16, 2020 (aged 54); Eugene, Oregon
- Education: Washington State University

Administrative career (AD unless noted)
- 1994–2003: Oregon (asst. AD)
- 2003–2006: Oregon (assoc. AD)
- 2006–2007: California (assoc. AD)
- 2007–2014: Oregon (assoc. AD)
- 2015–2017: Fresno State

James Andrew Bartko (May 13, 1965 – March 16, 2020) was an American college athletics administrator who spent most of his professional life at the University of Oregon, as well as some years at Washington State and UC Berkeley and as athletic director at California State University, Fresno (Fresno State).

== Career ==
Jim Bartko began his career while still a student at Washington State University (Pullman) as team manager of Washington State Cougars football. His first professional job started in 1989 at the University of Oregon as regional director and fundraiser for the Duck Athletic Fund. From 1994 to 1998, he was assistant athletic director at Oregon for the Duck Athletic Fund, and then became assistant athletic director for community and corporate relations at Oregon from 1998 to 2003. From 2003 to 2006, he served as Oregon's associate athletic director for donor relations.

In 2006, Bartko returned to the Bay area of his youth to be senior associate athletic director for development at UC Berkeley.

But in 2007, Bartko came back to his true home at the University of Oregon where he flourished for seven years as senior associate athletic director. Among other major projects, given his close collaboration for nearly 30 years with Phil Knight, he oversaw the building of the Matthew Knight Arena in 2011 to be home court for the UO's basketball teams. Across sports through those years, according to UO football coach Rich Brooks, "he was probably as responsible as anyone in the athletic department’s transition from having nothing to having everything you could ever need. He was in the middle of everything.” "He had an outgoing personality that connected with everybody, was very helpful to boosters, and did a great job with communication between everybody on the athletics side and on the university side."

In November 2014, Fresno State hired Bartko as athletic director, a position he assumed on January 1, 2015. During his tenure there, he notably hired Jeff Tedford, who became the football coach that turned around the Bulldogs from losing to winning seasons in two years. Bartko's Fresno years ended in November 2017 in the wake of fallout from his going public in January 2017 about a lifelong secret of child sex abuse at the hands of his basketball-coaching priest, which he'd been struggling with for decades until his coping mechanisms, having taken an enormous toll, finally collapsed, metaphorically, during his years at Fresno.

Bartko left Fresno in 2018, filing a lawsuit against Fresno State for wrongful termination, and once again returned to Eugene and the University of Oregon as associate director of development, later promoted to senior ambassador for advancement and alumni relations.

== Personal life ==
Born in Stockton, California, Bartko spent his elementary school years in the Bay Area community of Pinole and secondary school years in Modesto. He graduated from Central Catholic High School in Modesto and then from Washington State University, where he majored in sports administration with a minor in business administration.

While growing up in Pinole, from ages 7 to 10, he became one of the altar boys abused early on by the serial predator priest Stephen Kiesle, a secret that he kept for nearly 50 years but finally revealed in 2017 and recounted in his book Boy in the Mirror published in February 2020.

On March 16, 2020, Jim Bartko died from complications of surgery after collapsing following a gym workout on March 15, three days after his press conference announcing the release of his book in conjunction with a lawsuit he joined against the Roman Catholic Diocese of Oakland. He had partnered with Oregon's Center for the Prevention of Abuse and Neglect to establish the Jimmy Bartko Child Abuse & Scholarship Fund, to which all proceeds from his book will go. The fund will support students at the UO's College of Education who seek to work with survivors of child sexual abuse, the cause to which he had just begun to dedicate the rest of his working life.

He was recently divorced; he leaves a son and daughter as well as his parents and sister.
