= 2022 in Oregon =

- Decades: 2000s; 2010s; 2020s
- See also: History of Oregon; Historical outline of Oregon; List of years in Oregon; 2022 in the United States

The year 2022 in Oregon involved several major events.

== Politics and government ==
=== Incumbents ===
- Governor: Kate Brown (D)
- Secretary of State: Shemia Fagan (D)

=== Elections ===
- 2022 Oregon elections primaries on May 17; general election November 8

== Events ==
=== January ===
- January 28 –Greek restaurant Bluto's opens in Portland.

=== February ===
- February 1–March 4 – 81st Oregon Legislative Assembly short session
- February 19 – Normandale Park shooting

=== March ===
- March 12 – COVID-19 pandemic: Oregon lifts indoor mask mandates in most places.
- March 20 – The Roxy, a restaurant in Portland, closes.

=== April ===
- April 3 – Champagne Poetry Patisserie opens in Portland.
- April 21 – President Joe Biden visits Portland for the first time since taking office. He gives a speech at the Portland Air National Guard Base and attends a fundraiser with the Portland Yacht Club.

=== May ===
- May 31 – Dinolandia, an art project and museum, opens in Portland.

=== June ===
- June 2 – Murder of Daniel Brophy
- June 4
  - 2022 Pacific Office Automation 147
  - 2022 Portland 112
- June 8–11 – 2022 NCAA Division I Outdoor Track and Field Championships
- June 22 – The Dolly Olive opens in Portland.
- June 23–26 – 2022 USA Outdoor Track and Field Championships
- June 29 – Bar Cala opens in Portland.

=== July ===
- 2022 Oregon wildfires start.
- July 1 – Lesbian/LGBTQ-friendly bar Doc Marie's opens for a single day, shutting down the next day due to manager resignations and employee grievances.
- July 15–24 – 2022 World Athletics Championships
- July 31 – The Blumenauer Bridge for bicyclists and pedestrians opens in Portland.

=== August ===
- August 1–November 2 – Cedar Creek Fire
- August 13 – Doc Marie's reopens.
- August 21 – An experimental plane crashes near Scio, resulting on the death of the pilot and injury of the passenger.
- August 28 – A shooting in Bend, Oregon results in two people wounded and three deaths, including the shooter.

=== September ===
- September 4 – 2022 Grand Prix of Portland
- September 19 – Amid ongoing wildfires, public officials tell Eugene and Springfield residents to stay indoors due to poor air quality.

=== October ===
- October 1 – The Oregon City Bridge is closed for celebrations of its 100th year anniversary. Delegations from the Confederated Tribes of the Grand Ronde, Confederated Tribes of Warm Springs, and the Yakama Nation are in attendance, participating in a welcome ceremony and exchange of gifts.
- October 13 – The Grant County sheriff arrests a U.S. Forest Service worker after a controlled burn at Malheur National Forest spreads and burns 20 acres of private farmland.
- October 15 – President Biden visits Portland, speaking to a small crowd in the East Portland Community Center.
- October 18 – Oregon Supreme Court Chief Justice Martha Walters announces that she will retire in December.
- October 23 – About 200 protesters and counter-protesters, some with firearms, face off outside a Drag Queen Story Hour at a pub in Eugene.
- October 25 – The State of Oregon announces that SNAP recipients will receive extra emergency food benefits through the end of the year.

=== November ===
- November 20 – Grass Valley is temporarily evacuated after a fire breaks out at a hemp manufacturing facility.

=== December ===
- December 14 – A 4.9 magnitude earthquake strikes off the Oregon Coast.
- December 19 – After months of antibiotics fail to treat her chronic ear infections, doctors at Oregon State University's veterinary hospital perform the first-ever total ear canal removal surgery on a pig. The pig that underwent the operation was a Vietnamese potbelly pig named Ella.
- December 23 – A winter storm causes power outages and brings sleet and freezing rain to the Willamette Valley and Columbia River Gorge.
