= The Queen's Head (Portland, Oregon) =

Defunct LGBTQ pub and lounge in Portland, Oregon, U.S.

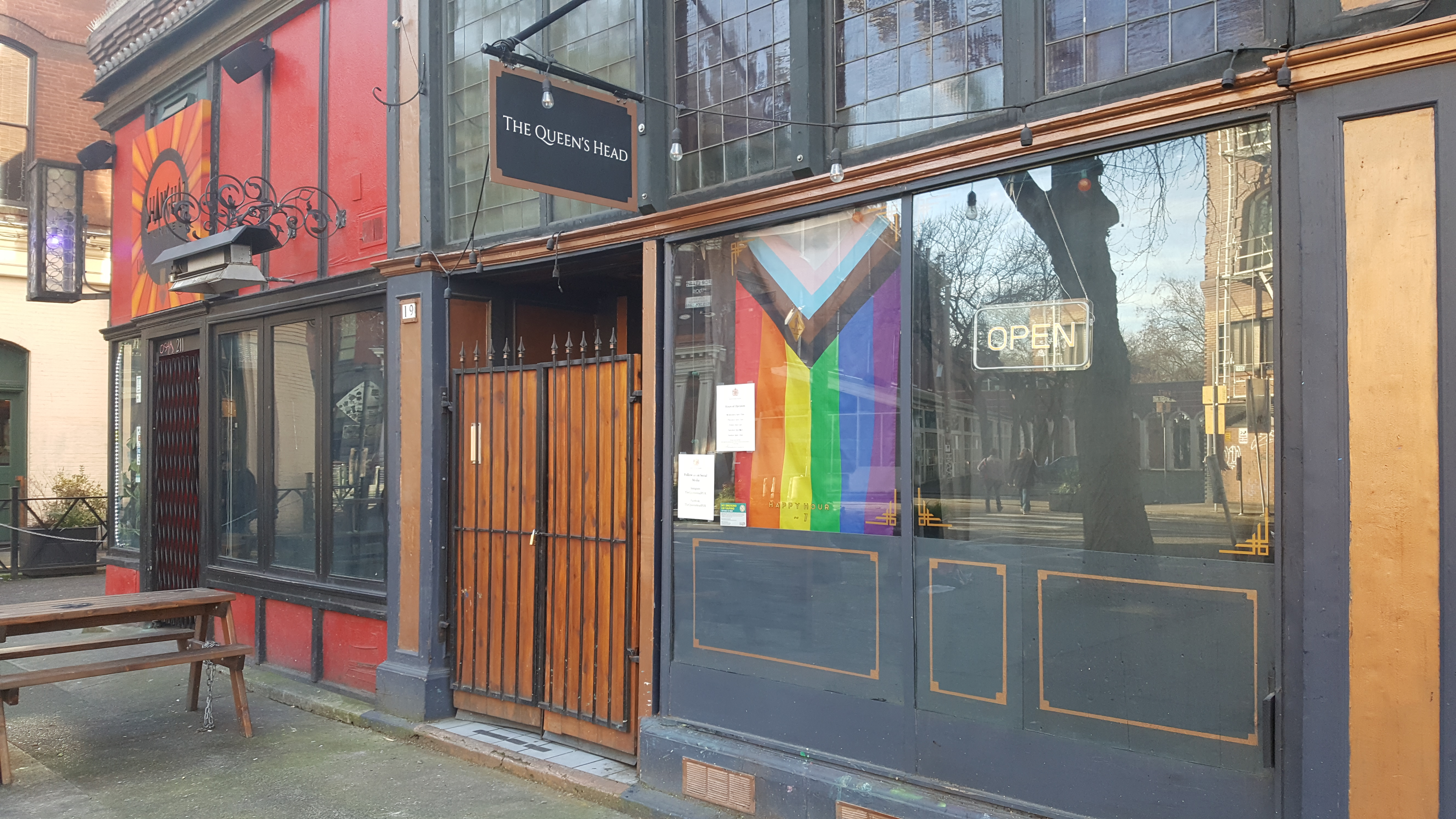
- The pub's entrance on Southwest 2nd Avenue, next to Shanghai Tunnel Bar, in 2022
- Interactive map of The Queen's Head

Restaurant information
- Established: November 2021
- Closed: 2022
- Owner: Daniel Bund
- Chef: Antha Hansen
- Food type: British
- Location: 19 Southwest 2nd Avenue, Portland, Multnomah, Oregon, 97204, United States
- Coordinates: 45.5227°N 122.6726°W

The Queen's Head was an LGBTQ-friendly pub and lounge in Portland, Oregon, United States. Daniel Bund opened the restaurant in late 2021, during the COVID-19 pandemic. Described as an inclusive drag bar and gay club, The Queen's Head hosted burlesque and talent shows, karaoke, poetry slams, trivia competitions, and other events.

The Queen's Head had a British-inspired menu with comfort food and bar snacks such as coronation chicken sandwiches, sausage rolls, Scotch eggs, and shepherd's pie. In July 2022, the cafe was sold to the worker-owned cooperative known as The Queen's Collective, and operated as Pinq before closing in November 2022.

== Description ==
The Queen's Head was an English-style pub and lounge in the Southwest Portland part of Old Town Chinatown. It operated near Ankeny Alley, a pedestrian-friendly zone with clubs and restaurants including Dan and Louis Oyster Bar, Shanghai Tunnel Bar, and Voodoo Doughnut.

Andrew Jankowski of Eater Portland and the Portland Mercury called the business a drag bar and gay club. Conner Reed and Thom Hilton of Eater Portland described The Queen's Head as a queer bar and English pub inspired by the owner's time in London. The owner said the space was inclusive and queer, not specifically gay or lesbian. The business hosted drag shows and burlesque performances regularly; other events included "queer art recess", drag queen piano shows, karaoke, poetry slam, a "queer prom party", storytelling, talent shows, and trivia competitions.

The Queen's Head offered "a shifting menu of bar snacks and comfort food drawn from across the U.K.'s Commonwealth". The menu included: baked Brazilian coxinha dumplings, curry hand pies, coronation chicken sandwiches (roasted chicken with grapes and chutney), cucumber and watercress sandwiches, sausage rolls, Scotch eggs, shepherd's pie, and charcuterie boards with chicken and lamb skewers, roasted mushrooms, and cheeses served on tiered high tea trays. Supper club specials included marinated pulled pork or oysters, with sautéed mushrooms and marinated shredded vegetables and vegan substitutes. The Calamity Jane was among the bar's "signature" cocktails. According to Reed and Hilton, The Queen's Head offered the city's "most extensive" menu of non-alcoholic cocktails, which used ingredients such as peach turmeric tea and rose five-spice simple syrup.

== History ==
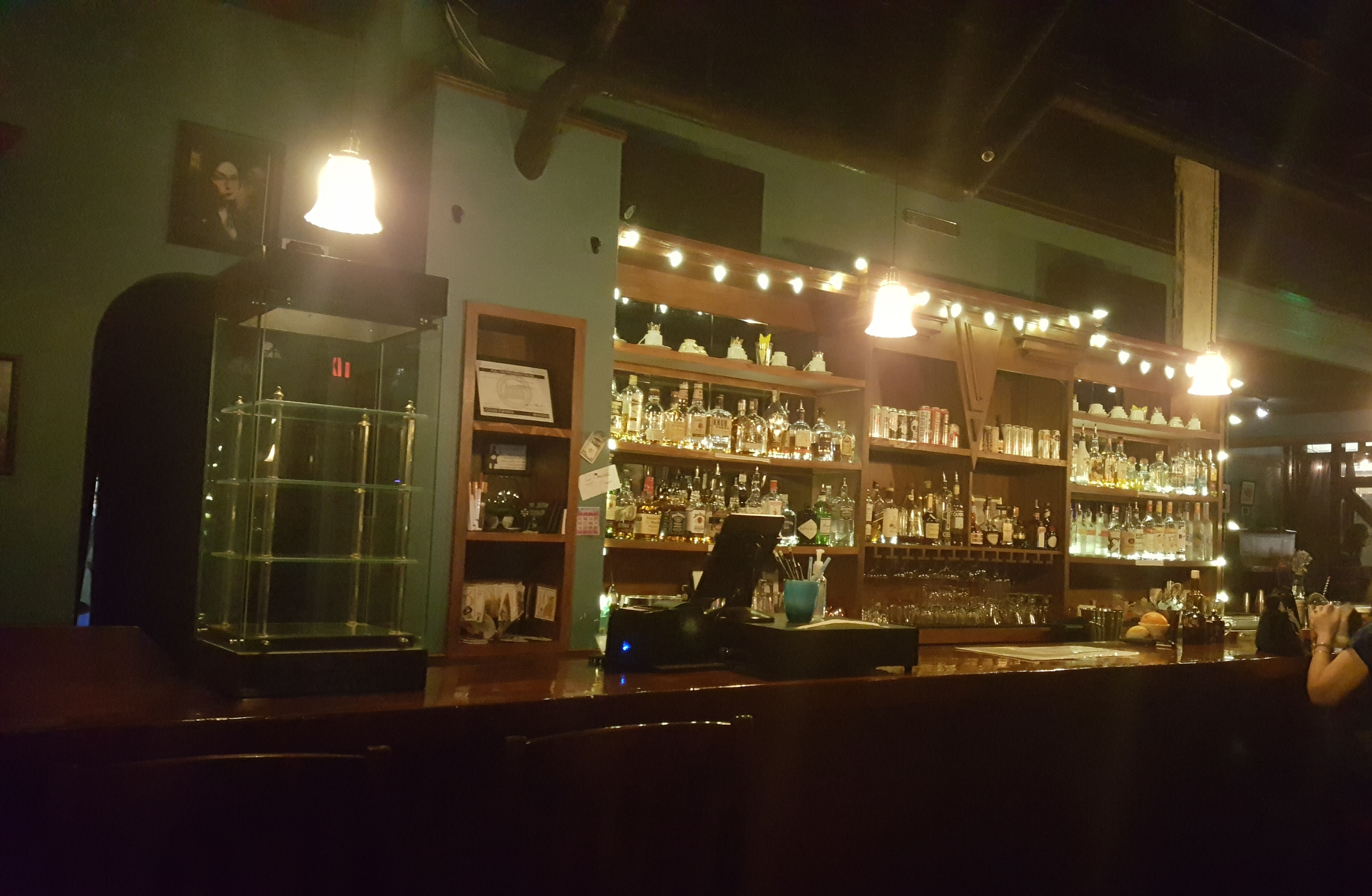
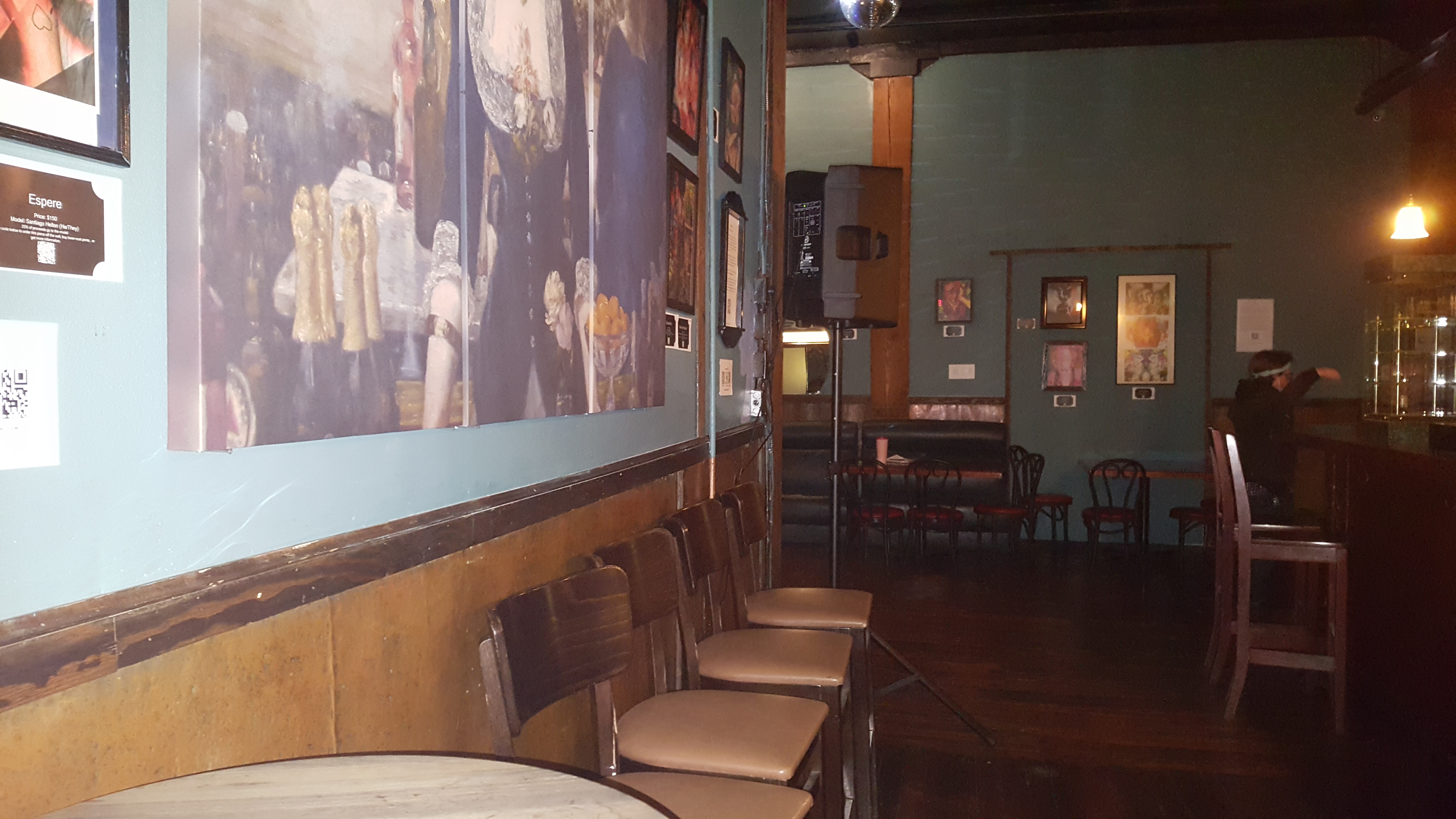
The bar's interior in 2022

Owner Daniel Bund opened The Queen's Head in November 2021, during the COVID-19 pandemic. The business occupied the space which previously housed Berbati's Pan and Tryst. Bund saw the launch as an "overt return of the LGBTQ+ community to Ankeny Alley". Originally from Portland, he performed in drag on the East Coast and in the United Kingdom for two decades. Bund prefers theatrical drag performance, but generally let producers select the talent showcased at The Queen's Head.

Antha Hansen served as chef in 2021. The bar's first art exhibition, called Vulgaris (Latin for "common"), was held in February 2022. The event featured 40 works by Asa Metrik which "[explored] the sexuality and divinity of the self, and [were] made from portraits submitted by a nonbinary model". Sales benefitted the Center, described as a "queer charity".

In March 2022, Bund sought funding to improve the bar, kitchen equipment, and outdoor seating. In conjunction with Pride celebrations, The Queen's Head hosted events called "The QT (Queer Talent) Show", "(W)horror Show", and "High Tea with the Queens: A Royal Invasion" in June 2022. In mid-2022, Eater Portland's Brooke Jackson-Glidden said The Queen's Head's "blend of drag shows and British pub fare is unique in the city".

=== Transition to Pinq and closure ===
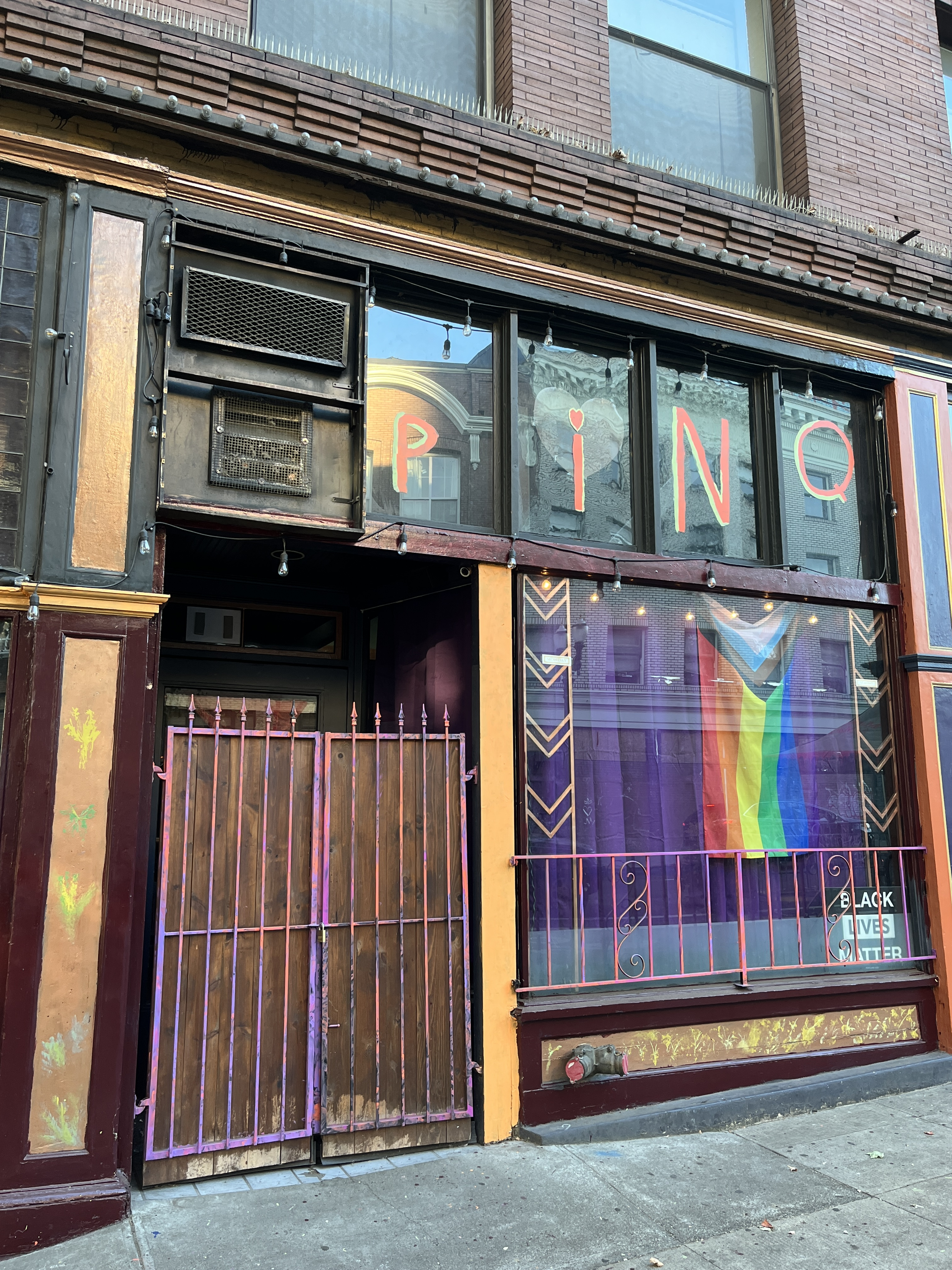
Exterior of Pinq, September 2022

The Queen's Head closed in July 2022, and a worker-owned cooperative known as The Queen's Collective took over operations. The cooperative completed a rebrand, debuting the space as a queer cafe called Pinq (sometimes stylized as P¡nq) in September. Pinq also took over the lease and ran a 501(c)(3) called Cqnnectiqn, which raised funds to help achieve Pinq's goals of "provocative artistic expression, rad economics, anti-oppression organizing and Queer culture keeping". According to Jankowski, the cooperative opposed gentrification, oppression, and racism, and Pinq intended to fill a void left by The Roxy, an LGBT-friendly diner which operated during 1994–2022. The collective once had fifteen employees, but dwindled to three by the time Pinq opened. Staff included a general manager and a public relations and social media manager.

The Queen's Collective worked with approximately 50 drag artists and event producers, and Pinq hosted "burlesque shows, open mics, makers markets, viewing parties for shows like The Boulet Brothers' Dragula, and even bake sales". Pinq sought to book trans and non-binary performers of color. The restaurant began serving Southern-style soul food such as chicken sandwiches, okra étouffée, and oxtails. Pinq acquired The Roxy's espresso machine. The business suffered a series of hardships, including a delayed opening, a refrigerator failure, a break-in, and event cancellations, before closing in November 2022. A post on Pinq's social media account said, "[People] didn't fuck with the vision, and those who did were too economically maligned to save us. Just regular failure under capitalism."
