= 2022 Nevada wildfires =

Natural disasters in the USA

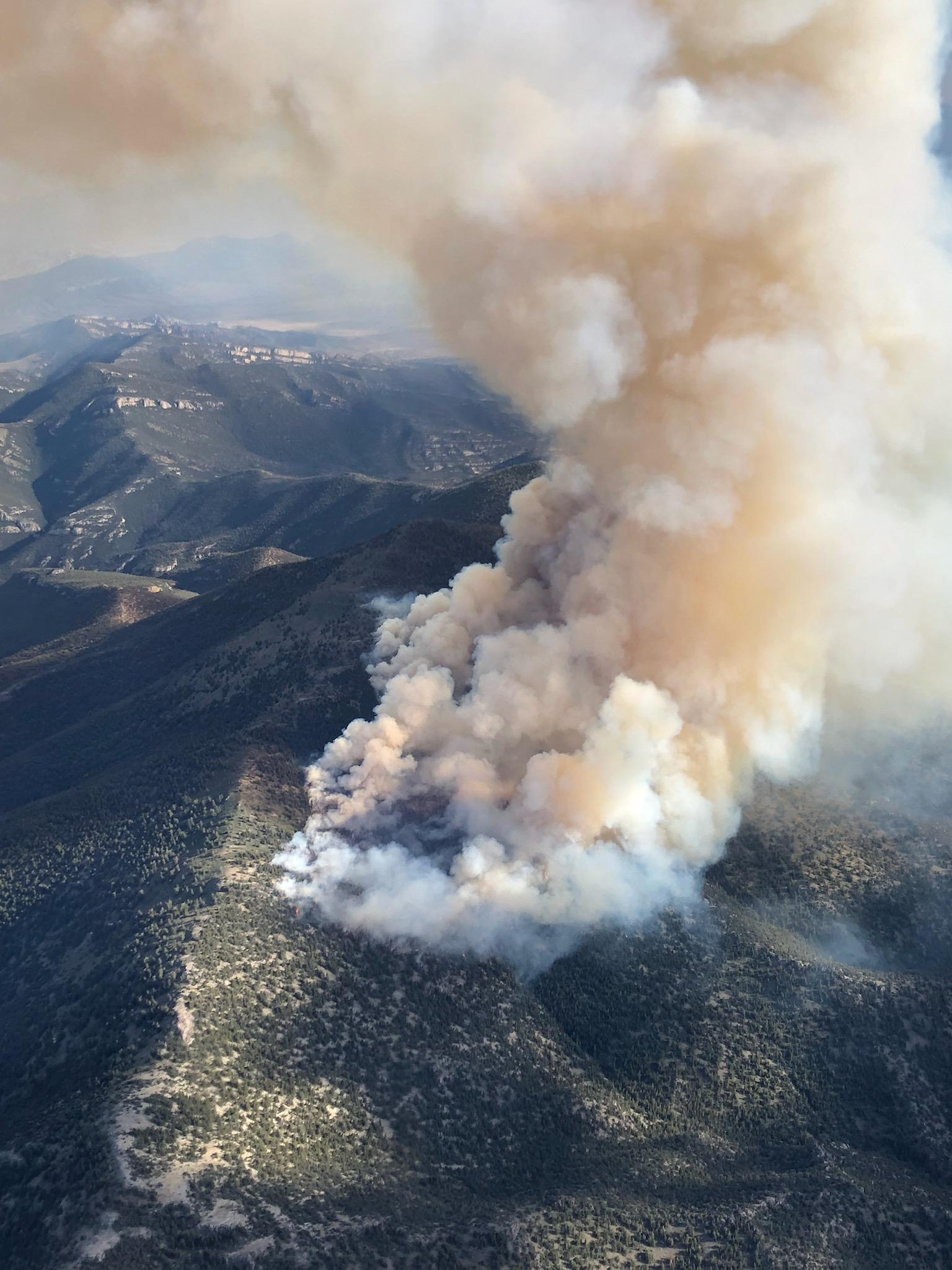
- The Goshute Fire on June 27

Statistics
- Total fires: 504
- Total area: 58,405 acres (23,636 ha; 236.36 km^{2})

A series of wildfires burned throughout the U.S. state of Nevada during 2022.

== Background ==
The typical fire season in Nevada lasts from May to October, the time when vegetation is the driest. However, the timing varies every year based on a number of other factors, including if there is hot, dry weather, the amount of dry vegetation, and when there are more natural causes possible, such as lightning. The peak time of the season is also determined by these factors. Historically, wildfire severity has increased due to large amounts of dry fuel, and acreage typically increases in drought-like and heavy precipitation years.

== Summary ==
Governor Steve Sisolak highlighted in his forecast in May Nevada was in its third consecutive year of drought. Even in late April, every county was under some level of drought. This resulted in the forecast of an exacerbated fire season.

Spring and winter were extremely dry in the Great Basin, which prompted expectations of an early and severe fire season. However, some fuels in Southern Nevada were below average. An extremely early, wet monsoon reduced activity in Southern Nevada in late June. Overall, the monsoon produced between 120% and 200% of the normal rainfall, depending on the region. A large lightning event throughout Eastern Nevada, Western Utah, and Idaho. Conditions in late summer and early fall kept wildfires burning during that time.

== List of wildfires ==
The following is a list of fires that burned more than 1,000 acres (400 ha), or produced significant structural damage or casualties.

Name	County	Acres	Start date	Containment date (Note: Containment means that fire crews have established and secured control lines around the fire's perimeter. These lines are artificial barriers, like trenches or cleared vegetation, designed to stop the fire's spread, or natural barriers like rivers. Containment reflects progress in managing the fire but does not necessarily mean the fire is starved of fuel, under control, or put out.) (Note: If blank, no containment date was recorded)	Notes	Ref
Kinsley	White Pine, Elko	3,209	June 17	June 23	Undetermined cause. Burned 60 miles (97 km) northeast of Ely.	
Goshute	Elko	1,966	June 25		Lightning-caused. Burned 25 miles (40 km) south of West Wendover.	
Becky Peak	White Pine	5,989	July 8	July 18	Human-caused. Burned 50 miles (80 km) north of Ely.	
Wildcat	Elko	21,429	July 13	July 25	Undetermined cause. Burned near Wells.	
Dodge Springs	Lincoln, Washington (UT)	5,644	July 22	July 30	Lightning-caused. Burned 25 miles (40 km) southeast of Caliente.	
Cherry Gulch	Humboldt	15,859	August 26		Undetermined cause. Burned north of the Burning Man festival 8 miles (13 km) south of Denio.	

== See also ==
- 2022 Arizona wildfires
- 2022 California wildfires
- 2022 Oregon wildfires
