= Osborn Hotel =

Historic building in Portland, Oregon, U.S.

- U.S. National Register of Historic Places
- U.S. Historic district – Contributing property
- Portland Historic Landmark
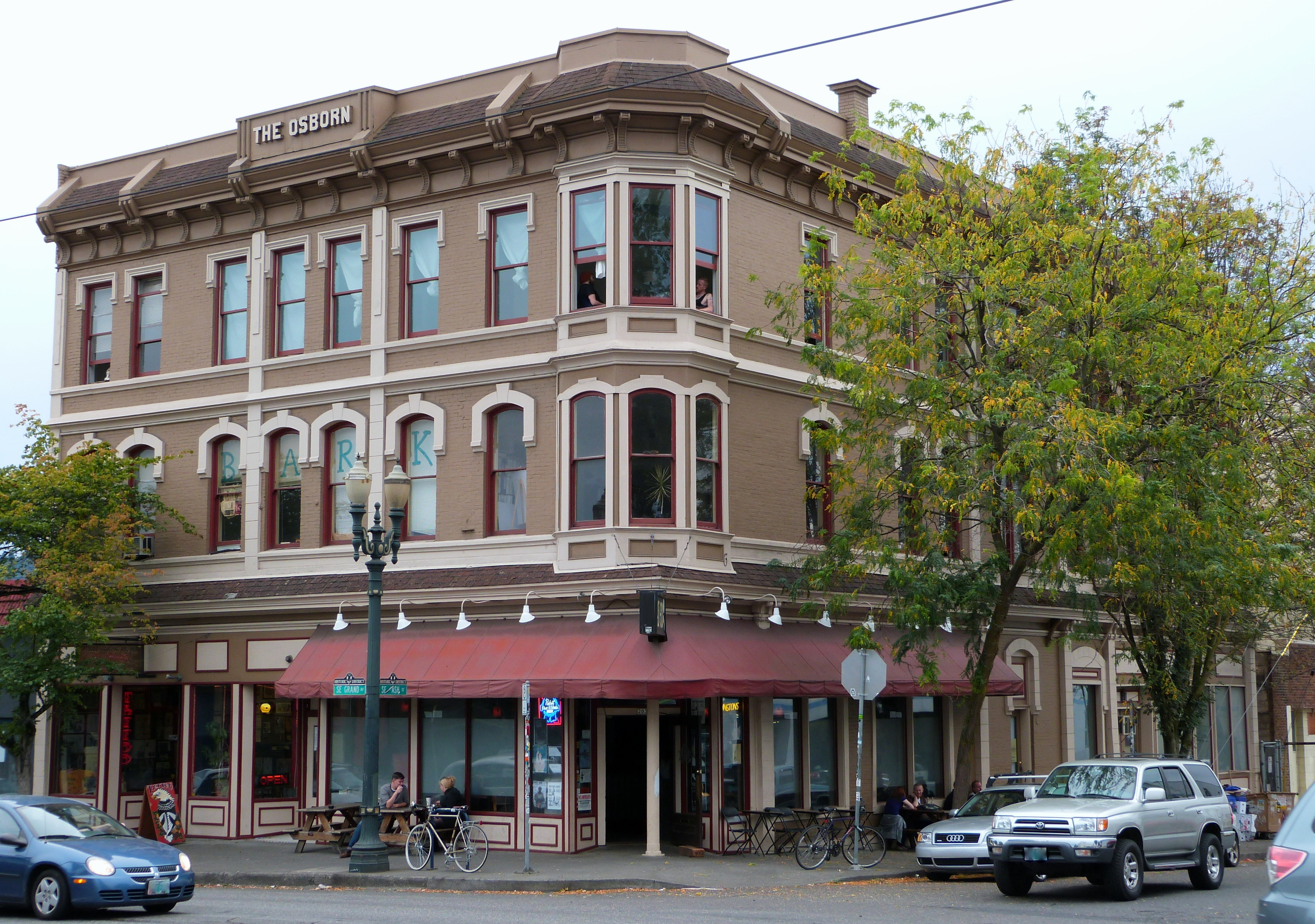
- The Osborn Hotel in 2013

- Location within Portland, Oregon
- Location: 203–207 SE Grand Avenue; Portland, Oregon
- Coordinates: 45°31′17″N 122°39′40″W
- Area: 0.1 acres (0.040 ha)
- Built: 1890
- Architectural style: Second Empire, Italianate
- Part of: East Portland Grand Avenue Historic District (ID91000126)
- NRHP reference No.: 80003373
- Added to NRHP: March 27, 1980

The Osborn Hotel is a building in southeast Portland, Oregon, listed on the National Register of Historic Places.

== History ==
A major fire severely damaged the building on August 8, 2014.

Doc Marie's, a lesbian bar, operated in the building from 2022 to 2025.

== See also ==
- National Register of Historic Places listings in Southeast Portland, Oregon
