= Doc Marie's =

Defunct LGBTQ bar in Portland, Oregon, U.S.

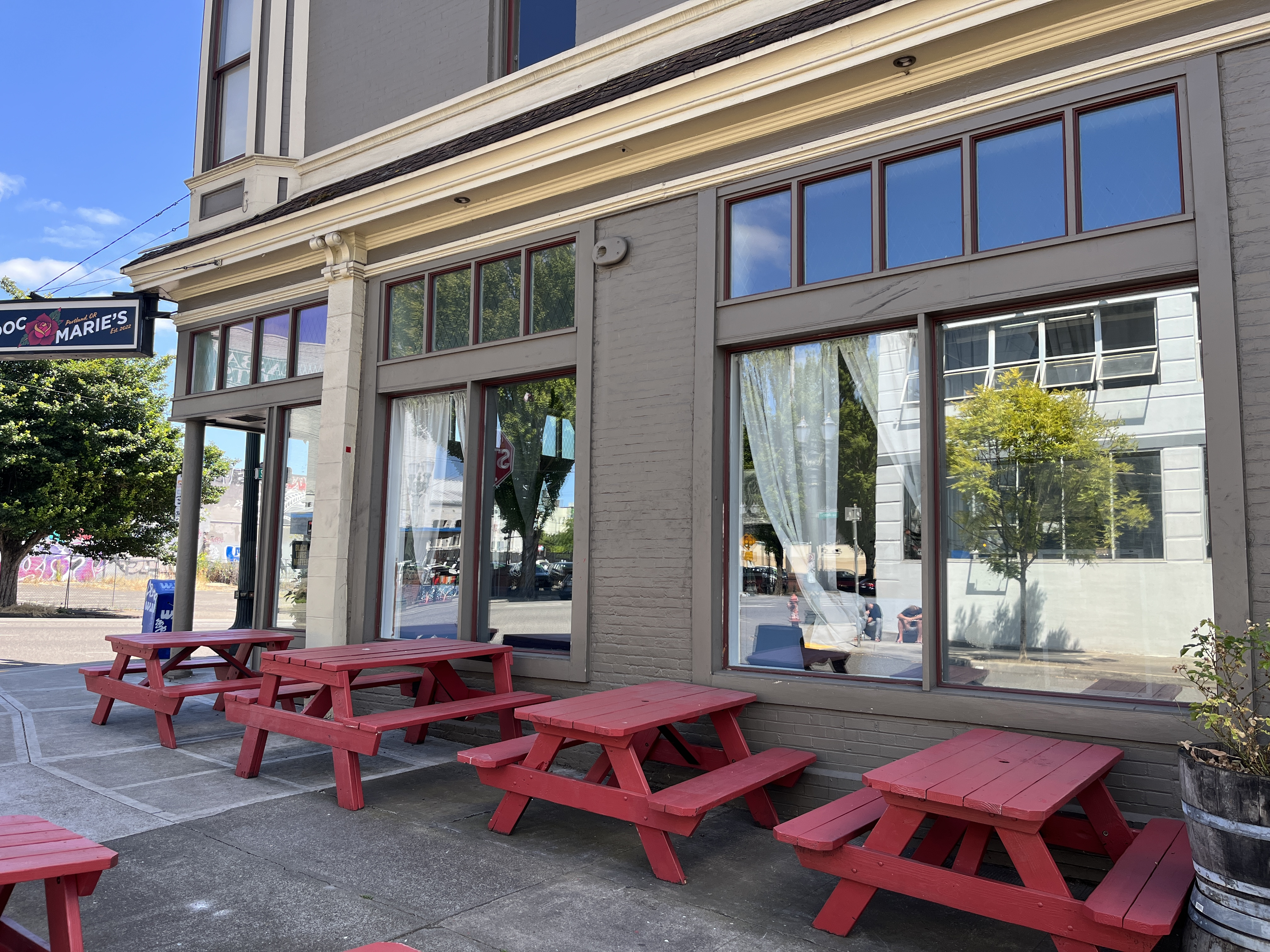
- The bar's exterior, 2022
- Interactive map of Doc Marie's

Restaurant information
- Established: 2022
- Closed: October 31, 2025
- Owners: Olga Bichko; Nikki Ferry
- Location: 203 Southeast Grand Avenue, Portland, Multnomah, Oregon, 97214, United States
- Coordinates: 45.5214°N 122.6610°W
- Website: docmaries.com

Doc Marie's was a lesbian and LGBTQ-friendly bar in Portland, Oregon, United States. Established in 2022, it closed permanently in October 2025.

== Description and history ==
Doc Marie's was a lesbian and LGBTQ-friendly bar in the Osborn Hotel building in southeast Portland's Buckman neighborhood. Owned by Olga Bichko and Nikki Ferry, the business was named after Marie Equi, a lesbian described by Brooke Jackson-Glidden of Eater Portland as "one of Oregon's fiercest champions for labor and women's rights". The business operated as Portland's only lesbian bar, in a space that previously housed Elvis Room.

In March 2022, Eater Portland described plans for the bar to open in May. Doc Marie's began operating on July 1, but closed the following day after two managers resigned and other employees created a worker cooperative. According to Shane Dixon Kavanaugh of The Oregonian, the workers "demanded the bar's owners turn the business over to them, writing on Instagram that they felt 'misled about the space being safe and welcoming.'" The conflict was picked up by Libs of TikTok, a popular conservative Twitter account, resulting in threats directed at the owners and former employees. The bar reopened on August 13, 2022.

Owl was the kitchen manager. The bar closed permanently on October 31 (Halloween), 2025. The business posted on social media, "This has been a devastating year for small businesses and for our community, and we don't have the finances to keep our doors open." The bar Rose City Social Club began operating in the space in 2026.

== Reception ==
Doc Marie's was a finalist in the Best LGBTQIA+ Bar category of Willamette Week's annual 'Best of Portland' readers' poll in 2025. Portland Monthly described the bar's closure as "another blow to the city's already struggling queer bar scene".

== See also ==
- History of lesbianism in the United States
- List of defunct restaurants of the United States
- List of lesbian bars
