= Champagne Poetry Patisserie =

Restaurant in Portland, Oregon, U.S.

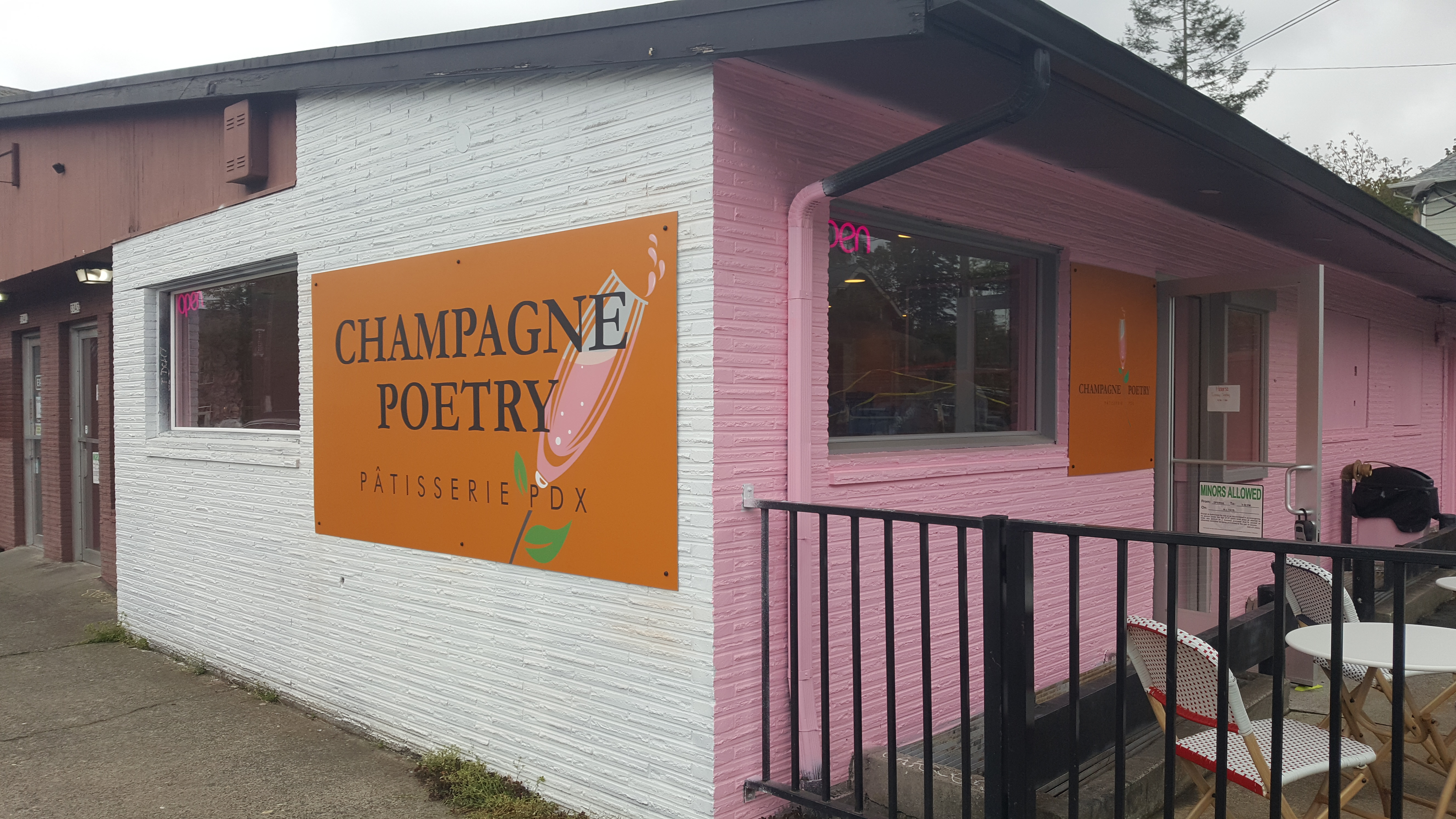
- Exterior of the original restaurant on Hawthorne Boulevard in southeast Portland's Sunnyside neighborhood in 2022
- Interactive map of Champagne Poetry Patisserie

Restaurant information
- Established: April 3, 2022
- Owner: Dan Bian
- Food type: Asian fusion (Asian and French)
- Location: 3343 Southeast Hawthorne Boulevard, Portland, Multnomah, Oregon, 97214, United States
- Coordinates: 45.5122°N 122.6299°W
- Website: champagnepoetry.biz

Champagne Poetry Patisserie is a bakery and restaurant with two locations in Portland, Oregon, United States. The original location opened on Hawthorne Boulevard in southeast Portland's Sunnyside neighborhood in 2022 and a subsequent location opened in the Slabtown district of Northwest Portland's Northwest District in 2025.

== Description ==
The bakery/pâtisserie and restaurant Champagne Poetry Patisserie operates in Portland, Oregon. The original location is on Hawthorne Boulevard in southeast Portland's Sunnyside neighborhood and an outpost is on 23rd Avenue in the Slabtown district of Northwest Portland's Northwest District.

The Oregonian has described Champagne Poetry as an "Instagrammable favorite" with "decadent" and "lavish" desserts, "glam vibes", and "viral" soufflé pancakes. Portland Monthly has said of the original restaurant is "cheery pink through and through, from the pink exterior walls to the interior walls, every inch decorated with roses." The original location also has indoor and outdoor seating. The "big, colorful and maximalist" pink interior of the Slabtown restaurant has artificial plants, gold-colored plates and colorful flatware, and custom glassware.

=== Menu ===
Champagne Poetry has baked goods and pastries such as cakes, cream cheese bread, croissants, macarons, and tarts. Willamette Week has said the business offers "hyperrealistic" cakes, including one that "looks like a perfect Homer Simpson doughnut". Varieties of crêpe cake include rainbow and tiramisu. The Mango Tango mousse cake has chocolate raspberry mousse. The bakery has also used guava to ube as ingredients.

The Slabtown location has an Asian fusion (Asian and French) tasting menu and à la carte service. The menu includes peking duck, wagyu with sunchokes, and vegan squash with green vegetables and hazelnuts. The restaurant has also served oxtail soup with caramelized onions and manchego frico.

Drink options include champagnes and sparkling wines, as well as espresso drinks and wine. Among "elaborate" cocktails is one with grapefruit, orange, and passionfruit, served in a large glass swan; others have fragrant smoke or perfume. The Pink Dragon Breath has vodka, dragonfruit, and yuzu extract, as well as salt and tajín seasoning on the rim. Among non-alcoholic drinks is a dragon fruit cherry limeade served with crushed ice in a stemmed glass designed to resemble a flower. Chinese Gong Fu Cha tea service is also available via reservation.

== History ==
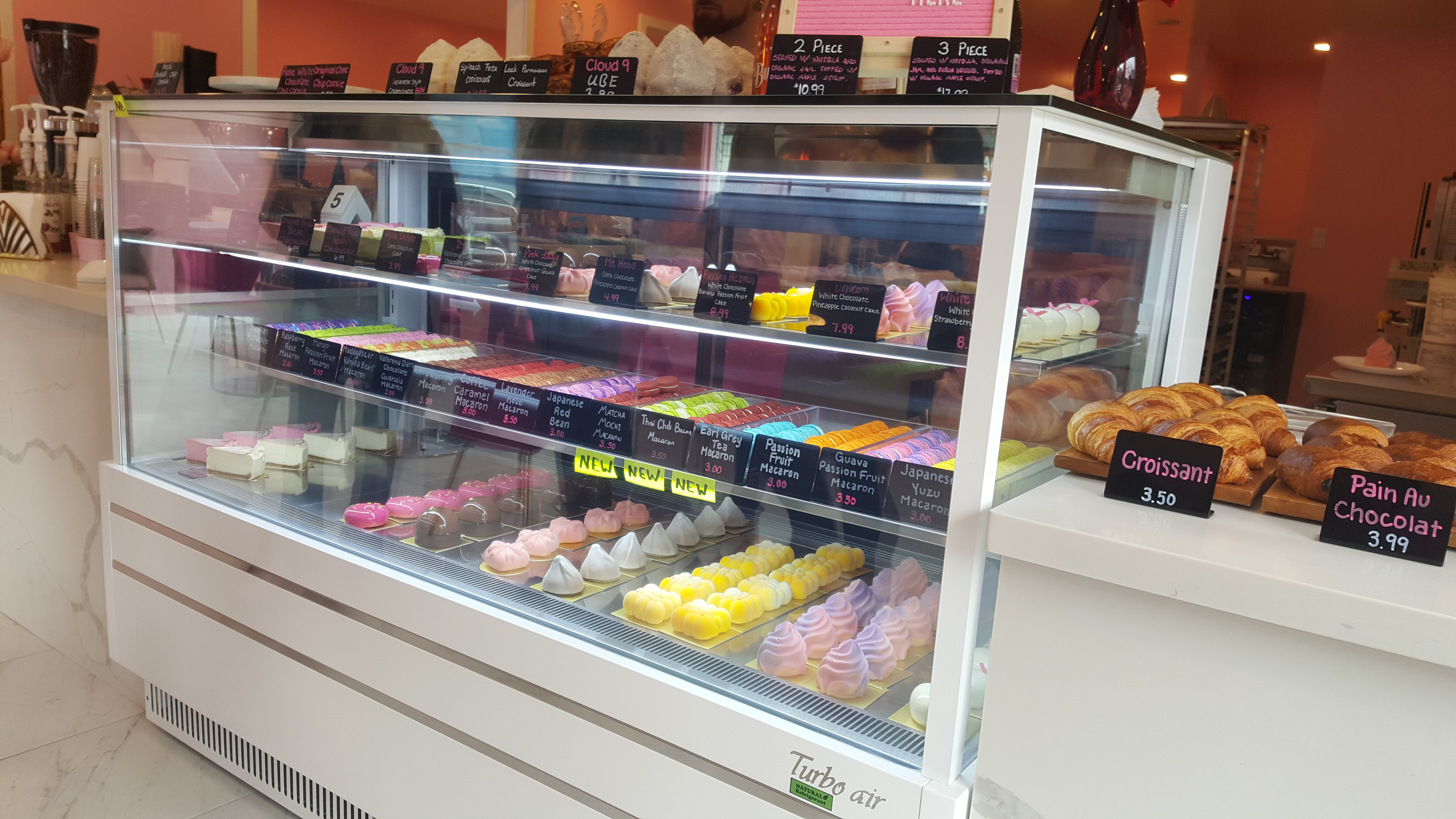
Display case in the southeast Portland location, 2022

The original restaurant soft opened on April 3, 2022, and the outpost opened in 2025. Dan Bian is the chef and owner.

A sommelier filed a defamation lawsuit against the business in 2025.

== Reception ==
The Oregonian said the Slabtown location "is a lot of fun – and, of course, it will look great in your social media posts". In PDX Parent magazine's 2022 list of the city's ten best new "treat shops", Renee Peters called the desserts "stunning" and recommended the soufflé pancakes.

== See also ==
- List of bakeries
