= Cedar Creek Fire =

2022 wildfire in the U.S. state of Oregon

- Part of the 2022 Oregon wildfires
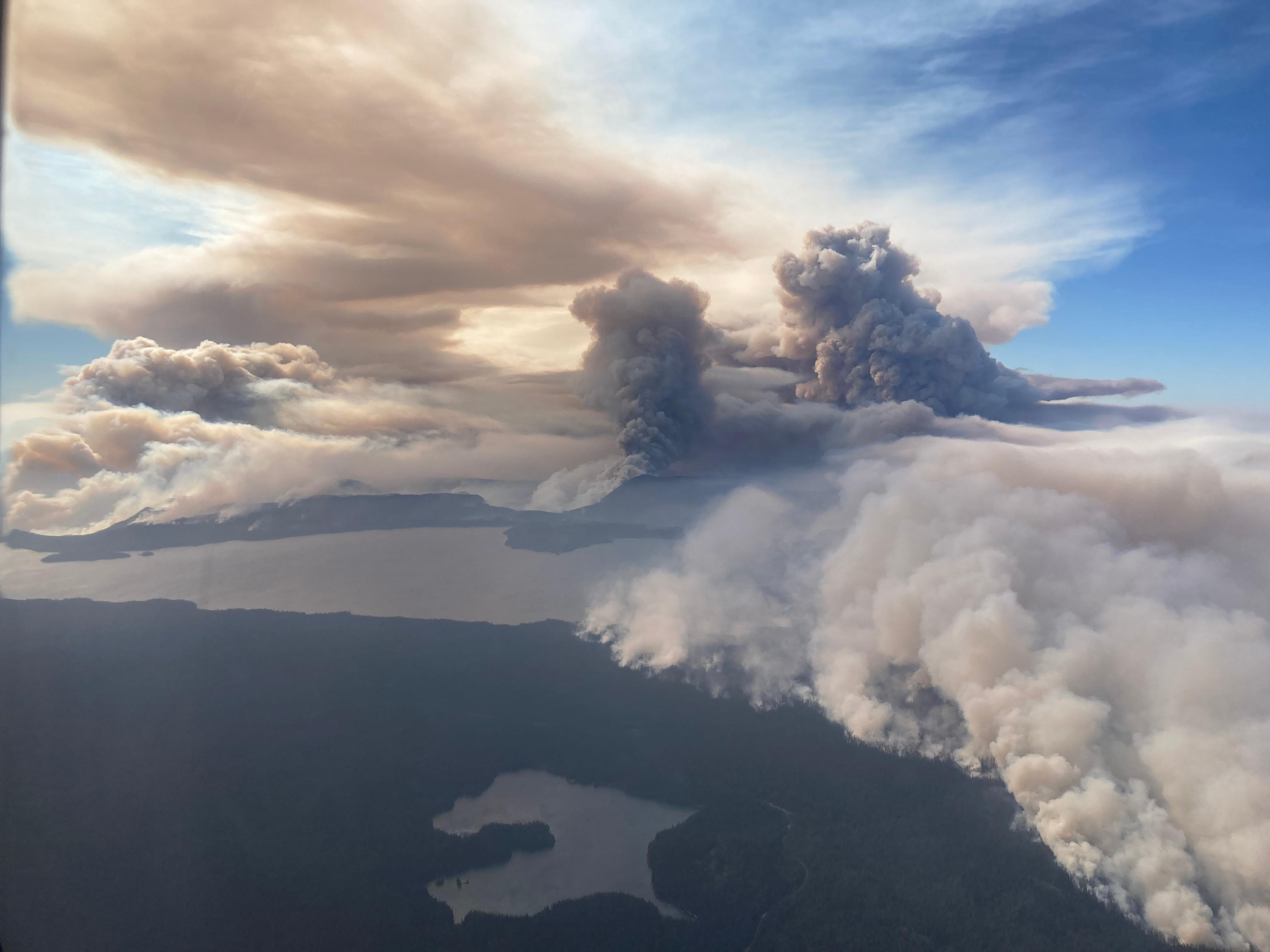
- Cedar Creek Fire on September 9, 2022
- Date: August 1, 2022 – November 22, 2022
- Location: Central Oregon
- Coordinates: 43.726°N 122.167°W

Statistics
- Burned area: 127,283 acres (51,510 ha)

Impacts
- Evacuated: Over 2,000
- Cost: $57.9 million USD (suppression cost only)

Ignition
- Cause: Lightning

Map
- Perimeter of Cedar Creek Fire

The Cedar Creek Fire was a large wildfire in the U.S. state of Oregon that began on August 1, 2022, with a series of lightning strikes in the Willamette National Forest approximately 15 miles (24 km) east of Oakridge.

By September 8, the fire had reached over 73,000 acres (30,000 ha). By September 10, it was over 74,000 acres; 30,000 foot high pyrocumulonimbus clouds from the fire were producing their own lightning; Oakridge was evacuated. Smoke from the fire moved into Southwest Washington then the Puget Sound region on September 10; on that day Seattle recorded the worst air quality of any major city in the world.

By September 11 it had grown to 86,000 acres. Over 2,000 homes were evacuated.

== Events ==
=== August ===
Late in the day on August 1, the fire was ignited by a lightning strike. It was first detected about 3.5 miles (5.6 km) west of Waldo Lake in the Willamette National Forest. Firefighters were slow to contain the fire, due to the rough and unsafe terrain surrounding the wildfire. The fire was estimated to be at around 5 acres on August 2, and was later estimated to be at 100 acres (40 ha) on early in the day on August 3, and a later estimate that day stated it was 500 acres (200 ha).

On August 3, the fire started moving more north and east and started burning in heavy timber and by August 4, it had grown to around 1,200 acres (490 ha), and smoke was predicted to affect the cities of Bend and Sisters, Oregon. An infrared reading on August 5 sized the fire at around 1,054 acres (427 ha).

On August 15, the fire grew to 4,422 acres with 0% containment. An area closure of all trailheads and dispersed camping North and West of Waldo Lake and Temporary Flight Restrictions were in effect.

On August 27, the fire grew to 7,632 acres with 0% containment. Area closures remained in effect North and West of Waldo Lake. Calm weather provided better opportunities for fire suppression. Firelines were continuing to be constructed using minimum impact suppressrion tactics (MIST) to reduce negative impacts on the ecosystem.

=== September ===
On September 25, the fire grew to 114,104 acres with 20% containment. 44 engines, 28 crews, 68 heavy equipment, and 9 helicopters were staffed for fire suppression.

=== October ===
On October 27, the fire grew to 127,283 acres with 60% containment. Due to temperatures dropping and humidity rising, fire progression reduced drastically. 4 engines, 2 crews, 1 helicopter, and 2 masticators were staffed for fire suppression. Closures had reduced on the Deschutes National Forest and Willamette National Forest. Air quality ranged from good to moderate within the forecasted area. Lane County evacuations had been lifted.

== Impacts ==
Smoke from the Cedar Creek Fire that blew into Seattle, 250 miles (400 km) to the north, caused the city to record the worst air quality of any major city in the world. Smoke also blew into the Eugene area.

== Fire progression and containment ==
Fire containment status Gray: contained; Red: active; %: percent contained;
Date	Area burned in acres	Containment
Aug 2	5	
Aug 3	500	
Aug 4	1,200	
Aug 5	1,054	
Aug 6	1,438	
Aug 7	1,822	
Aug 8	3,234	
Aug 9	3,536	
Aug 10	3,772	
Aug 11	3,861	
Aug 12	3,948	
Aug 13	4,136	
Aug 14	4,256	
Aug 15	4,422	
Aug 16	4,657	
Aug 17	4,836	
Aug 18	4,836	
Aug 19	5,618	
Aug 20	6,528	
Aug 21	6,472	
Aug 22	7,012	
Aug 23	7,172	
Aug 24	7,264	
Aug 25	7,376	
Aug 26	7,602	
Aug 27	7,632	
Aug 28	7,654	
Aug 29	7,698	
Aug 30	7,821	
Aug 31	8,421	
Sep 1	8,817	
Sep 2	9,199	
Sep 3	16,303	
Sep 4	16,715	
Sep 5	17,625	
Sep 6	18,143	
Sep 7	18,143	
Sep 8	31,486	
Sep 9	33,099	
Sep 10	51,814	
Sep 11	85,926	
Sep 12	86,734	
Sep 13	92,548	
Sep 14	92,595	
Sep 15	92,596	
Sep 16	93,427	
Sep 17	110,361	
Sep 18	112,287	
Sep 19	113,322	
Sep 20	113,637	
Sep 21	113,637	
Sep 22	113,637	
