= Shanghai Tunnel Bar =

Bar in Portland, Oregon, U.S.

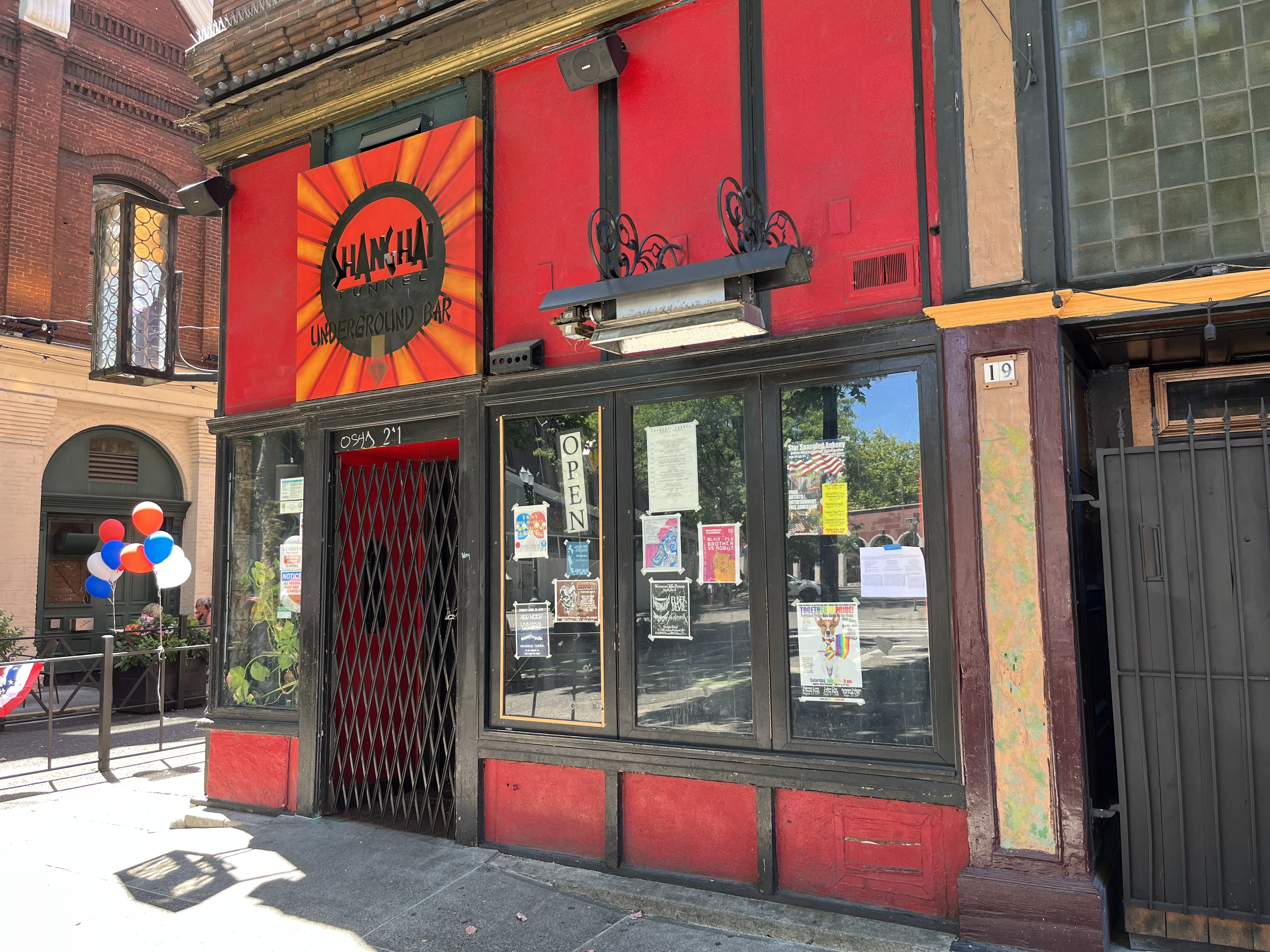
- The bar's exterior in 2023
- Interactive map of Shanghai Tunnel Bar

Restaurant information
- Owner: Phil Ragaway
- Food type: Asian
- Location: 211 Southwest Ankeny Street, Portland, Multnomah, Oregon, 97204, United States
- Coordinates: 45.5226°N 122.6725°W
- Website: shanghaitunnelbar.com

Shanghai Tunnel Bar, or simply Shanghai Tunnel, is a dive bar and Asian restaurant in the Old Town Chinatown neighborhood of Portland, Oregon. Named after the city's Shanghai tunnels, the underground bar serves Asian-themed cocktails and foods such as BLTs, Chinese chicken salad, miso and noodle soup, quesadillas, and veggie burgers. Owned by Phil Ragaway, Shanghai Tunnel is known for its inexpensive drinks and pinball machines. The bar closed temporarily during the COVID-19 pandemic, and later offered street-level service.

== Description ==
Named after Portland's Shanghai tunnels and located near Burnside Street in Old Town Chinatown, Shanghai Tunnel Bar has been described by Willamette Week's Suzette Smith as a "gruff but lovable" and "dank, brick-lined basement" dive bar with pinball and "friendship" (side-by-side) toilets in the women's restroom. The Oregonian's Grant Butler said the subterranean bar has an "almost dungeon-like feel, with glowing lanterns meant to evoke the early Portland era when underground tunnels were home to all sorts of criminal enterprise".

The business serves Asian-themed cocktails such as the Crouching Tiger, named after the film Crouching Tiger, Hidden Dragon (2000). According to a Rough Guide published in 2004, the bar is popular with hipsters and serves Asian-style soul food. Food options in 1998 included BLTs, Chinese chicken salad, miso and noodle soup, quesadillas, and veggie burgers; the drink menu included beer, wine, and bourbon and Scotch whisky. In a 2015 overview of Portland's underground bars, Jon Shadel of the Portland Mercury described Shanghai Tunnel as a "bro-ish" dive and wrote:

At ground level, the bar may appear dead and a bit sketchy, but wander downstairs and you'll discover a dungeon-like liquor haven lit with paper lanterns. The bar has become a weekend institution on downtown's frat-party circuit ... Half a dozen pinball machines line a wall, and flannel-clad guys wearing Blazers caps chat up girls in miniskirts sitting around tables sticky with spilt PBR.

For the newspaper's similar overview the following year, Thomas Ross wrote, "One full floor underground, the only hint of daylight is the blazing digital sun in HD on the Buck Hunter screen." In 2021, a Willamette Week article said: "It's possible that Shanghai is the last chill bar in Old Town where you can hole up—waiting out the weekend warriors—to play a little pool, pinball or Big Buck Hunter Pro."

== History ==
Shanghai Tunnel is owned by Phil Ragaway. In 2004, the bar was hosting Rock Bingo on the last Sunday of each month. Shanghai Tunnel was the starting point for villains participating in Power Struggle, a "heroes-vs.-villains" pub crawl hosted by the Alter Egos Society as part of Stumptown Comics Fest and Portland's Comics Month, in 2010. In 2017, the bar had at least five pinball machines. It closed temporarily during the COVID-19 pandemic, reopening in May 2021. According to Willamette Week, "As it reopened this summer, Shanghai's focus shifted from its basement to the small street-level bar and patio—located next to the breezeway of the front door."

== Reception ==
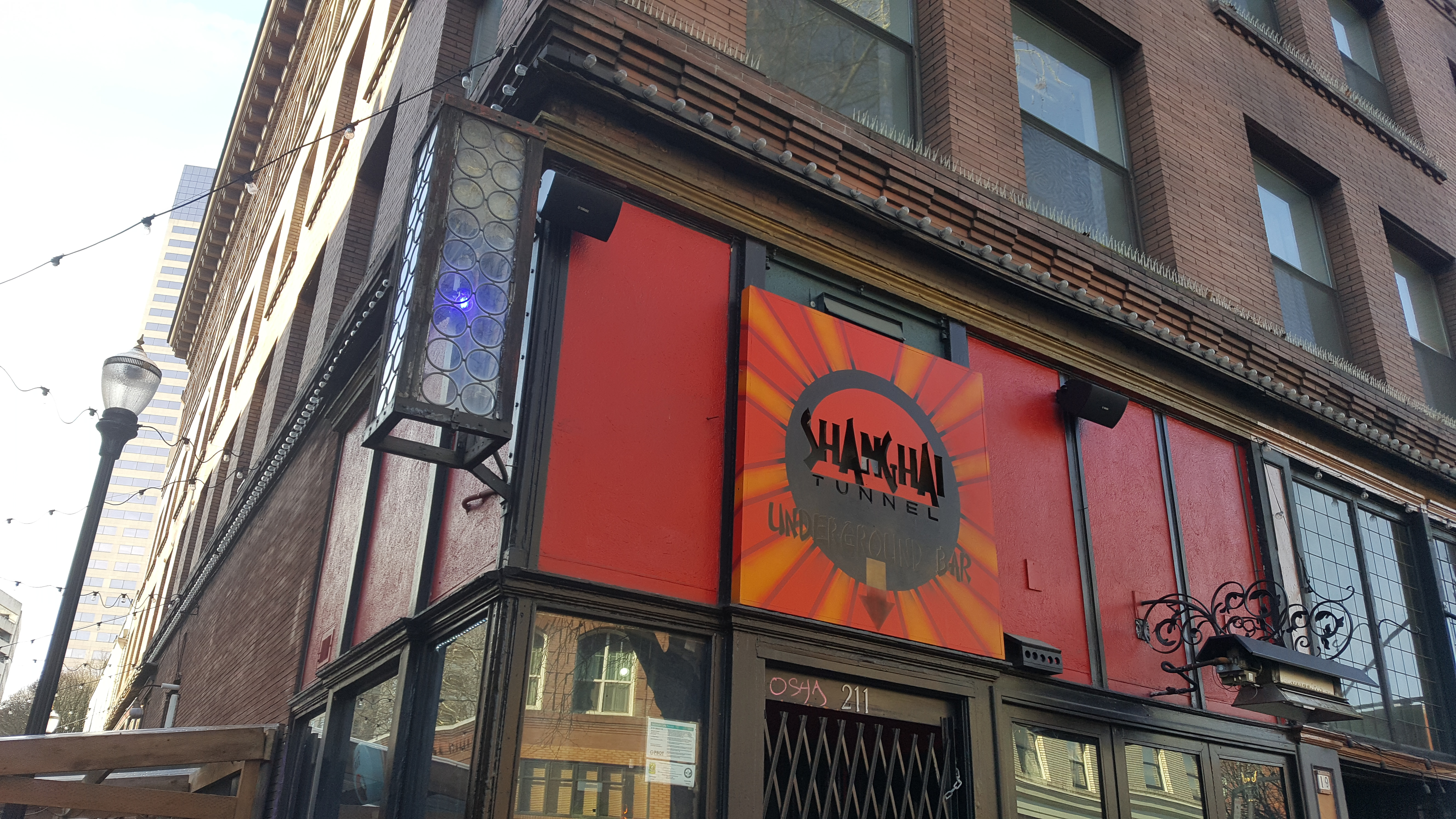
The bar's sign in 2022

In her Portland Happy Hour Guidebook (2008), Cindy Anderson said that the bar had the "best pot stickers [Chinese dumplings] ever". In Thrillist's 2014 guide to Old Town Chinatown, Katherine Vetrano recommended Shanghai Tunnel "for end of the week annihilation" and wrote: "You've had the week (or day) from hell, and your plan is to hole up in the dark and drink the memory of it away: Shanghai is your spot. Drinks are strong and cheap ($2 wells during happy hour), and you'll want to order their Zapata for eating — it's house-made chips with both chew and crunch, dipped in hot queso." In 2015, the Portland Mercury's Jon Shadel recommended visiting in mid-week (to avoid crowds) and wrote: "An Asian-themed food menu offers a nice respite from the typical burgers-and-truffle-fries fare found in other nearby establishments—the panko-crusted tofu with noodles in peanut sauce satisfies drunk hunger quite nicely." In her 2016 Moon guide book of Portland, Hollyanna McCollom wrote:

The dark, seedy journey into the bowels of Old Town is part of the novelty, but it's also a pretty good bar. Skip straight to the narrow staircase to the basement, where the cocktails are stellar and pool is $0.50 a pop. Shanghai isn't classy, but that's okay because it never means to be.

Thrillist's Pete Cottell wrote in his 2019 overview of "what to do after dark" that Shanghai Tunnel "has plenty of pinball machines and cheap tallboys to kill an hour or two".

== See also ==
- List of dive bars
