= The Roxy (Portland, Oregon) =

Defunct diner in Portland, Oregon, U.S.

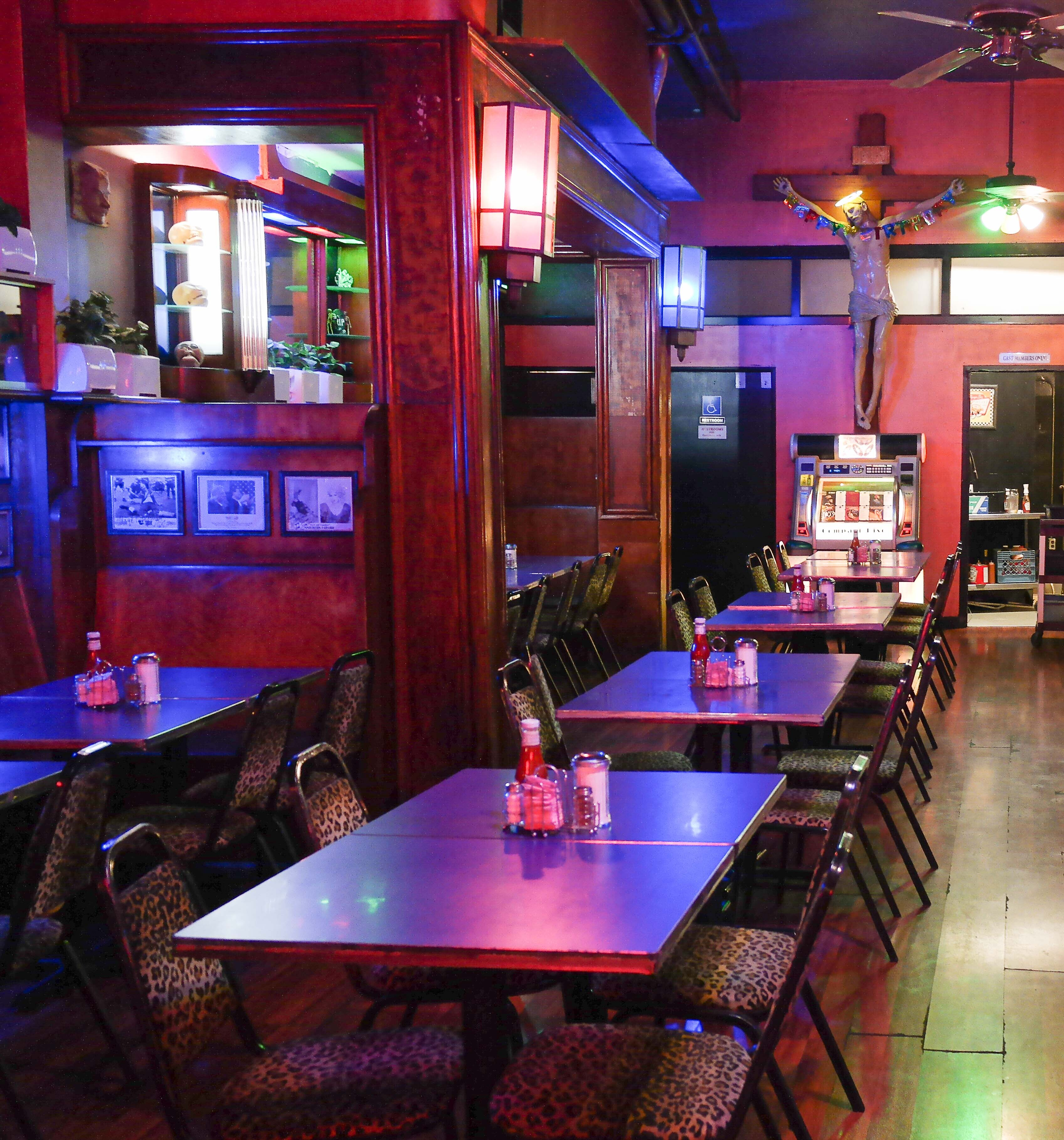
- The diner's interior in 2013
- Interactive map of The Roxy

Restaurant information
- Established: 1994 (32 years ago)
- Closed: March 20, 2022
- Owner: Suzanne Hale
- Food type: American
- Location: 1121 Southwest Harvey Milk Street, Portland, Multnomah, Oregon, 97205, United States
- Coordinates: 45.5225°N 122.6826°W
- Website: theroxydiner.com (archive copy)

The Roxy was a diner serving American cuisine in Portland, Oregon. Located on downtown Portland's Southwest Harvey Milk Street, the restaurant was established in 1994. The Roxy was popular as a late-night food destination and had a diverse clientele. Prior to the COVID-19 pandemic, the diner operated 24 hours a day, except on Mondays. The Roxy has been described as "iconic" and a "landmark", and was known for being an LGBTQ-friendly establishment because of its employees' community involvement and its location within the historic hub of LGBTQ culture and nightlife. Following a forced six-month closure due to the pandemic, the diner opened under new public health and safety guidelines in November 2020. The diner closed in March 2022.

== Description ==
The Roxy was a diner on Southwest Harvey Milk Street in downtown Portland. The restaurant's small storefront neighbors were the gay bar Scandals and a residential hotel. The Roxy served American cuisine, including breakfast all day, and was described as having a "funky avant-garde theme". The interior featured a jukebox and a sculpture of Jesus. Depictions of nude women appeared on an overhead mirror. Prior to the COVID-19 pandemic, the diner was open 24 hours a day, except on Mondays. Scandals patrons could order food from The Roxy and consume from inside the bar.

Jason Kaplan of Oregon Business described the diner's clientele as "a diverse bunch" and wrote: "There is usually a surge in business after 2 a.m. when the bars close. The Roxy is a popular spot after a night of clubbing." In 2020, Thom Hilton of Portland Monthly described The Roxy as a "gay diner", a "neon dive", and an "all-ages queer haven". Eater Portland's Brooke Jackson-Glidden has called the restaurant a "quintessential Portland hangout—especially among teenagers, partiers, and night-shifters".

== History ==
The Roxy was established in 1994. Suzanne Hale (nicknamed "The Lovely Suzanne") owned the restaurant since c. 1995. In 2013, Eater Portland published Hale's "dish on what 24 hours is like at the open-all-day diner", giving readers an overview of typical shifts and The Roxy's clientele. The diner had a few longtime employees. April Shattuck served as general manager since The Roxy opened. As of 2018, one waiter had served patrons for 23 years, including 18 on the night shift. Hale's daughter April also served as a waitress at The Roxy.

=== Connection to the LGBTQ community ===
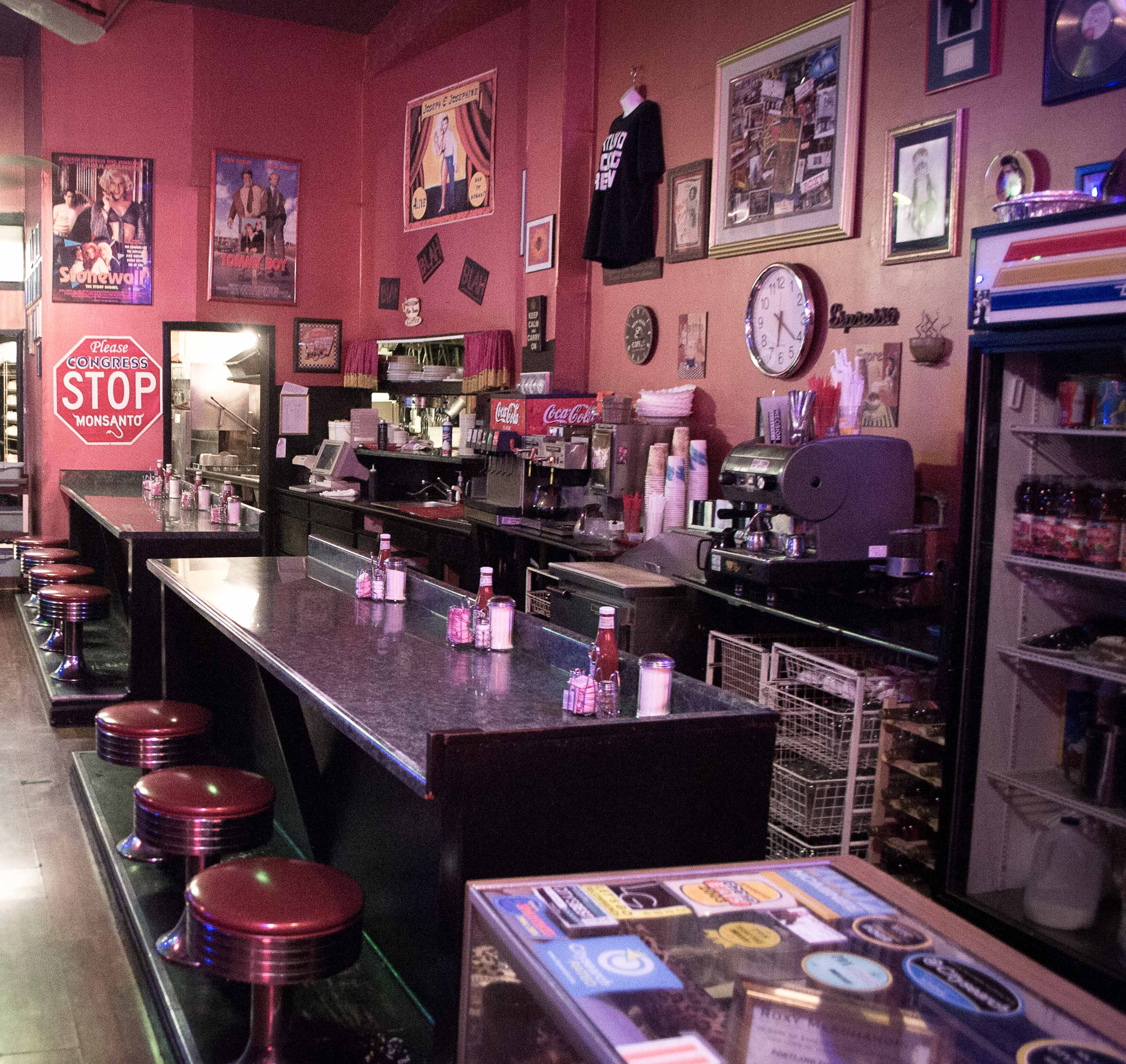
The Roxy's lunch counter in 2013

Hale and The Roxy had a history of supporting Portland's LGBTQ community. She participated in an annual drag pageant presented by the International Sovereign Rose Court, Oregon's oldest LGBTQ nonprofit organization, and spoke at local gay–straight alliance meetings. She and other employees of the restaurant collected signatures for the Harvey Milk Street Project, an effort to name a part of Stark Street after LGBTQ rights activist and politician Harvey Milk. Hale said Stark Street's namesake, Benjamin Stark, "did not represent the city well".

In 2018, the stretch of Stark Street in front of The Roxy was successfully renamed Southwest Harvey Milk Street. As a sign of gratitude for the diner employees' contributions, the Harvey Milk Foundation presented The Roxy with a portrait painting of Milk. On behalf of the foundation, activist and politician Nicole Murray-Ramirez called the artwork "a way to honor the community and Portland residents who gathered signatures and helped make the city the third in the country to have a street named for Milk". In 2018, The Oregonian's Andrew Theen described Scandals and The Roxy as "the most-prominent gay businesses" still operating in the historical hub of local LGBTQ culture and nightlife.

=== COVID-19 pandemic and closure ===
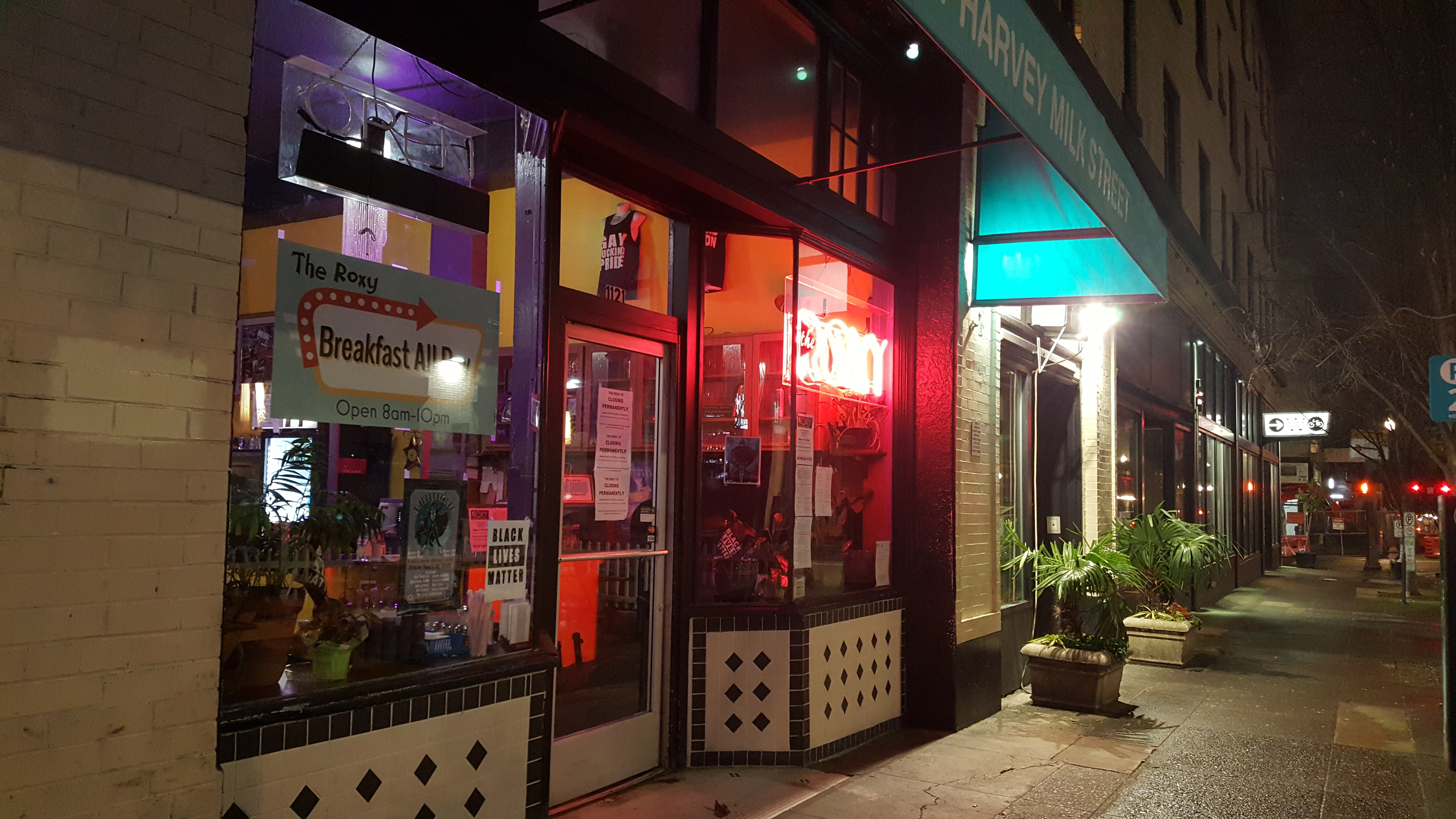
The diner's exterior in March 2022, days before closing

The Roxy was forced to close for approximately six months in 2020 because of the COVID-19 pandemic. Plywood covered the diner's windows, and a sign was displayed, saying, "The Roxy is closed until this is over ... take care of yourselves, stay home, and Washie Washie!" Following a remodel, The Roxy reopened on November 8, operating under new public health and safety guidelines. Two parking spaces outside the restaurant were converted to outdoor seating areas per a "healthy business permit" issued by the Portland Bureau of Transportation (PBOT). Five structures resembling greenhouses built by nearby Cheryl's on 12th nearly doubled The Roxy's temporary capacity.

The remodel saw improvements to the diner's bathrooms and kitchens as well as the installation of plexiglass to reduce the spread of COVID-19. Additionally, porcelain tile and stainless steel replaced some interior finished wood features for easier cleaning. The Roxy closed at 10:00 p.m. daily as of November 2020; COVID-19 precautions included socially distanced tables, temperature checks for patrons and staff, and regular disinfecting.

The diner closed permanently on March 20, 2022. The Roxy's owners attributed the closure to financial losses during the pandemic. In February 2021, during planned reopening efforts, a fire and resulting water damage forced another four-month closure. When the city later announced it would rehabilitate the building the Roxy was operating in, Hale said the Roxy was forced out, prompting the permanent closure.

== Reception ==
The Roxy has been described as "iconic" and a "landmark". Willamette Week said in a 2015 bar guide:

Whither the Roxy, so goes a whole culture of the teenaged, the goth, the gender-idiosyncratic, the deeply drunk and Ecstasy-enamored and otherwise merely nearby—Portland's joyful late-night fringe that seemingly, mostly, needs an insane amount of egg, biscuit, bacon and especially gravy; a bottomless 4 a.m. cup of joe; and a 5 a.m. heart attack. This ode to camp and days gone by, in the 'heart of a glamour district' that has mostly faded around it, does not change and does not fade. It never should.

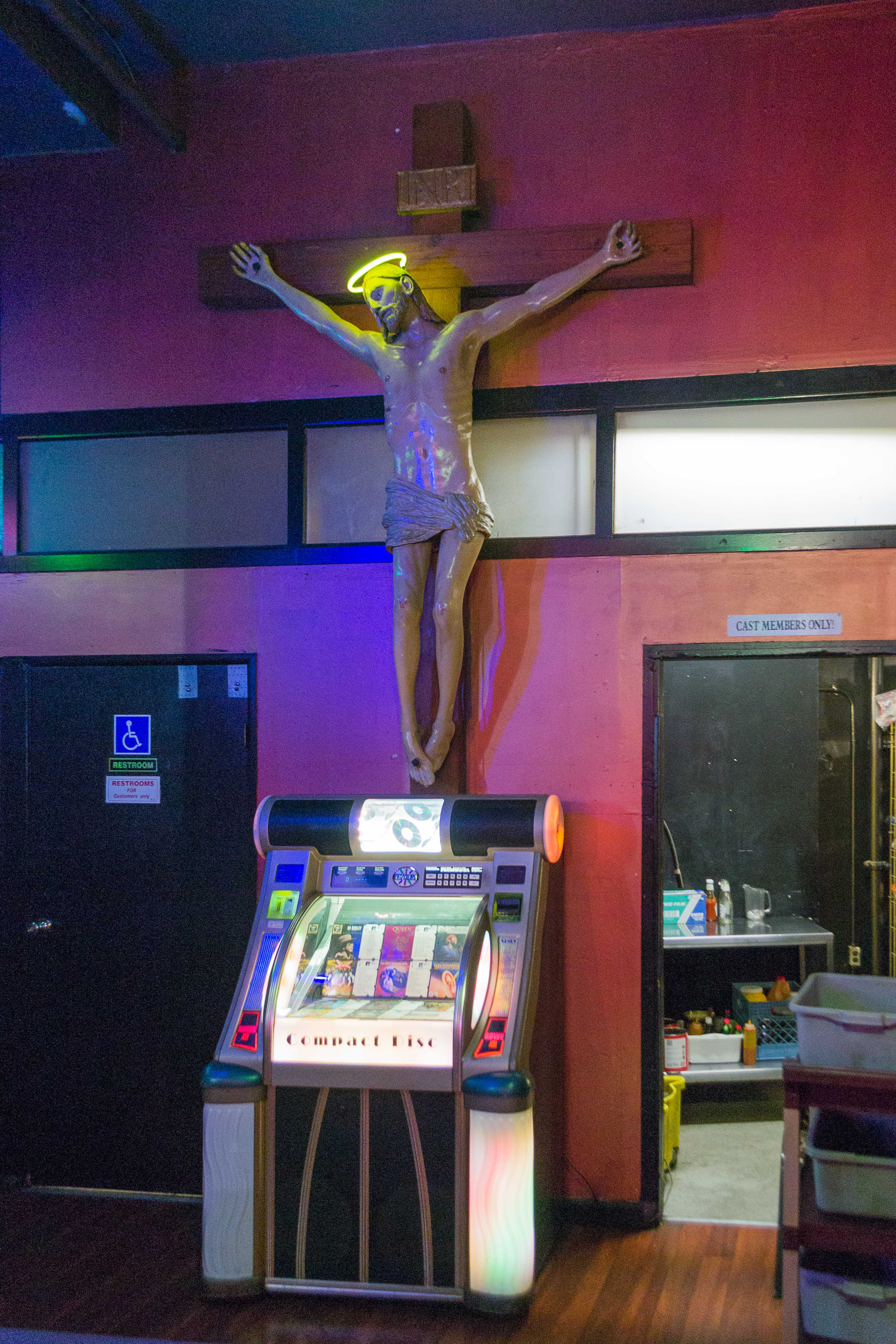
The Roxy's jukebox and sculpture of Jesus, 2013

A 2017 article in the newspaper stated: "The Roxy is the only thing in Portland seemingly immune to the ravages of time, with DayGlo-yellow gravy, omelets thick as thighs and tables full of teens conceived on Molly who also take Molly. Long may it ruin the digestion of the drunk and high." The Portland Mercury's Santi Elijah Holley wrote:

If you're looking for a taste of Old Portland, no matter what time of night or day ... look no further than the Roxy. For more than two decades, this 24-hour diner has been a destination for late-night carousers in need of a 4 a.m. fix, or a before-work hangover meal. Breakfast at the Roxy, like any good diner worth its salt, is served anytime, in large portions, and naturally, named after second-rate actors or classic B-movies.... Mind you, this isn't food meant to be savored, shared, or Instagrammed; it is meant to sop up booze—and in that, the Roxy triumphs.

In his 2018 overview of "the best in LGBTQ+ nightlife, bars, parties, comedy, and more", the newspaper's Andrew Jankowski described The Roxy as an "after-party drunk food oasis". Jason Kaplan of Oregon Business wrote in 2018: "[S]ince Portland's halcyon days of the 1990s when things were still weird, The Roxy has been a late-night oasis for revelers of all stripes. After the bars kick you out you can come here and drink coffee until you're sober, or fight a hangover with pancakes." In his 2019 "ultimate guide to Portland's 40 best brunches", The Oregonian's Michael Russell called The Roxy an "old-school Portland diner with an all-day breakfast menu and 24-hour service" and a "dim downtown haunt". The newspaper's Lizzy Acker ranked The Roxy number 20 on her 2019 list of the city's top 25 corned beef hash entrées. She also said the 24-hour service and "vibe", reminding guests they ate in "Portland F---ing Oregon", were the "best things" about the diner. In 2020, Portland Monthly's Thom Hilton said: "The Roxy is the meeting place of kids who want to be weirdo grown-ups and weirdo grown-ups who might become ghosts.... This is a joint where you might pick up a cute bear's number as you chat about Twin Peaks and lighten up your coffee with milk from a baby bottle."

== See also ==
- Impact of the COVID-19 pandemic on the LGBTQ community
- List of diners
