= 2022 Oregon wildfires =

Natural disasters in the USA

2022 Oregon wildfries
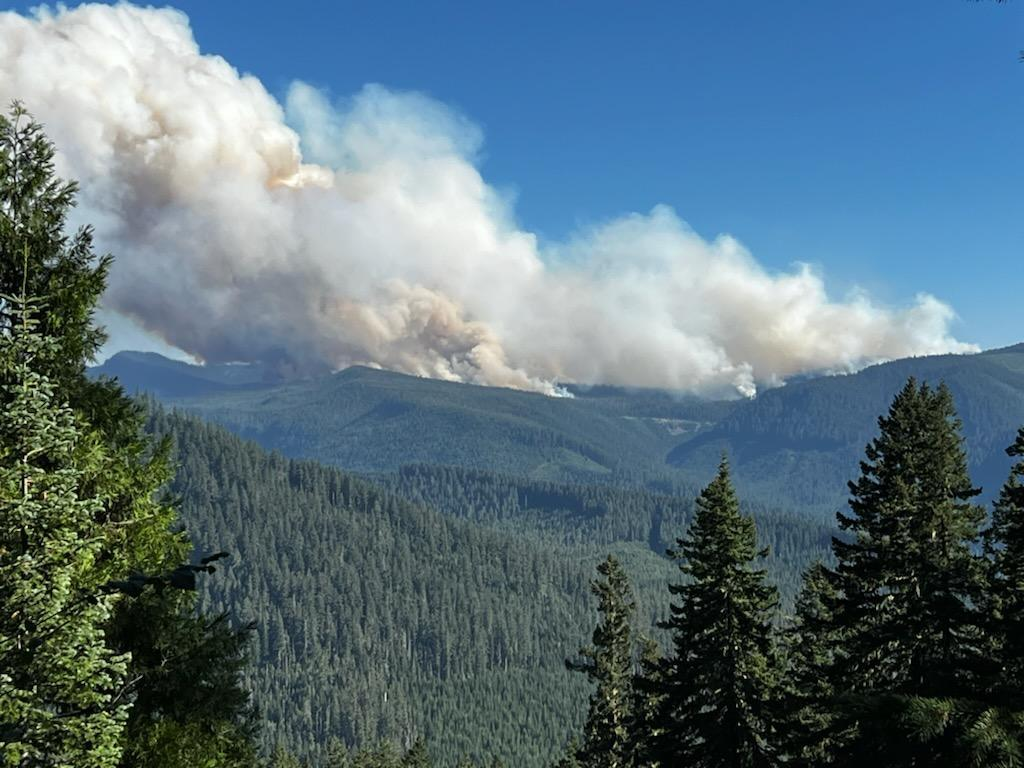
- Pyrocumulus cloud created by the Cedar Creek Fire in Oregon on August 4

Statistics
- Total fires: 1,975
- Burned area: 436,772

Impacts
- Deaths: 2
- Structures lost: 2

The 2022 Oregon wildfire season was a series of wildfires burning in the U.S. state of Oregon.

On August 28, 2022, Governor Kate Brown declared a statewide emergency because multiple wildfires, including the Rum Creek Fire. That same month, Governor Brown invoked the Emergency Conflagration Act because of the Miller Road/Dodge Fire. On October 22nd, the Oregon Department of Forestry declared an end to fire season due in part to rainy, cooler conditions. As of the announced end of the 2022 fire season, 1,975 fires had burned 436,772 acres across the state.

== Background ==
"Fire season" in Oregon typically begins in mid-May and ends with the first rains that normally begins in late September. Drought, snowpack levels, and local weather conditions play a role in Oregon's fire season, particularly in Eastern and Southwest Oregon. During peak fire season from July to September, most wildfires are caused by lightning, while ignitions in the early and later parts of the season are related to humans. Warm, dry conditions in summer heighten the wildfire risk. After over 100 years of fire suppression and prevention of all fires, there is now an abundance of fuel. Climate change is leading to a reduced snowpack with an earlier and reduced snowmelt, so there is a higher risk for areas that receive wildfires.

== List of wildfires ==
The following is a list of fires that burned more than 1,000 acres (400 ha), or produced significant structural damage or casualties.

Name	County	Acres	Start date	Containment date (Note: Containment means that fire crews have established and secured control lines around the fire's perimeter. These lines are artificial barriers, like trenches or cleared vegetation, designed to stop the fire's spread, or natural barriers like rivers. Containment reflects progress in managing the fire but does not necessarily mean the fire is starved of fuel, under control, or put out.)	Notes	Ref
Griffin	Harney	1,705	July 15	August 11	Unknown cause	
Windigo	Deschutes	1,007	July 30	September 5	Caused by lightning strike	
Cedar Creek	Deschutes, Lane	112,287	August 1	November 22	Caused by lightning strike; caused the evacuation on the city of Oakridge	
Big Swamp	Douglas	111	August 1	September 4	Caused by lightning strike; 1 firefighter died after being struck by a tree	
Miller Road	Wasco	10,847	August 2	August 25	Unknown cause. Destroyed 1 structure	
Rum Creek	Josephine	21,347	August 17	October 17	Caused by lightning strike; 1 firefighter died after being struck by a tree	
Crockets Knob	Grant	4,287	August 22	November 22	Caused by lightning strike	
Sturgill	Union, Wallowa	23,507	August 22	October 26	Caused by lightning strike	
Nebo	Wallowa	12,609	August 25	October 26	Caused by lightning strike	
Double Creek	Wallowa	171,532	August 30	October 26	Caused by lightning strike	
Van Meter	Klamath	3,500	September 7	September 8	Unknown cause, burning near Merrill	
Amelia Road	Malheur	3,727	September 8	September 10	Unknown cause	
